= Frits Thaulow =

Norwegian Impressionist painter (1847–1906)

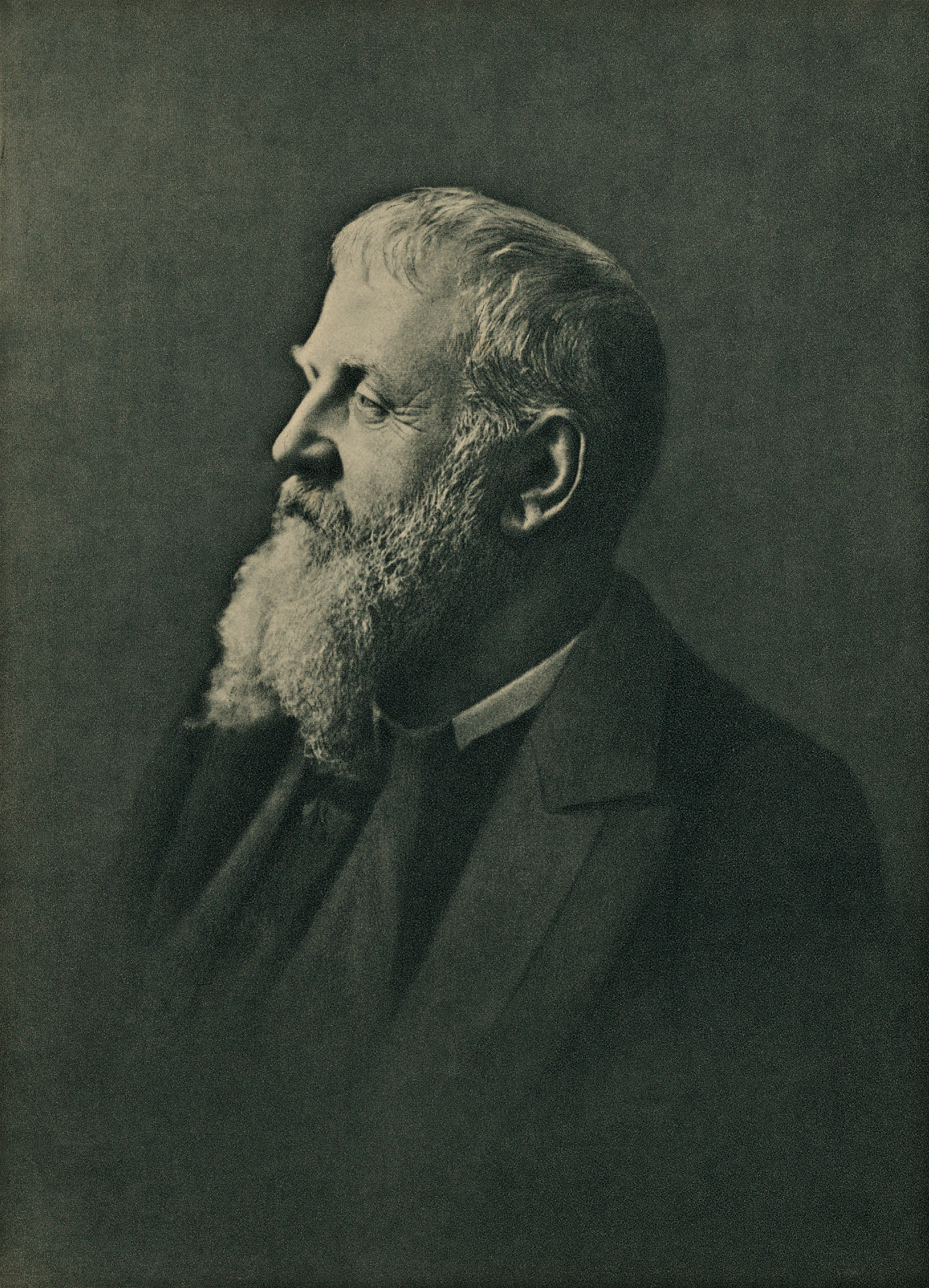
- Born: 20 October 1847; Christiania, Norway
- Died: 5 November 1906 (aged 59); Volendam, Netherlands
- Known for: Landscape painting
- Movement: Impressionism
- Spouse(s): Ingeborg Charlotte Gad (m. 1874; div. 1886) Alexandra Lasson (m. 1886)
- Children: 4, including Else Frölich
- Father: Harald Thaulow
- Awards: Order of Saint Olav (Commander); Order of Saints Maurice and Lazarus; Legion of Honour (Officer); Nichan Iftikhar

Frits Thaulow (20 October 1847 – 5 November 1906) was a Norwegian Impressionist painter renowned for his naturalistic depictions of landscape.

== Early life and education ==
Johan Frederik Thaulow was born in Christiania, the son of a wealthy chemist, Harald Conrad Thaulow (1815–1881), and Nicoline ("Nina") Louise Munch (1821–1894). Thaulow was educated at the Academy of Art in Copenhagen in 1870–1872, and from 1873 until 1875 he studied with Hans Gude at the Baden School of Art in Karlsruhe.

== Career ==
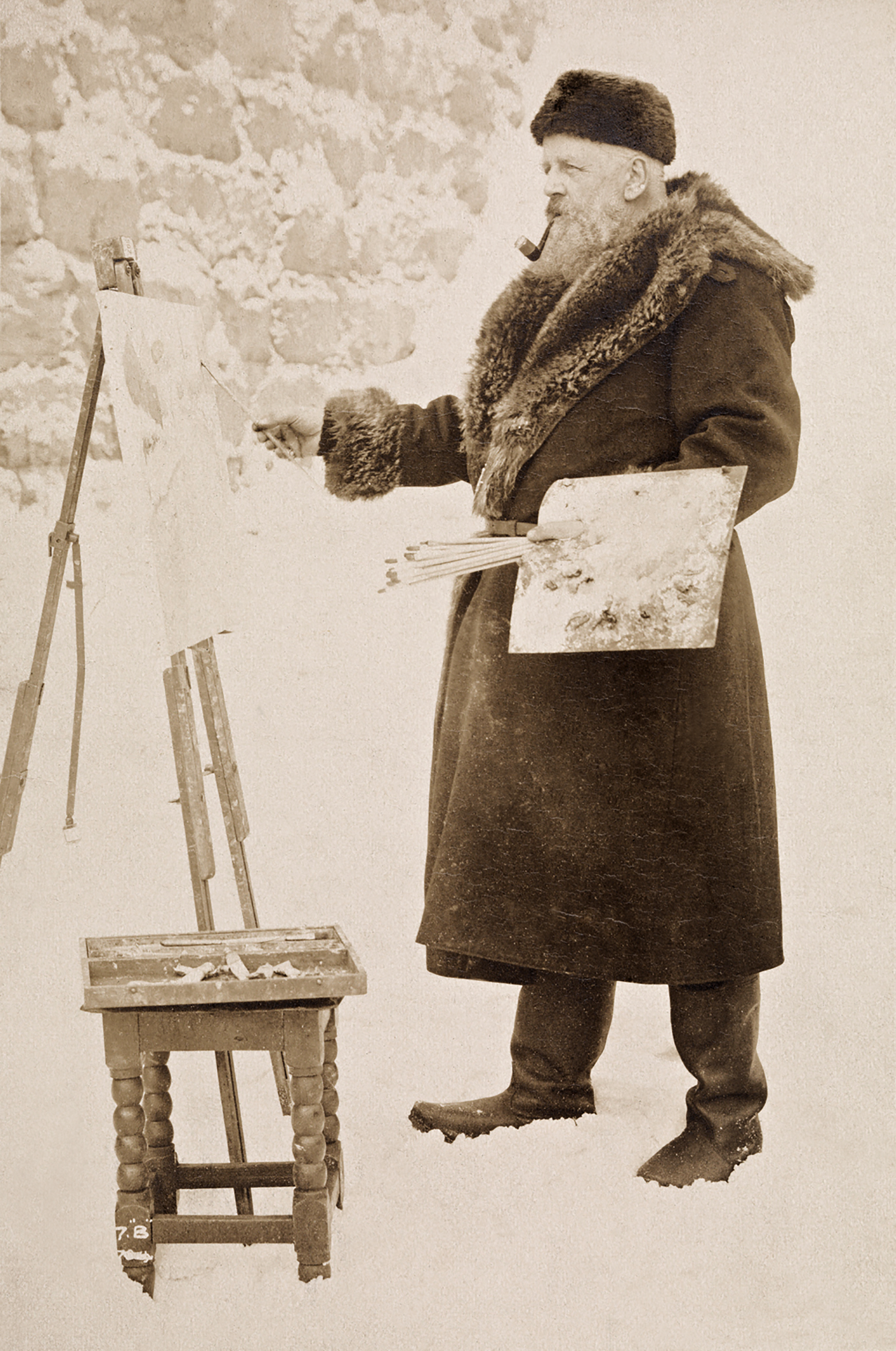
Frits Thaulow, ca 1900. Photograph by Anders Beer Wilse

Thaulow was one of the earliest artists to paint in Skagen in the north of Jutland, soon to become famous for its Skagen Painters. He arrived there in 1879 with his friend Christian Krohg, who persuaded him to spend the summer and autumn there. They arrived from Norway in Thaulow's little boat. Thaulow, who had specialized in marine painting, turned to Skagen's favorite subjects, the fishermen and the boats on the shore.

After his stay in Skagen, Thaulow returned to Norway in 1880. He became one of the leading young figures in the Norwegian art scene, together with Christian Krohg and Erik Werenskiold, and he helped establish the first National Art Exhibit (also known as Høstutstillingen or Autumn Exhibit) in 1882. Many of Thaulow's best-known Norwegian scenes are from Åsgårdstrand, which had become an important center for artists and painters dating from the 1880s.

Thaulow moved to France in 1892, living there until 1906. He soon discovered that the cityscapes of Paris did not suit him. His best paintings were made in small towns such as Montreuil-sur-Mer (1892–94), Dieppe and surrounding villages (1894–98), Quimperle in Brittany (1901) and Beaulieu-sur-Dordogne in the Corrèze département (1903). One of his most famous works made after he moved to France was A village street in France. In Dieppe Thaulow and his wife Alexandra made themselves popular: they were friends with artist Charles Conder, and they met Aubrey Beardsley.

Thaulow received a number of honors for his artistic activity, including his appointment as commander of the 2nd Royal Norwegian Order of St. Olav in 1905. He received the French Legion of Honor, the Order of Saints Maurice and Lazarus from Italy and the Order of Nichan Iftikhar from Tunisia. He died in Volendam, in The Netherlands. The National Gallery of Norway features 37 of his works. Other prominent displays include the Hermitage Museum in St. Petersburg, the Museum of Fine Arts in Boston and the Busch-Reisinger Museum at Harvard University.

== Personal life ==
Thaulow was married twice. In 1874 he married Ingeborg Charlotte Gad (1852–1908). They were the parents of silent film actress Else Frölich. The marriage dissolved in 1886. In 1886, he married Alexandra Lasson (1862–1955), the daughter of Carl Lasson (1830–1893), a noted Norwegian attorney. He had three children with his second wife: Harald Thaulow (1887–1971), Ingrid Thaulow (1892–1983) and Christian Lasson Thaulow (1895–1944).

== Selected gallery ==
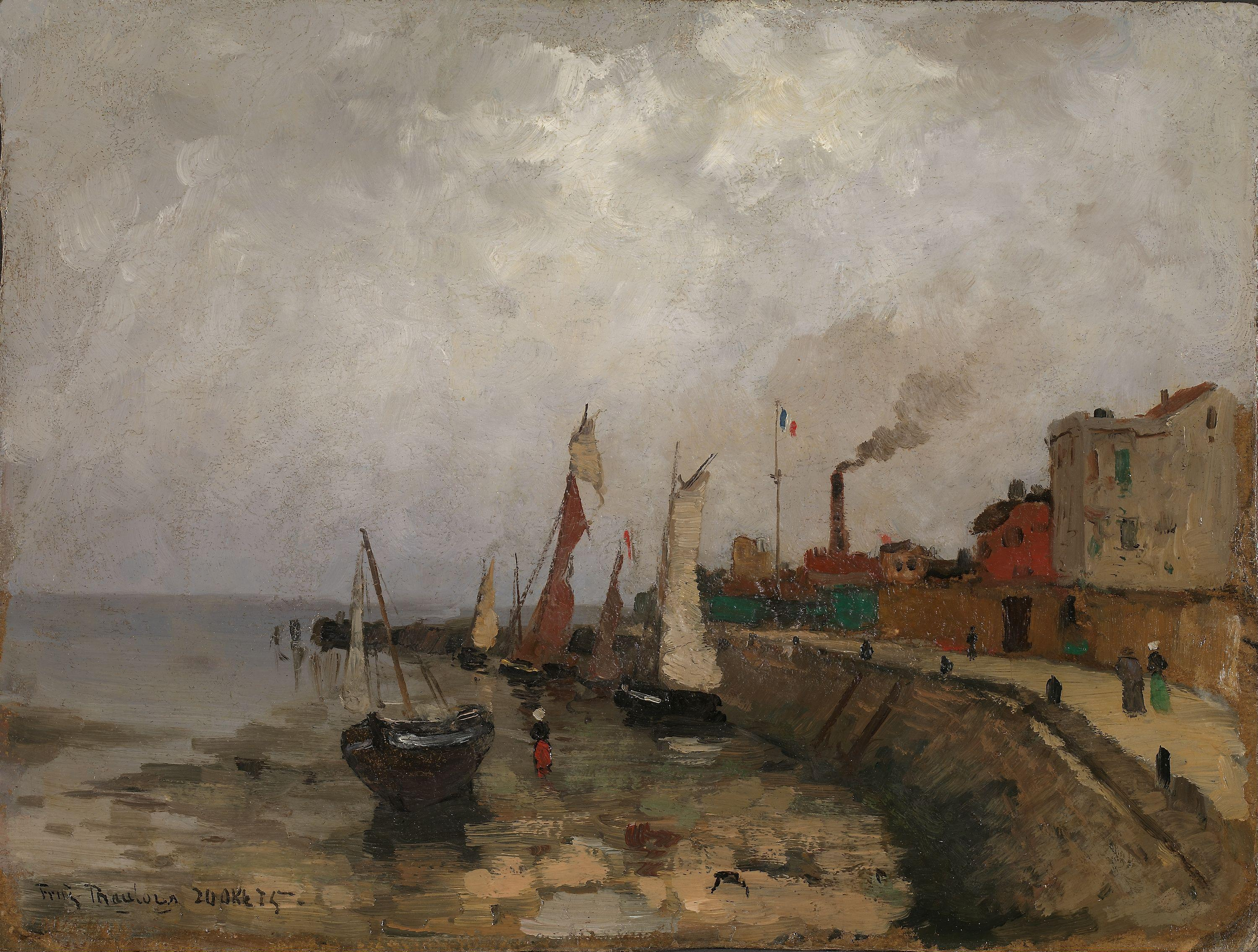
Fransk havn (Le Havre) 1875

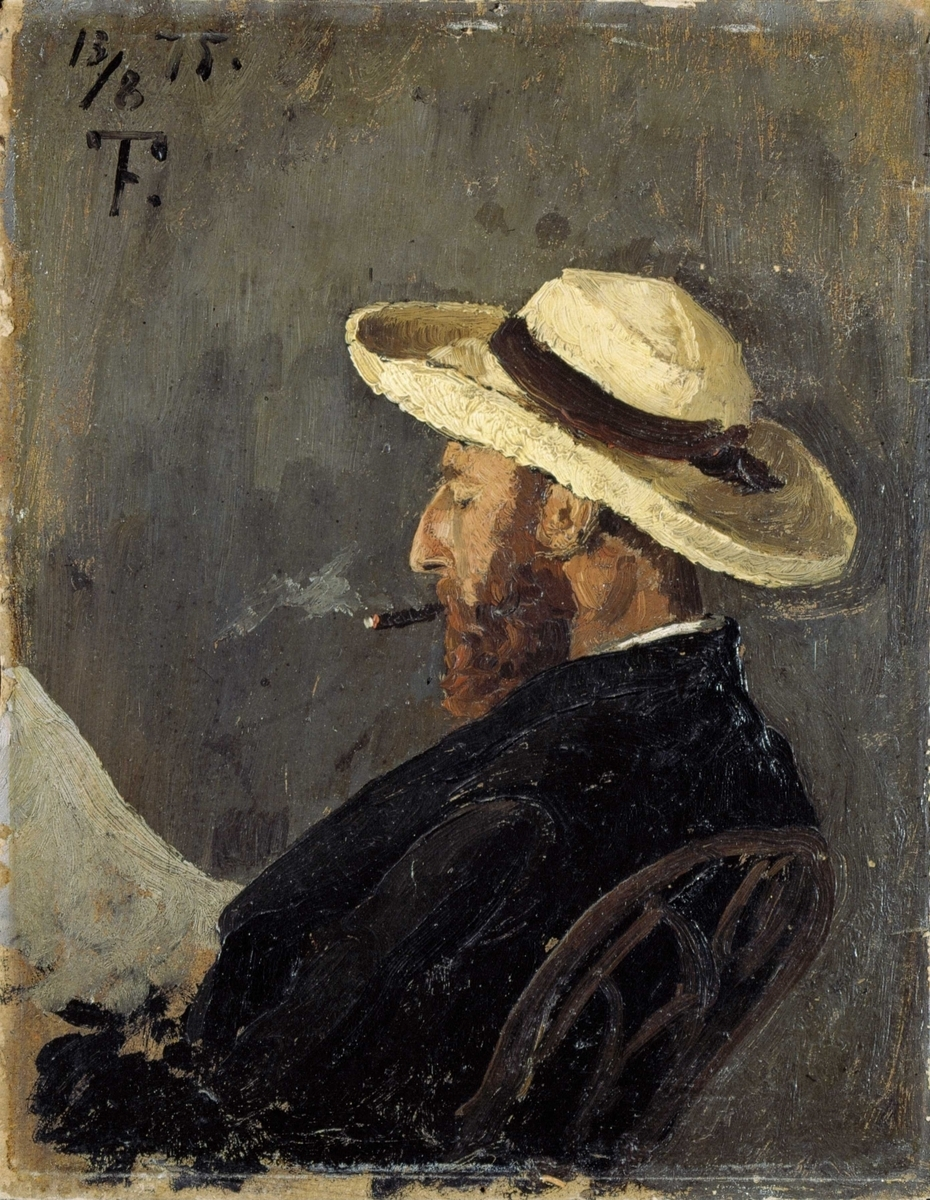
Portrait of Frederik Collett 1875

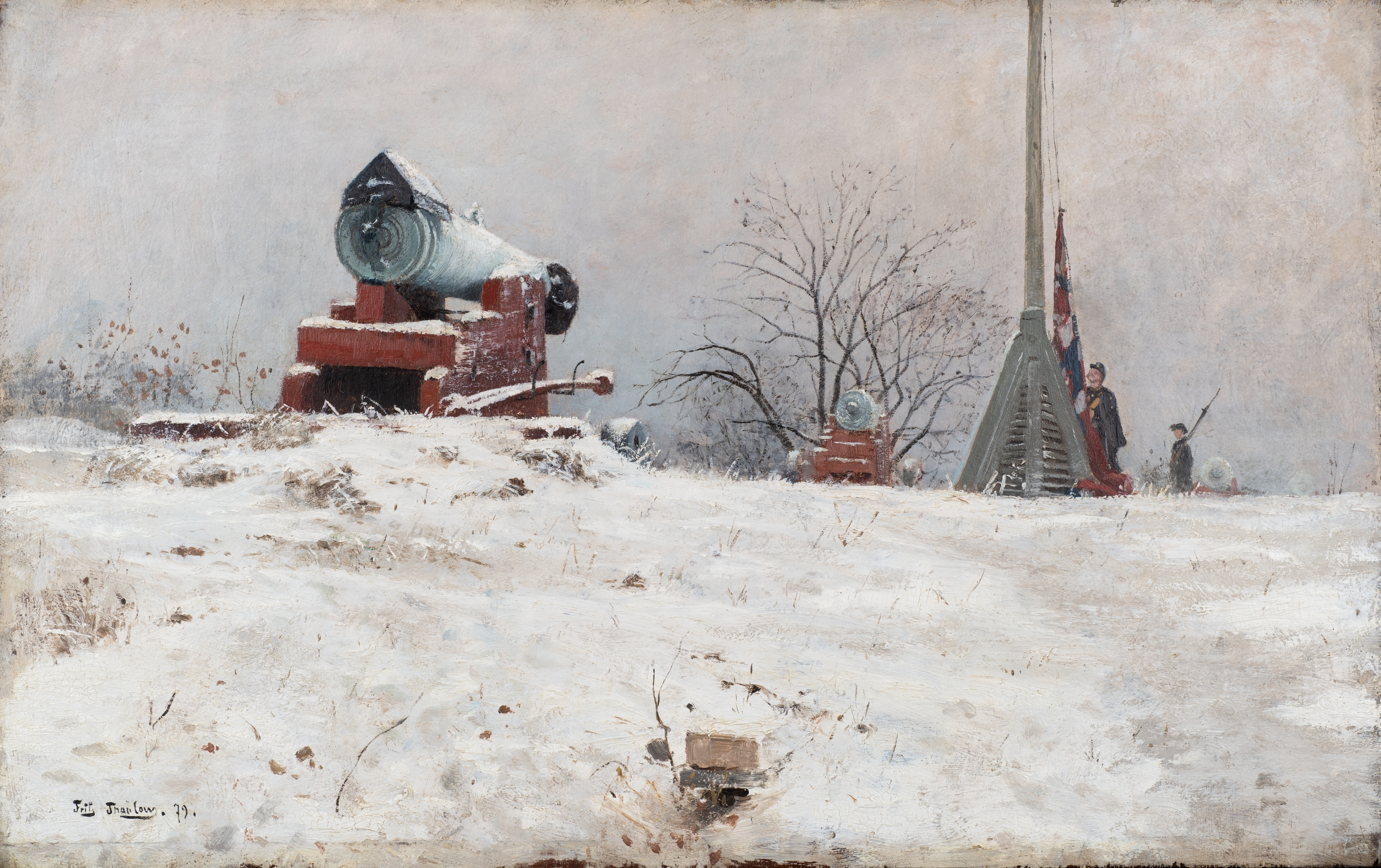
The King, from Akershus fortress 1878

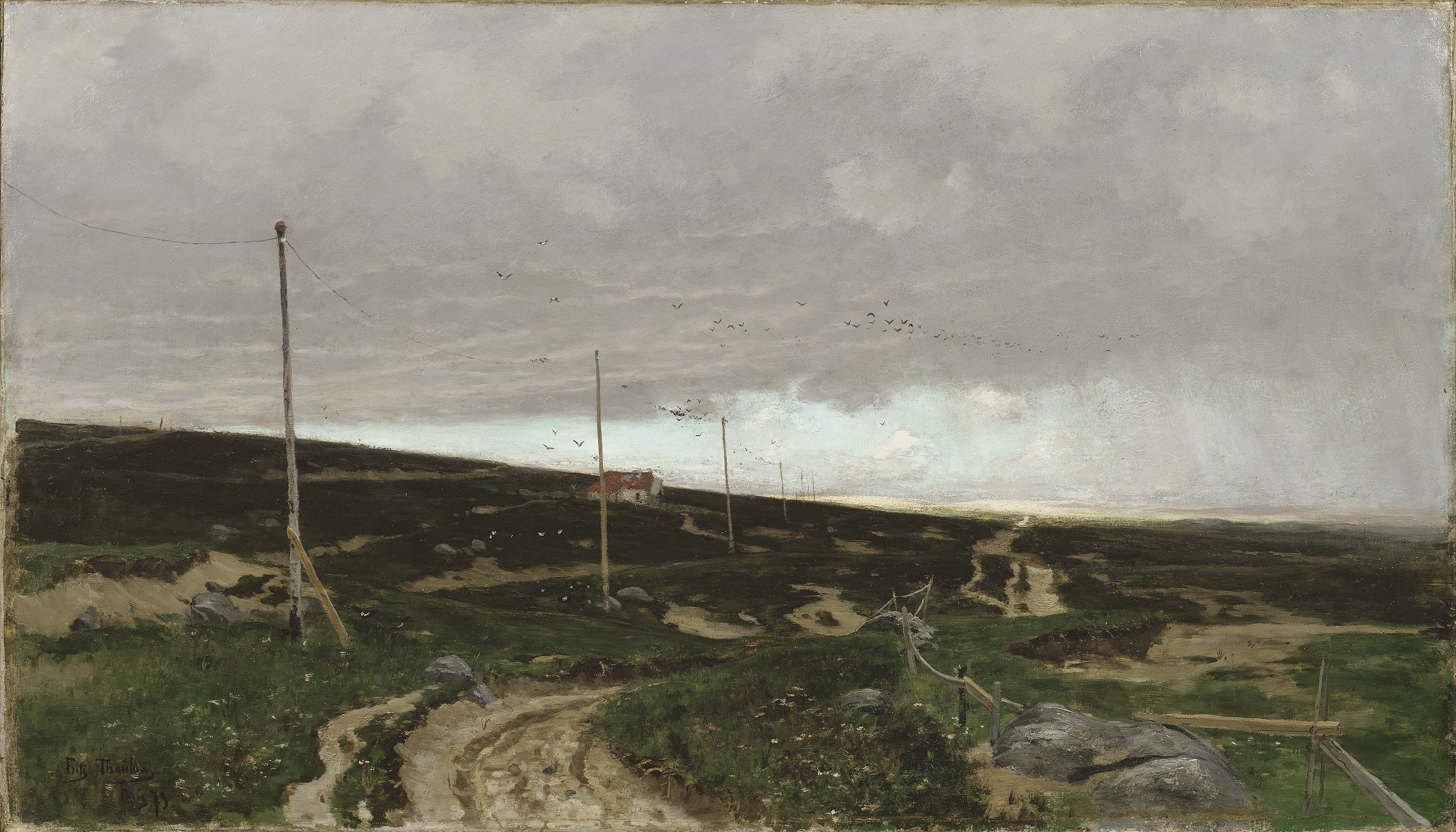
On the coast. Motif from Jaeren, Norway 1879

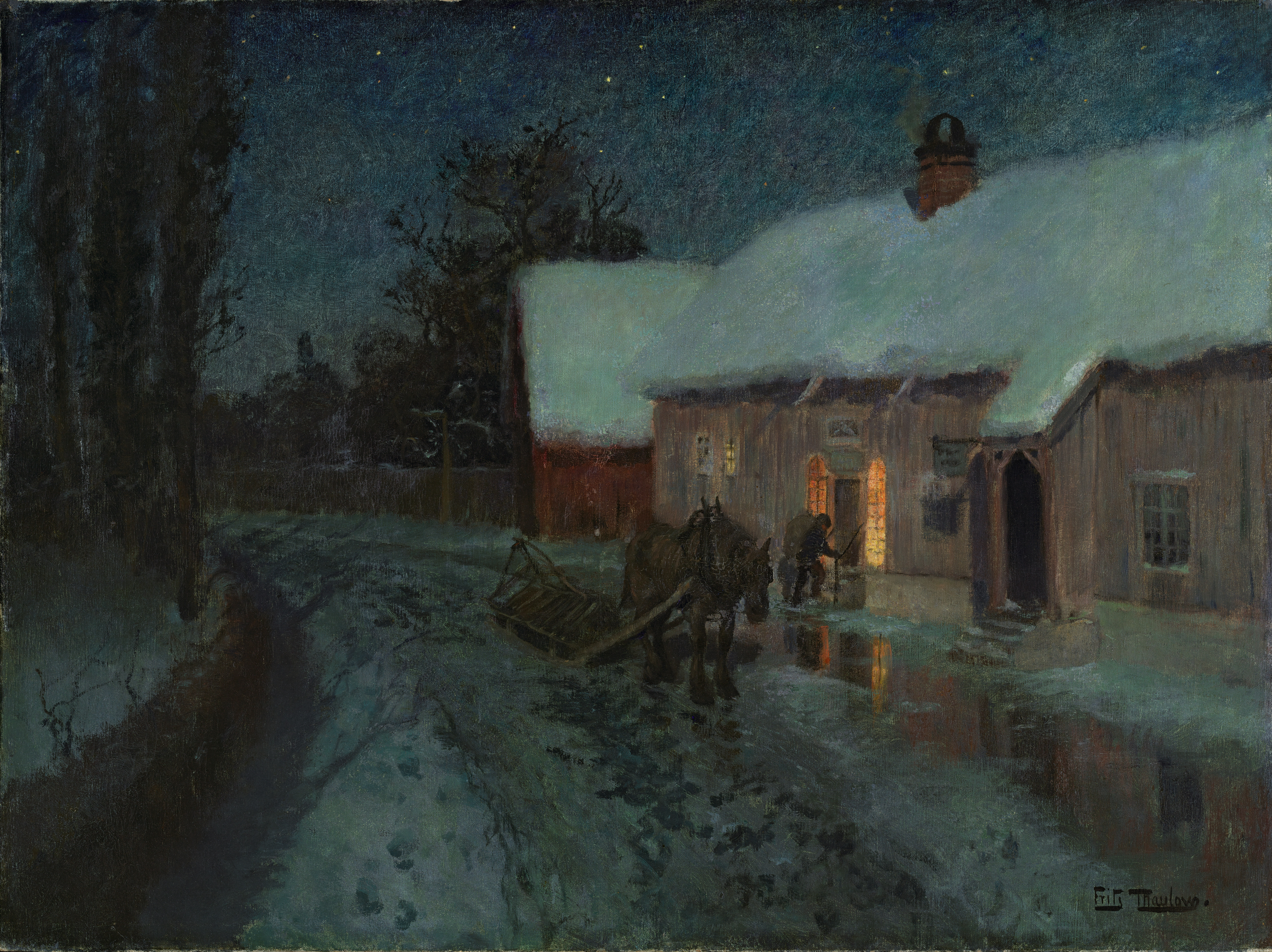
Night 1880

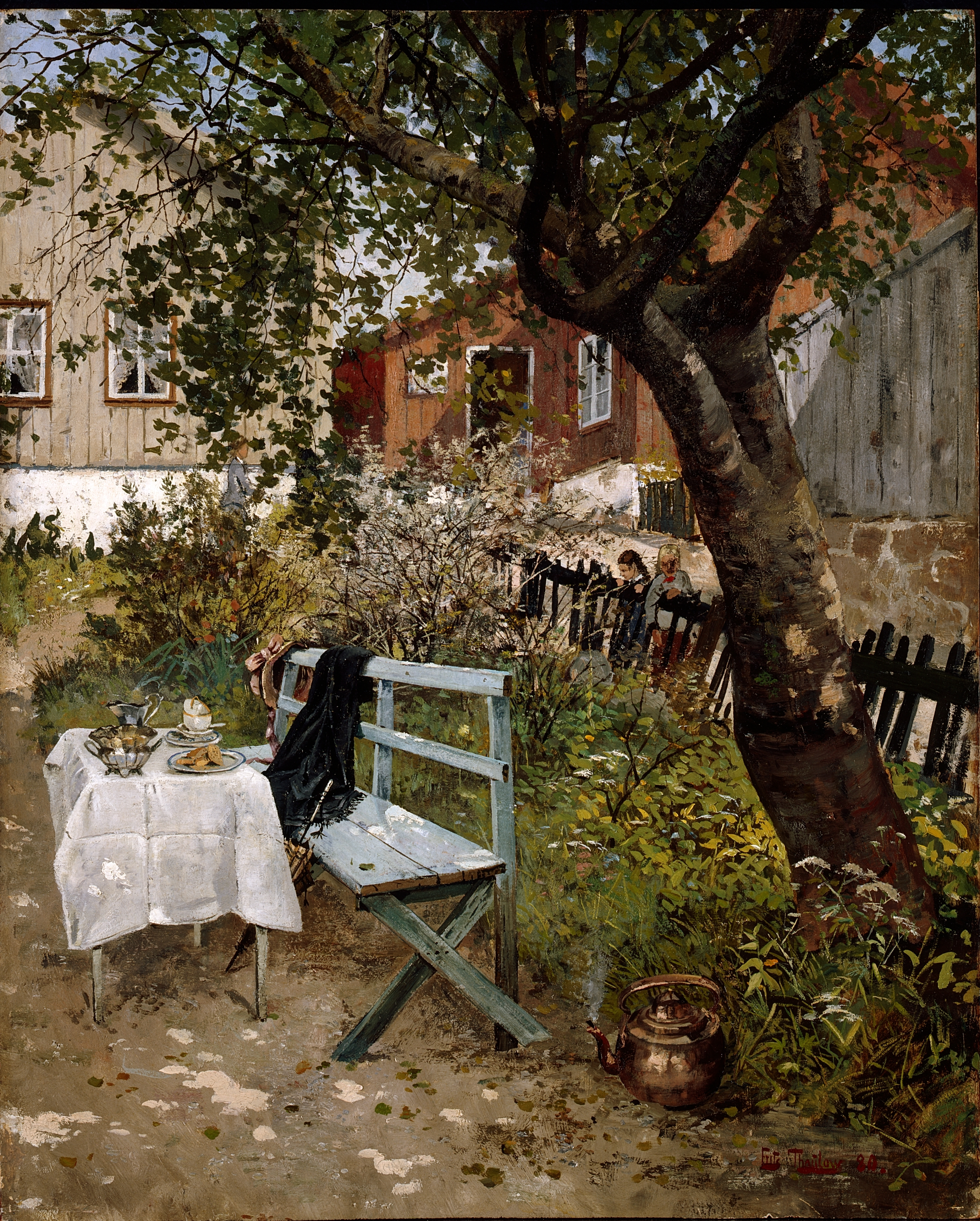
Sommerdag i hagen 1880

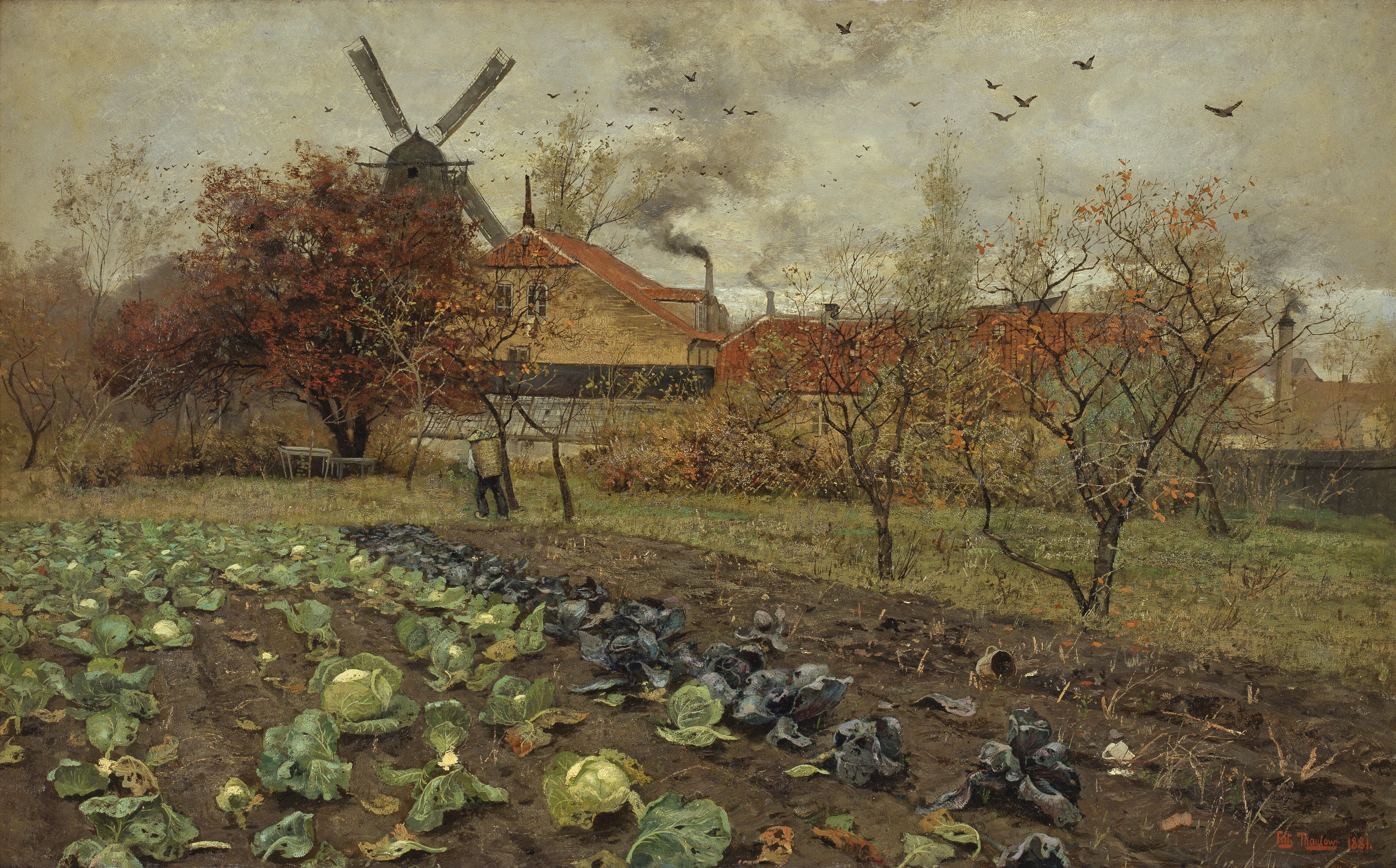
View of Amerikavej in Copenhagen 1881

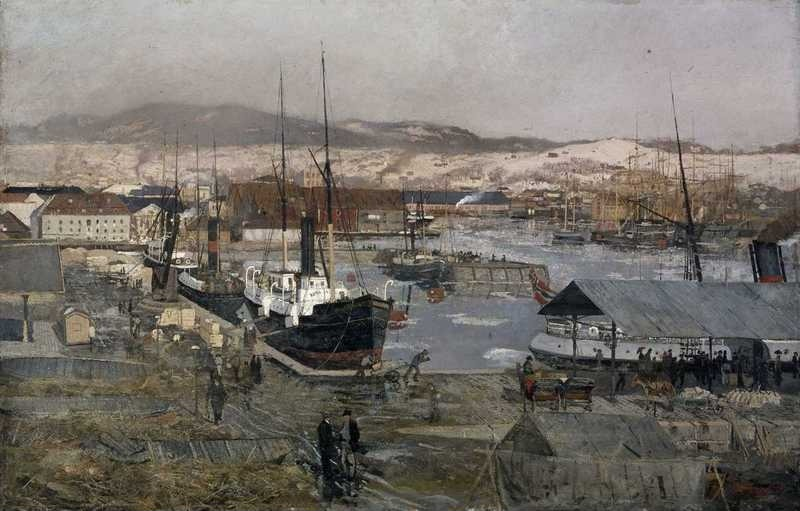
Revierhavnen 1881

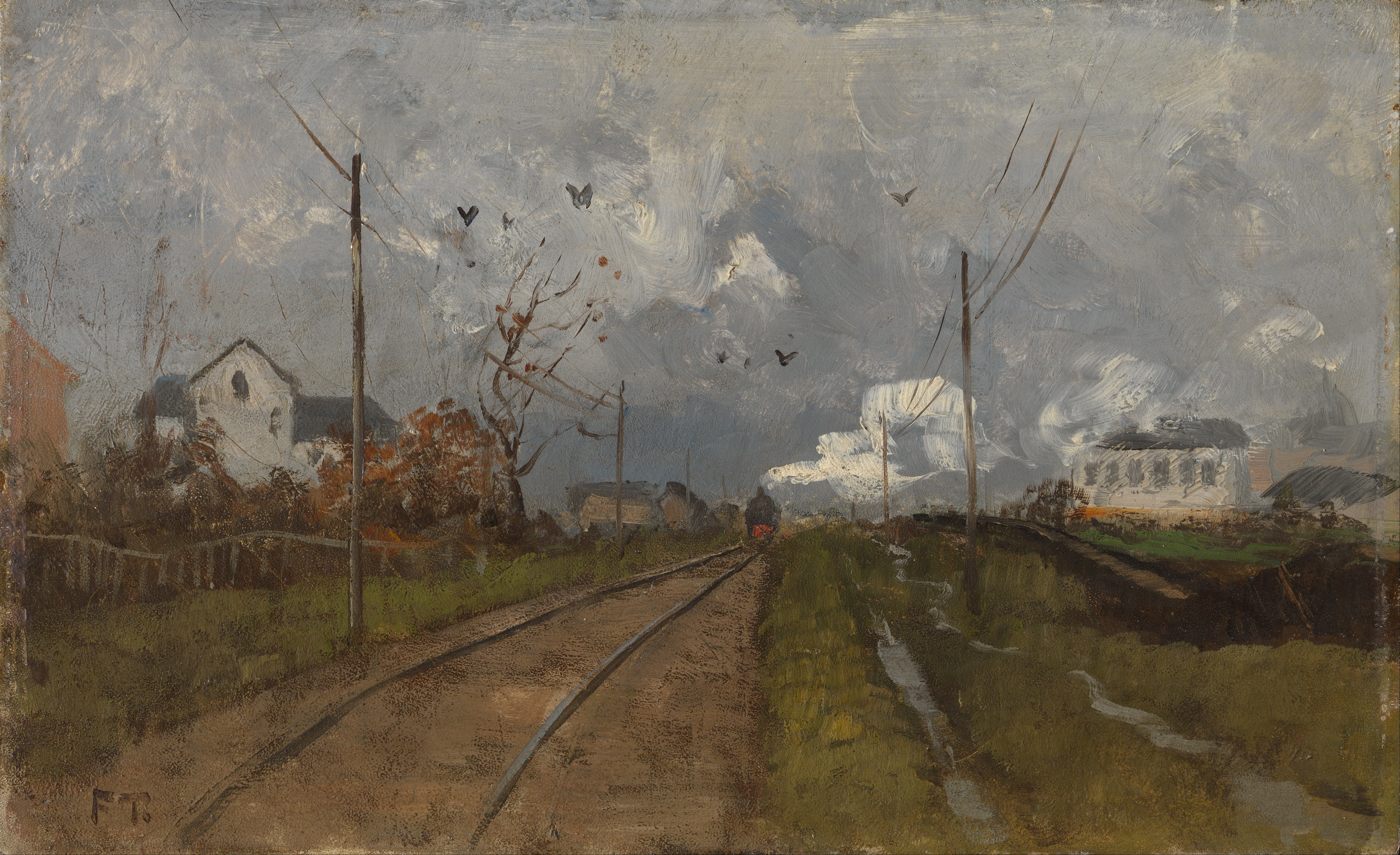
The Train is arriving 1881

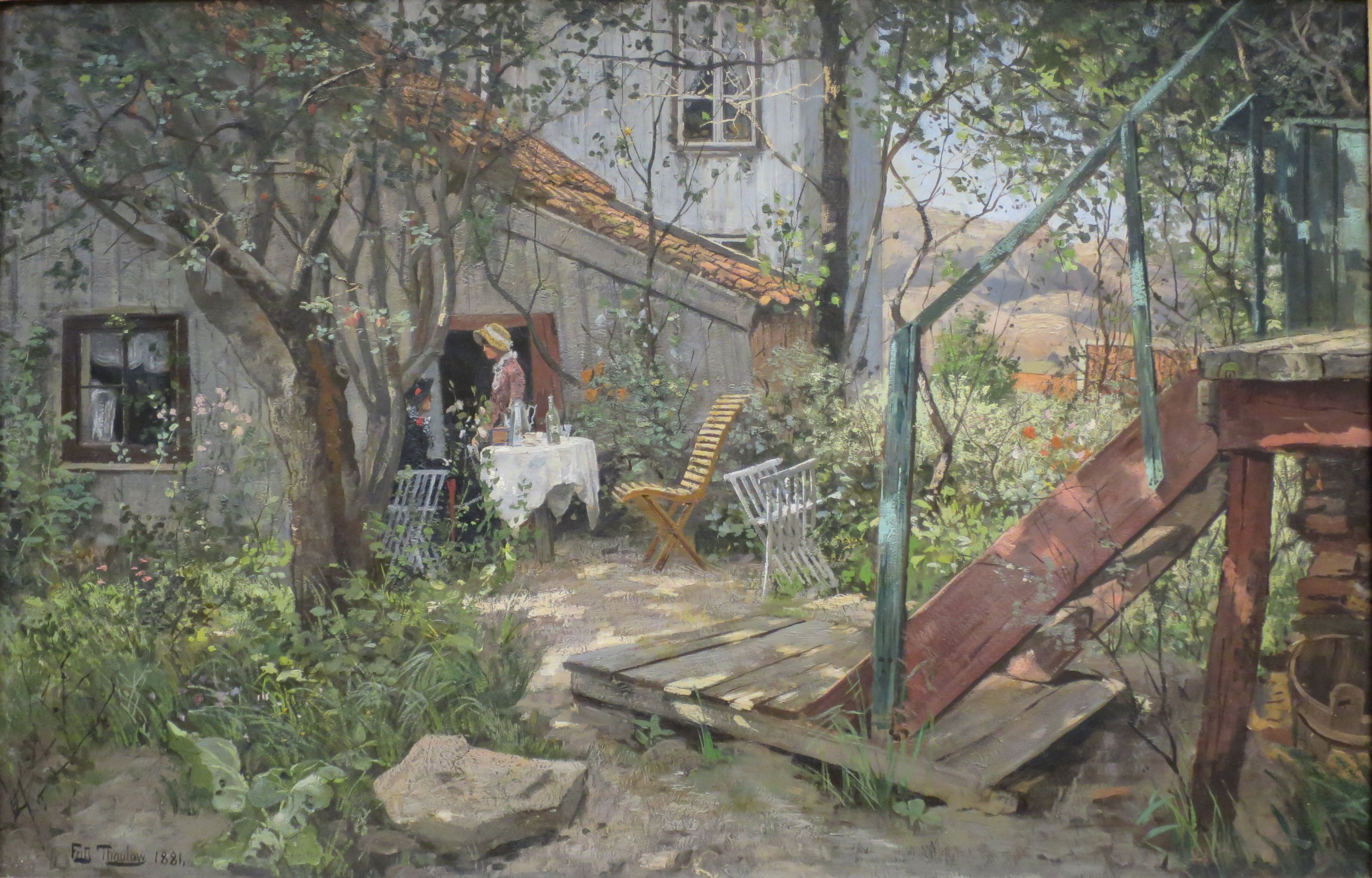
Summer Day 1881

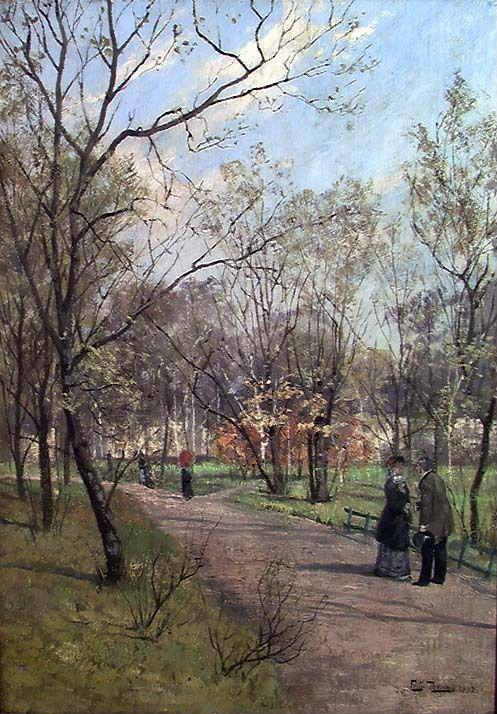
The Park of the Royal Palace, Oslo 1882

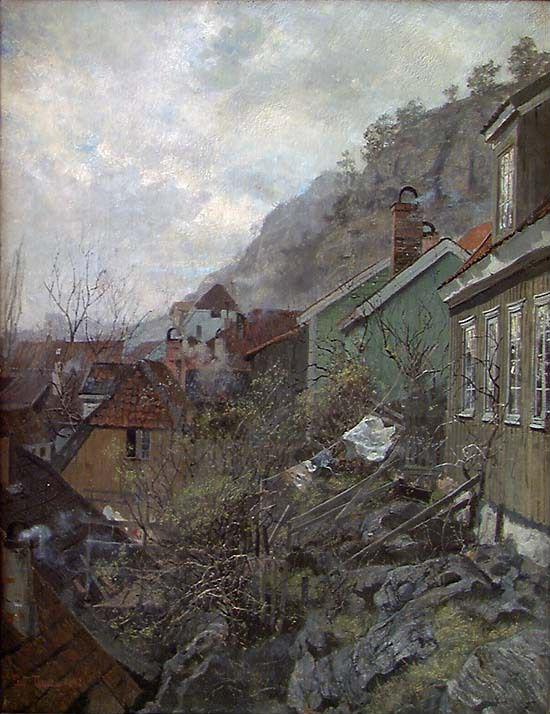
Houses in Kragerø 1882

Rock, Motif from Kragero 1882

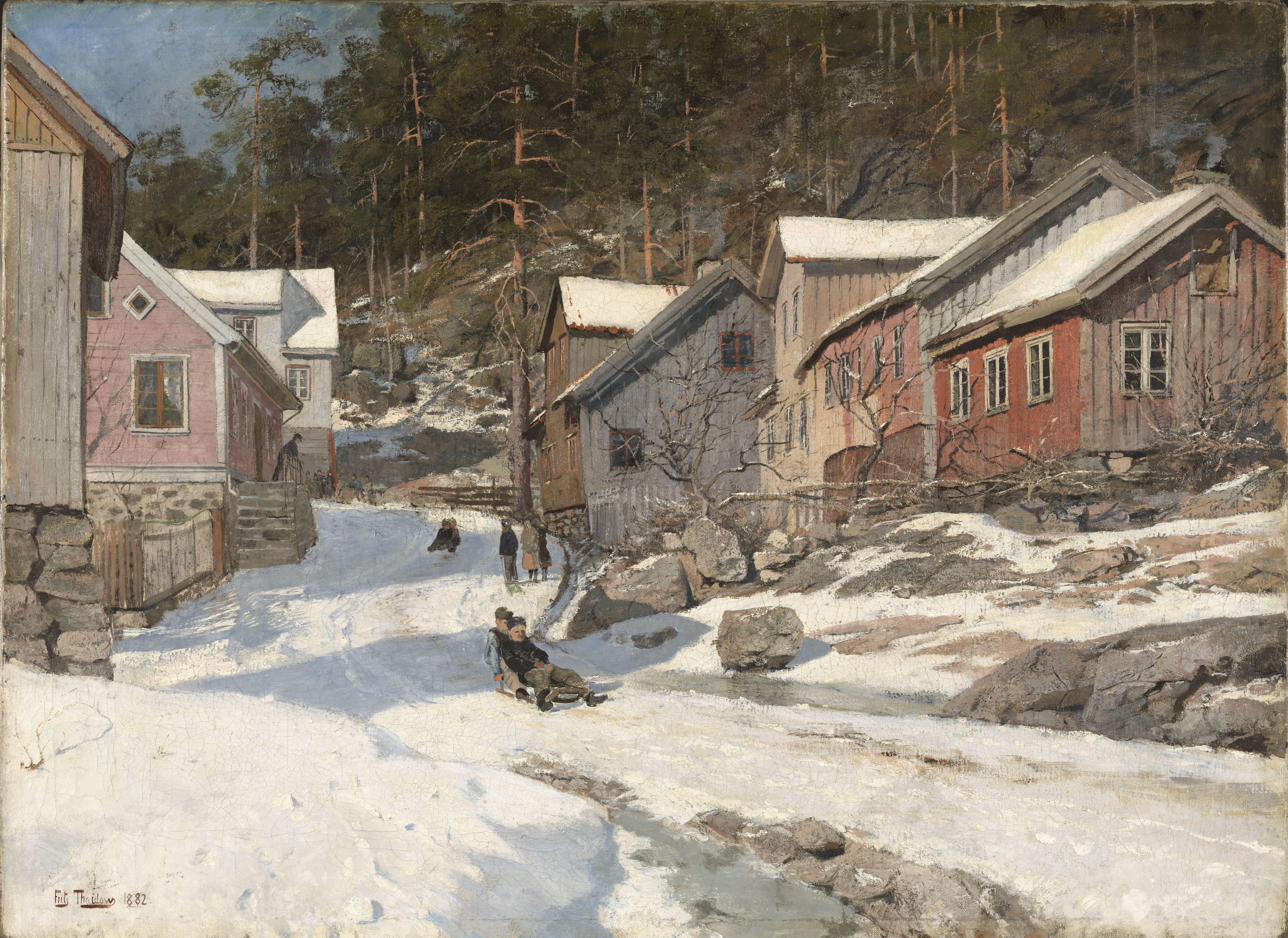
Street in Kragero 1882

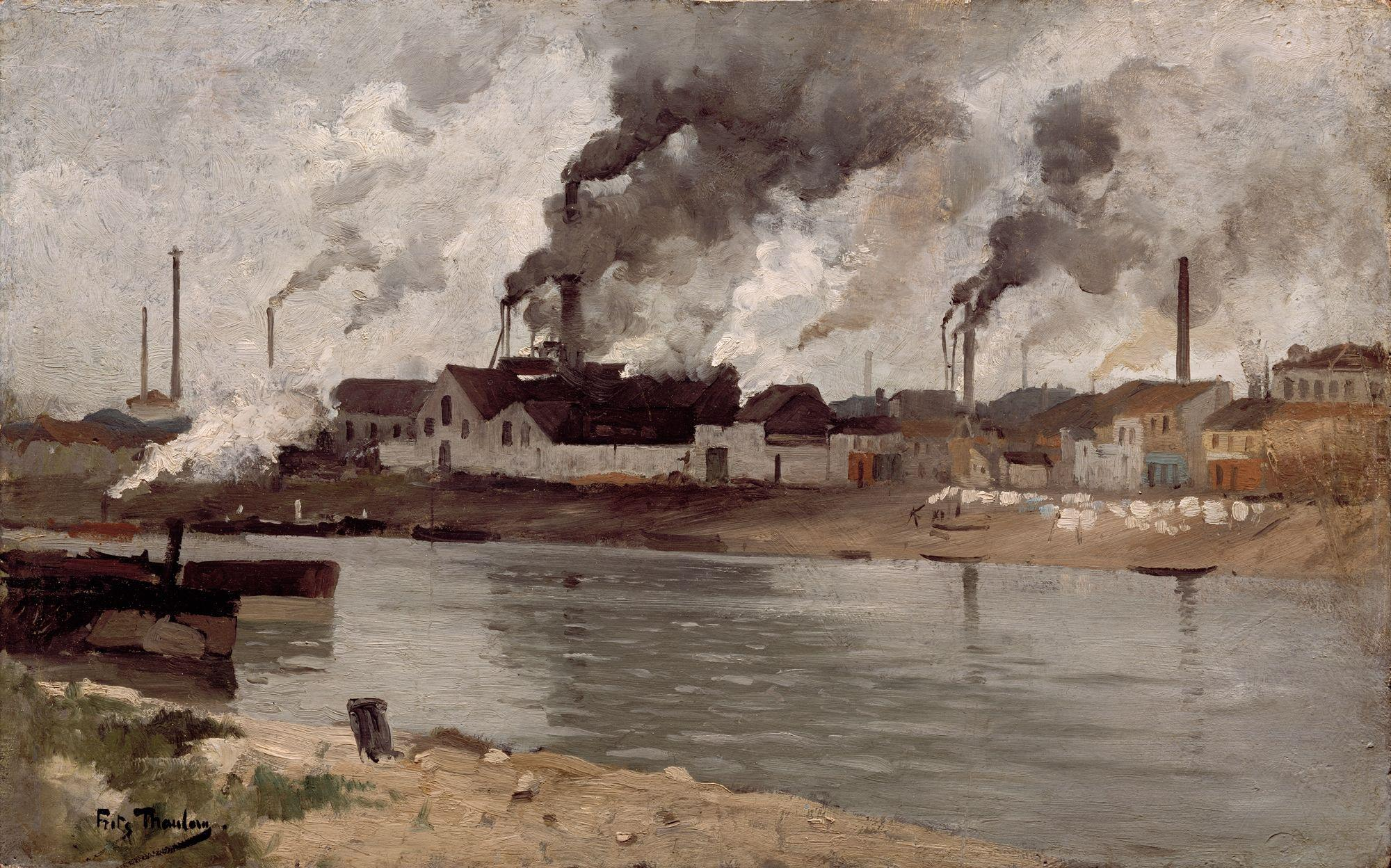
Factories in Ivry 1883

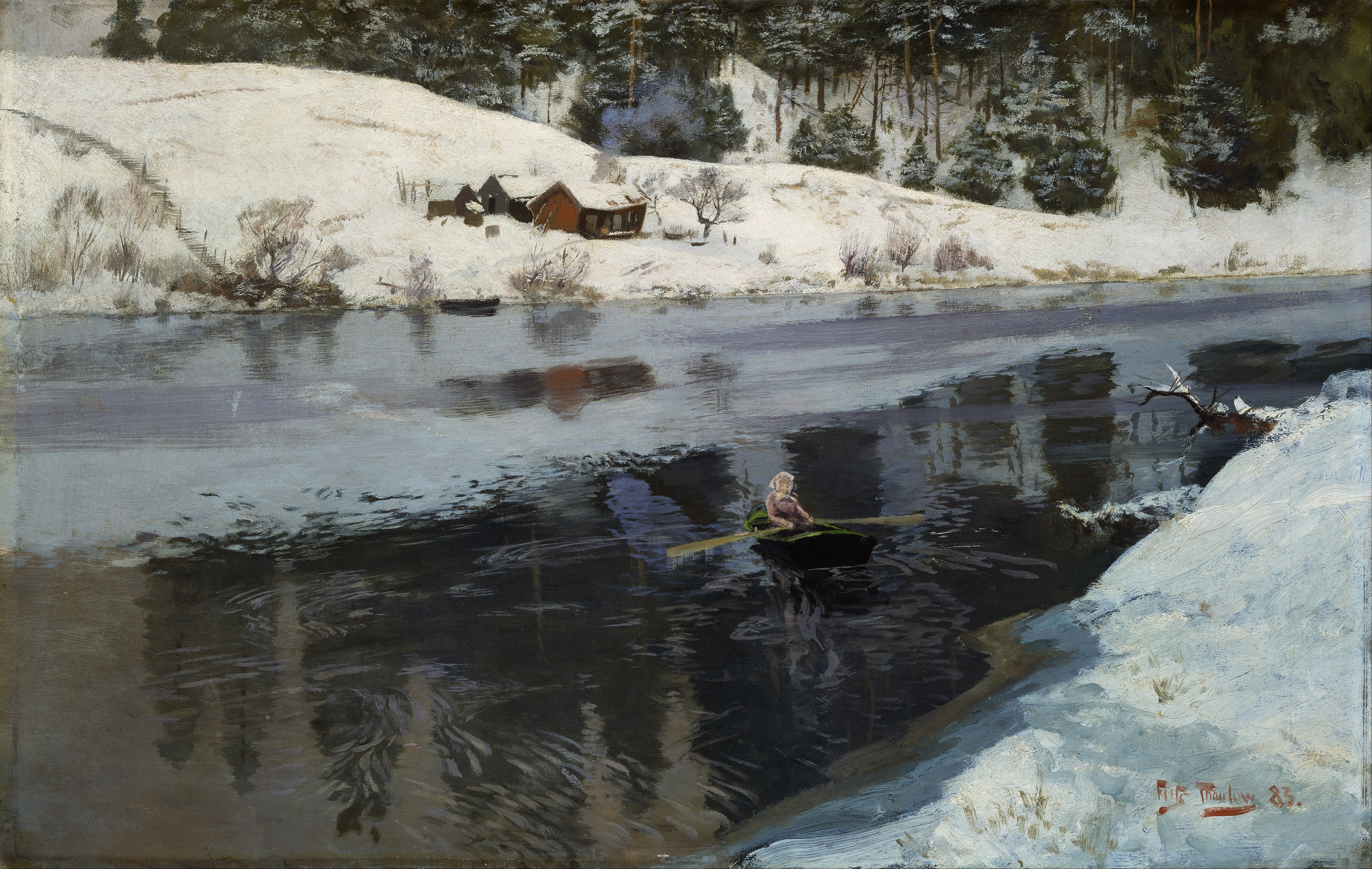
Winter at the River Simoa 1883

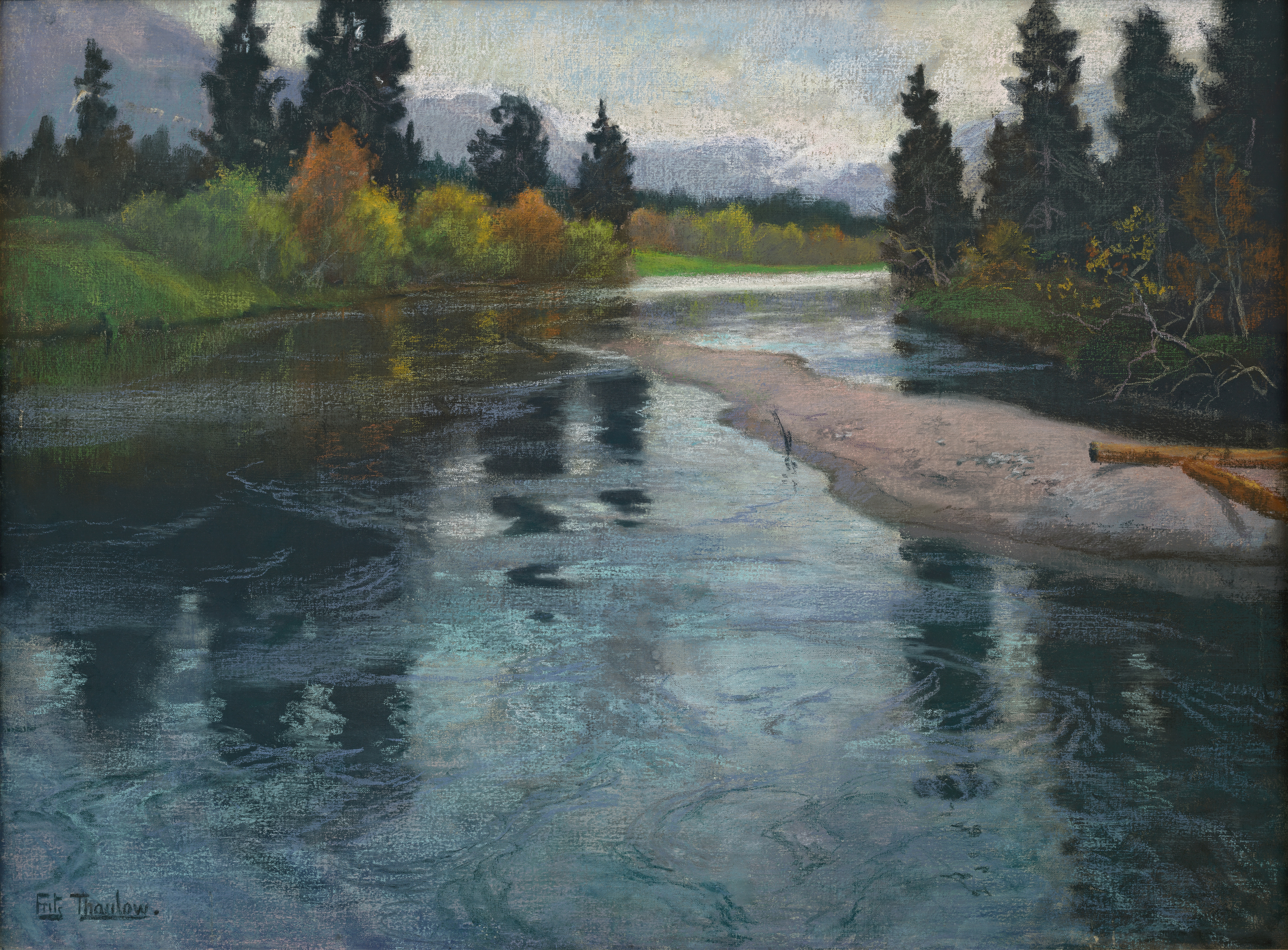
A River 1883

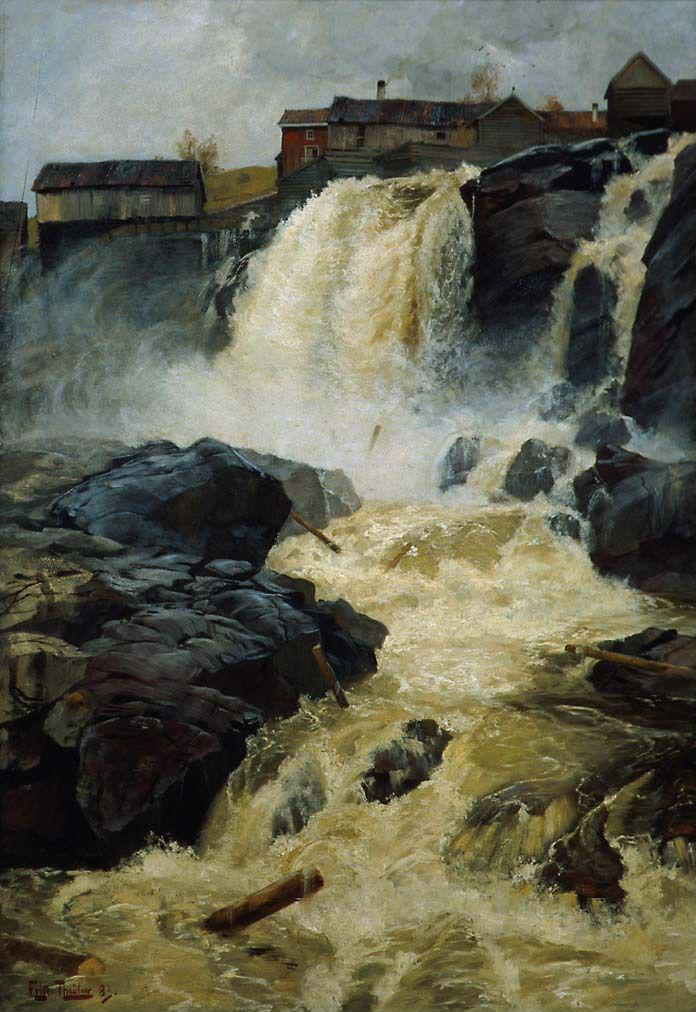
The Waterfall Haugfossen 1883

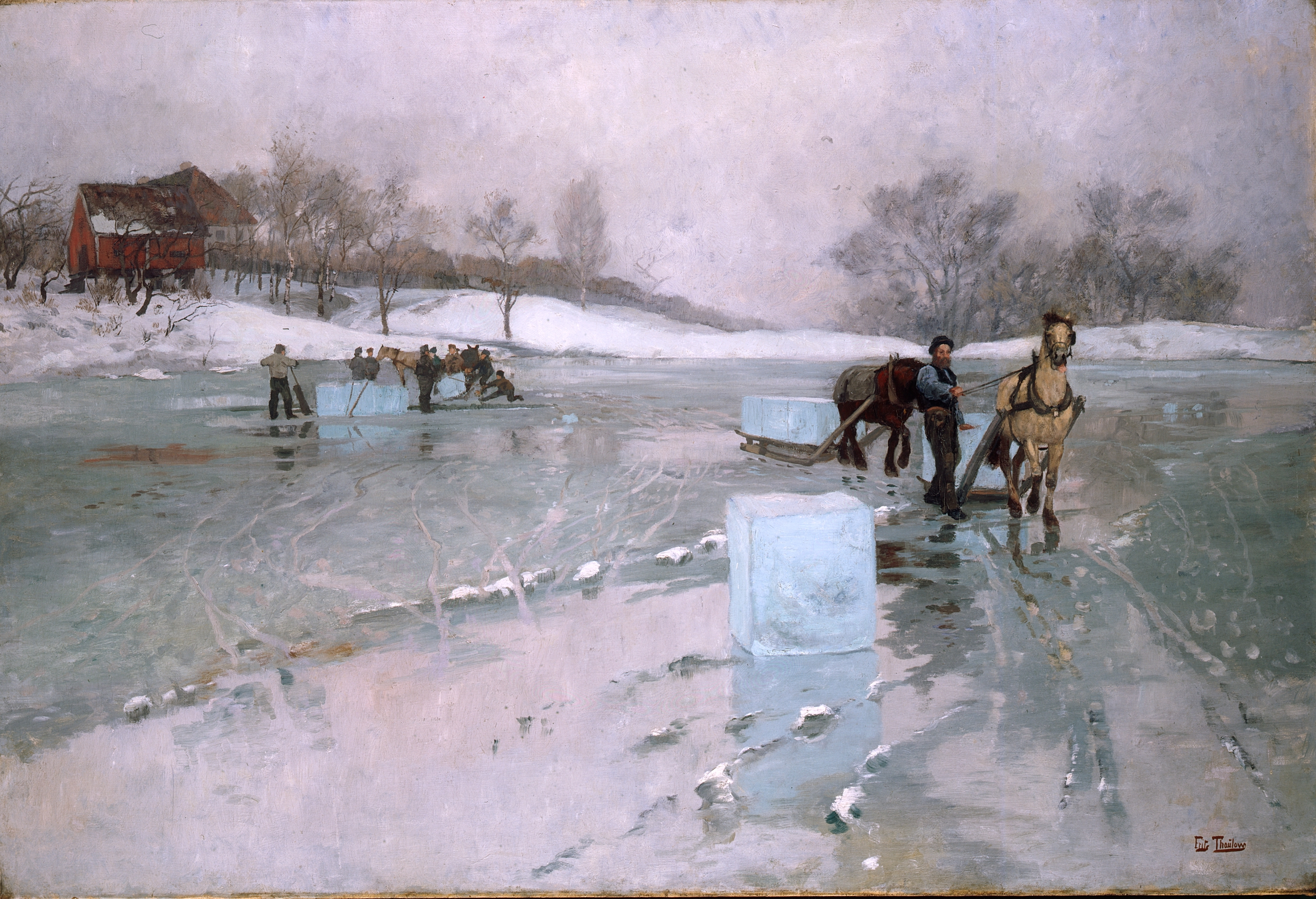
Iskjøring 1884

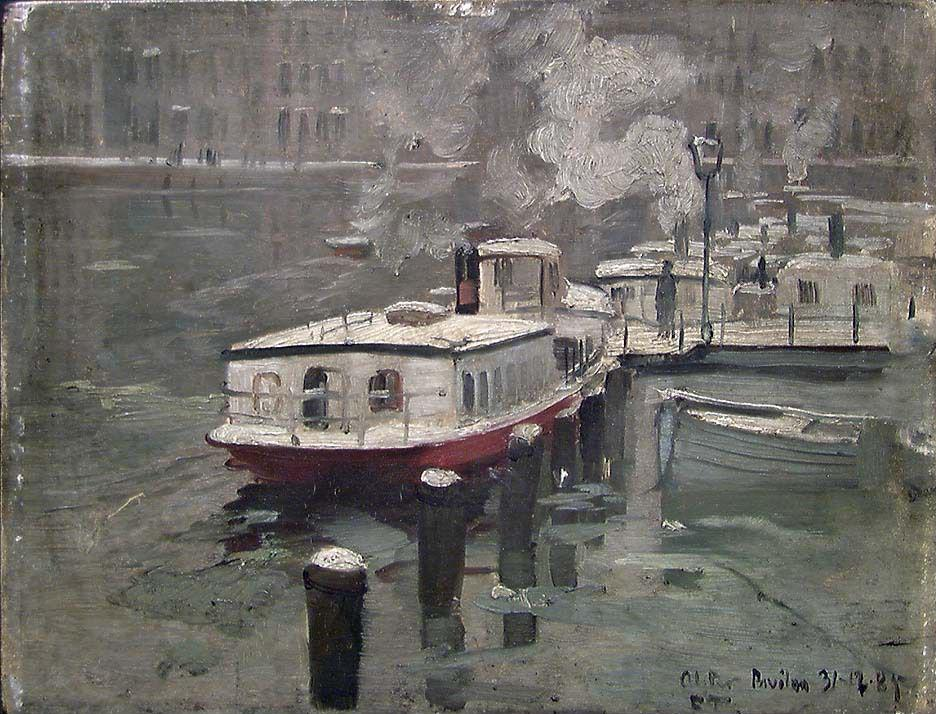
View from the Alster 1885

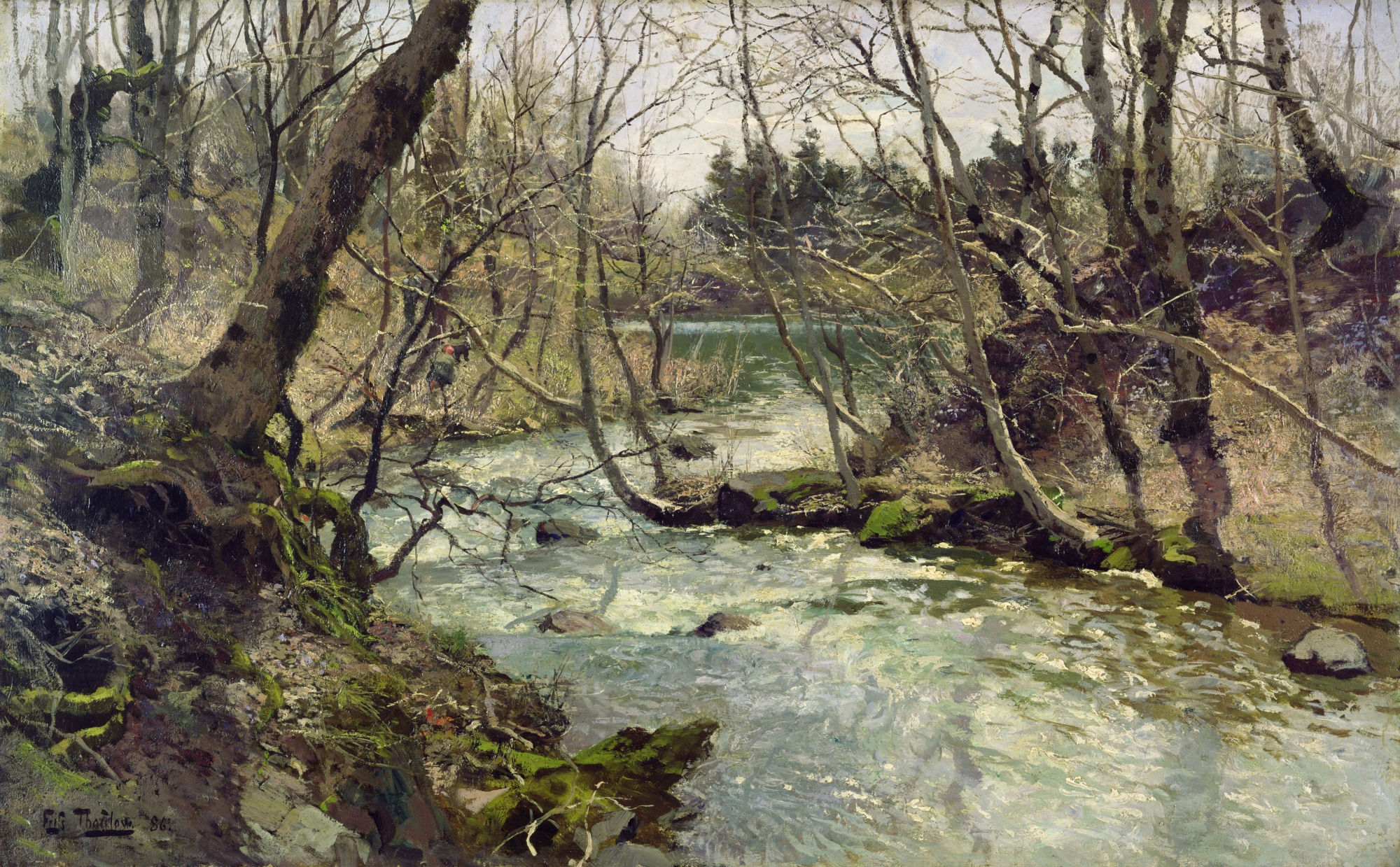
Elv 1886

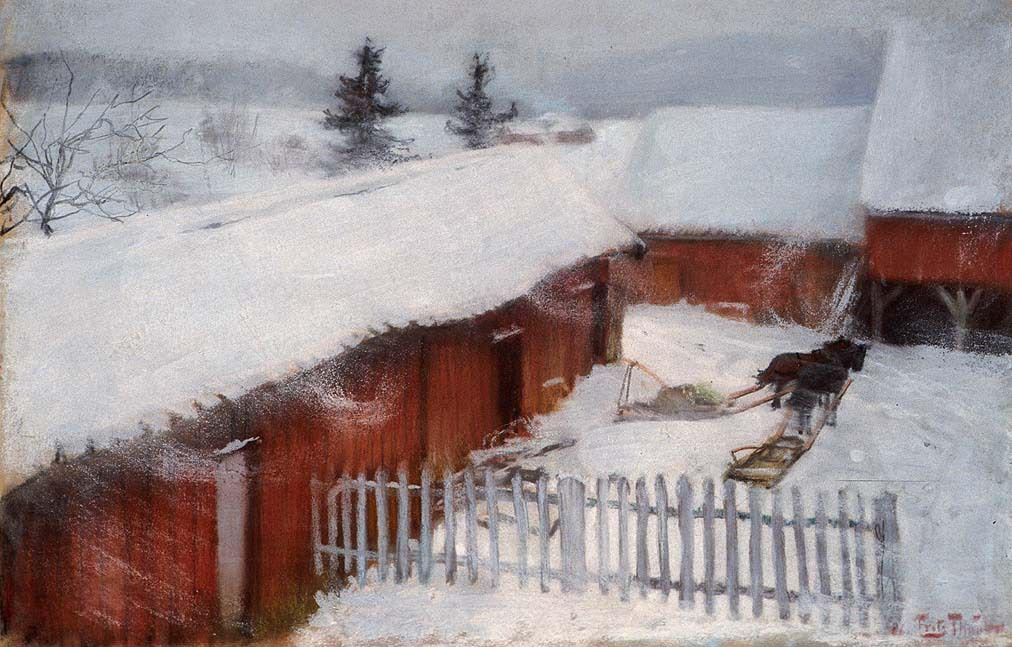
Winter 1886

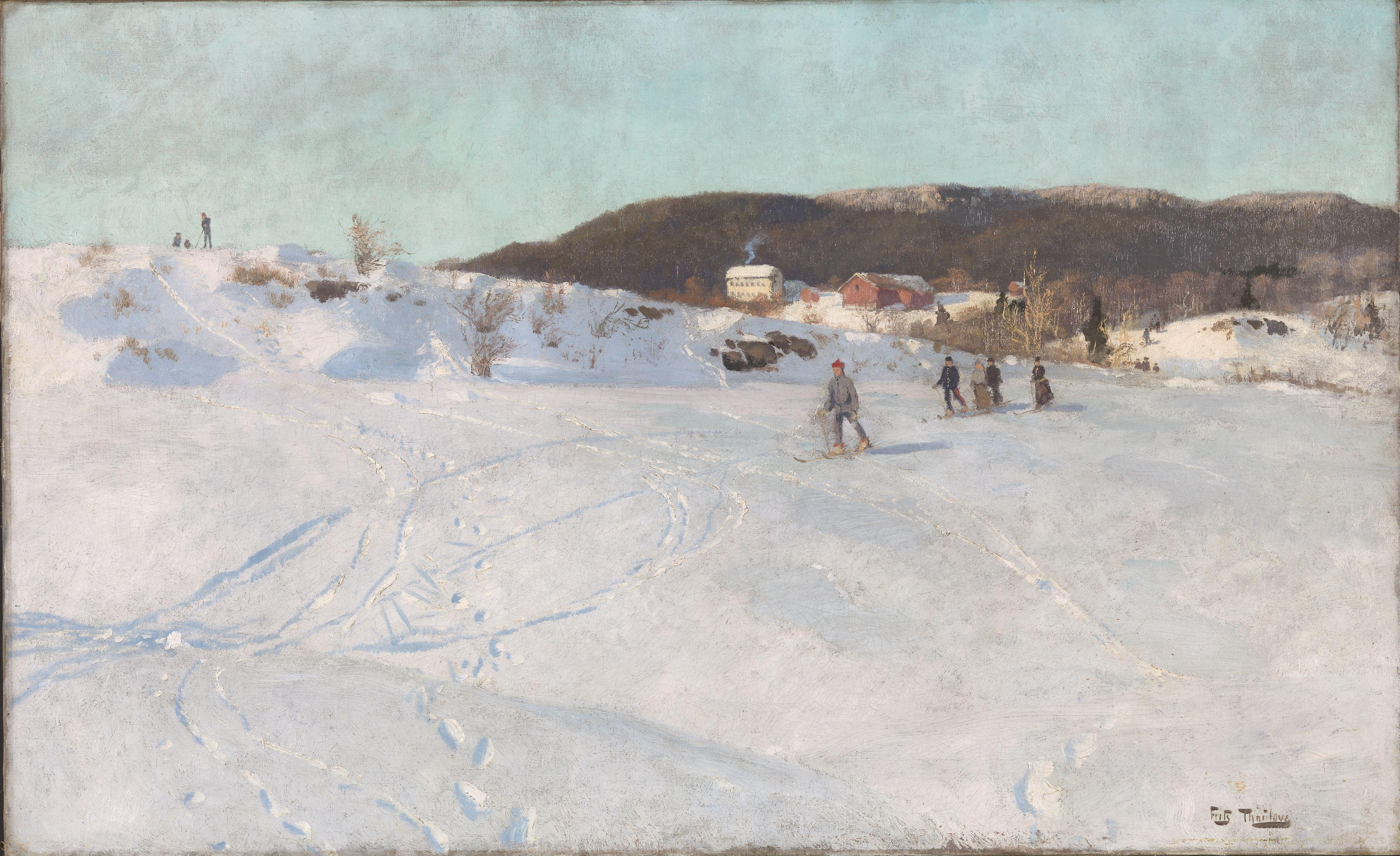
Vinter, Vestre Aker 1886–1887

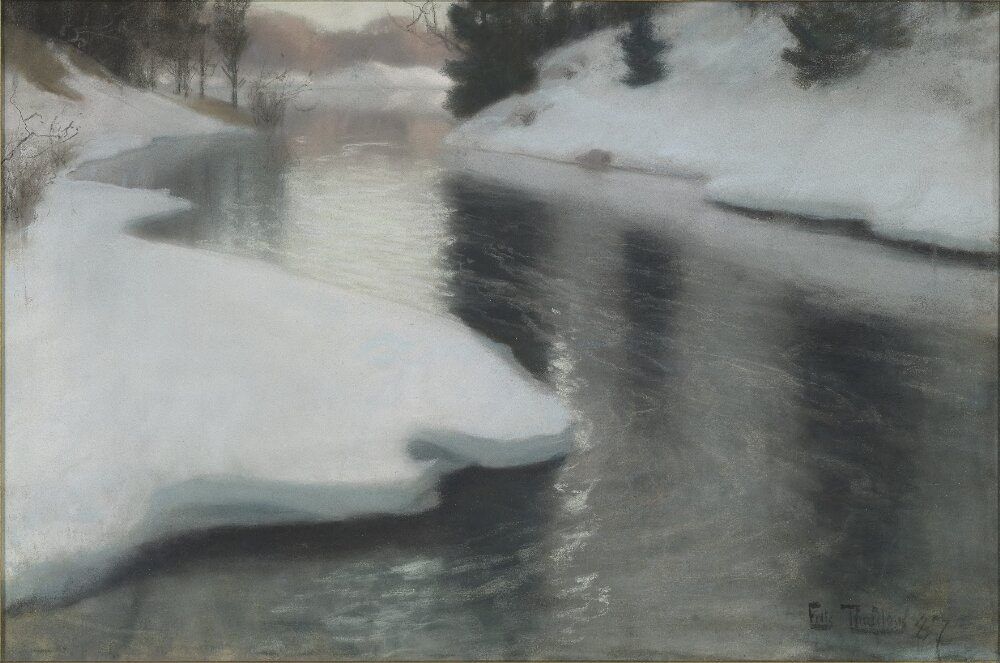
Spring Thaw 1887

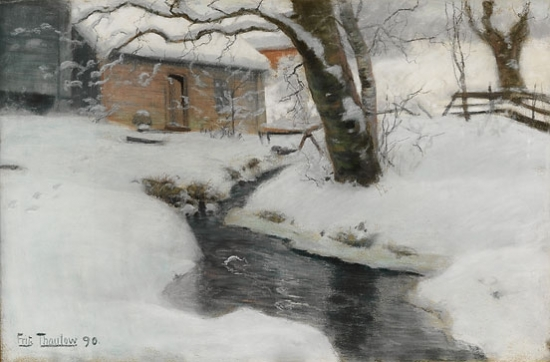
Norsk vinterlandskap 1890

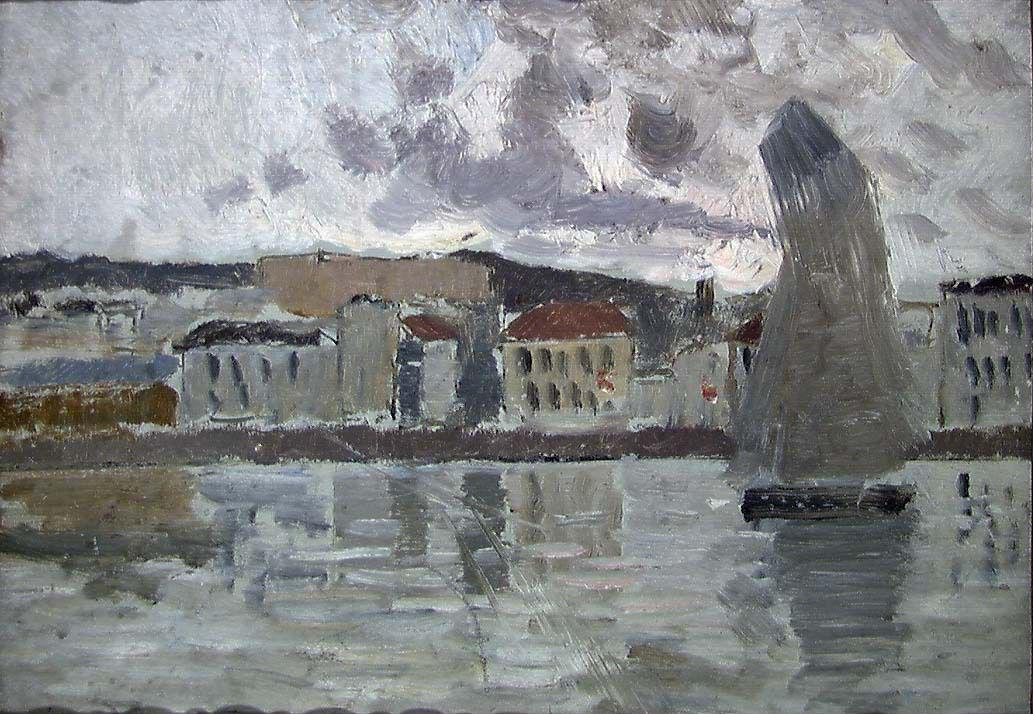
The Sailing Boat 1890

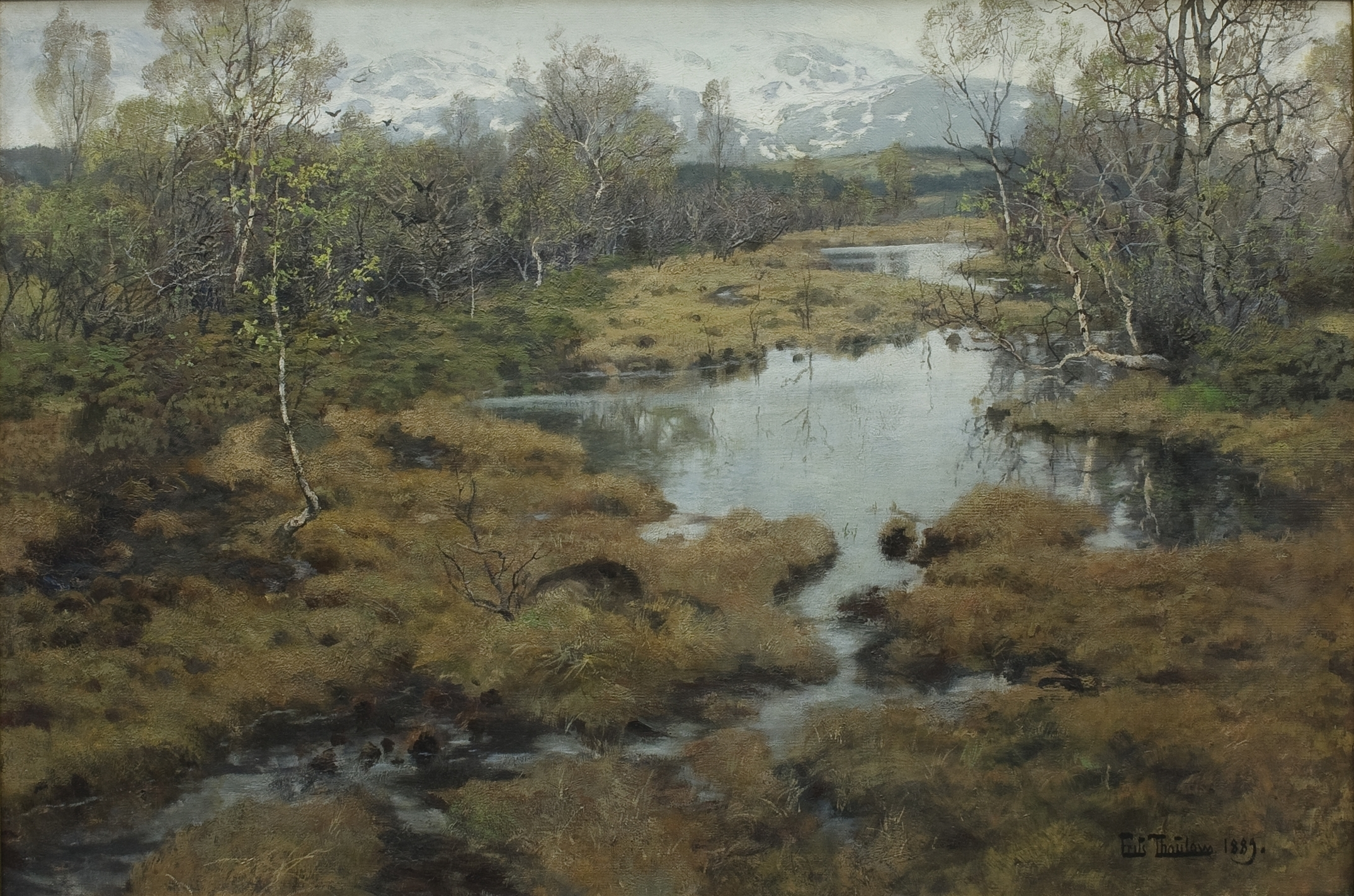
Løvsprett 1891

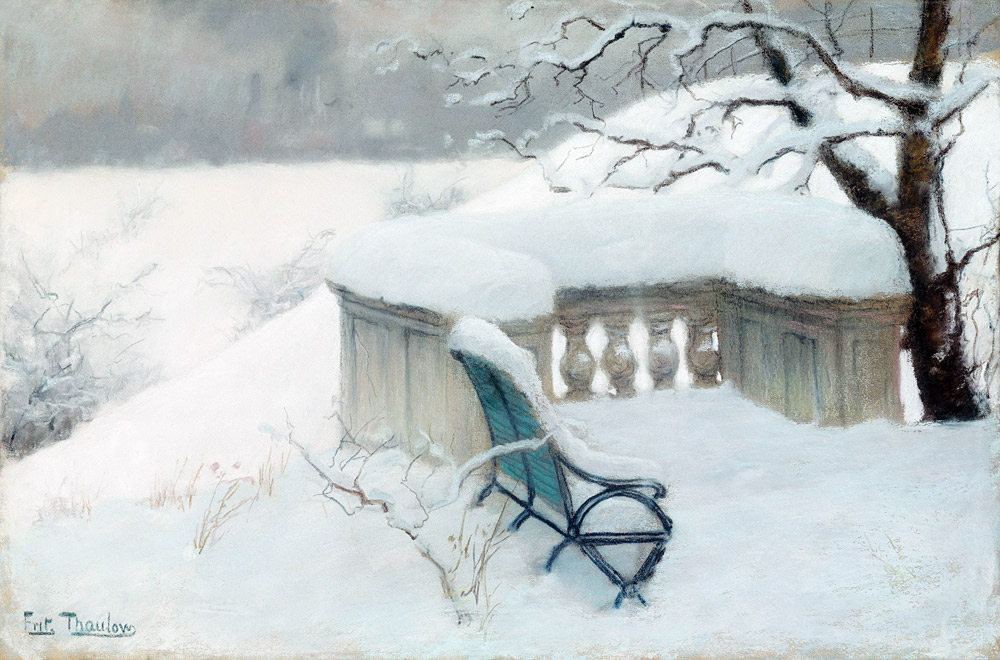
Bank im Schnee, aus dem Elbpark 1891

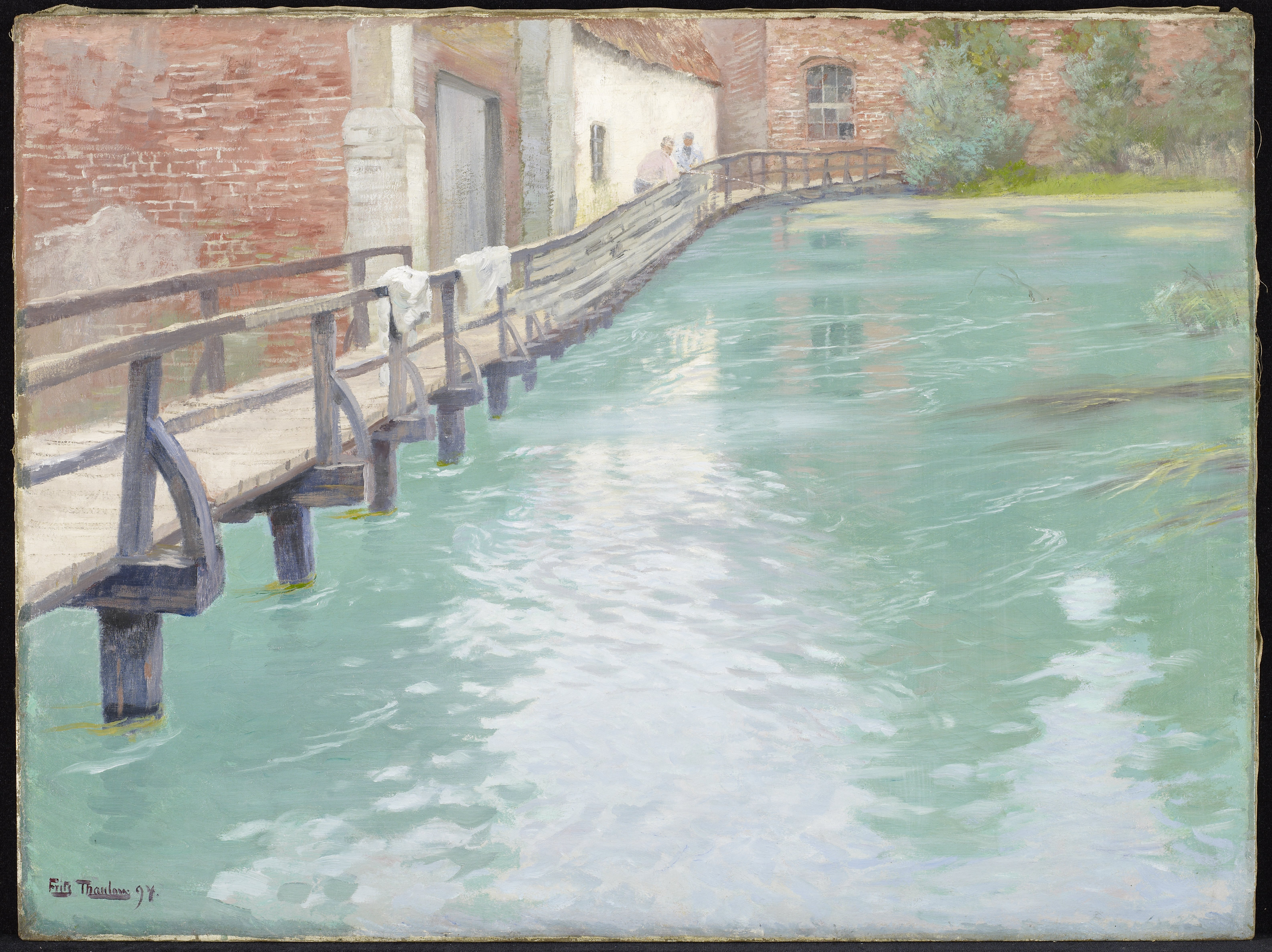
The Mills at Montreuil-sur-Mer, Normandy 1891

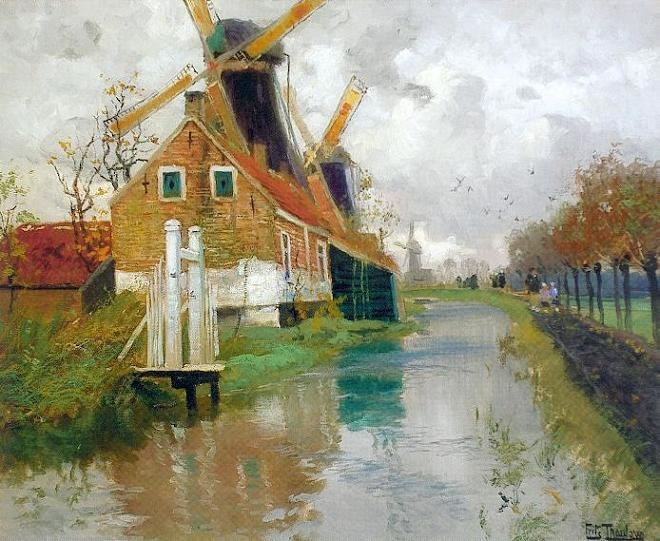
Landschap met molen, Holland 1892

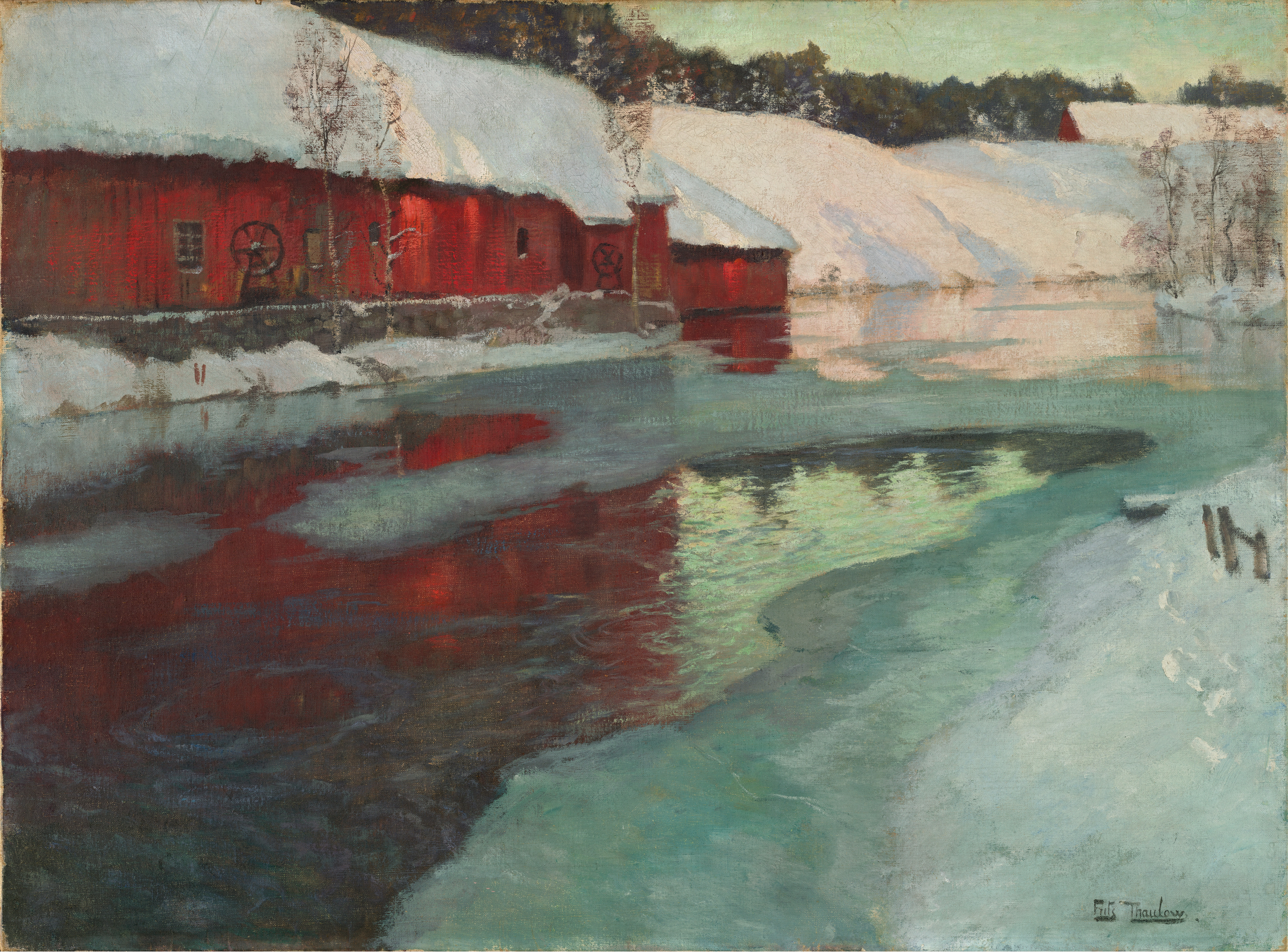
Freezing River 1892

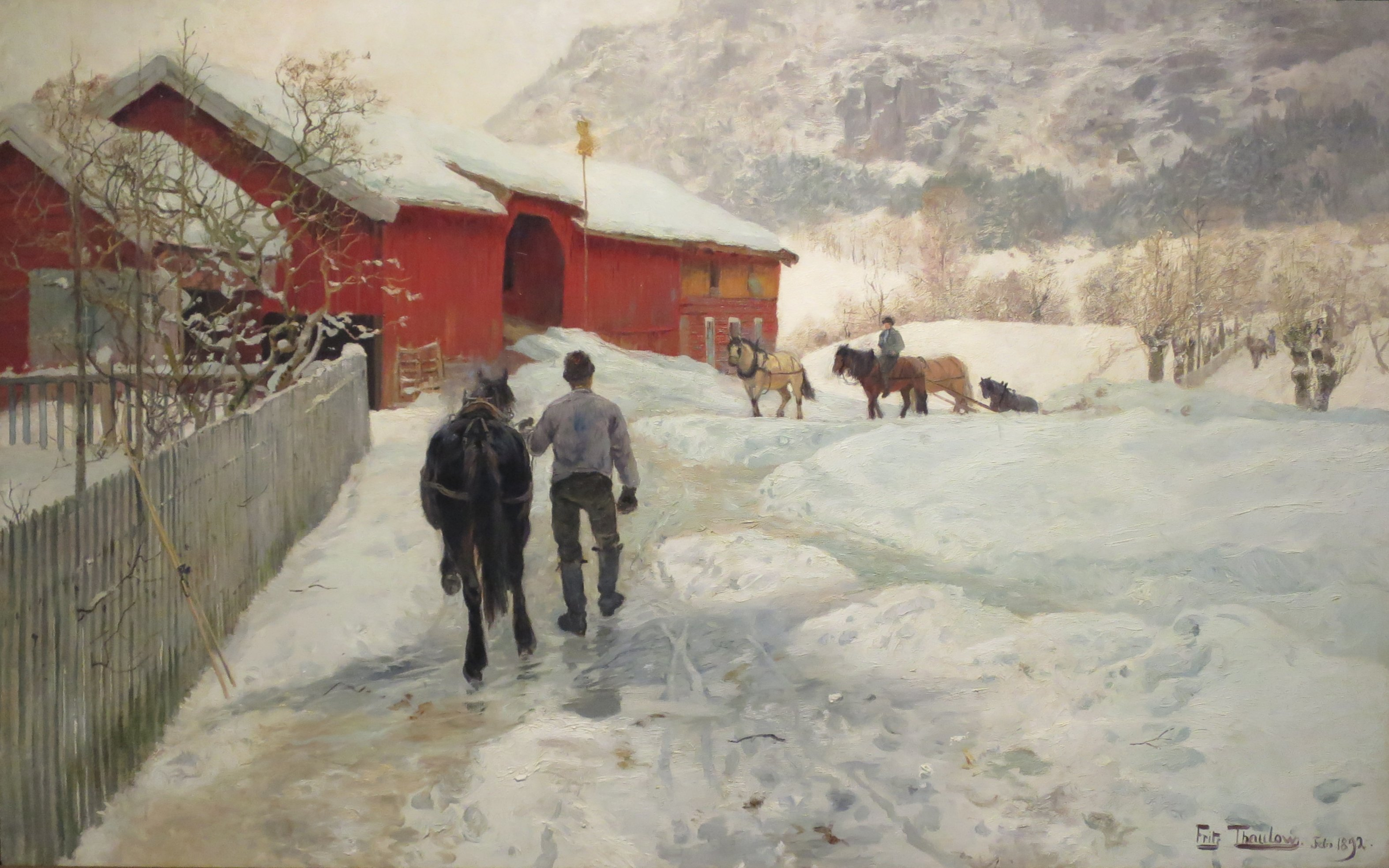
Timber Haulers Returning Home 1892

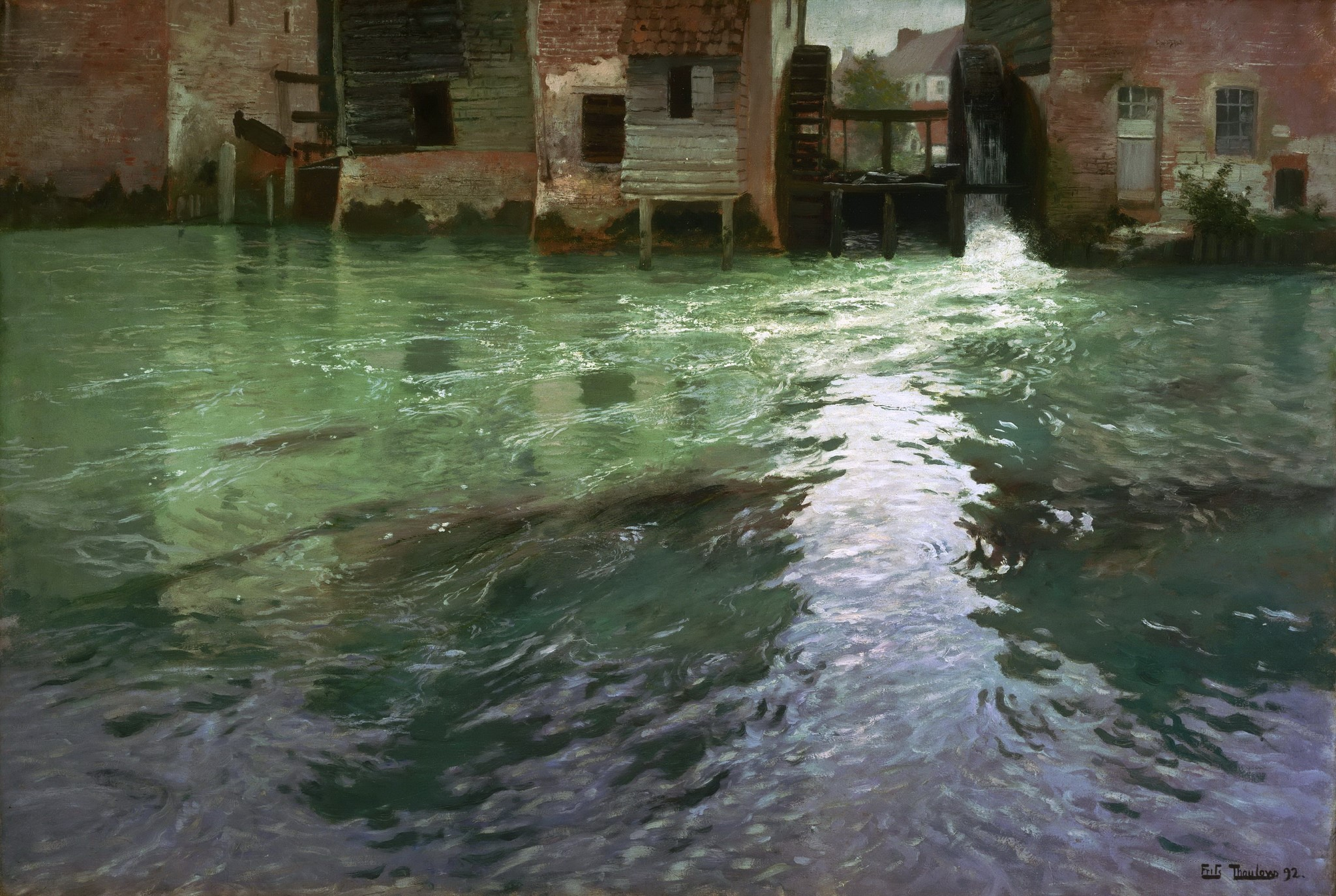
Watermill 1892

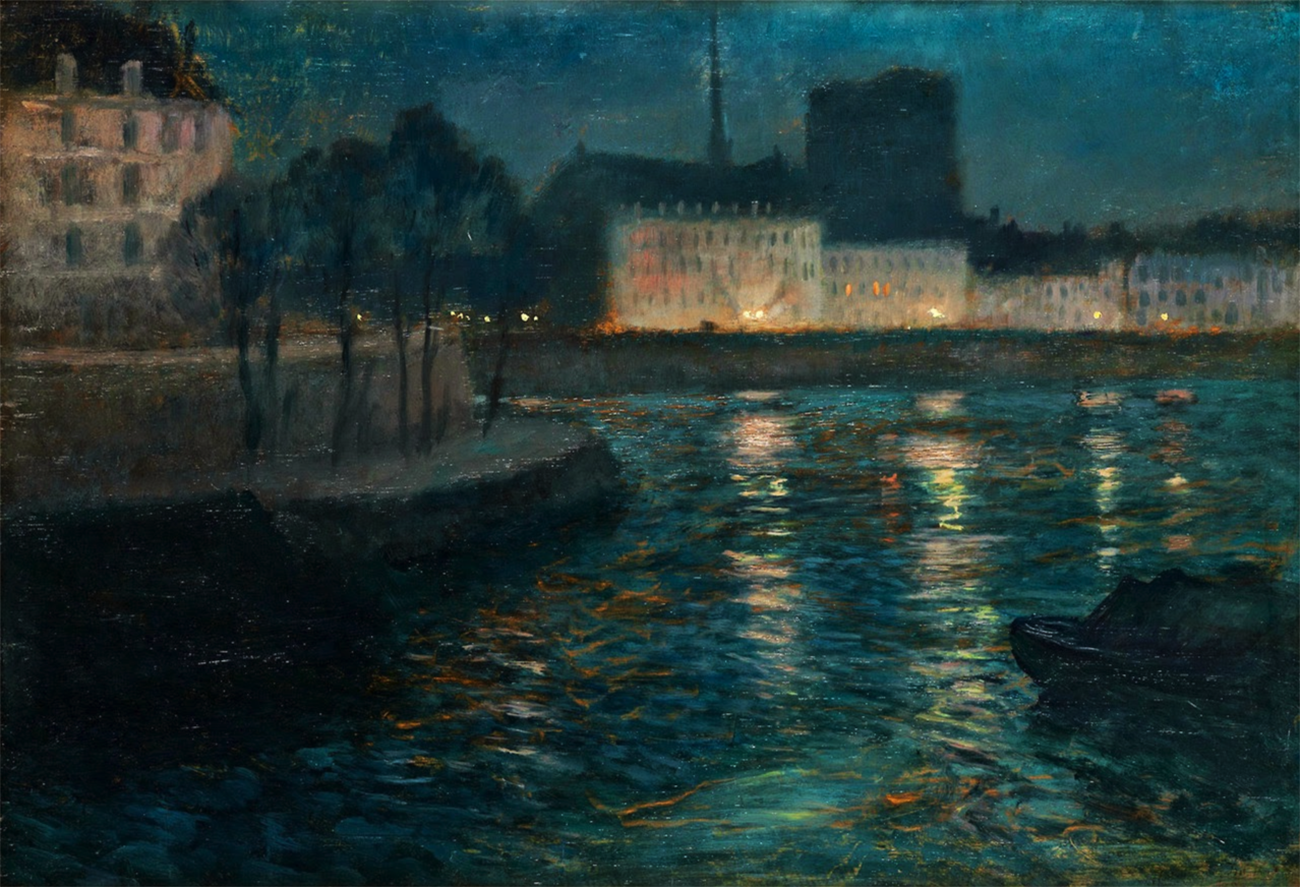
Ambiance Du Soir 1893

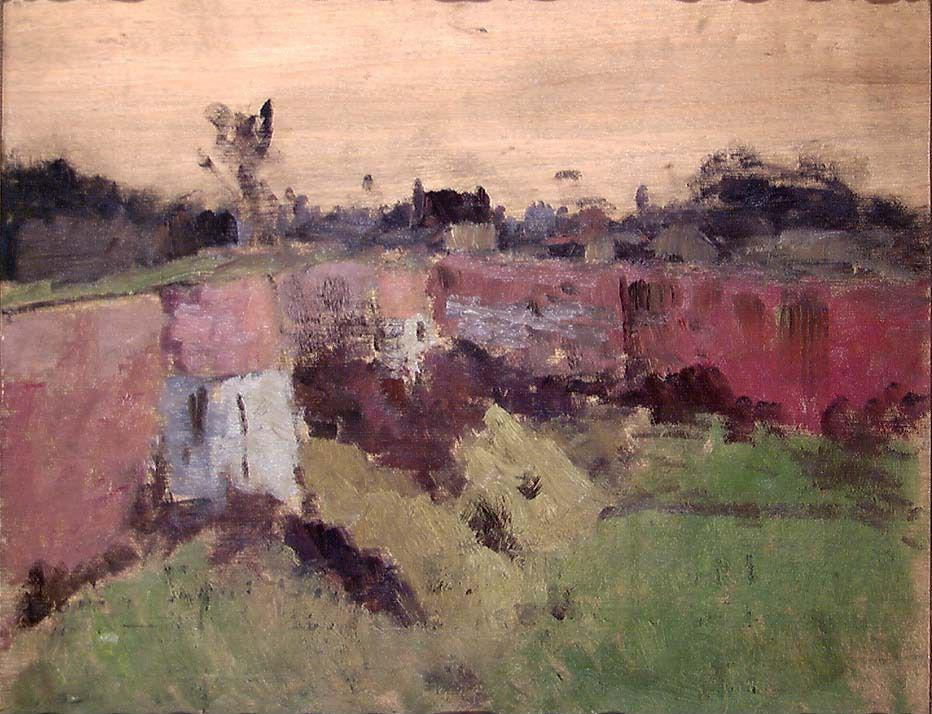
Outside the Fortification Walls at Montreuil 1893

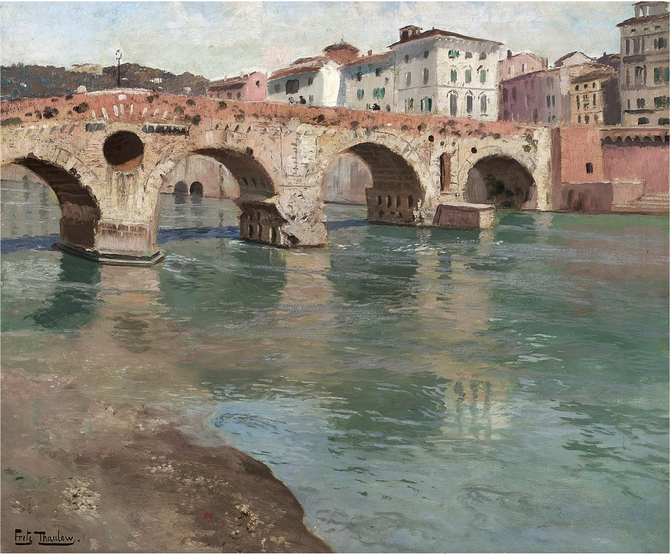
Ponte Pietra, Verona 1894

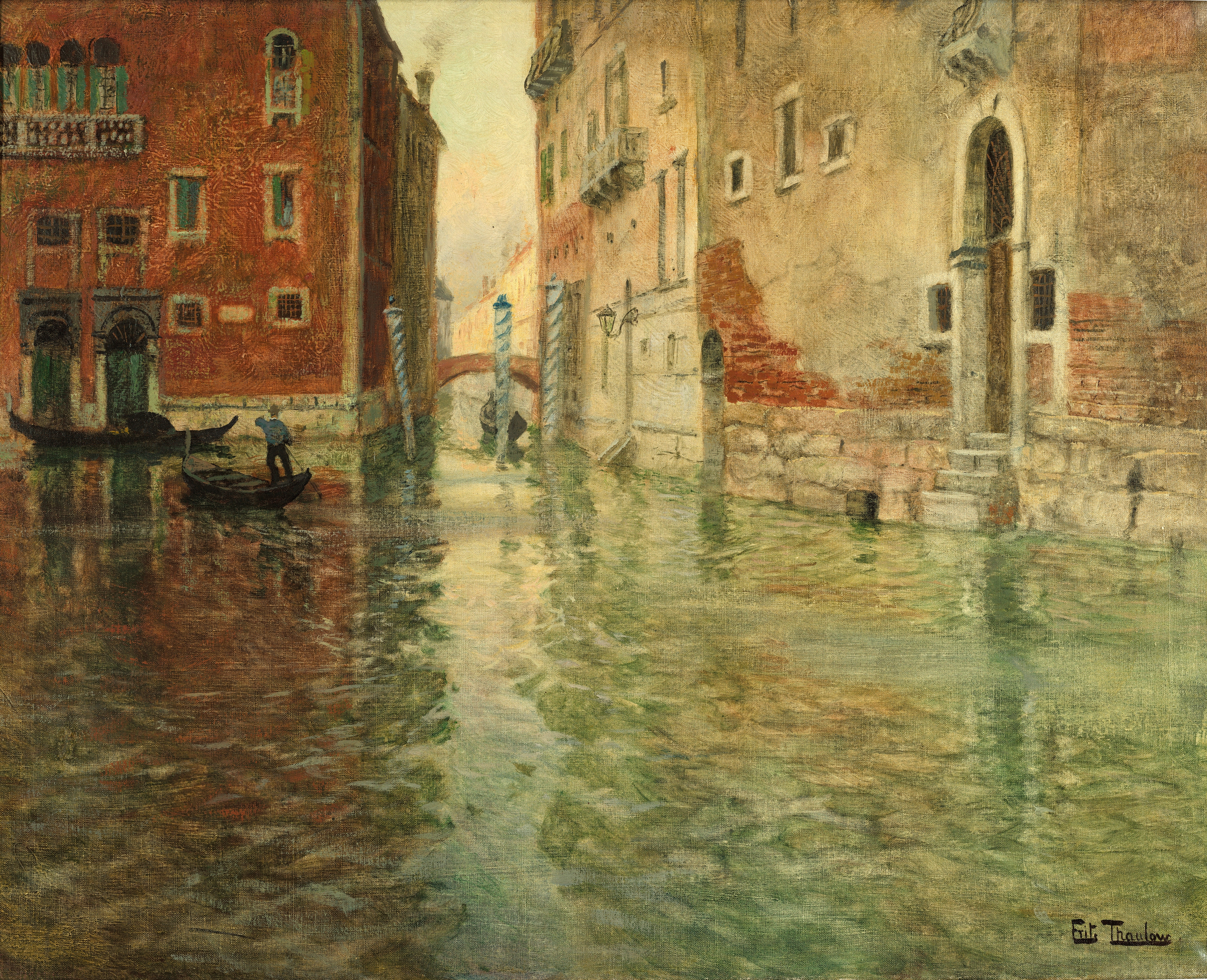
Area of Venice 1894

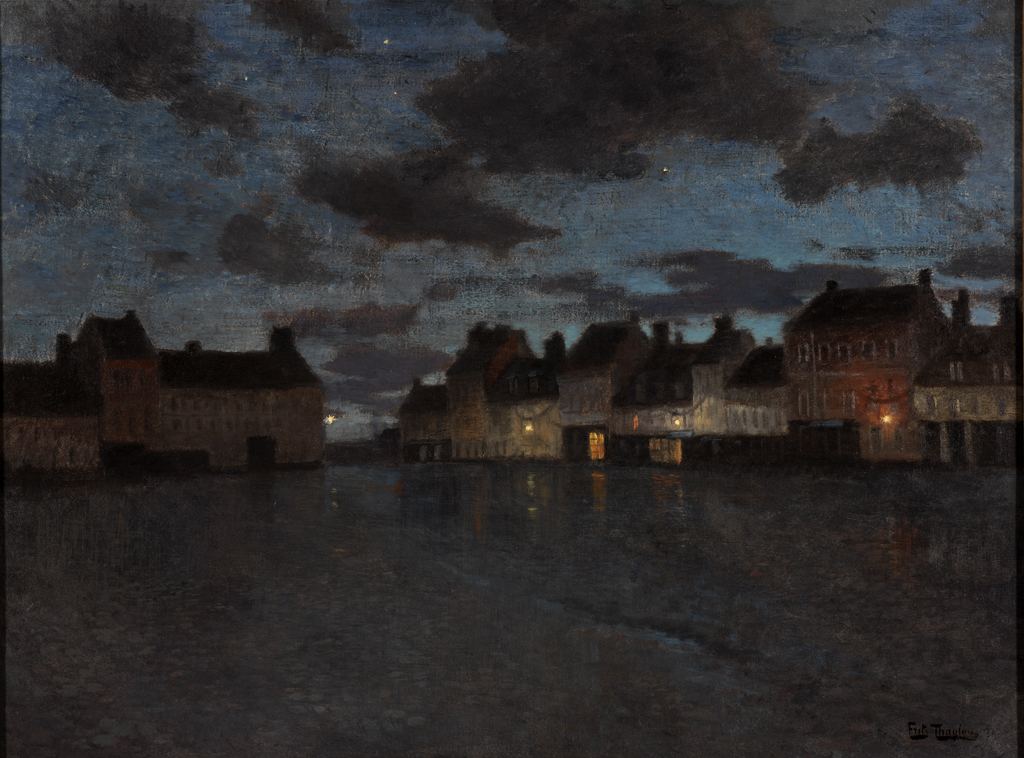
The Main Square, Montreuil (La Grande Place, Montreuil) 1894

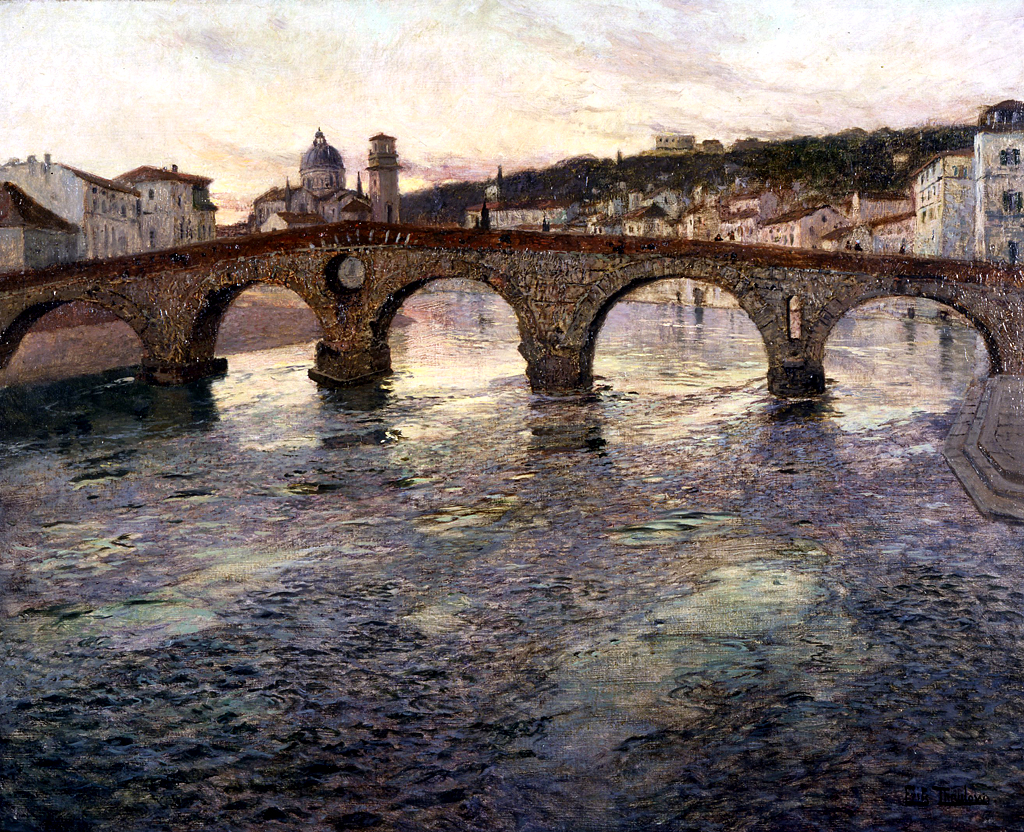
The Adige River at Verona 1894

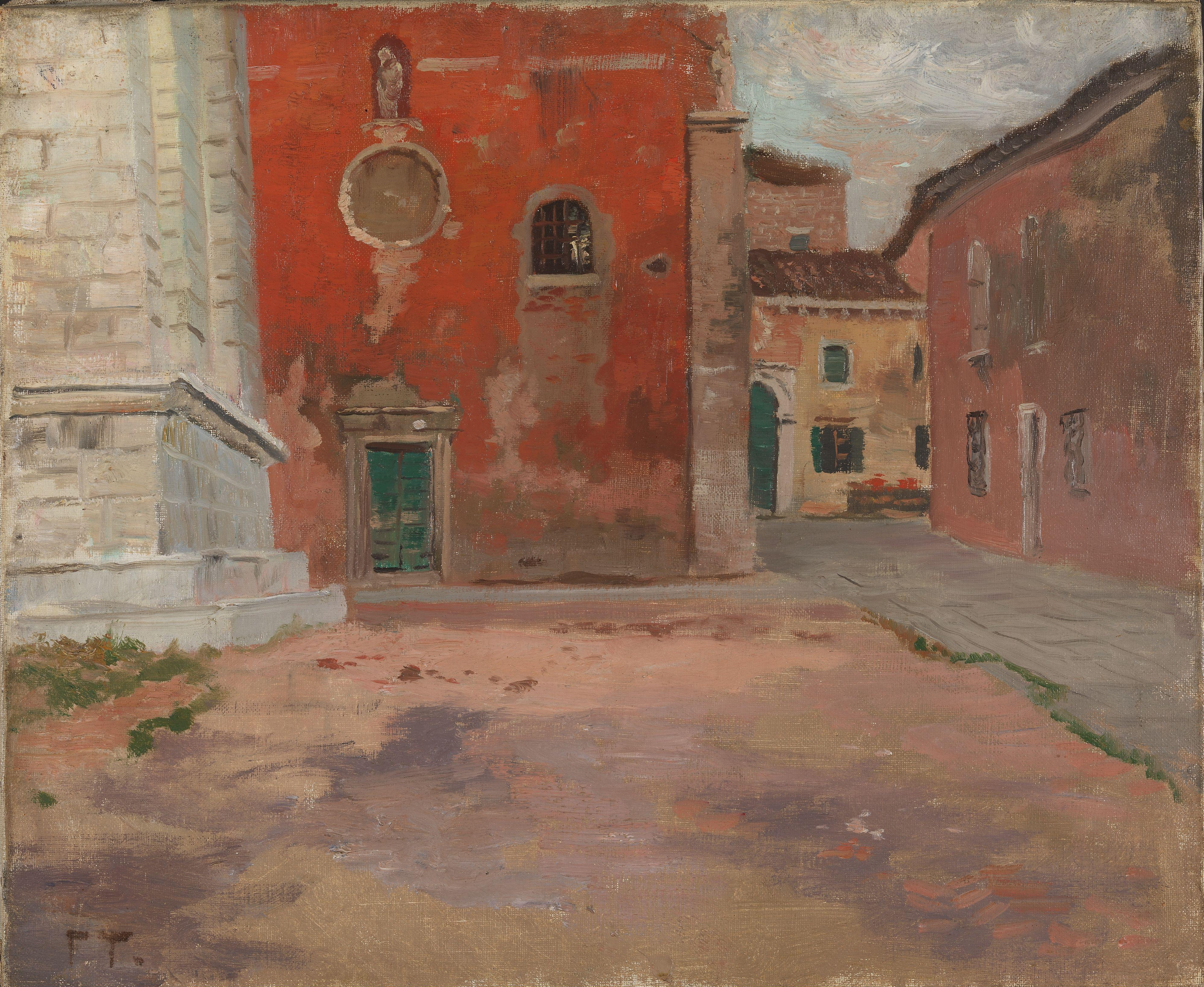
Red Church Wall in Venice 1894

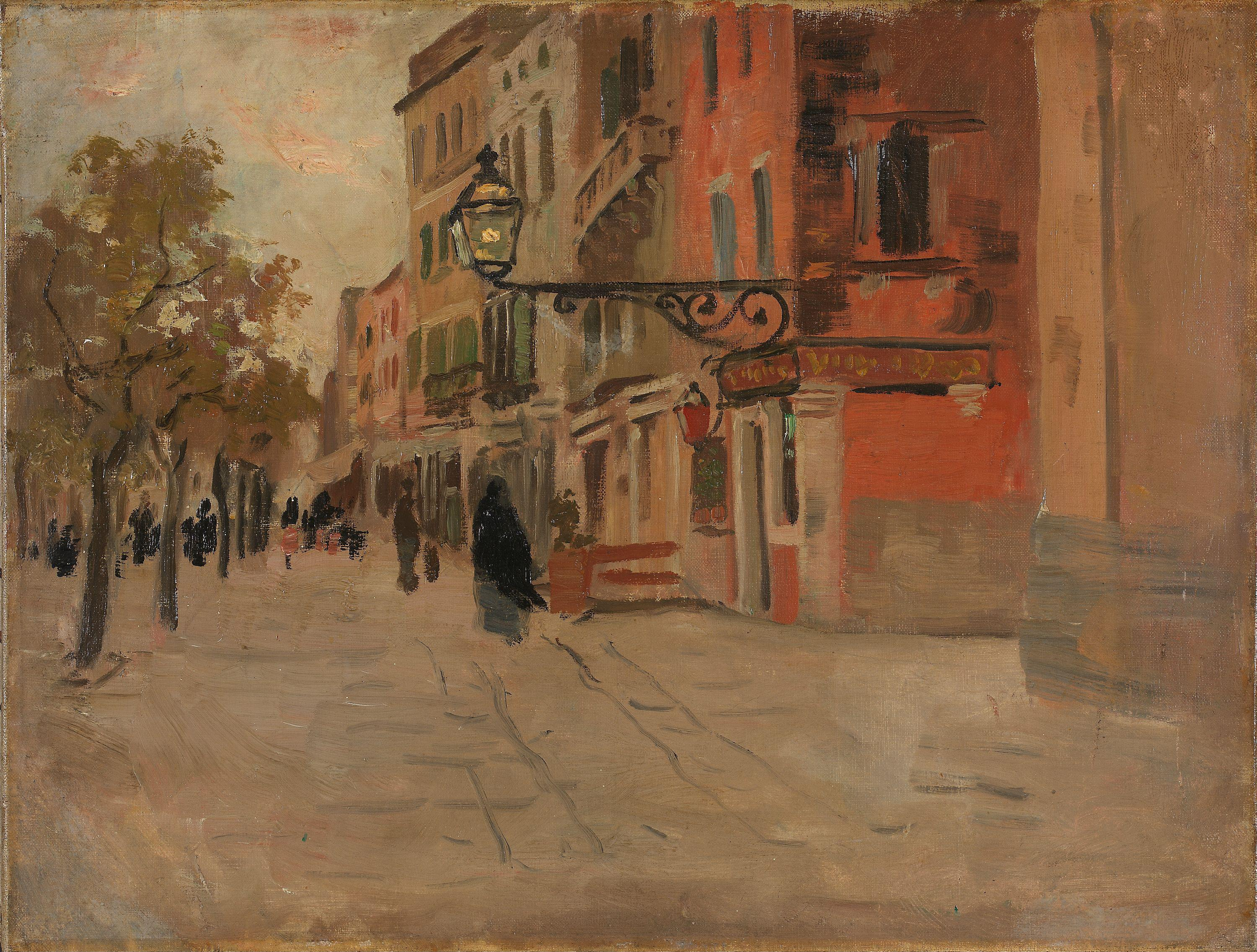
Street in Venice 1894

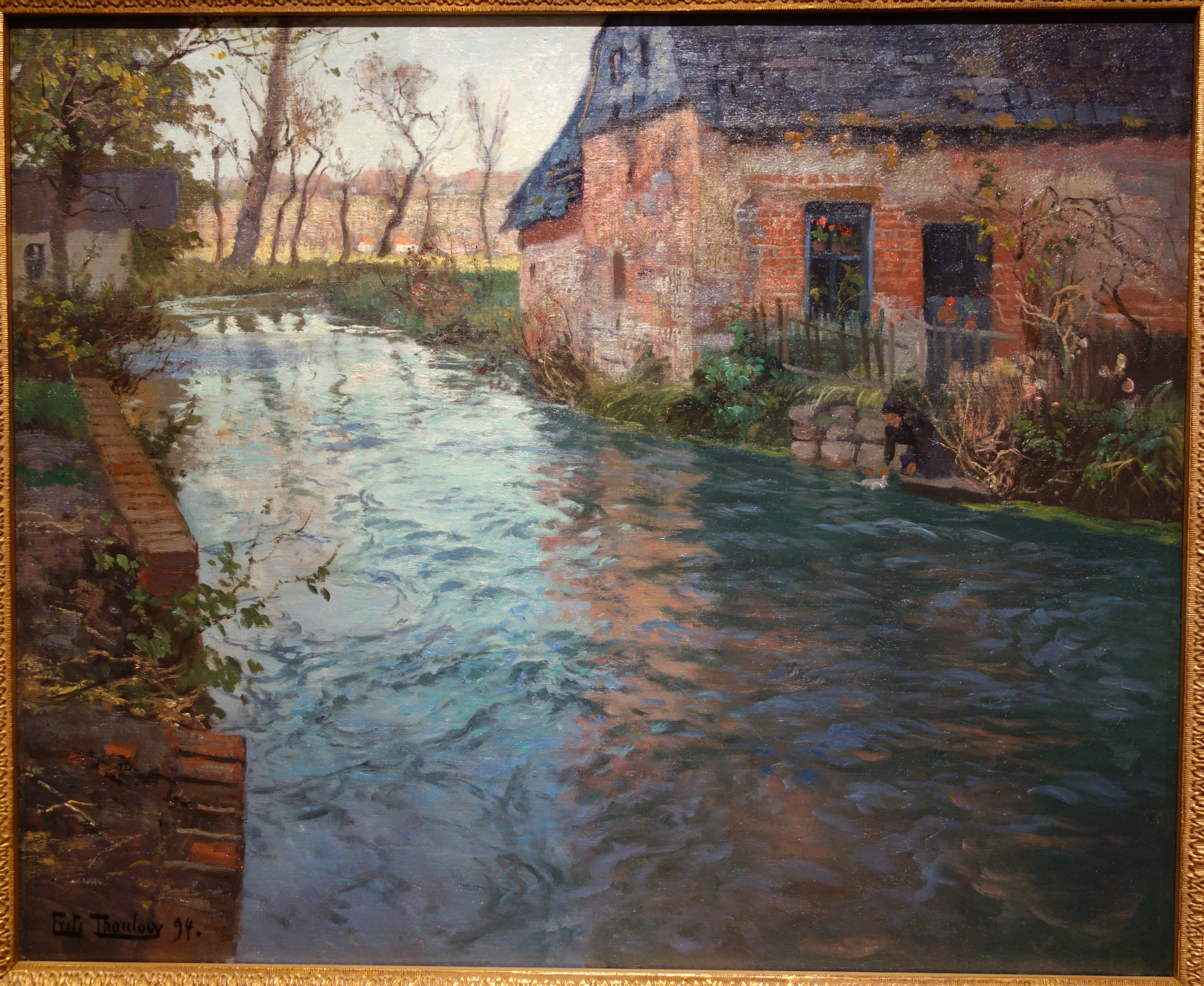
River in Normandy 1894

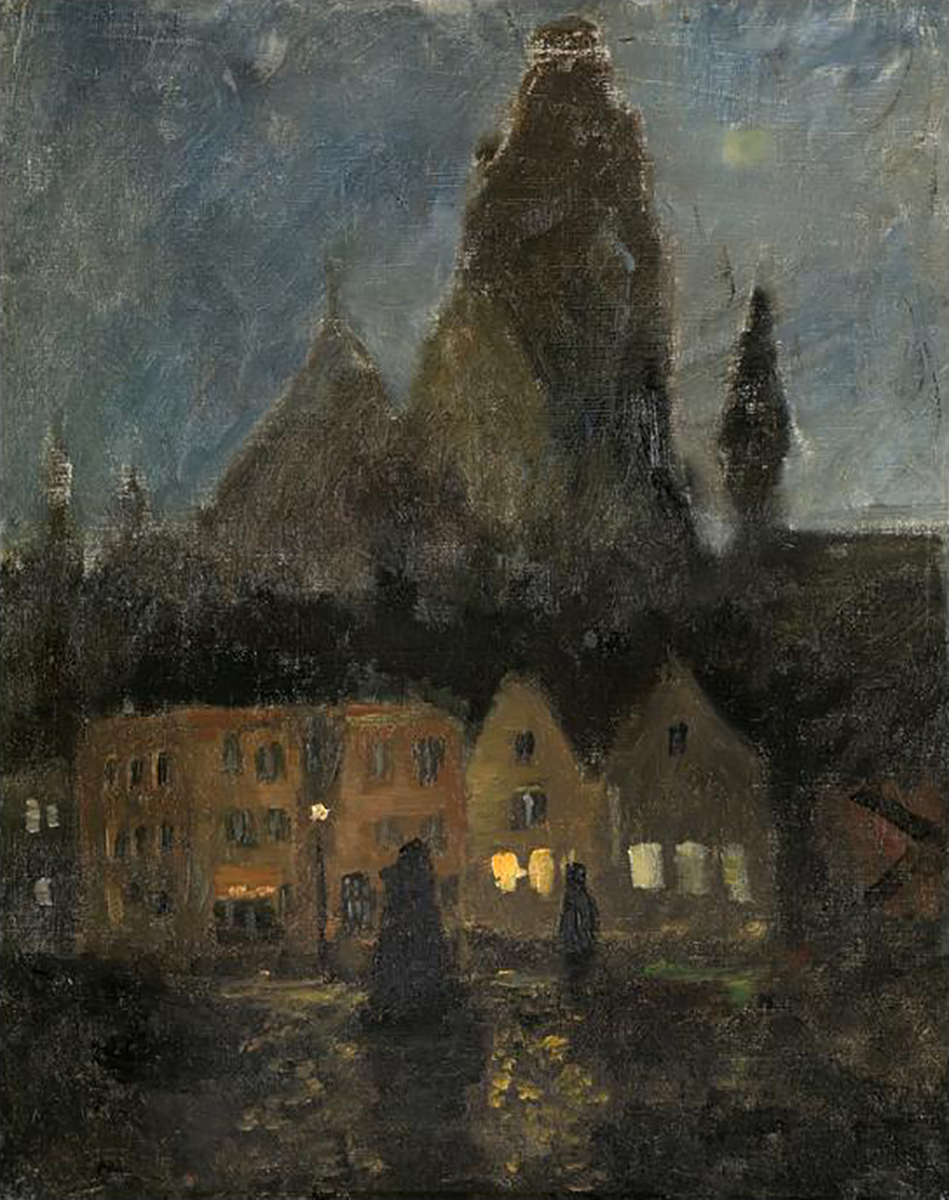
Kveldstemning, Dieppe 1894–1898

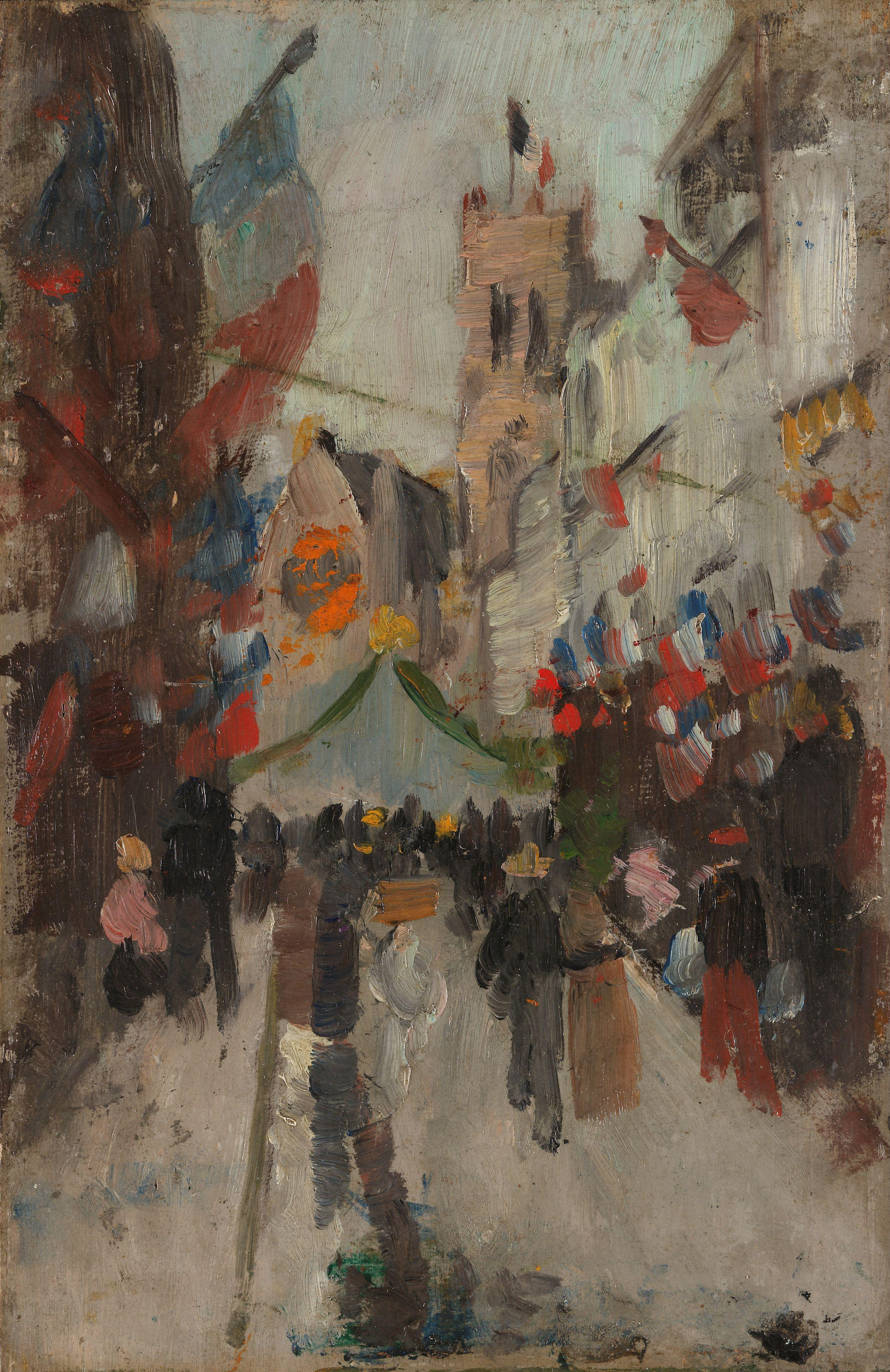
July 14th in Dieppe 1894–1898

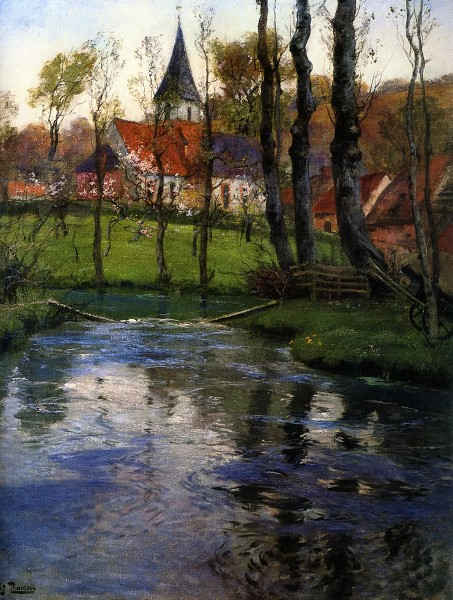
The Old Church by the River 1895

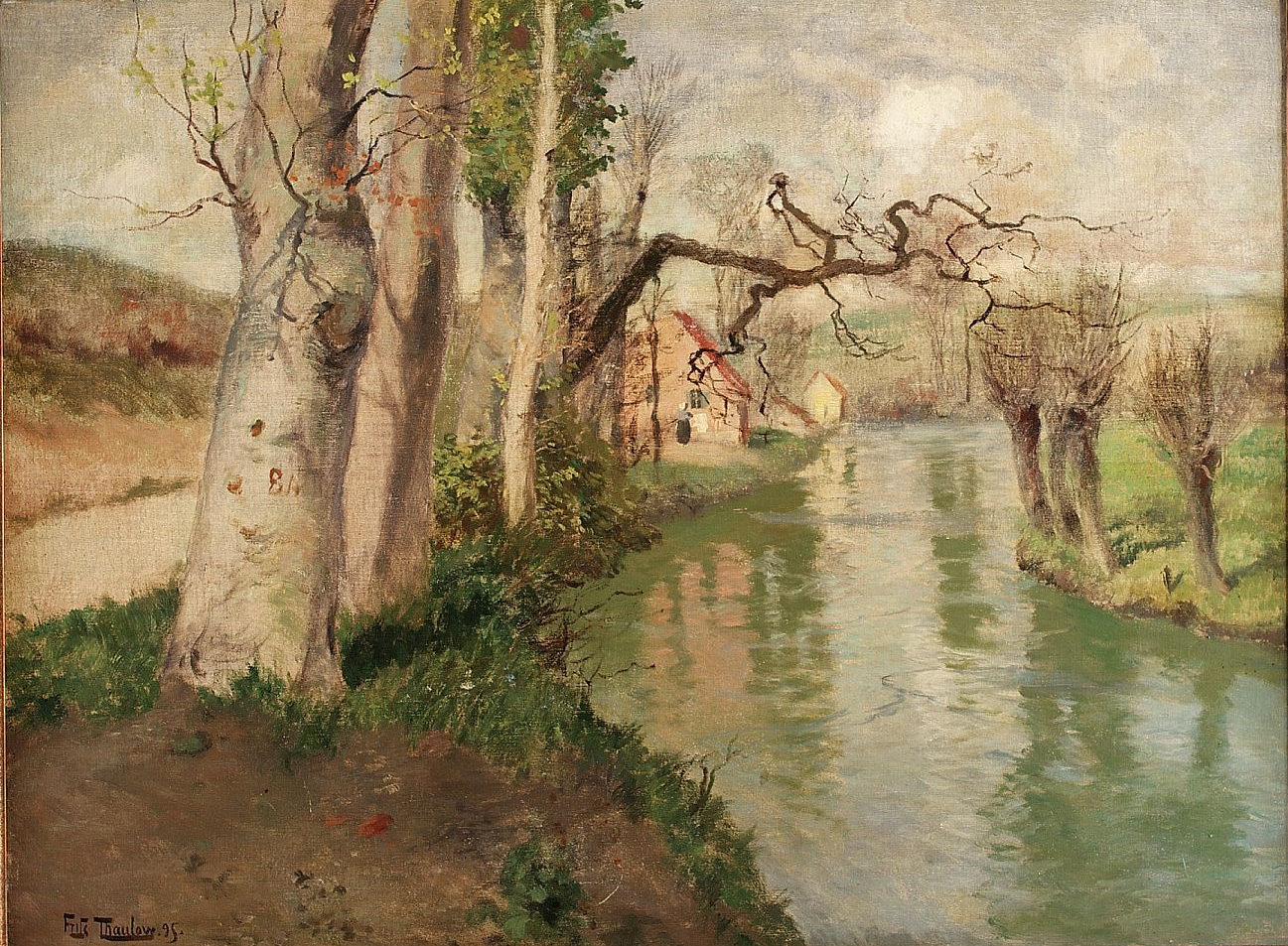
Fra Dieppe med elven Arques 1895

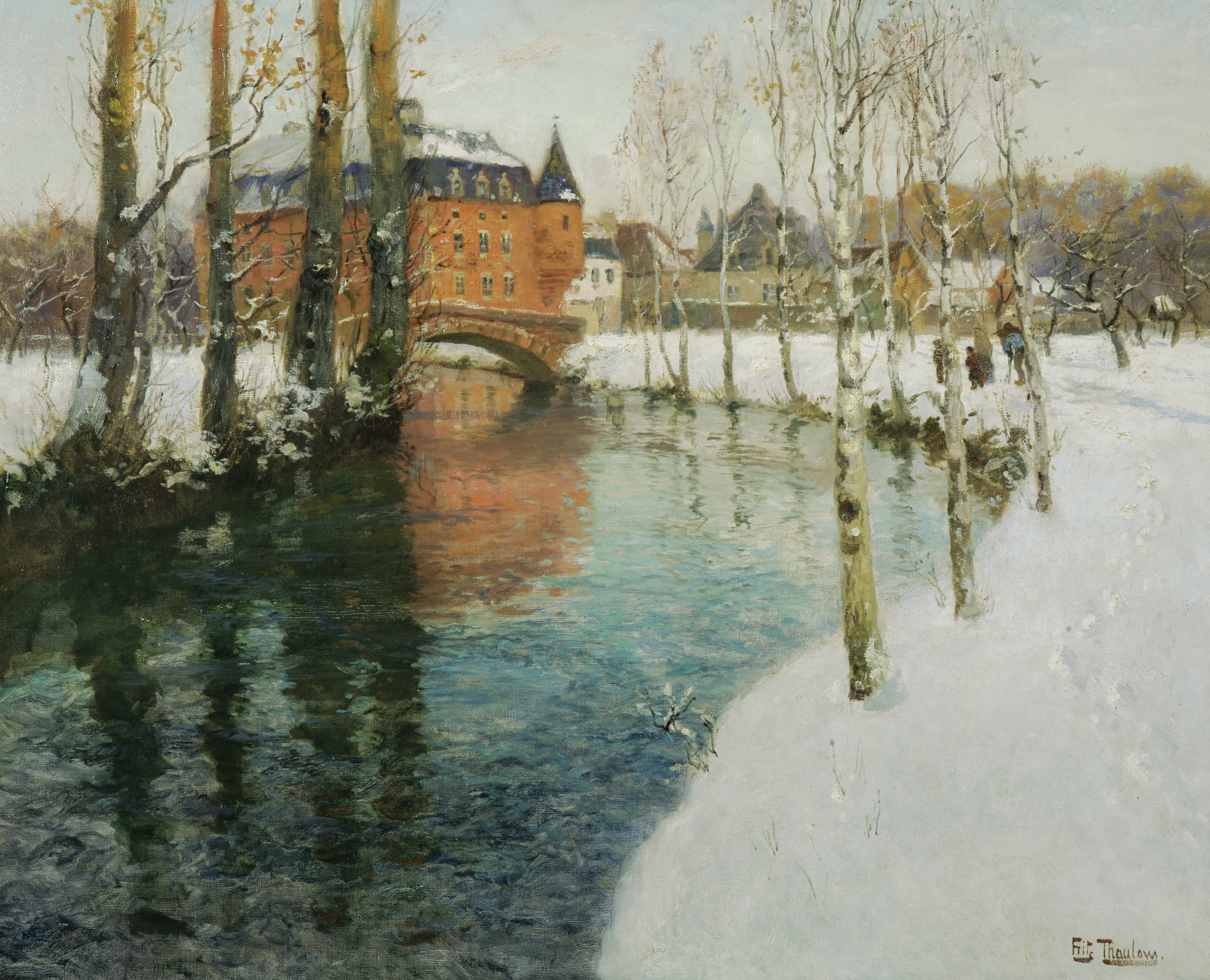
A Château in Normandy 1895

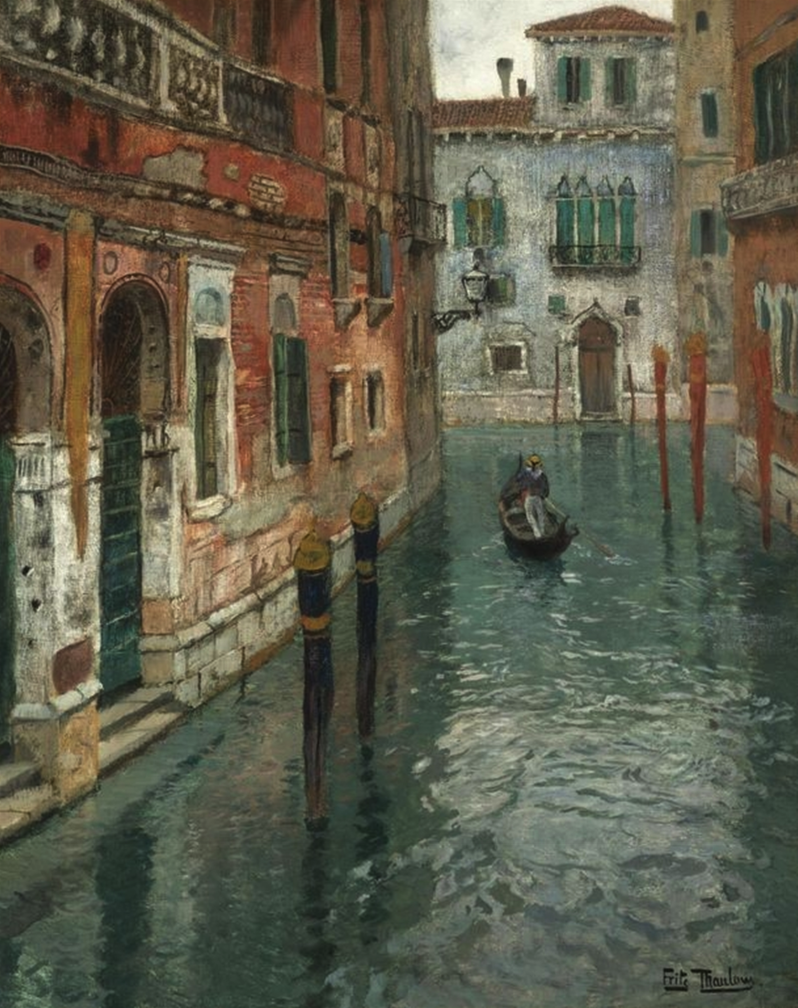
View of Venice 1895

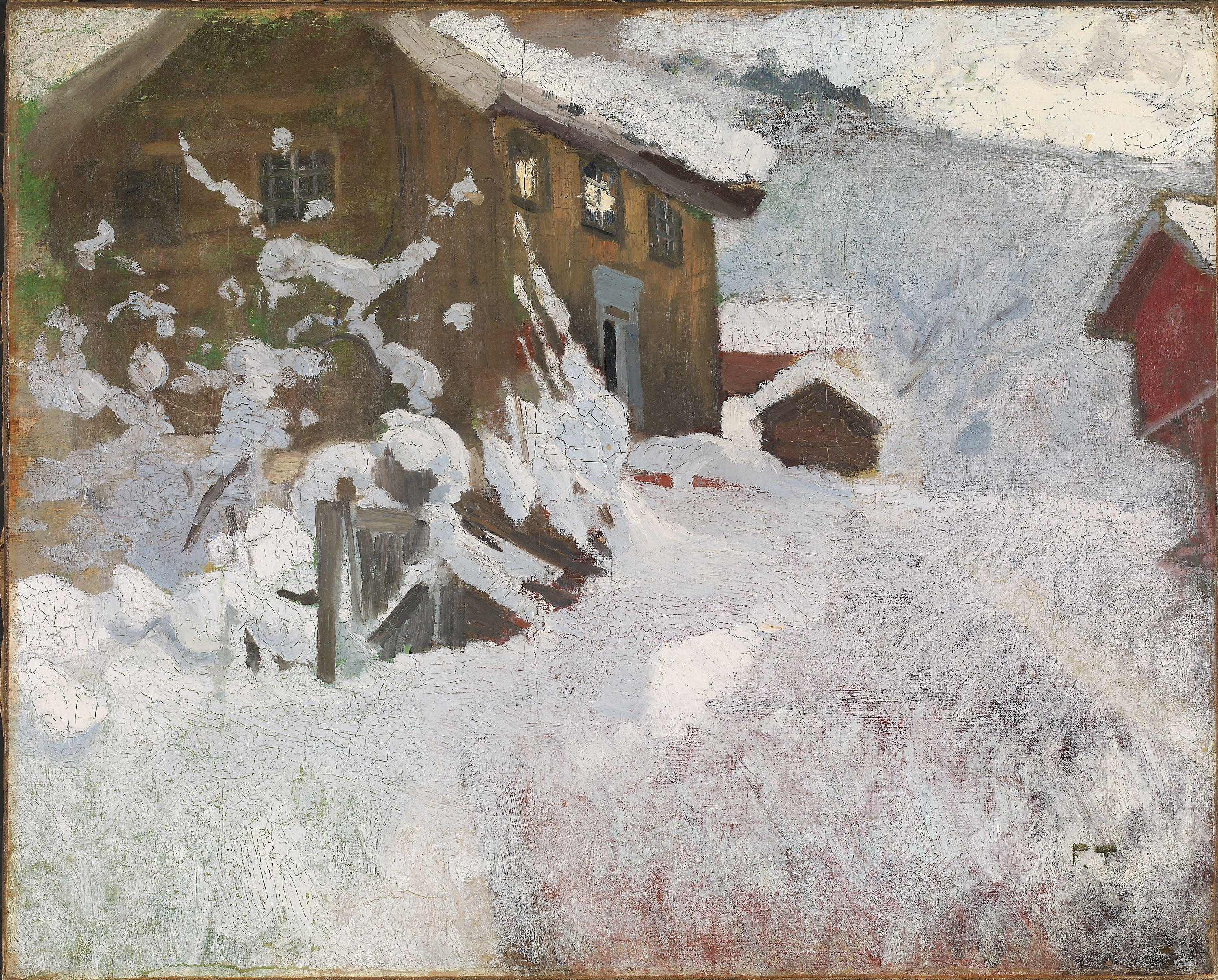
Norwegian Winter 1896

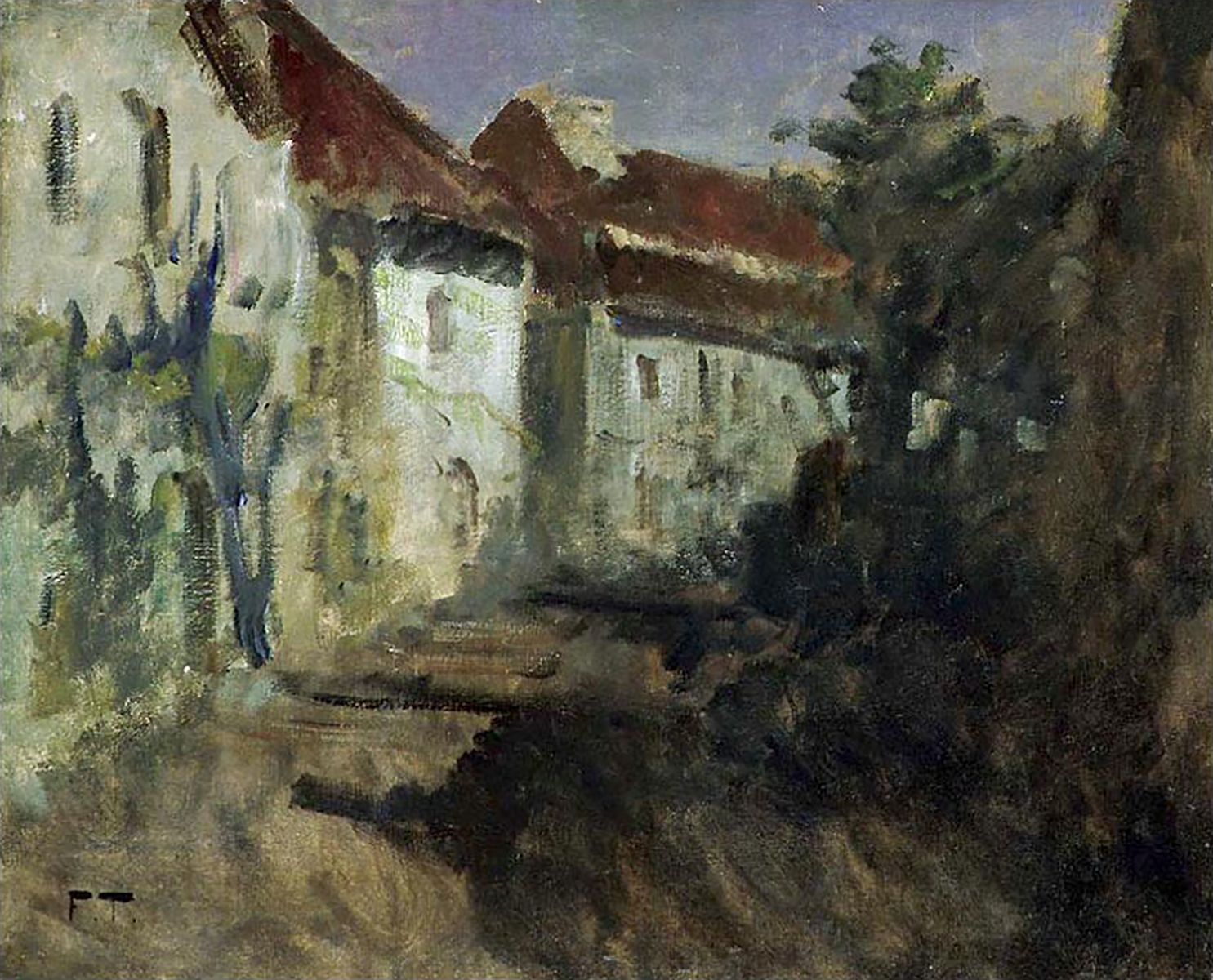
Måneskinn Dieppe 1896

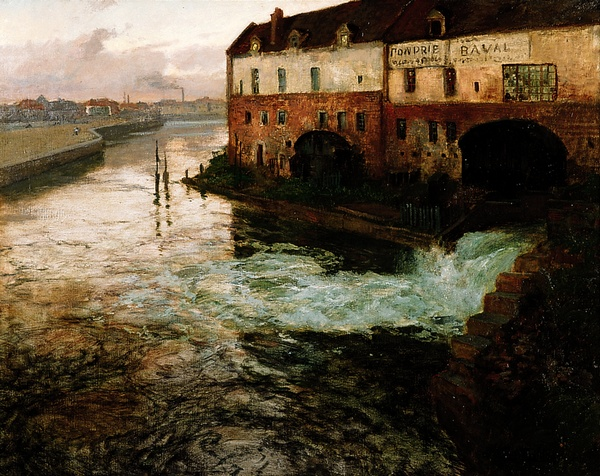
Vieille fabrique sur la Somme 1896–1897

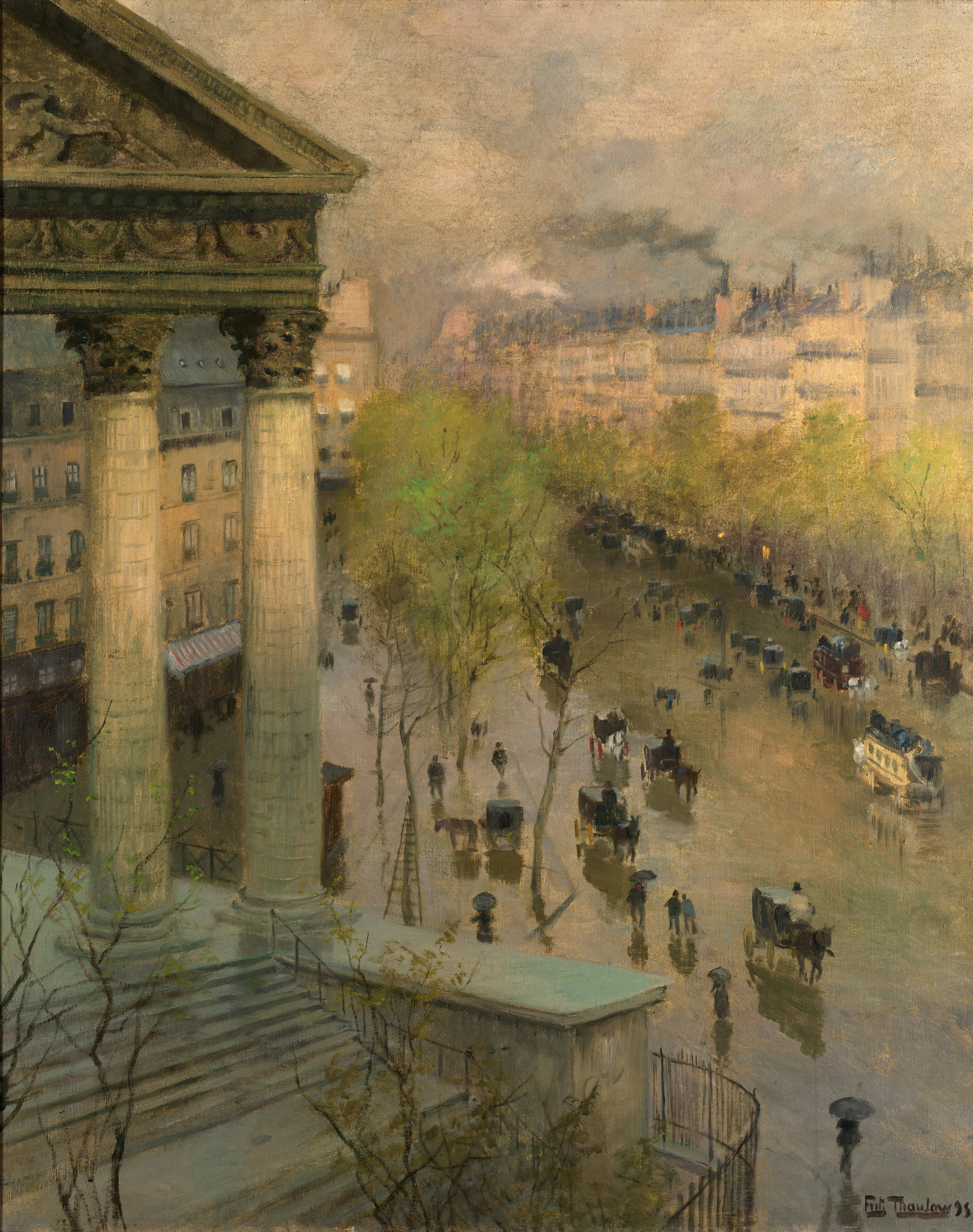
Boulevard de la Madeleine à Paris 1896–1897

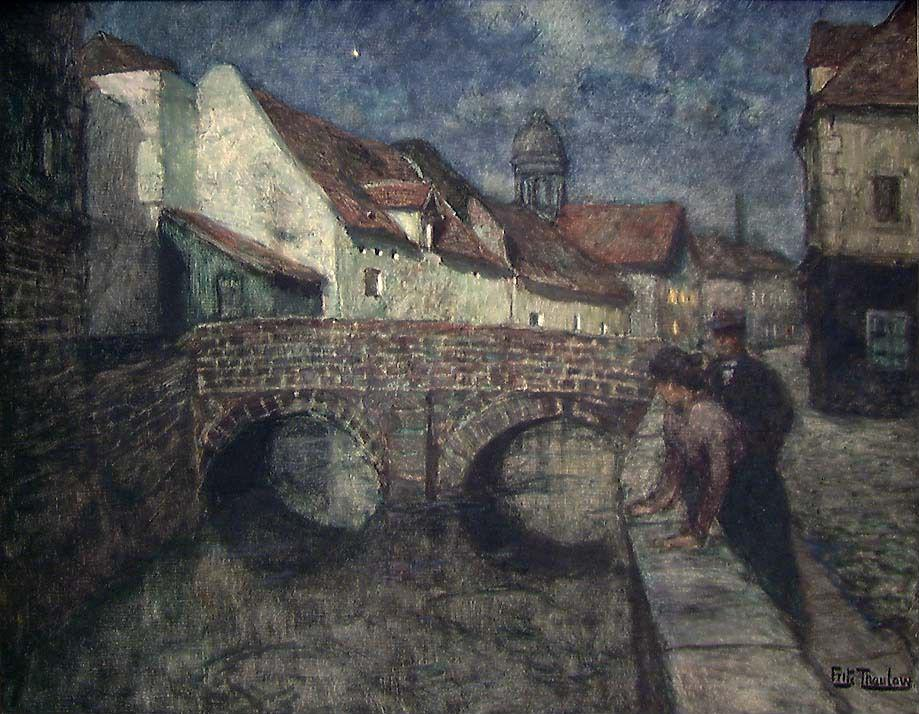
Midnight in Amiens 1897

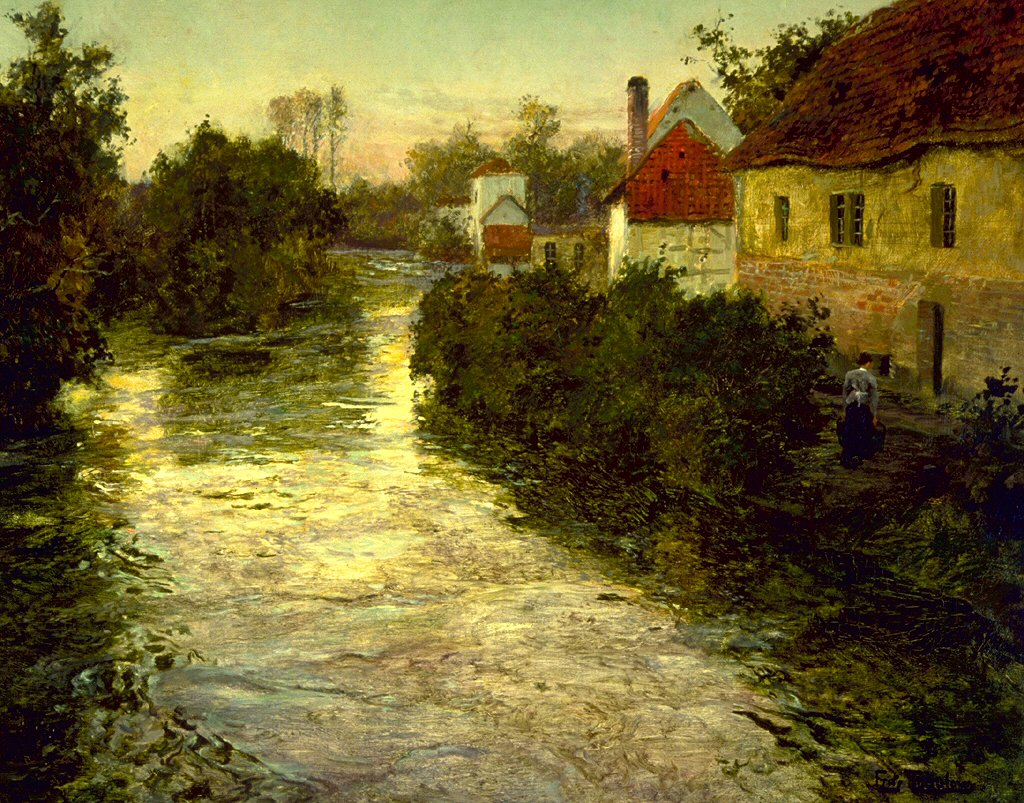
Village on the Bank of a Stream 1897

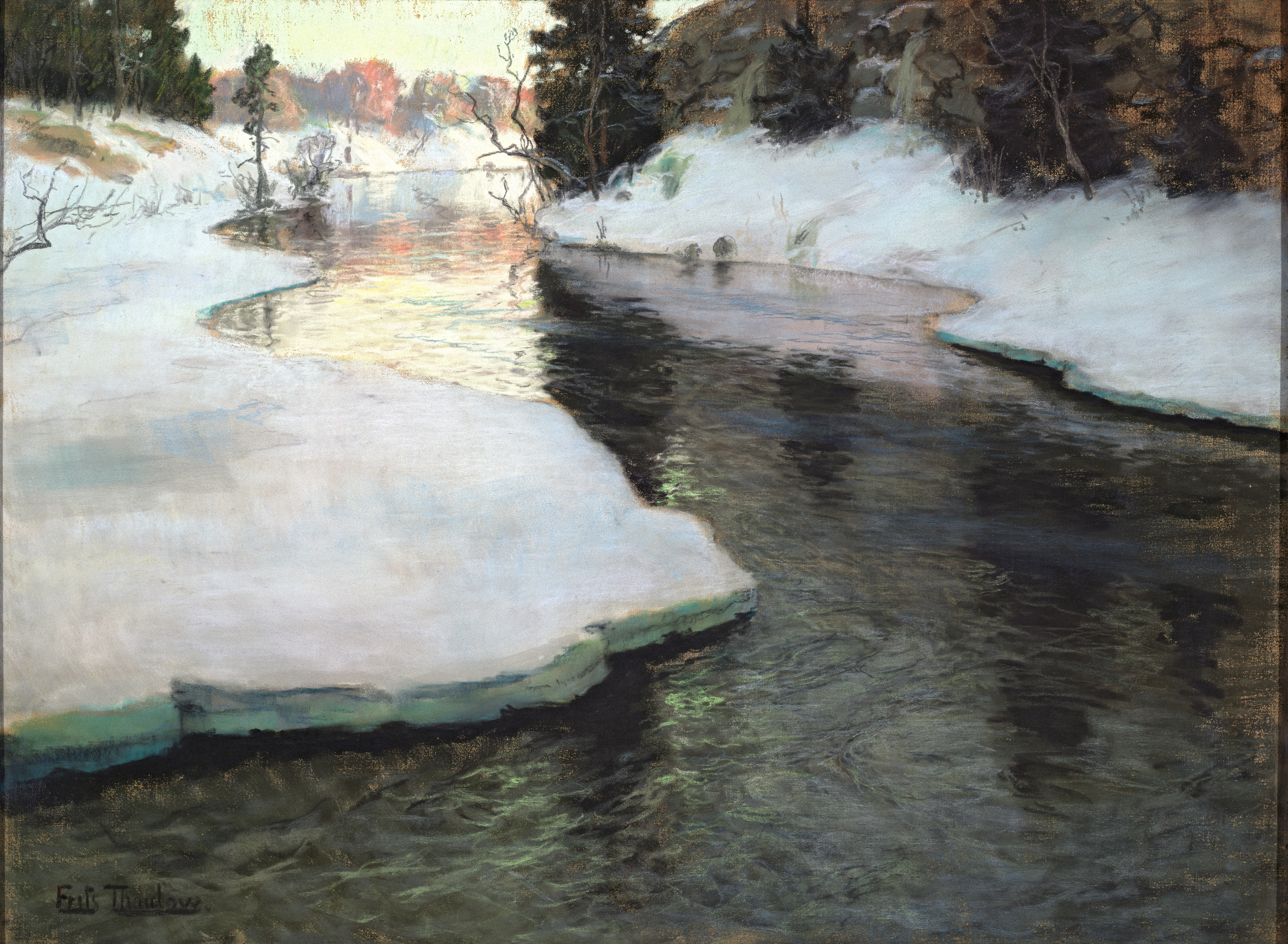
Mountain stream, Winter 1898

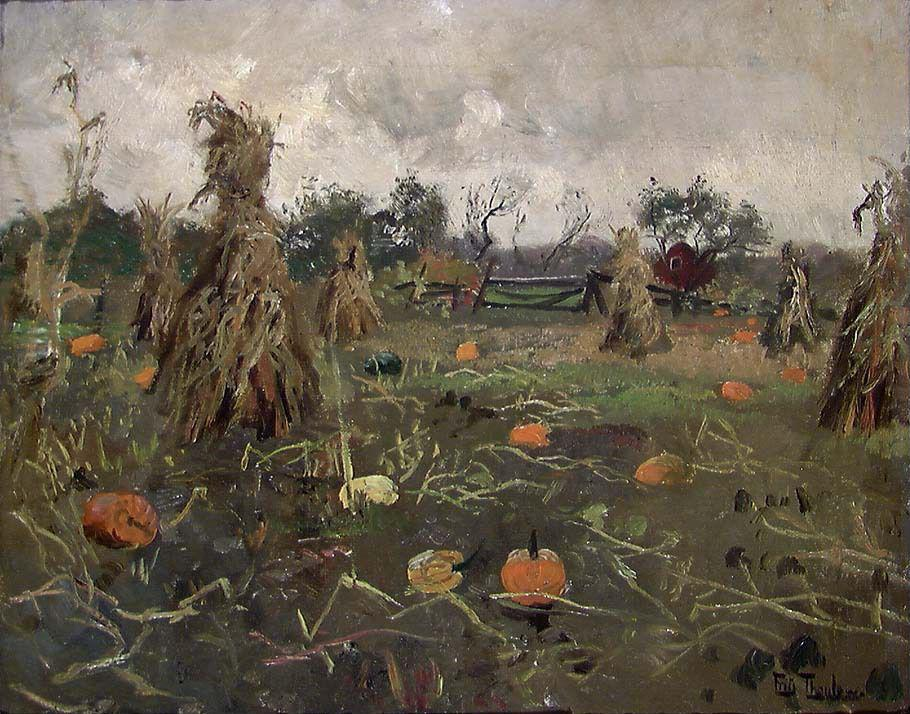
Field of Melons near Pittsburgh, USA 1898

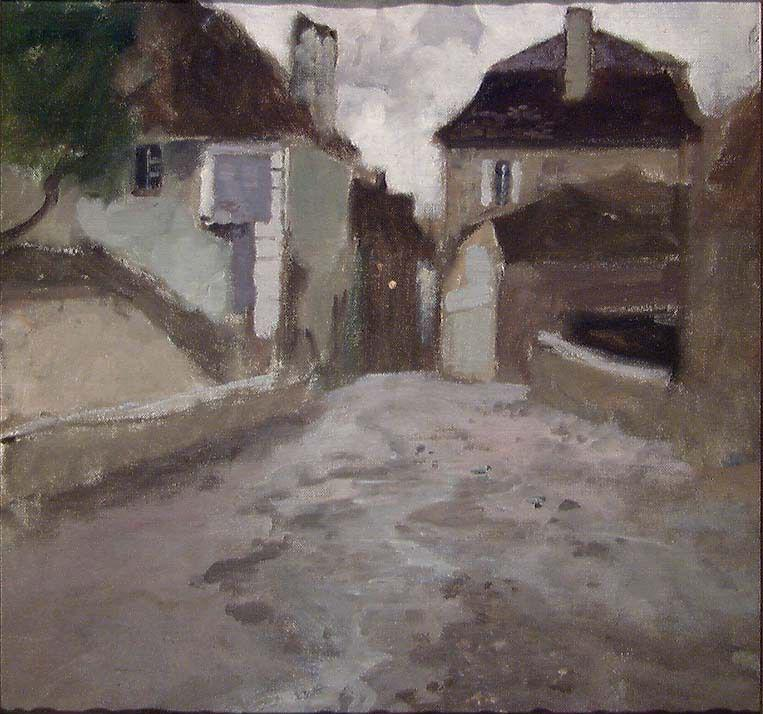
Village Street in overcast Weather 1898

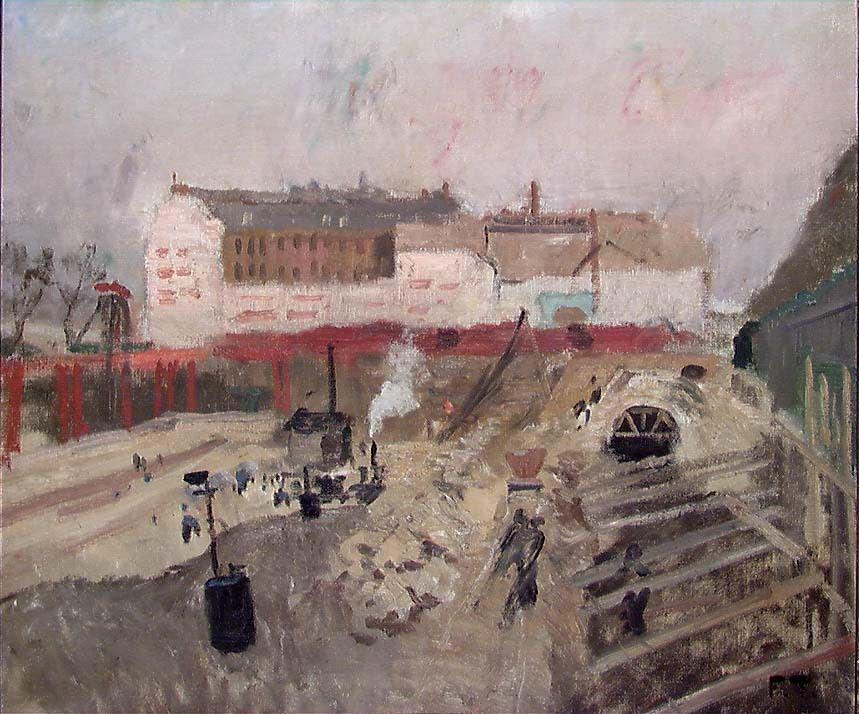
Gare d'Orleans in Paris under Construction 1898

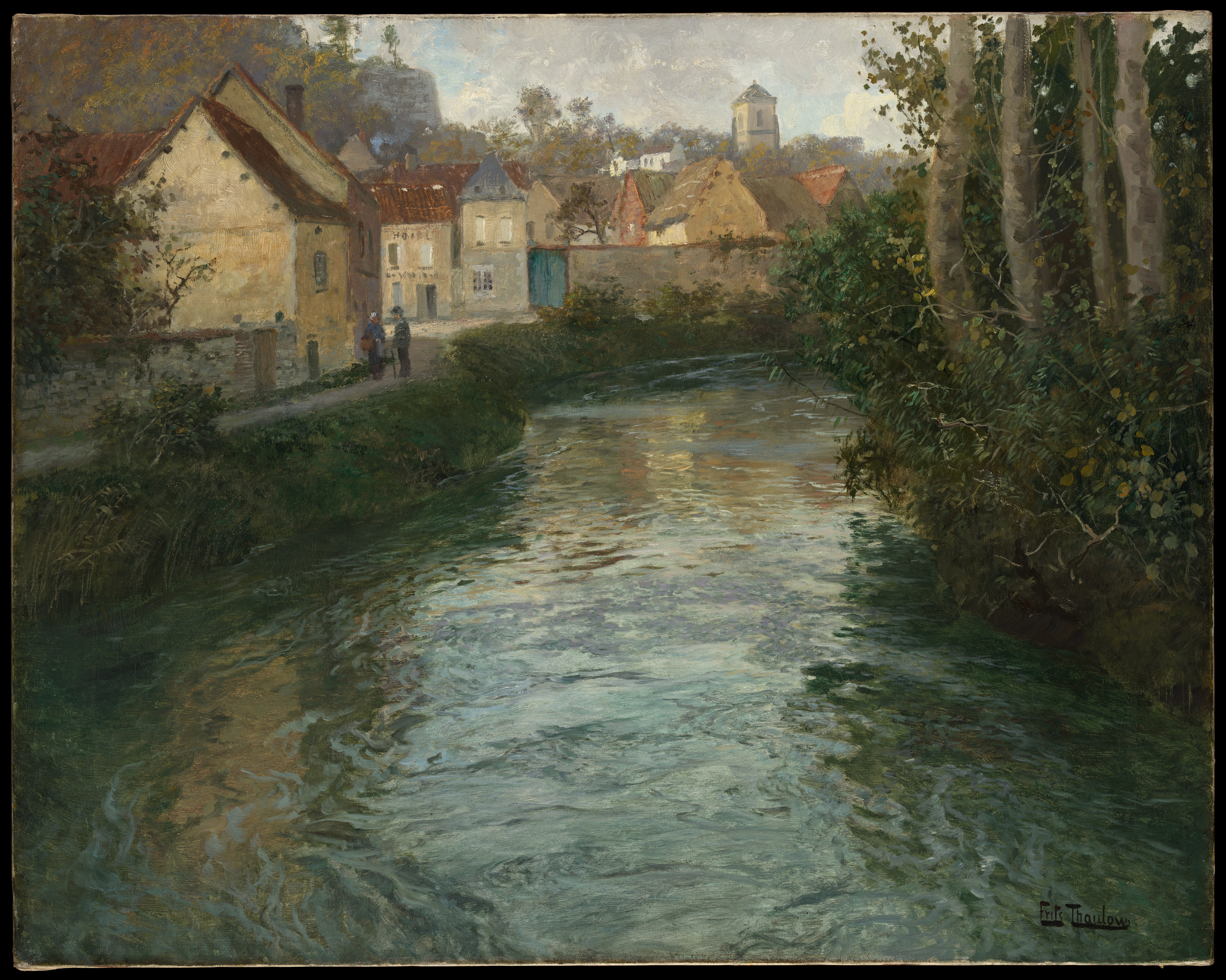
Picquigny 1899

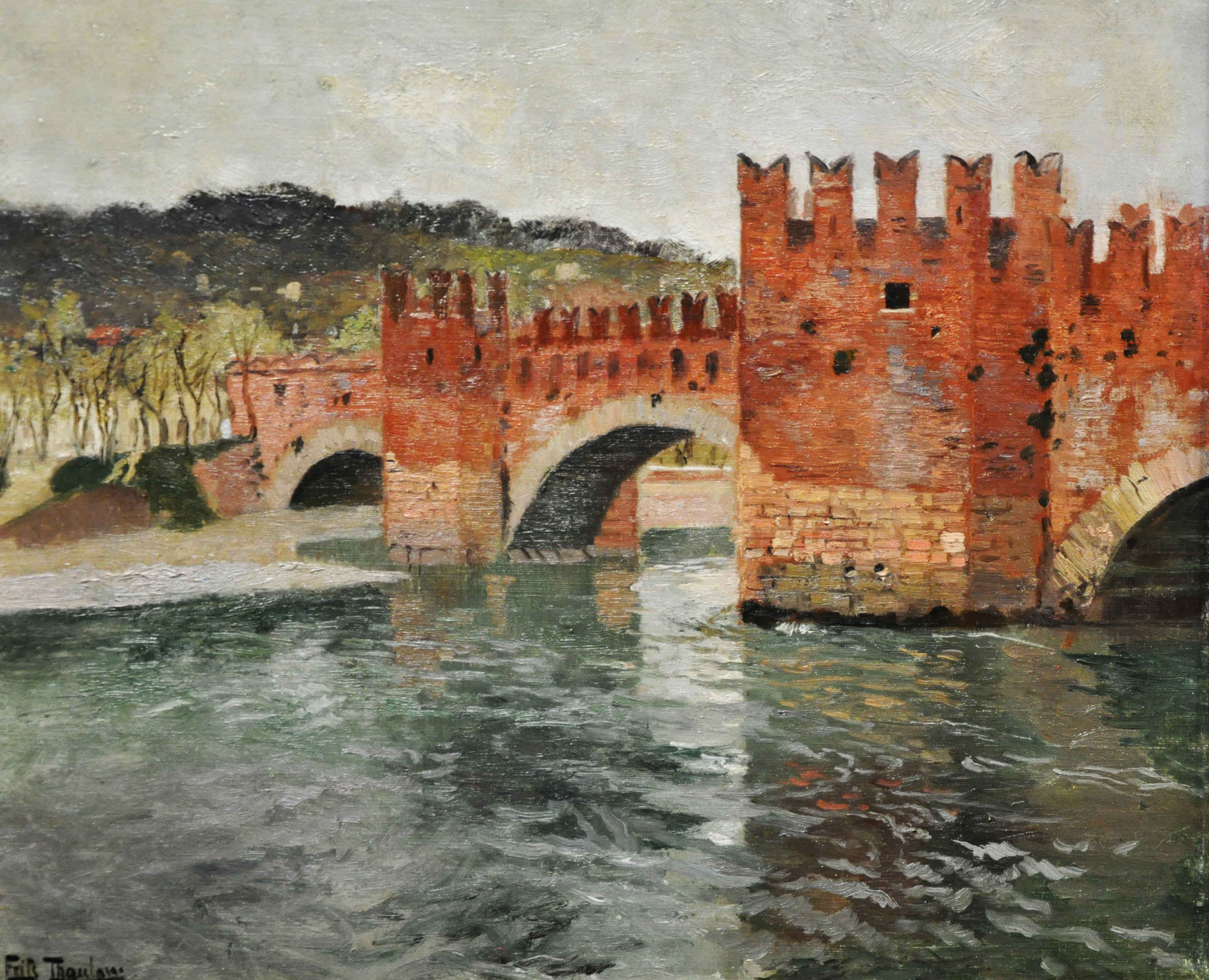
Ponte Scaligero (Verona) 1899

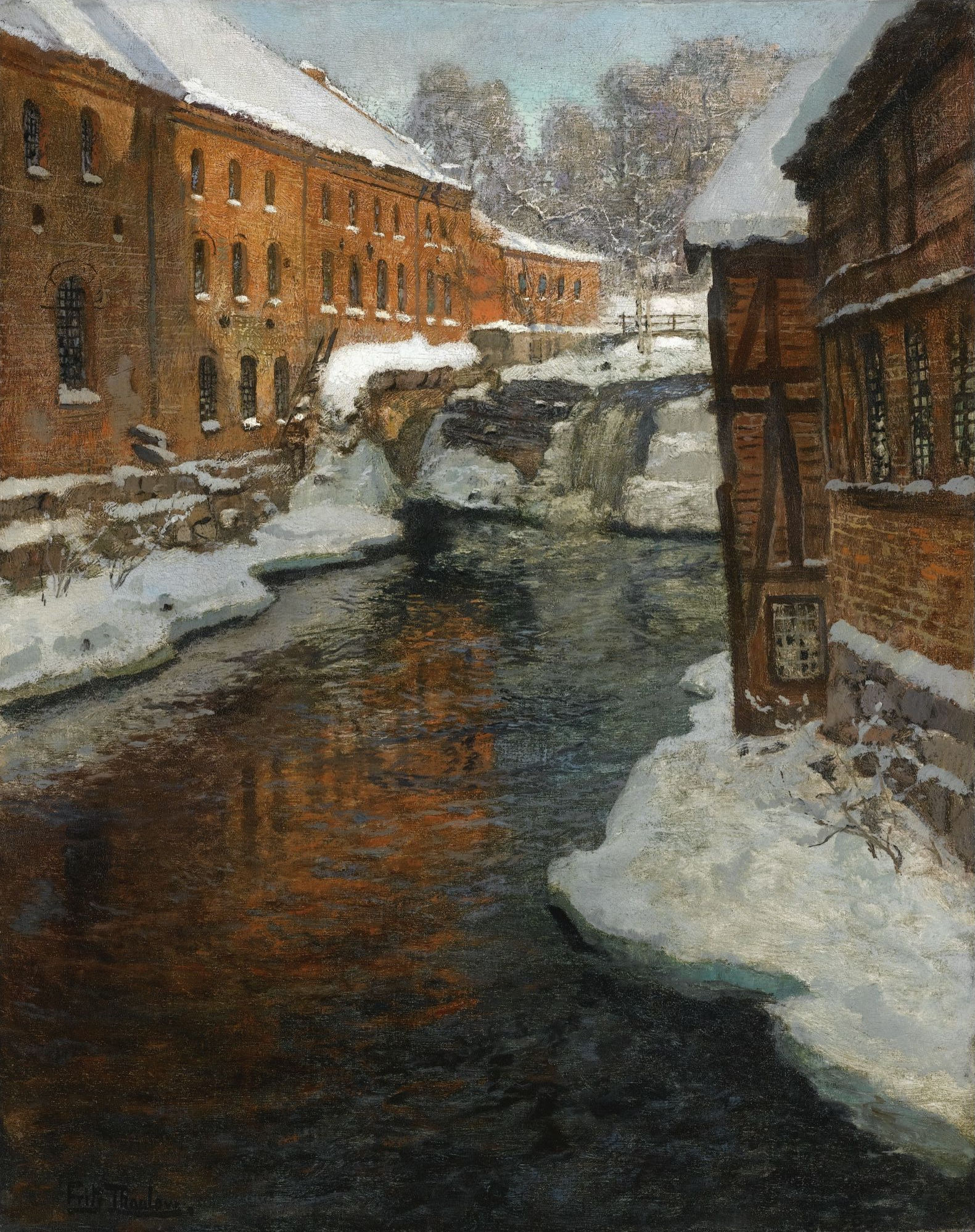
Fra Akerselven 1897–1901

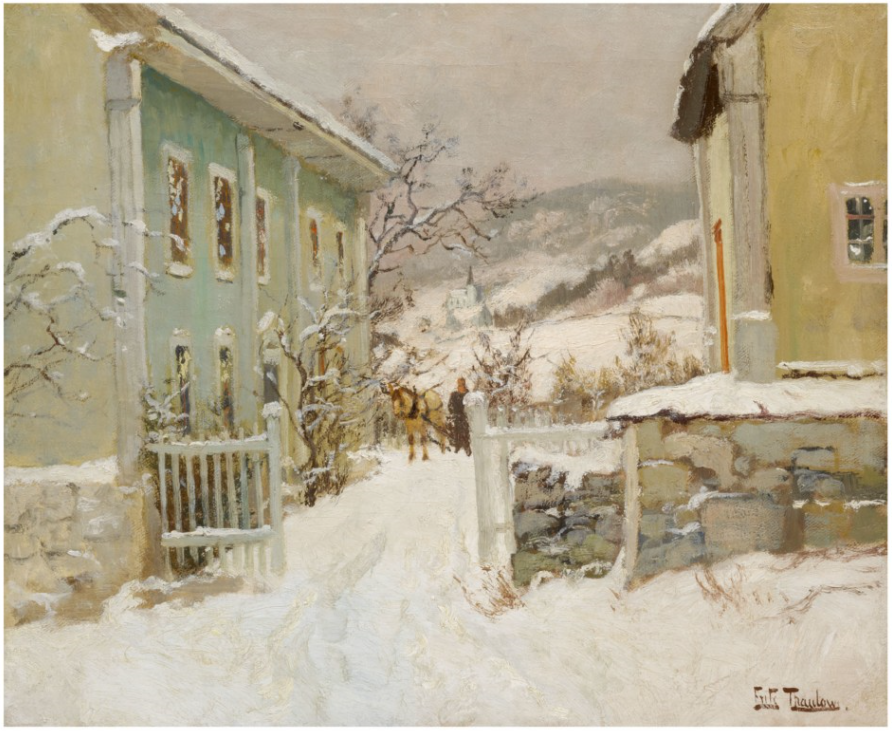
Clergy House in Norway 1900

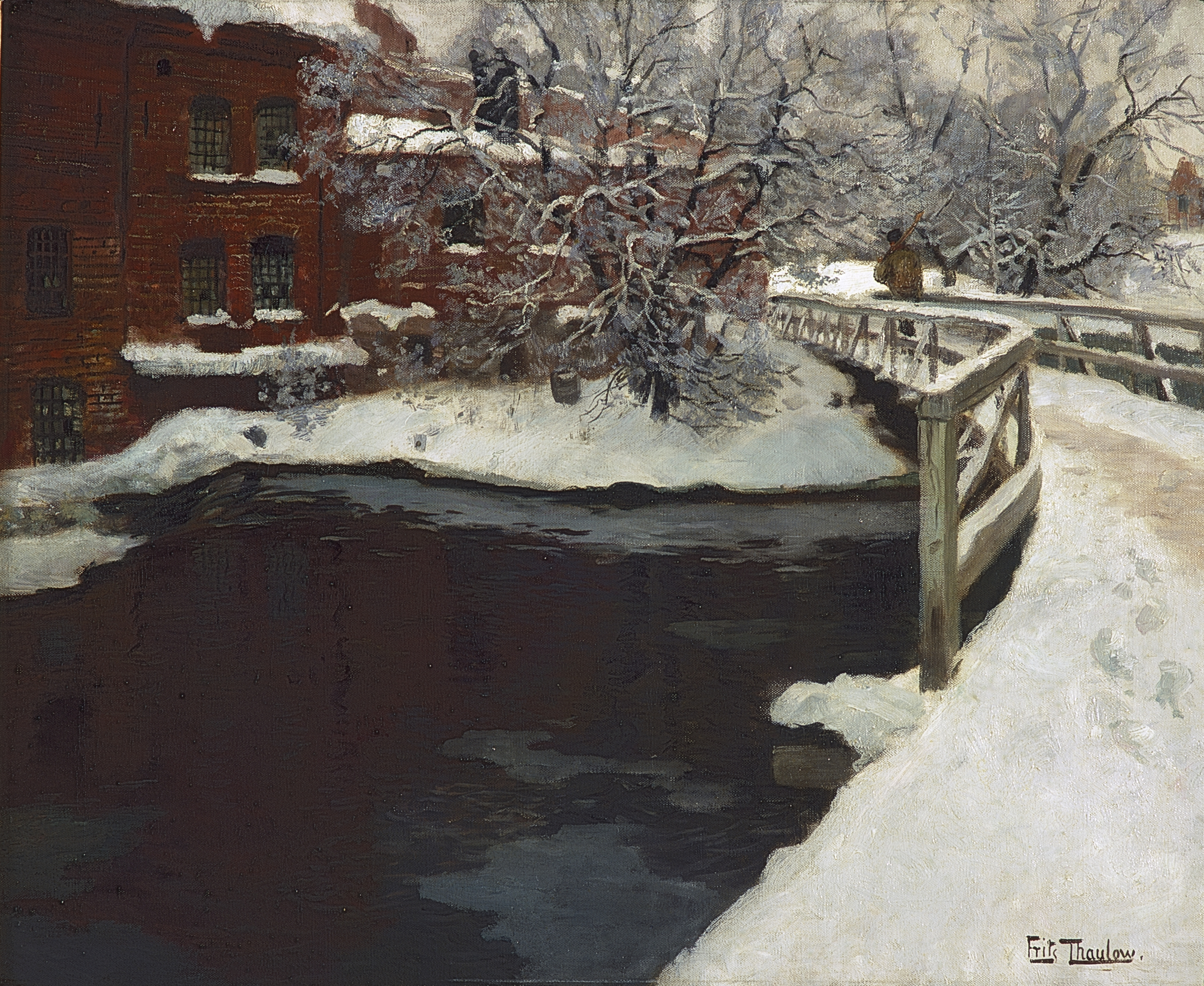
Treschow's Bridge 1901

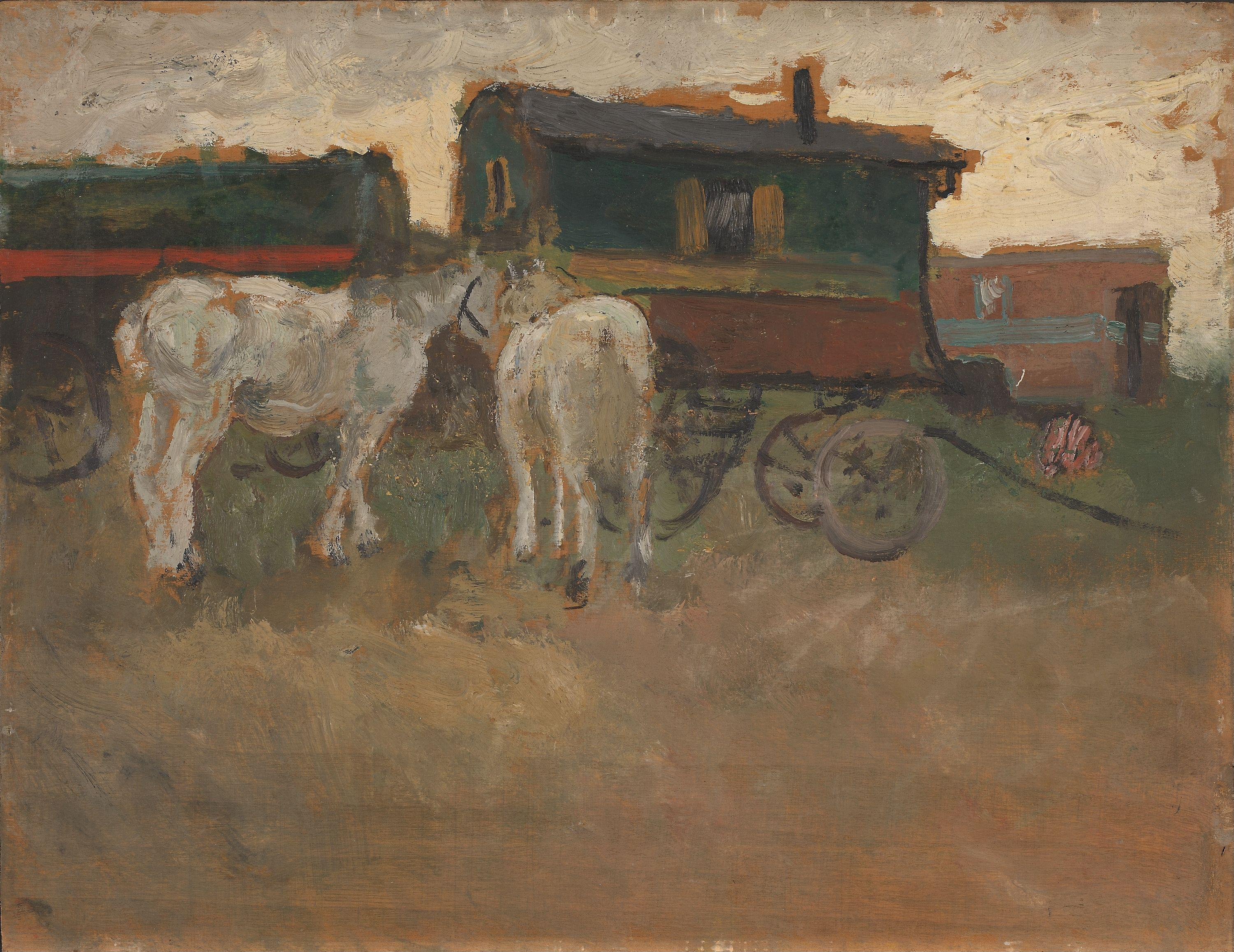
From Brittany 1901

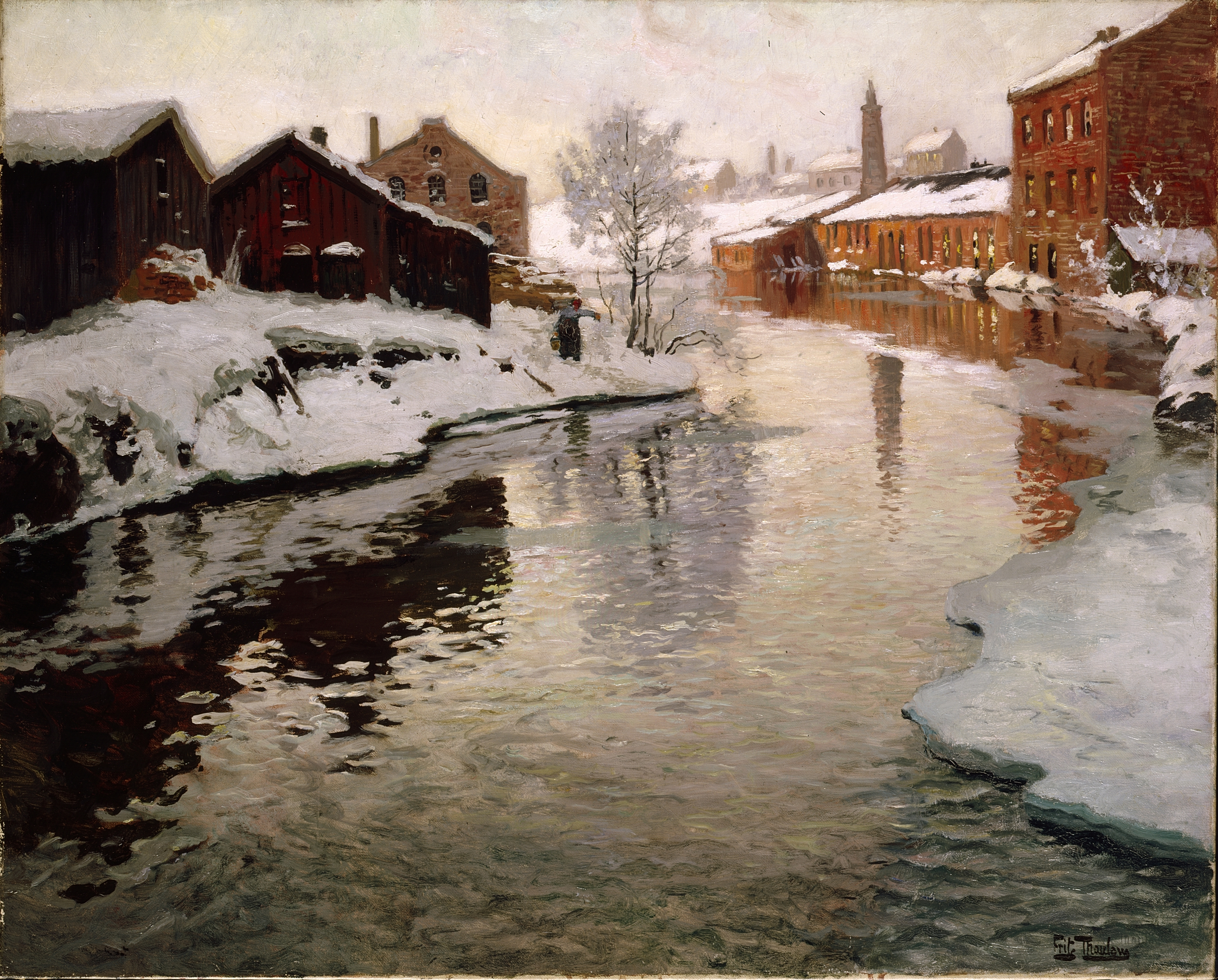
Den gamle fabrikk 1901

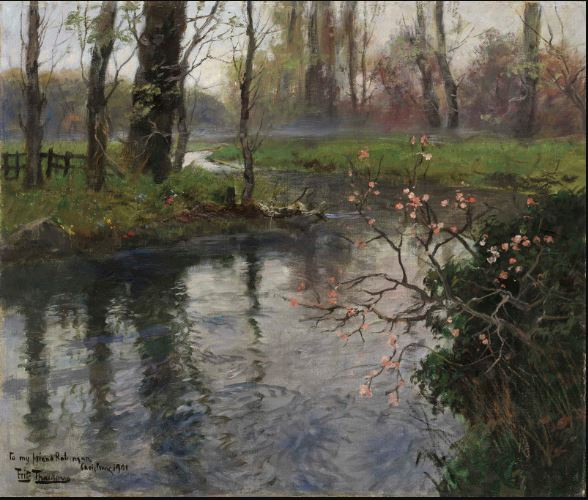
A Stream in Springtime 1901

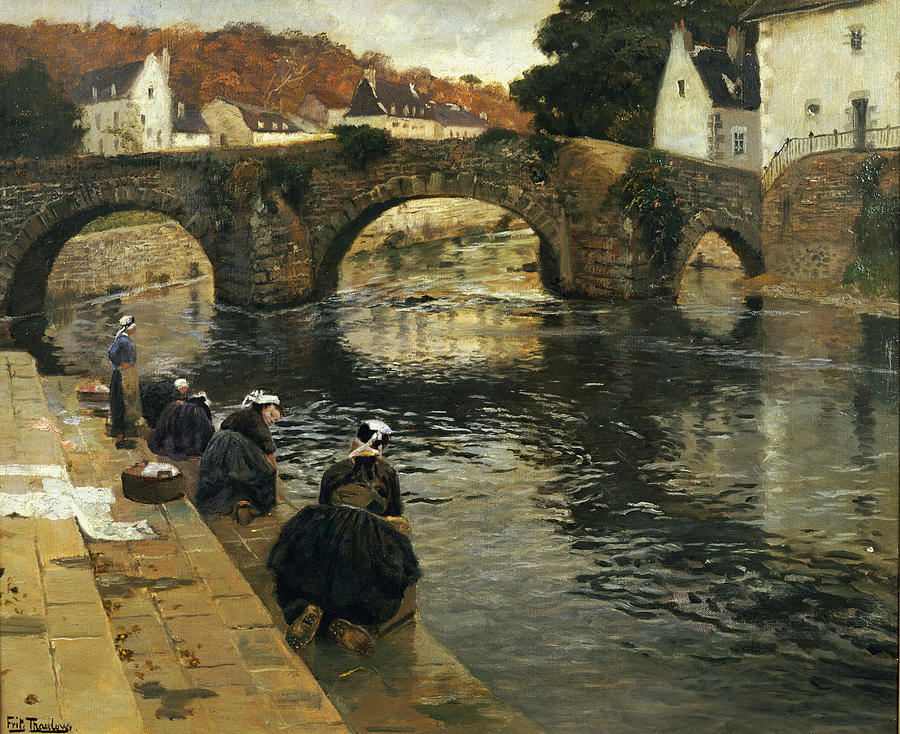
Washerwomen at Quimperle 1902

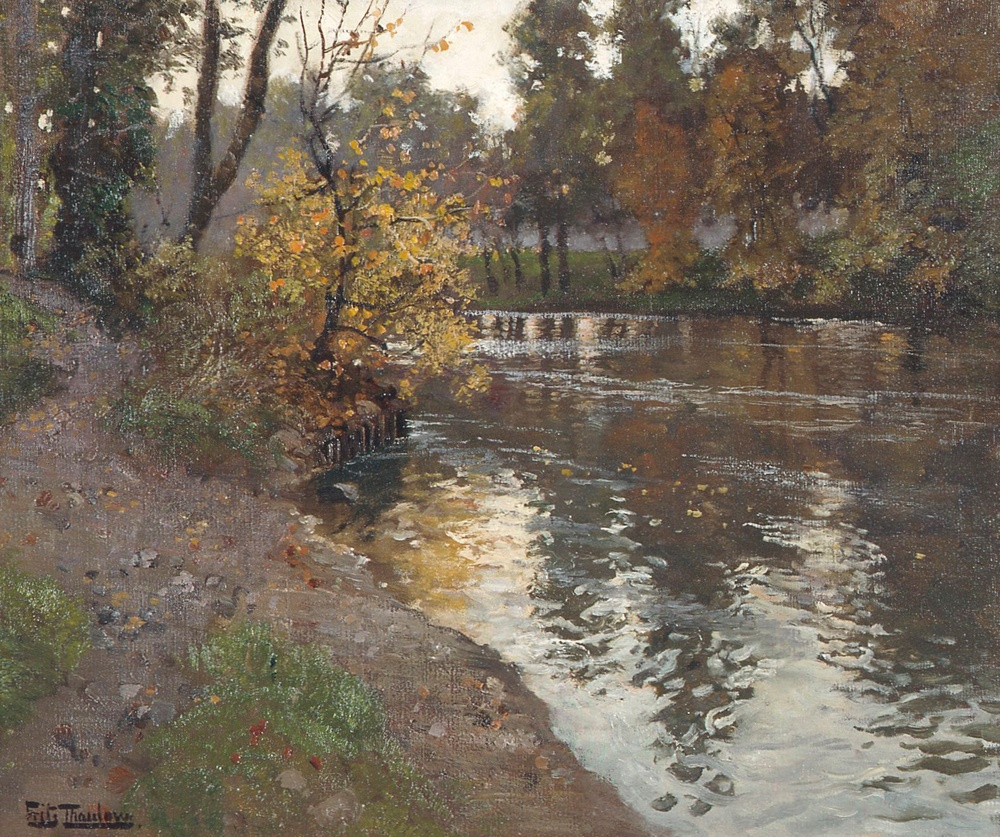
Paysage 1903

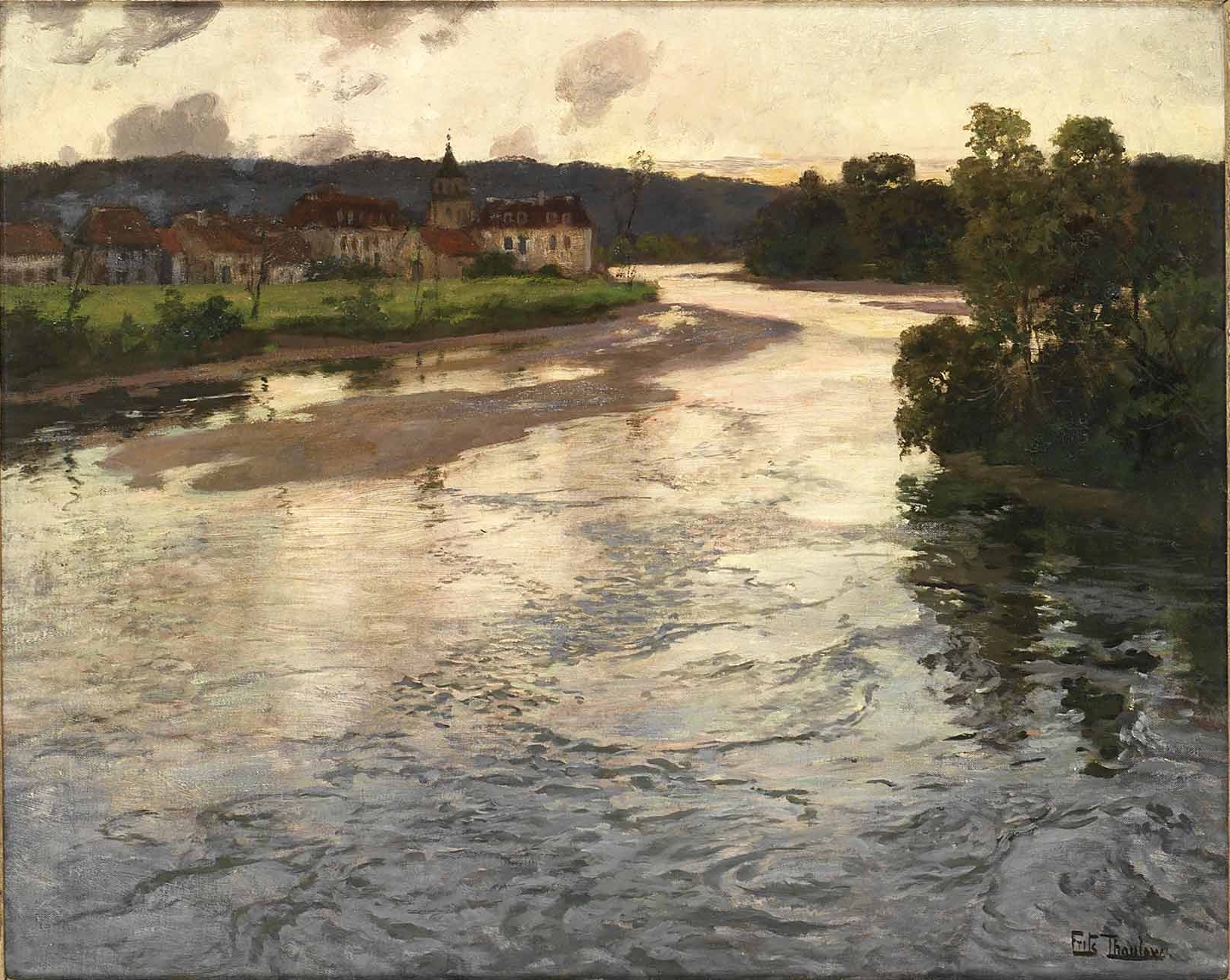
La Dordogne 1903

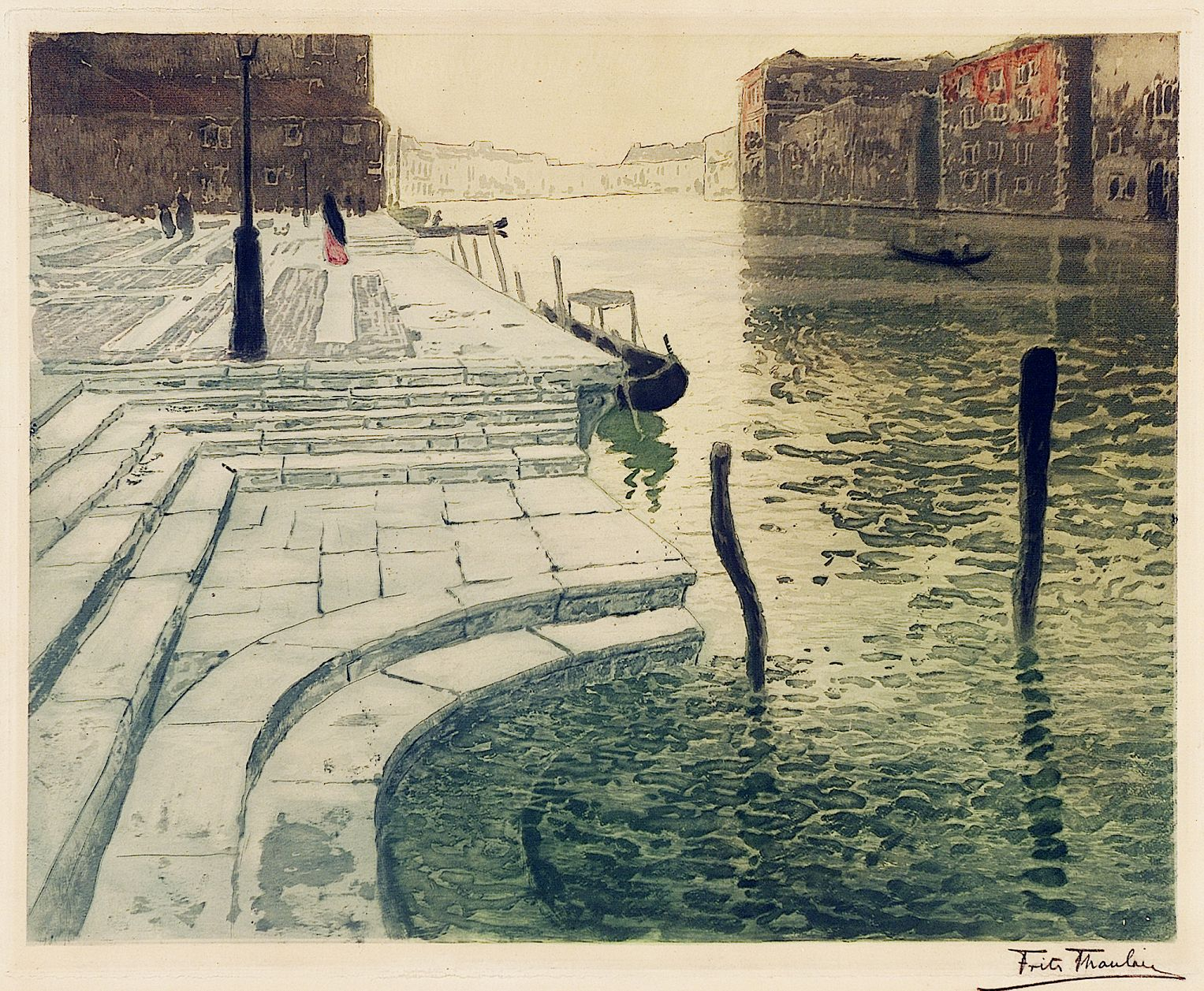
Marmortrappen 1903

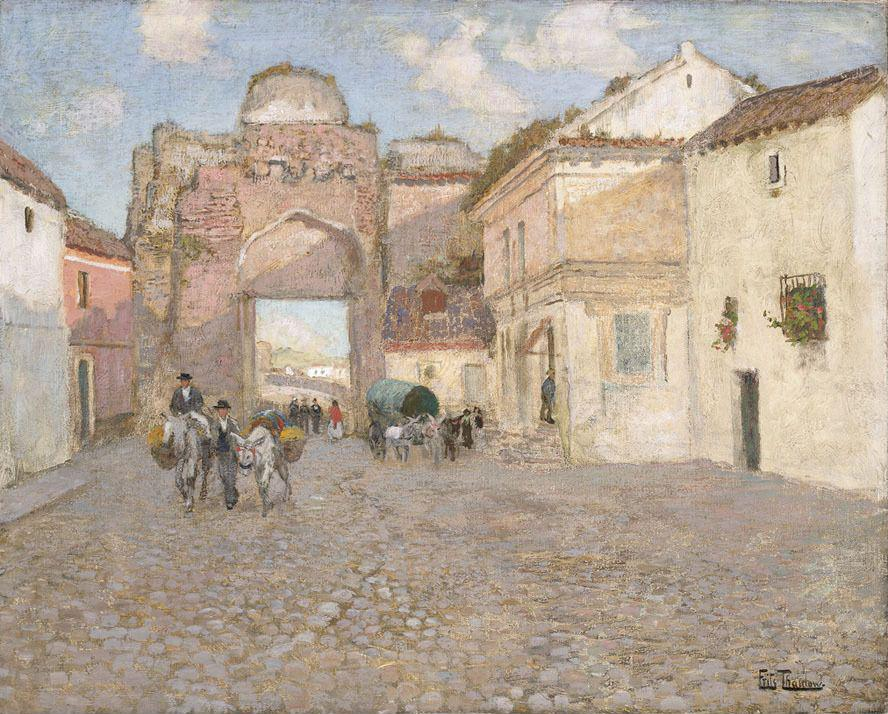
Square in Cordova 1903

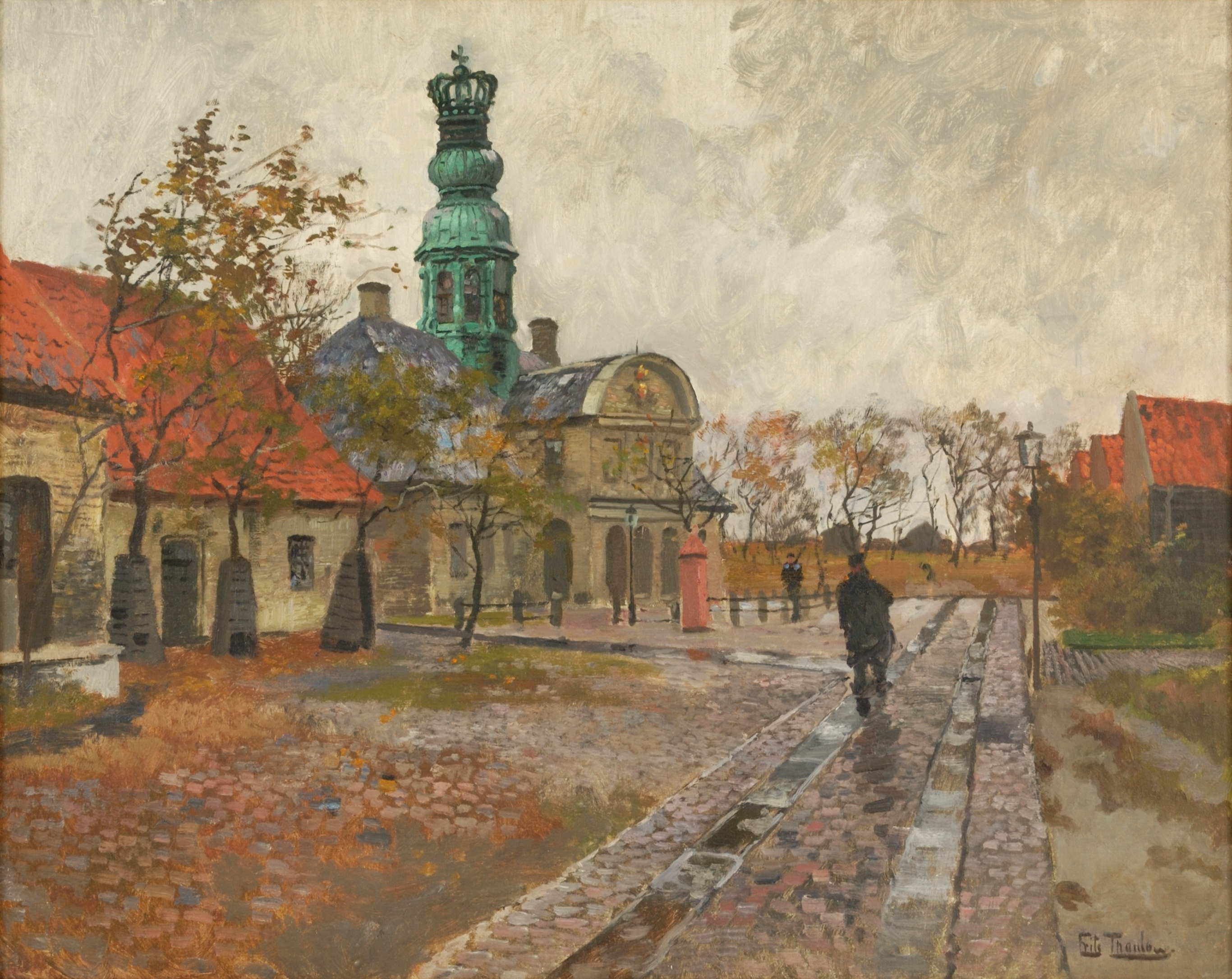
Nyholms Vagt 1904

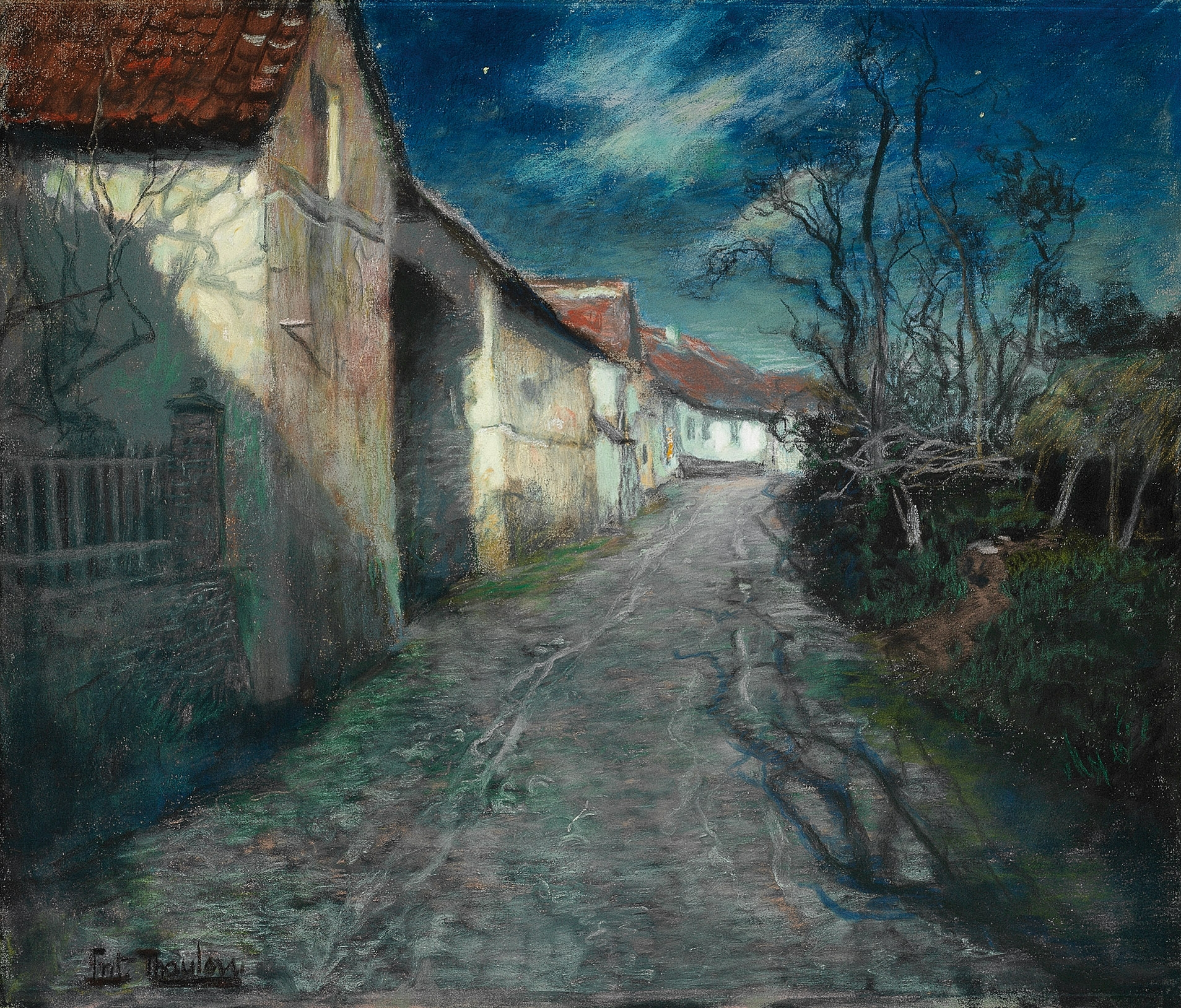
Moonlight in Beaulieu 1904

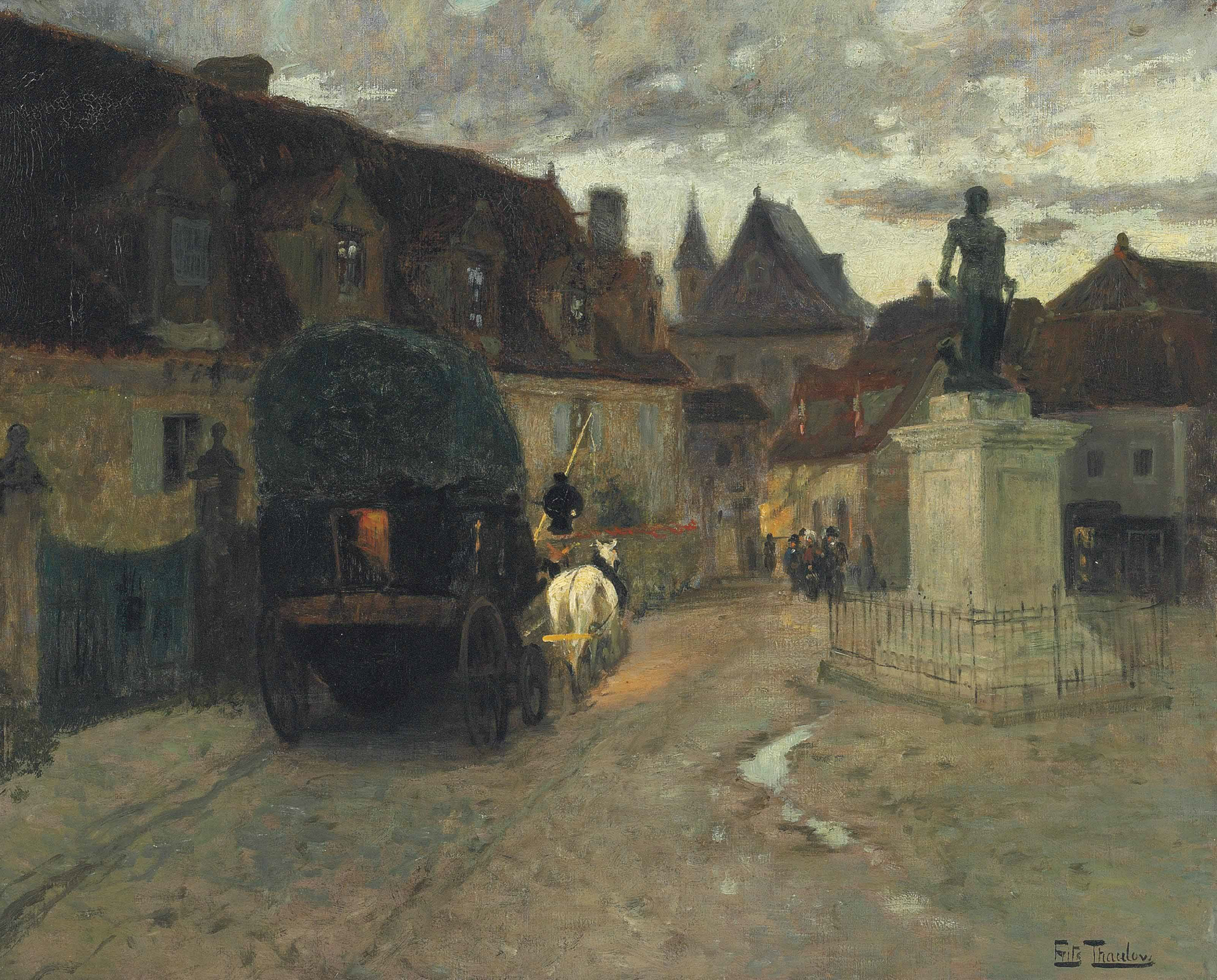
Place Marbot 1904

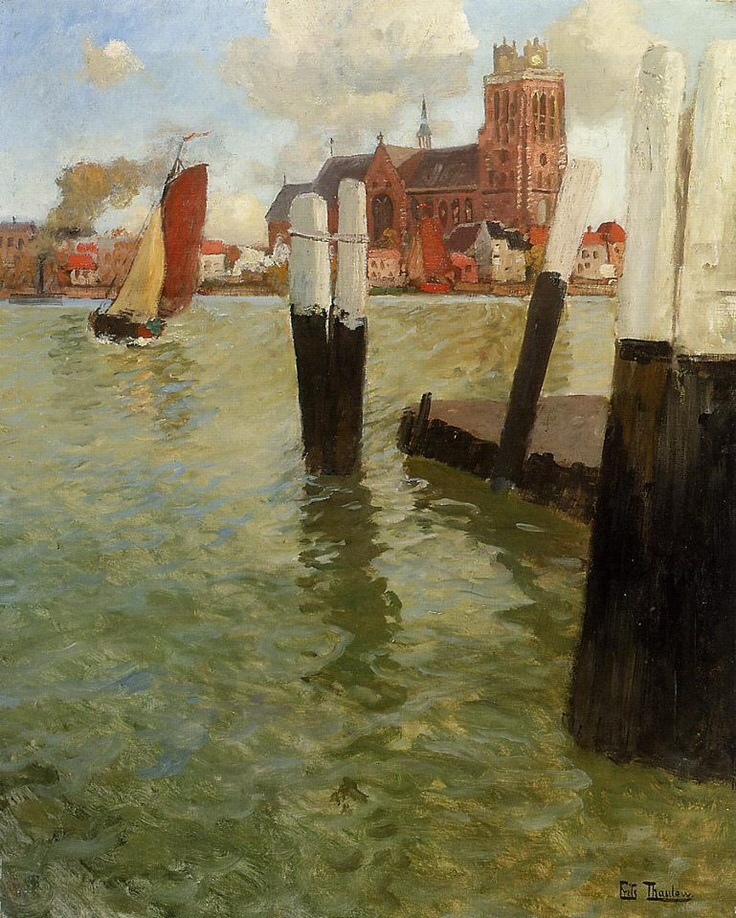
Dordrecht 1905

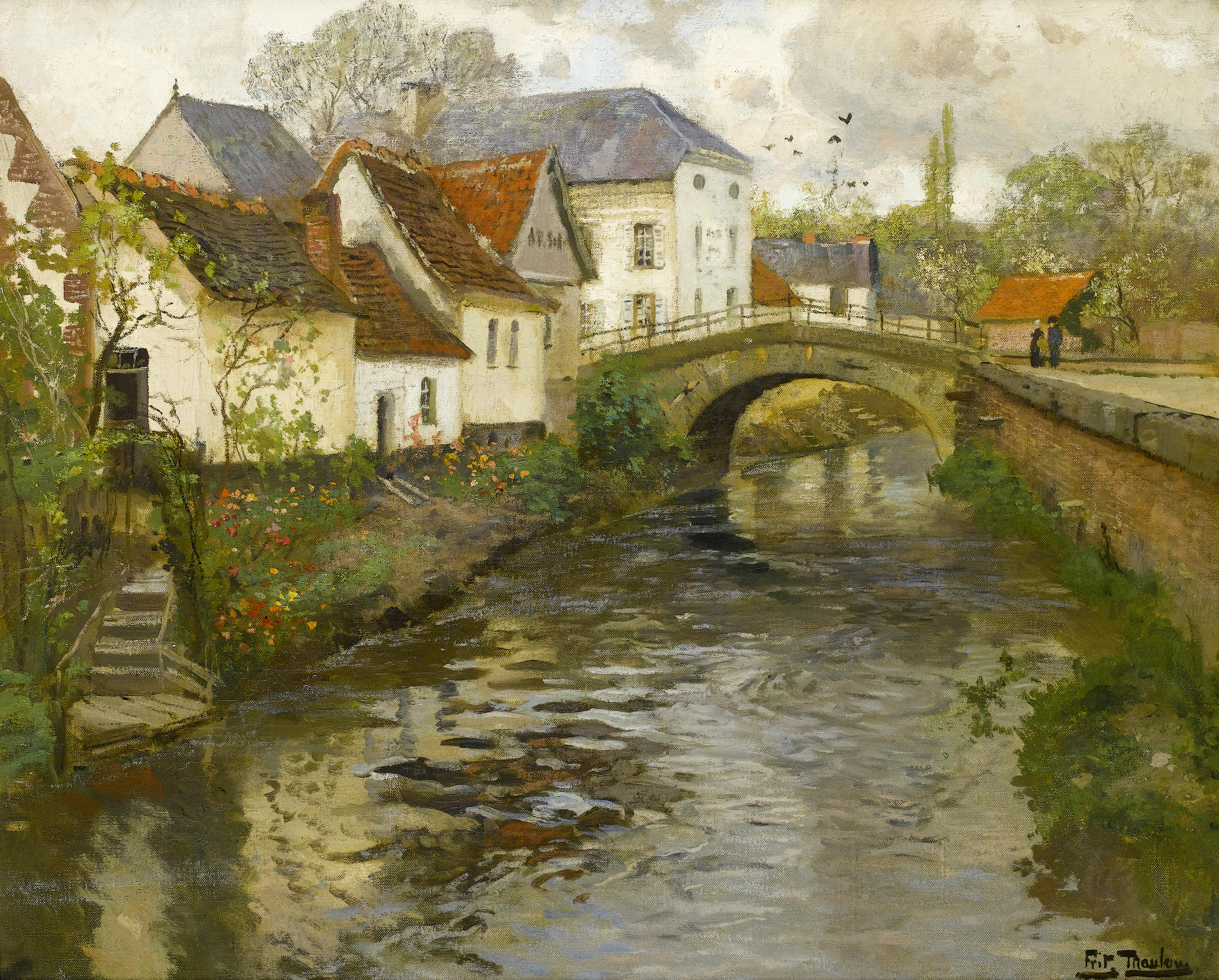
Small Town near La Panne 1905

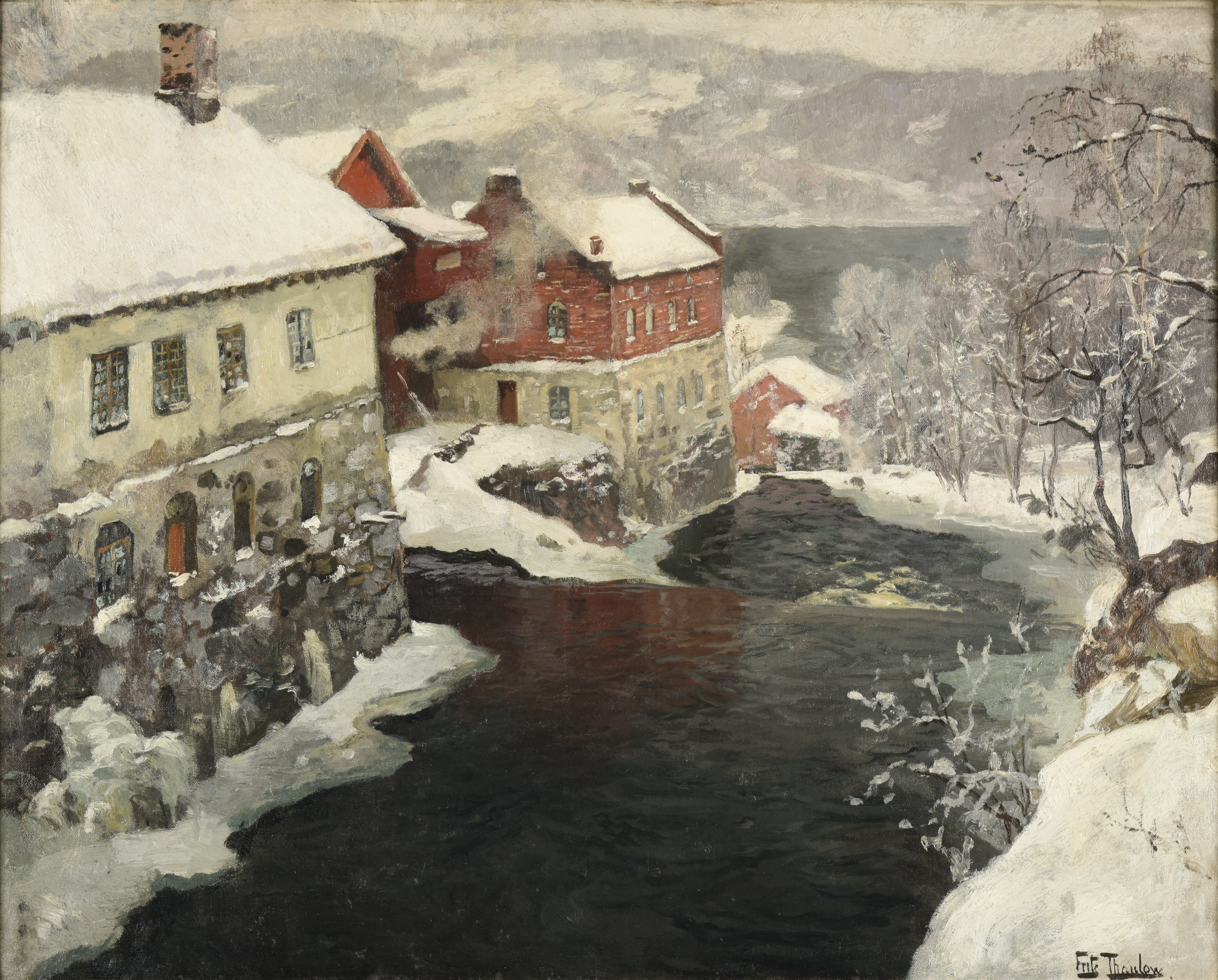
Fabriques en Norvège, les deux moulins sur la rivière Mesma 1905

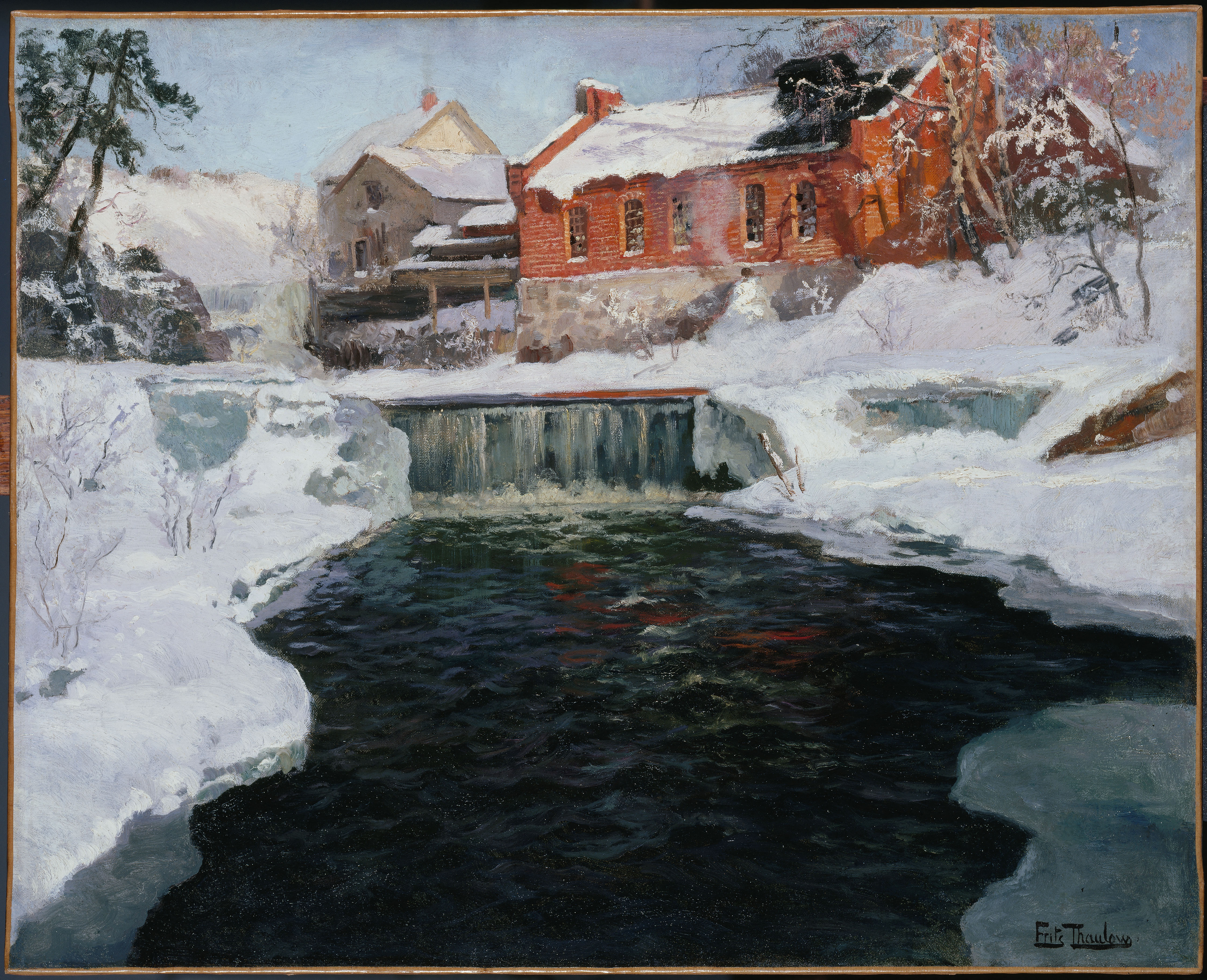
La nouvelle fabrique à Lillehammer 1905–1906

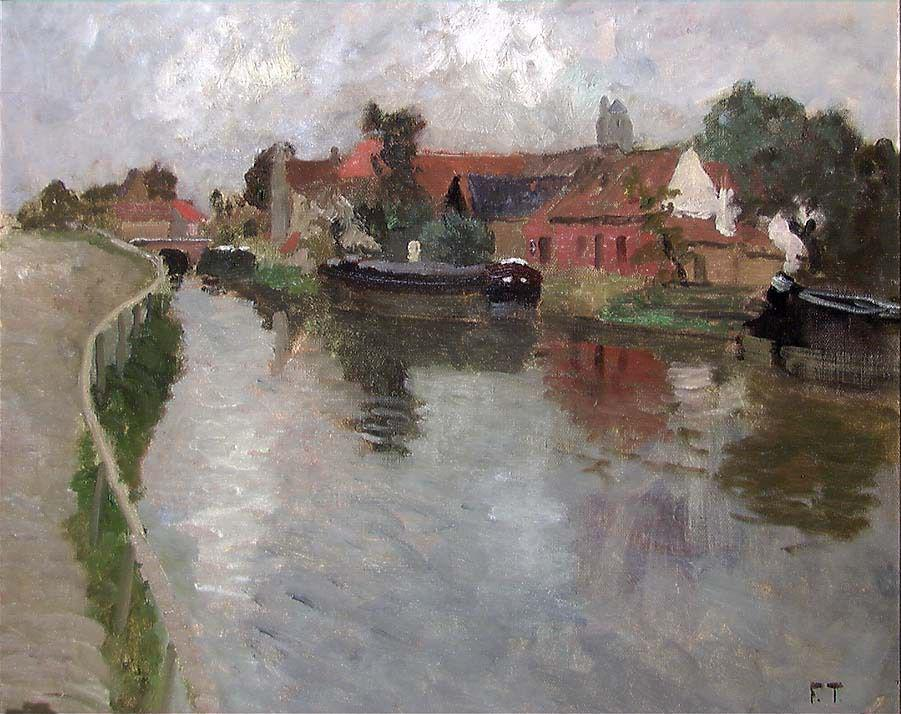
Canal in Volendam 1906

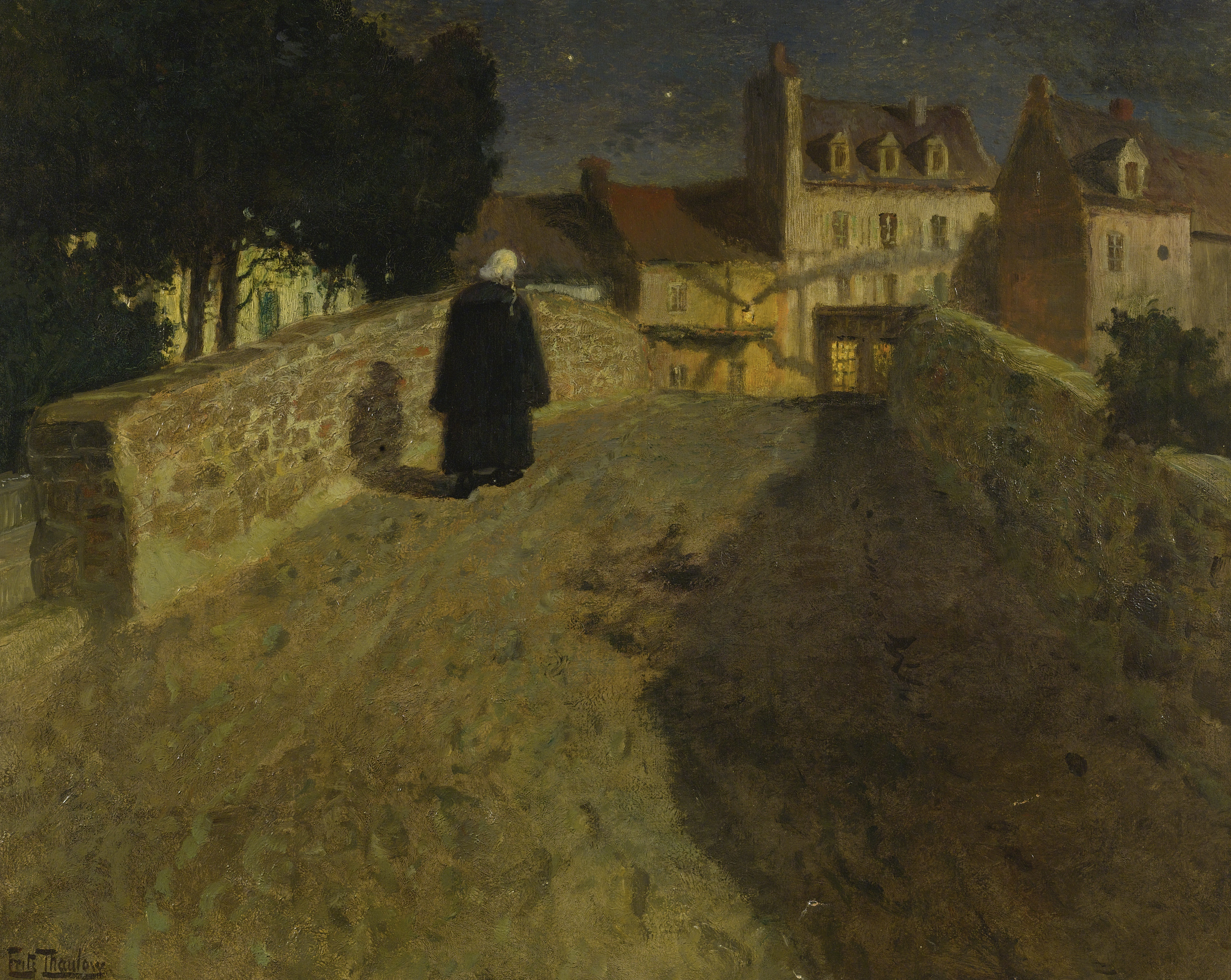
Towards the Pont Lovignon in Quimperlé 1906

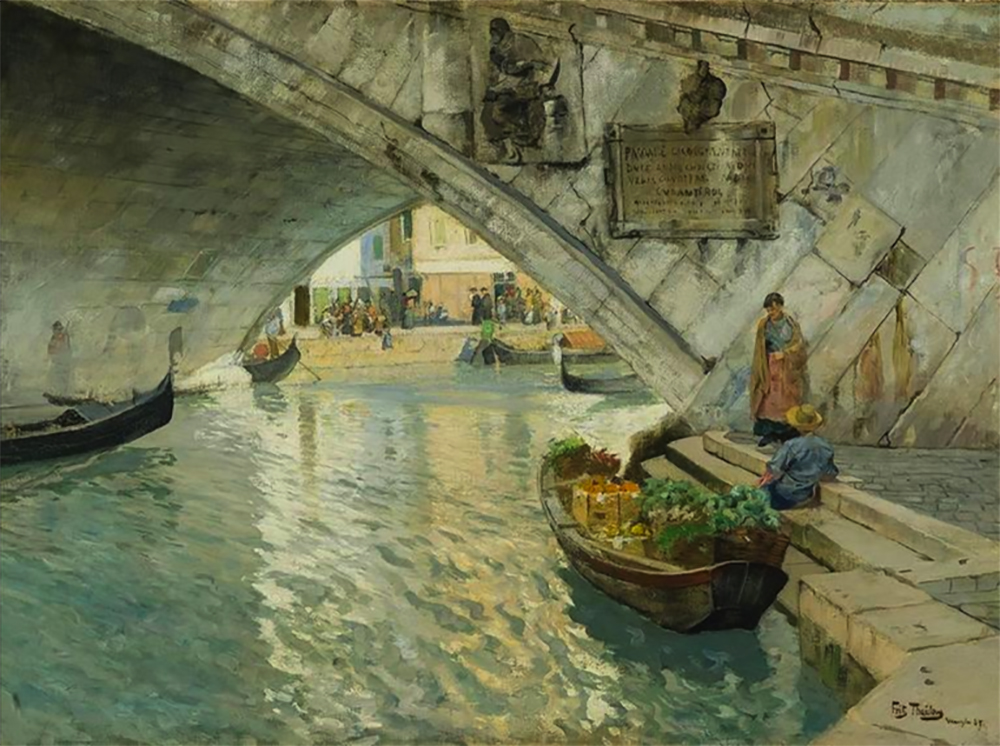
Under the Rialto Bridge of Venice

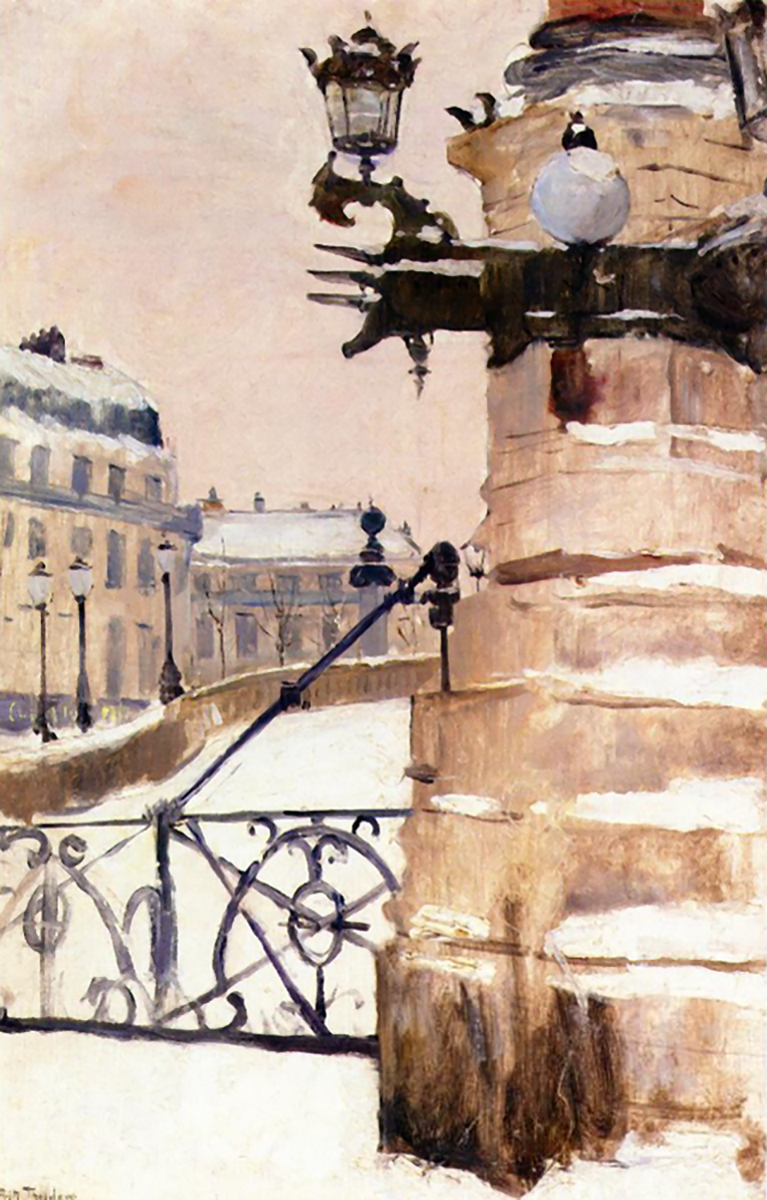
Winter in Paris

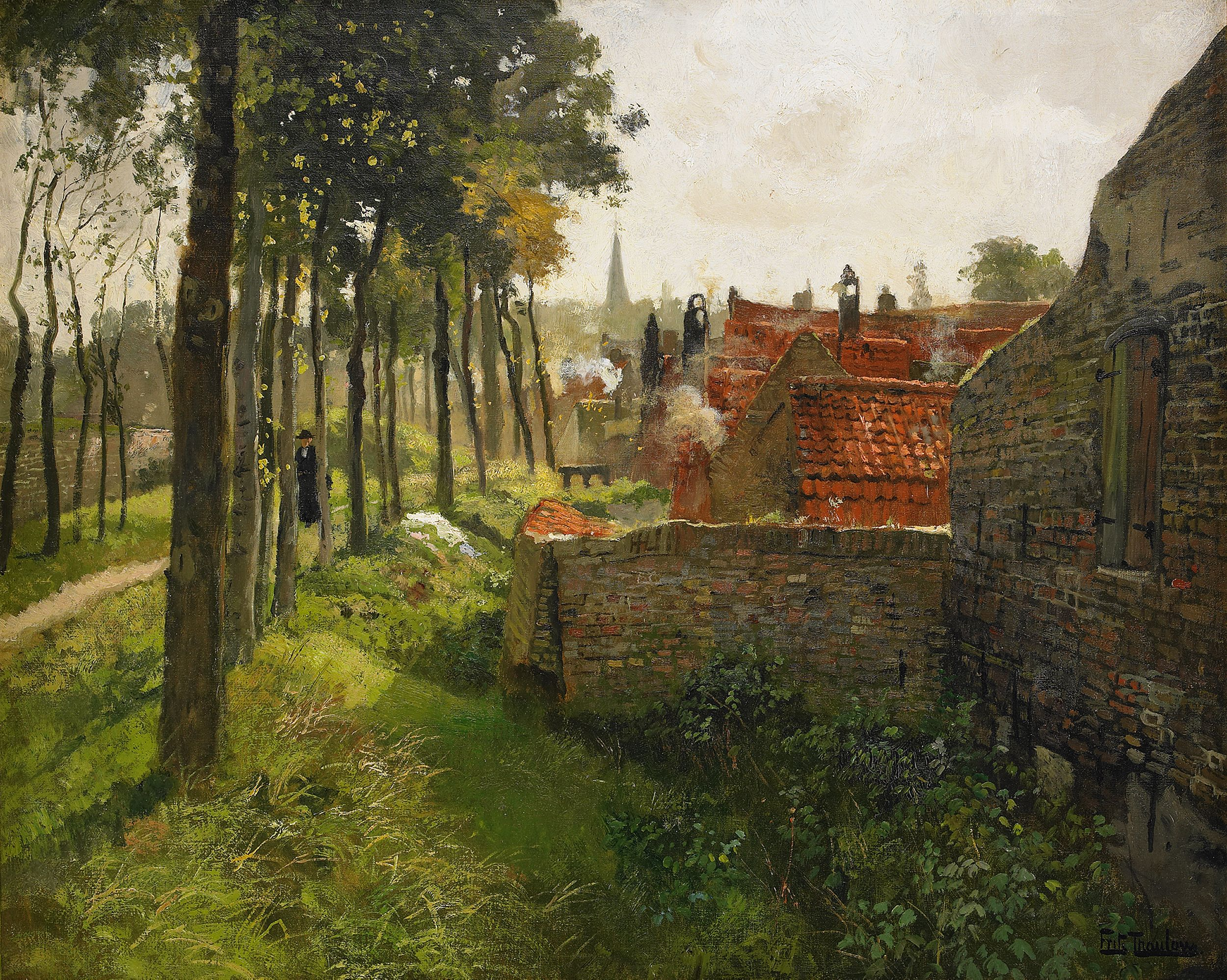
The Priest

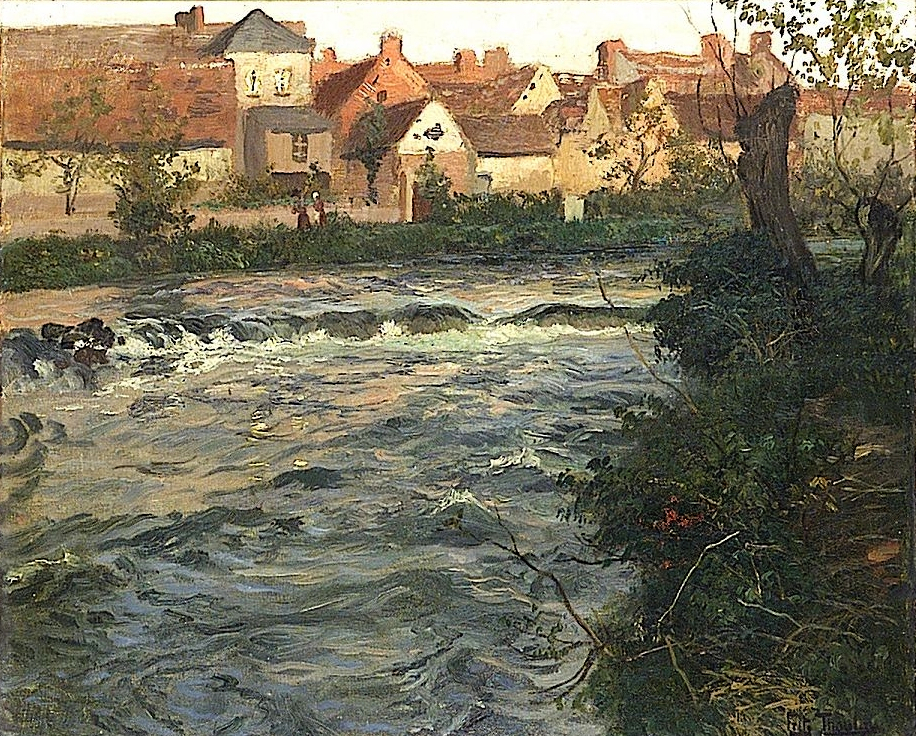
Paysage et Riviere

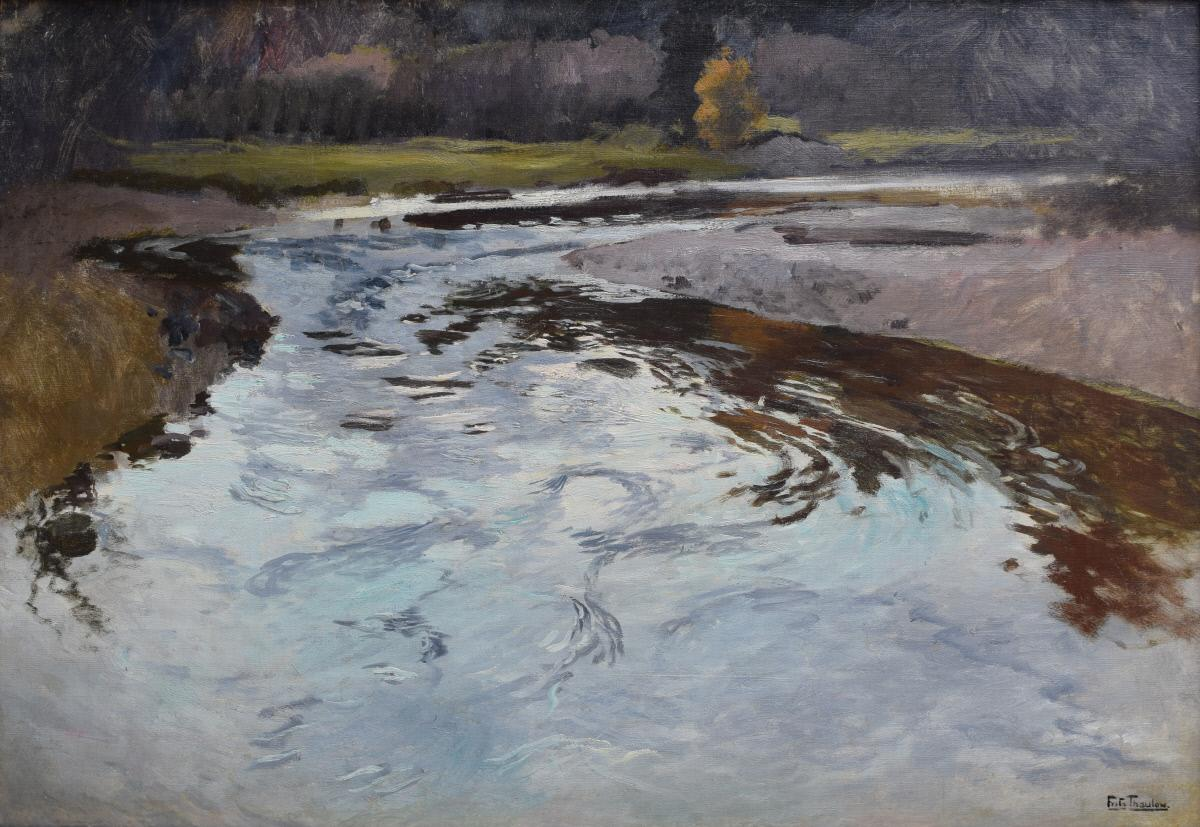
The River at Beaulieu

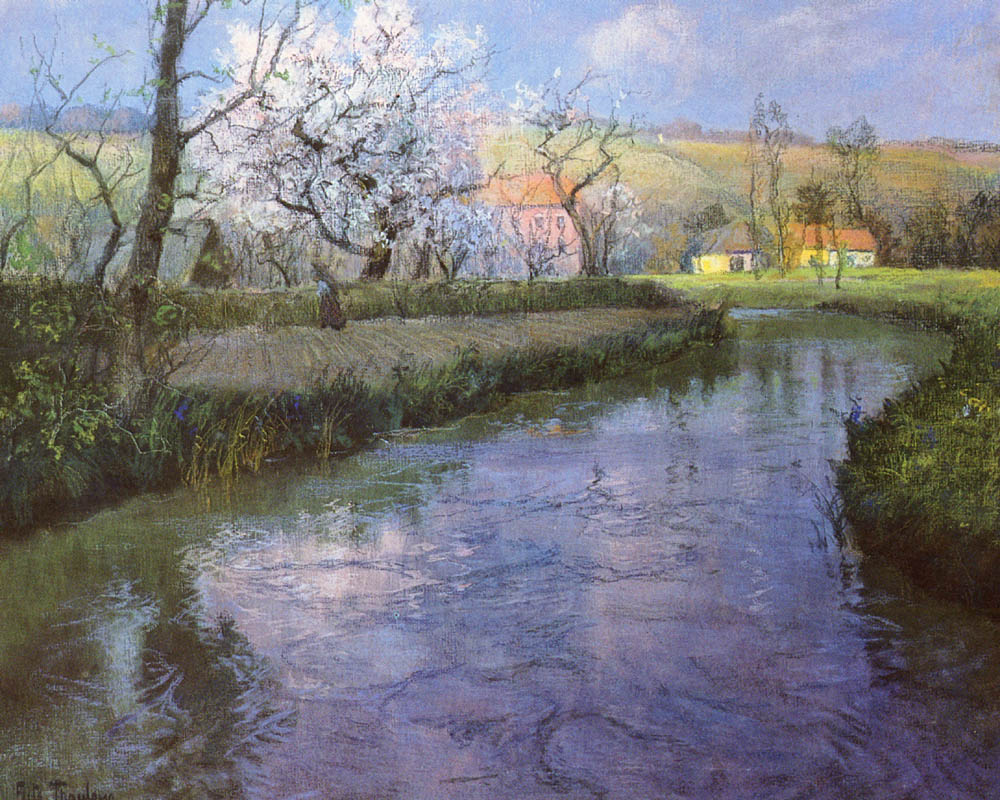
A French River Landscape

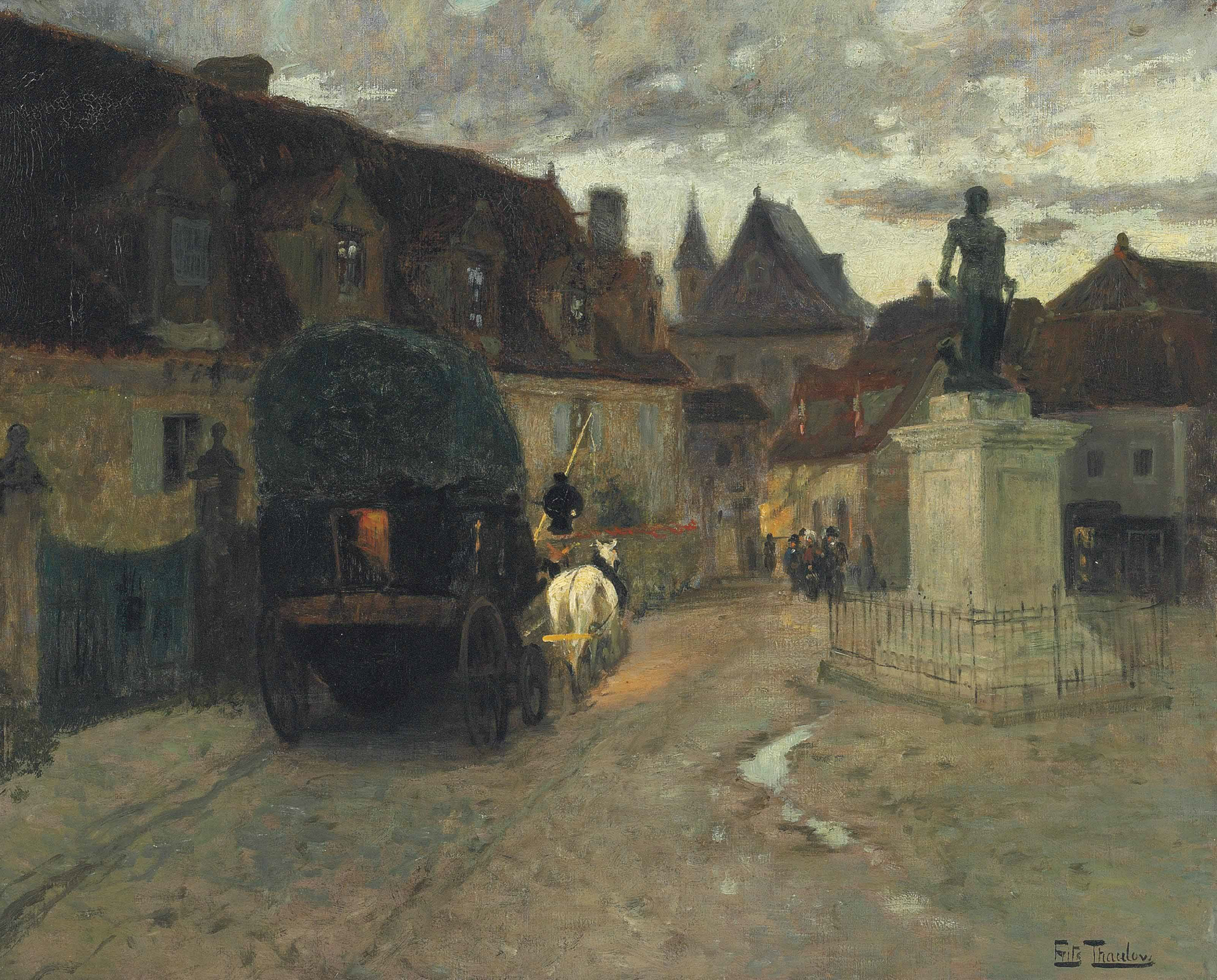
Place Marbot

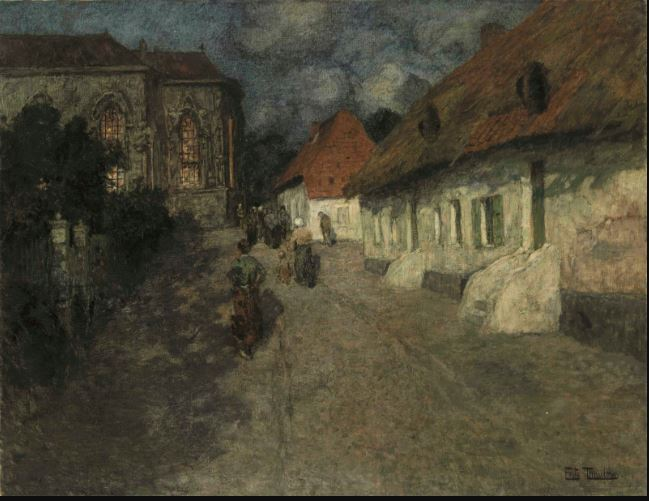
Midnight Mass

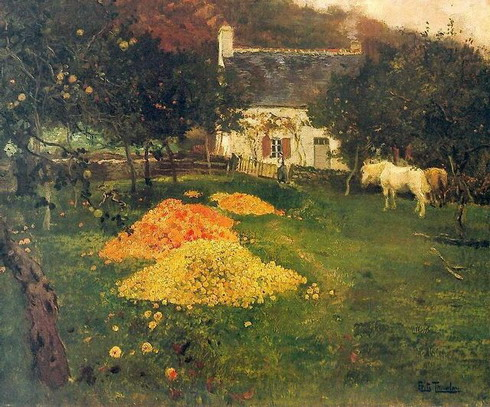
La Verger (An Orchard)

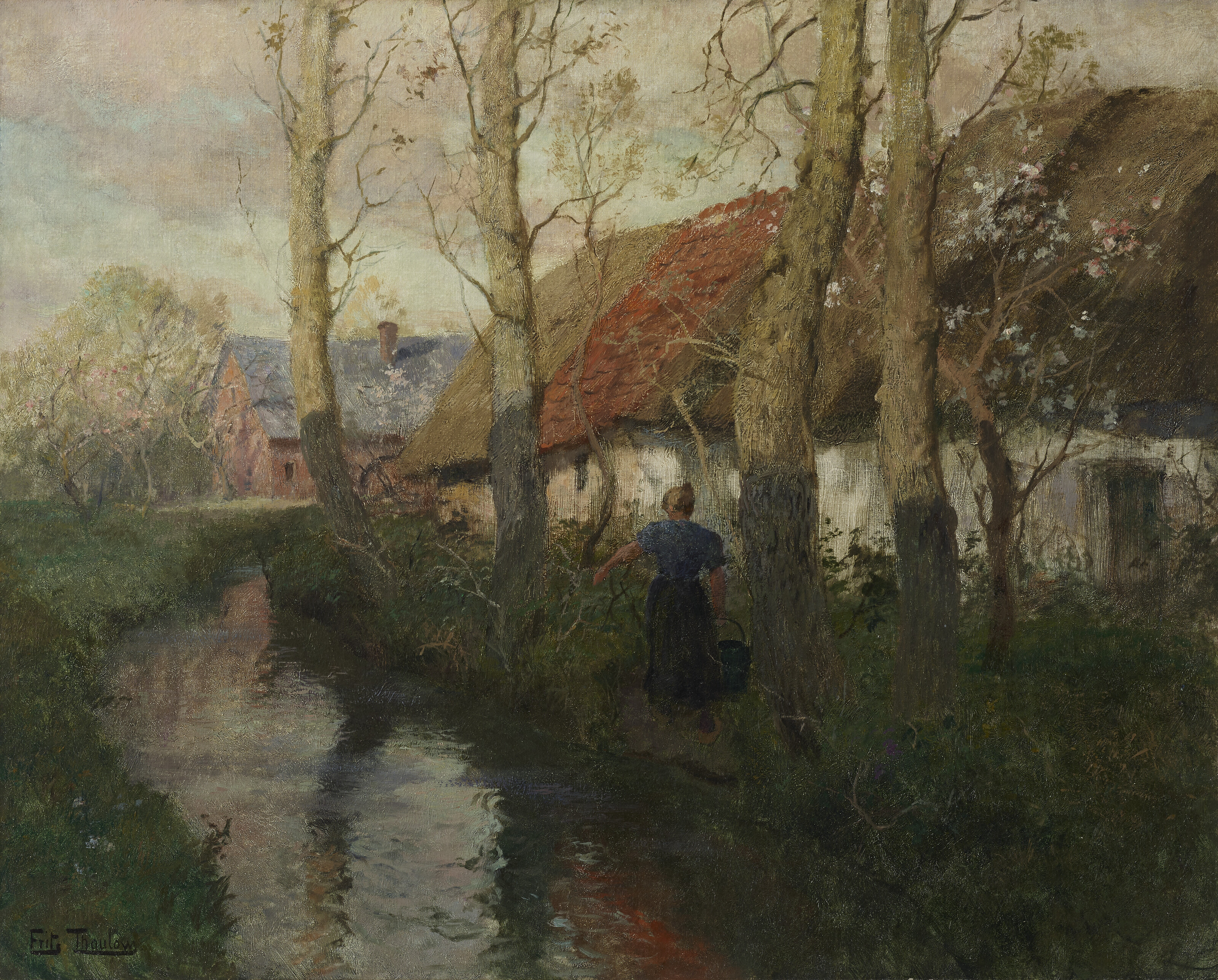
A River in Normandy with a Woman Carrying Water

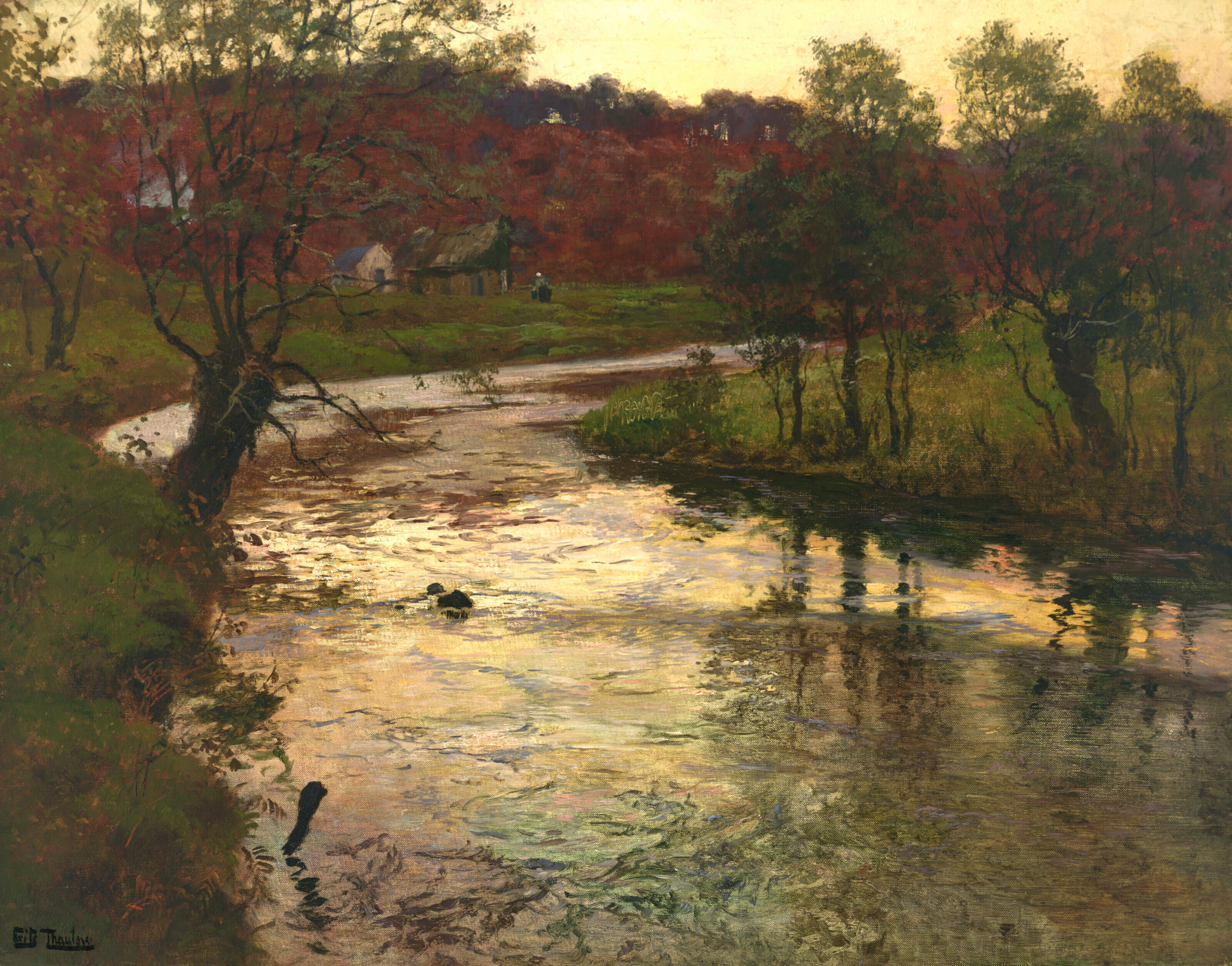
Sunset over L'Elle river, near Quimperlé, France

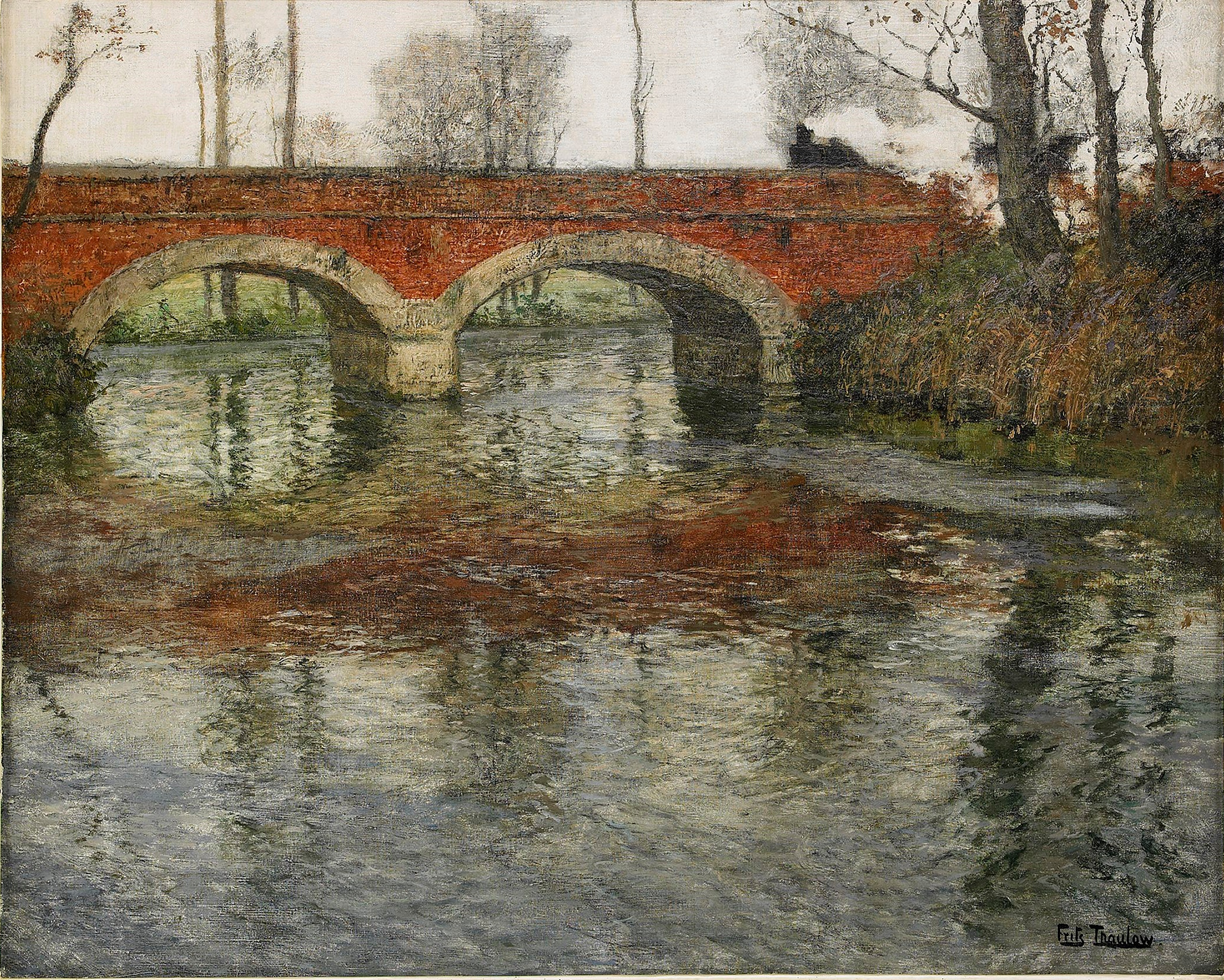
French river landscape with a stone bridge

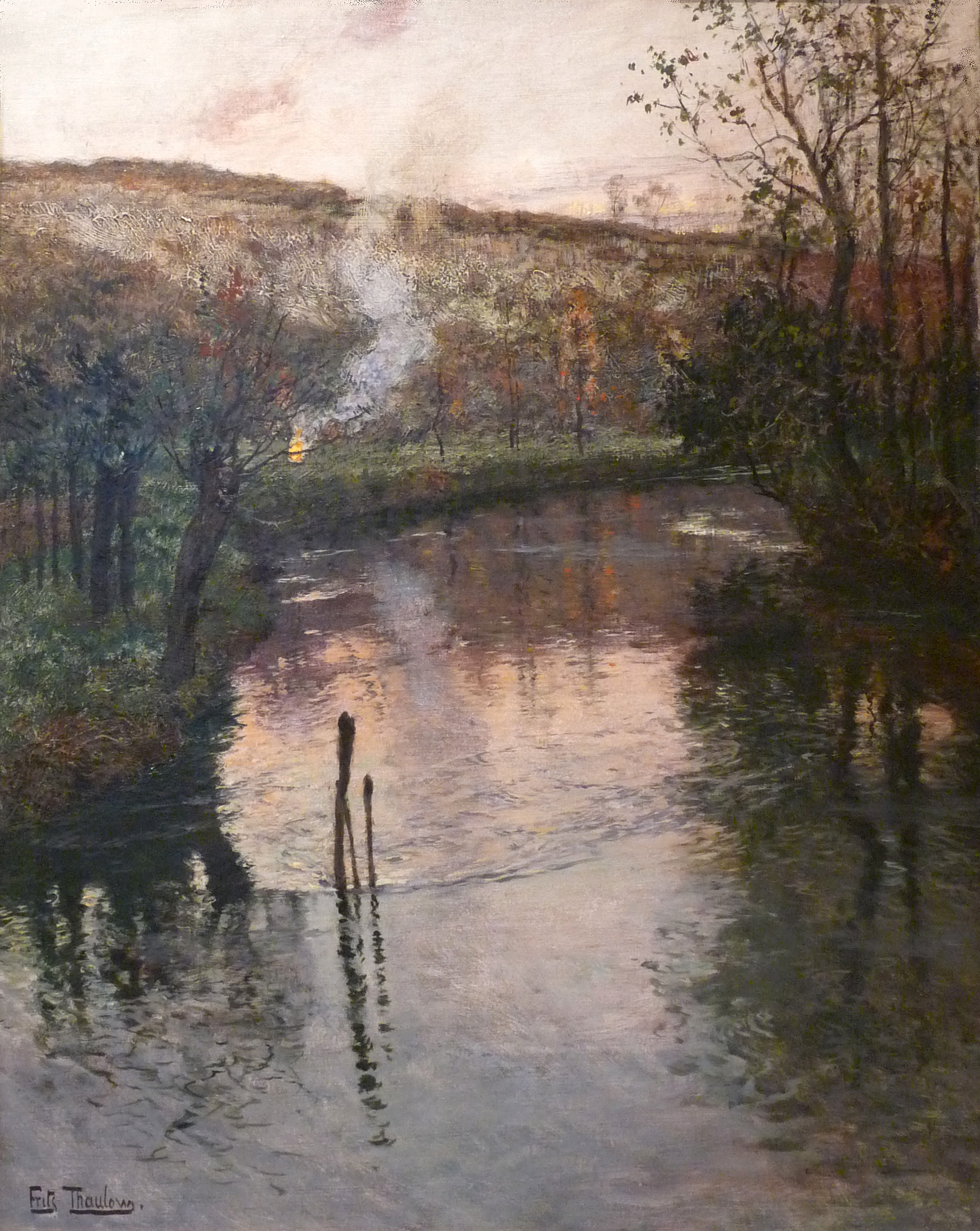
Soleil couchant sur l'Arques à Péquigny

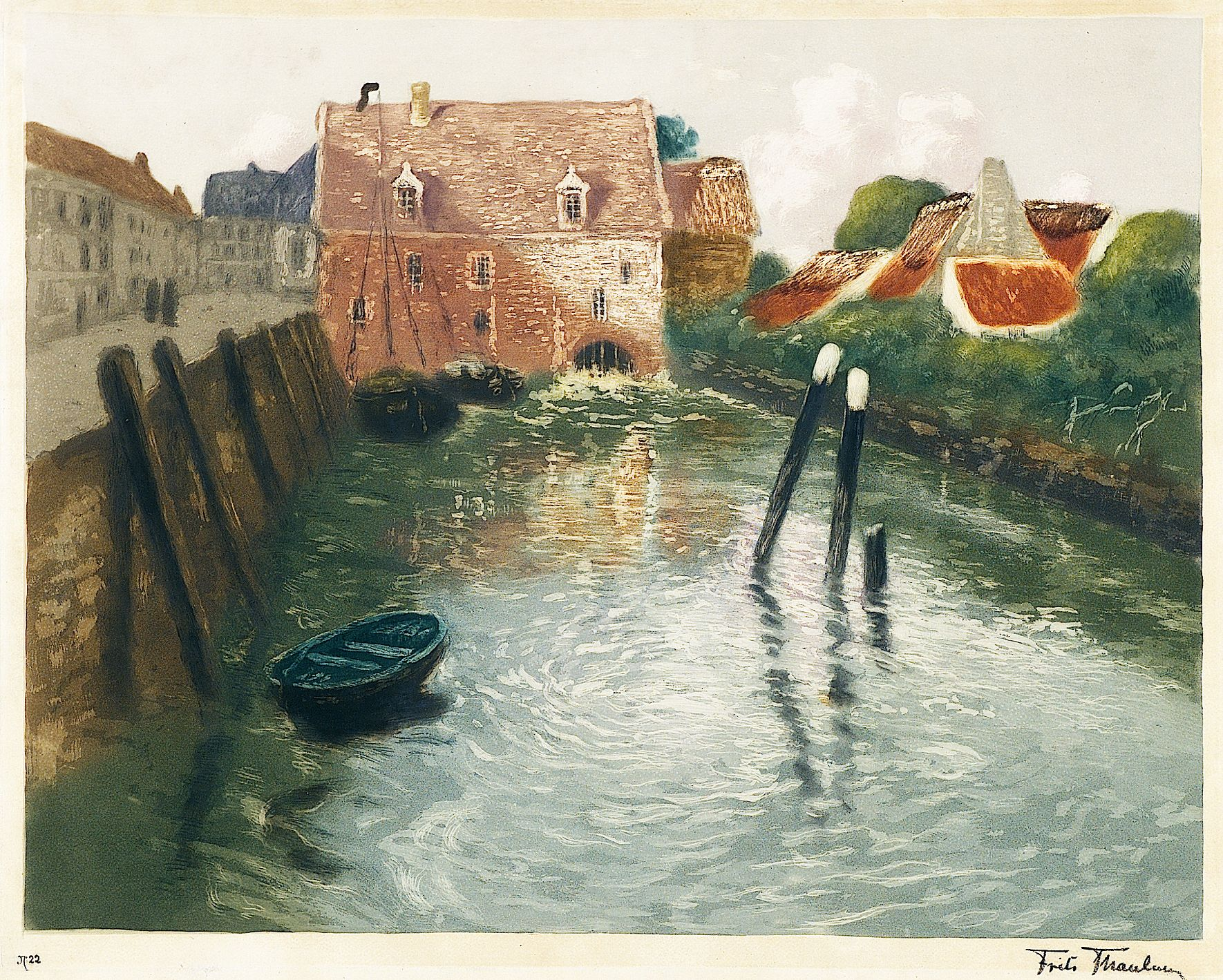
Kanal med vannmølle

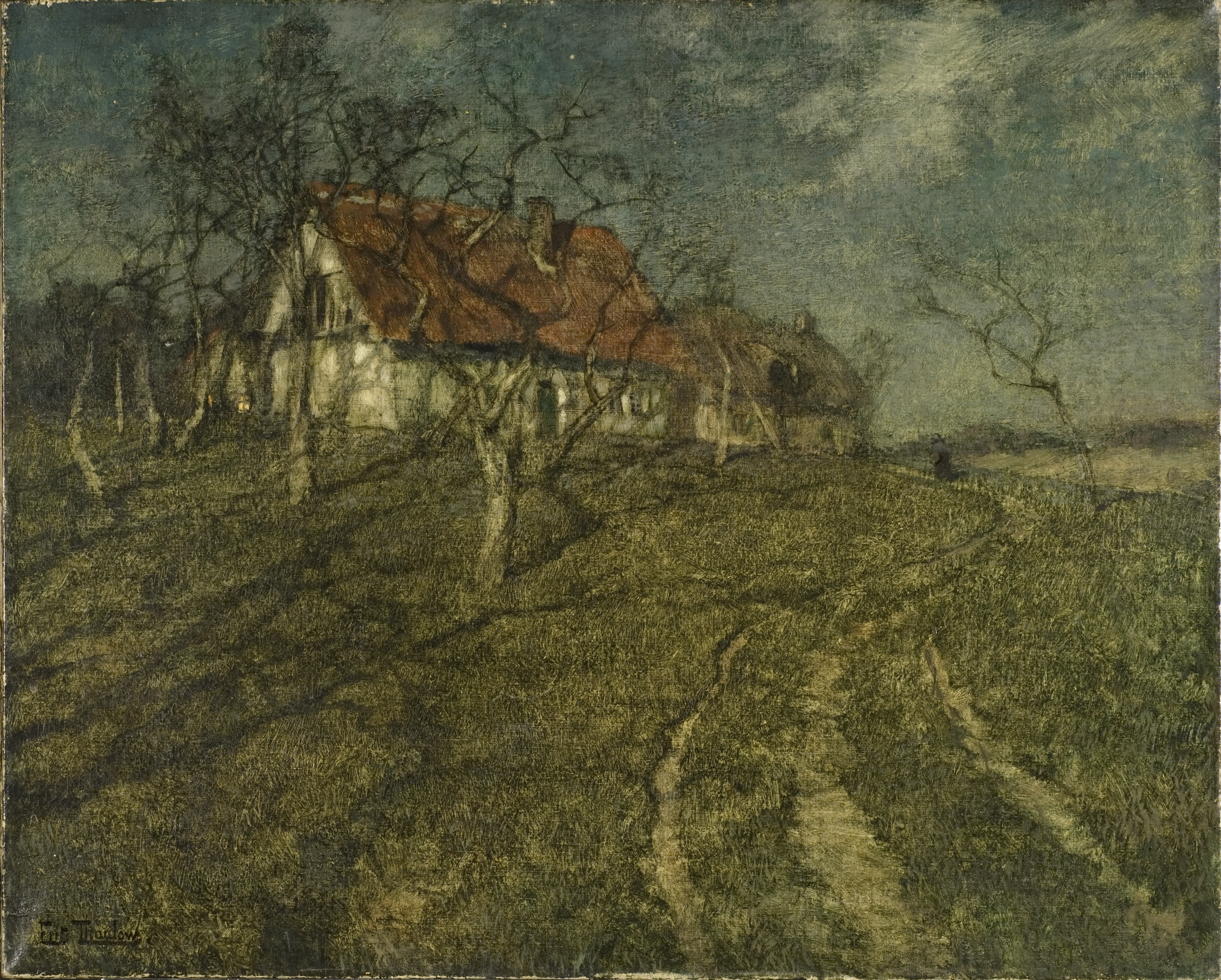
Shadows

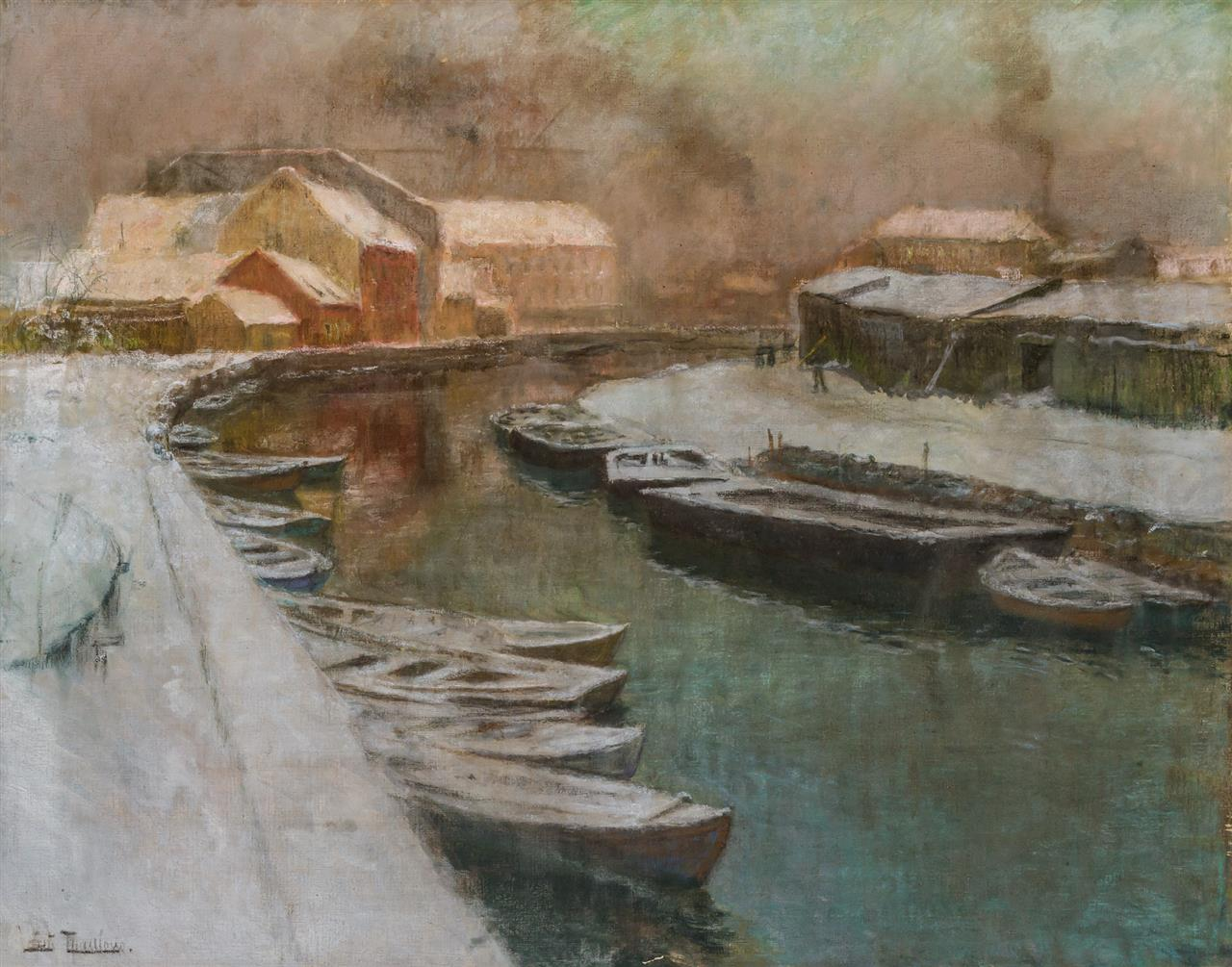
Winter on the Canal

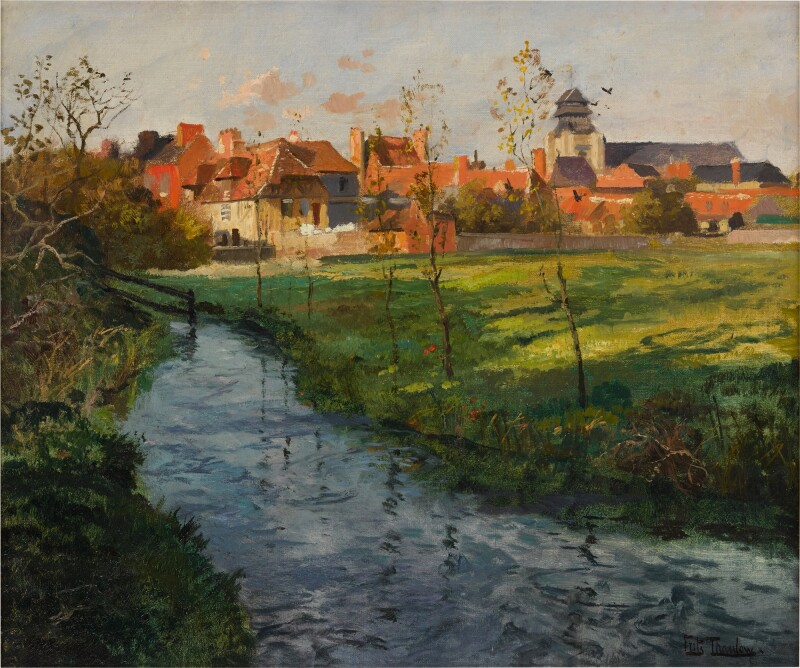
Village by a Stream

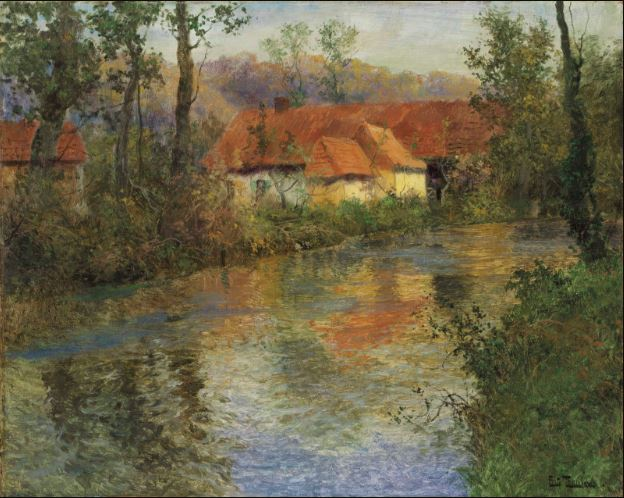
Ferme aux toits rouges sur les bords de l’Arques, fin d’été

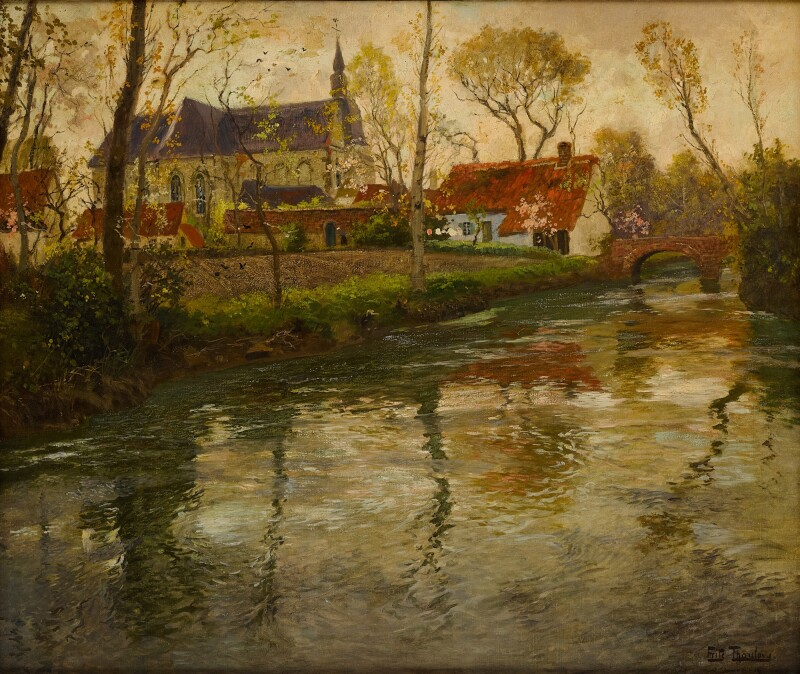
A River Landscape with a Church Beyond

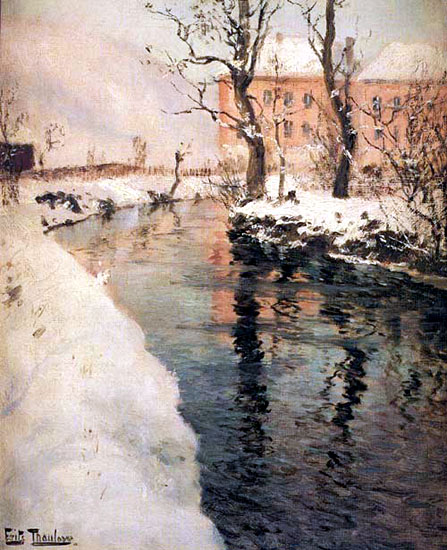
Rio en invierno

== Other sources ==
- Pakenham, Simona. Sixty Miles from England: The English at Dieppe 1814-1914, (London, Macmillan, 1967).
- Poulsson, Vidar Frits Thaulow: 1847-1906 (B.A. Mathisen. 1992) ISBN 978-82-91255-00-2.
- Poulsson, Vidar; Thune, Richard M. Frits Thaulow (Hirschl & Adler Galleries; 1985).
- Haverkamp, Frode (trans. Joan Fuglesang) Hans Fredrik Gude: From National Romanticism to Realism in Landscape (Aschehoug. 1992) ISBN 978-82-03-17072-0.
