= Anti-Catholicism in Norway =

Anti-Catholicism in Norway, was from 1537 onwards, persecution of Catholics in Norway, and the Counter-Reformation movement in the country. The persecutions was orchestrated by the Kings of Denmark–Norway, but after 1814 it was orchestrated by the Norwegian government.

== The Reformation in Norway ==
The Reformation in Norway was accomplished by force in 1537. King Christian III declared Lutheranism to be the official religion of Norway, and the Catholic archbishop of Norway, Olav Engelbrektsson, fled into exile in Lier in the Netherlands, now in Belgium. Catholic priests and bishops were persecuted, monastic orders were suppressed, and the crown took over church property, while some churches were plundered and abandoned, even destroyed. In 1555, two farmers were executed by burning at the stake in Vestfold, for preaching Catholic teachings. In 1573, a woman named Ingeborg Kjeldsdatter from Skiptvet, in Østfold was flogged, because she had practiced Catholic Marian devotion. In 1604, a law was passed, that made it illegal hiring anyone who had attended Jesuit schools in positions in schools and churches.

== The Gjerpen Trial ==
Following the events of the Protestant Reformation, the Catholic Church and its missionary organization, the Society of Jesus, strived to regain control of the religion in Northern Europe. In 1612 it was reported that some prominent priests in Norway had undertaken studies at Jesuit colleges, and that they secretly supported Catholicism. Several of these suspected Catholic priests were called to the country's highest court of law, called Herredag. The trial was held at the vicarage of Gjerpen Church just outside the town of Skien, and started on 2 August 1613. Among the suspects was Christoffer Hjort, vicar in Aker and priest at the chapel of Akershus Castle, and his two brothers Jakob Hjort and Evert Hjort. Also the priest Herman Hanssøn was among the suspects. Niels Claussøn Senning, Bishop of the Diocese of Oslo, was responsible for the inquisitions. King Christian IV of Denmark and Norway was present at the trial, and he had ordered all bishops of the country to attend. The trial ended on 21 August. Several of the priests were found guilty. They were convicted to loss of benefice and inheritance, and were instructed to leave the country. Two suspected students, Petrus Alphæus and Mogens Haakenssøn, were also expelled from the country.

== After the Trial ==
A decree dated 28 February 1624 made it explicitly illegal for Jesuits and monks to be in the country. Offenders risked the death penalty, and those who supported the Jesuits or monks by providing lodging or food risked severe punishment. In 1646 the regulations were somewhat relaxed, as foreign sailors were then allowed to practice their religion at three dedicated locations, in Oslo Old Town, Nordnes and Christianssand. But during the reigns of Christian IV`s son Frederick III and grandson Christian V, laws against Catholicism became more strict.

== After 1814 ==
After the dissolution of Denmark-Norway in 1814, the new Norwegian Constitution of 1814 did not grant religious freedom, as it stated that Jews and Jesuits were denied entrance to Norway. It also stated that attendance in a Lutheran church was compulsory, effectively banning Catholics. The ban on Catholicism was lifted in 1842, and the ban on Jews was lifted in 1851. At first, there were multiple restrictions on the practice of Catholicism and only foreign citizens were allowed to practice (including the then Queen of Sweden and Norway Josephine of Leuchtenberg). The first post-reformation parish was founded in 1843, Catholics were only allowed to celebrate Mass in this one parish. In 1845 most restrictions on non-Lutheran Christian denominations were lifted, and Catholics were now allowed to practice their religion freely, but monasticism and Jesuits were first allowed as late as 1897 and 1956 respectively.

== See also ==
- Conventicle Act (Denmark–Norway)
- Dissenter Act (Norway)
- Freedom of religion in Norway
- Jew clause
- Jesuit clause
