= Valen-Sendstad =

Valen-Sendstad is a surname. Notable people with the surname include:

- Fartein Valen-Sendstad (1918–1984), Norwegian historian
- Magne Valen-Sendstad (1913–1984), Norwegian priest
- Olav Valen-Sendstad (1904–1963), Norwegian theologian
