= Conventicle Act =

Conventicle Act may refer to:

- English Acts of Parliament:
  - Conventicle Act 1664
  - Conventicles Act 1670
- Conventicle Act (Sweden), in effect 1726–1858 in Sweden and until 1870 in Finland
- Conventicle Act (Denmark–Norway); in effect 1741–1848 in Denmark and until 1842 in Norway

== See also ==
- Religion Act 1592, in England
