= Valen (surname) =

- Gender: Male

Origin
- Origin: Latin nomen Valentinus
- Region of origin: Italy

Valen is a surname. Notable people with the surname include:

- Anita Valen (born 1968), Norwegian cyclist
- Fartein Valen (1887–1952), Norwegian composer and musical theorist
- Henry Valen (1924–2007), Norwegian political scientist
- Inge Valen (born 1951), Norwegian footballer
- Kristian Valen (born 1974), Norwegian comedian and musician
- Monica Valen (born 1970), Norwegian cyclist
- Nancy Valen (born 1965), American actress and television producer
- Neri Valen (1893–1954), Norwegian politician
- Snorre Valen (born 1984), Norwegian musician and politician

== See also ==
- Valen-Sendstad
- Ritchie Valens
