= Magne Valen-Sendstad =

Norwegian priest

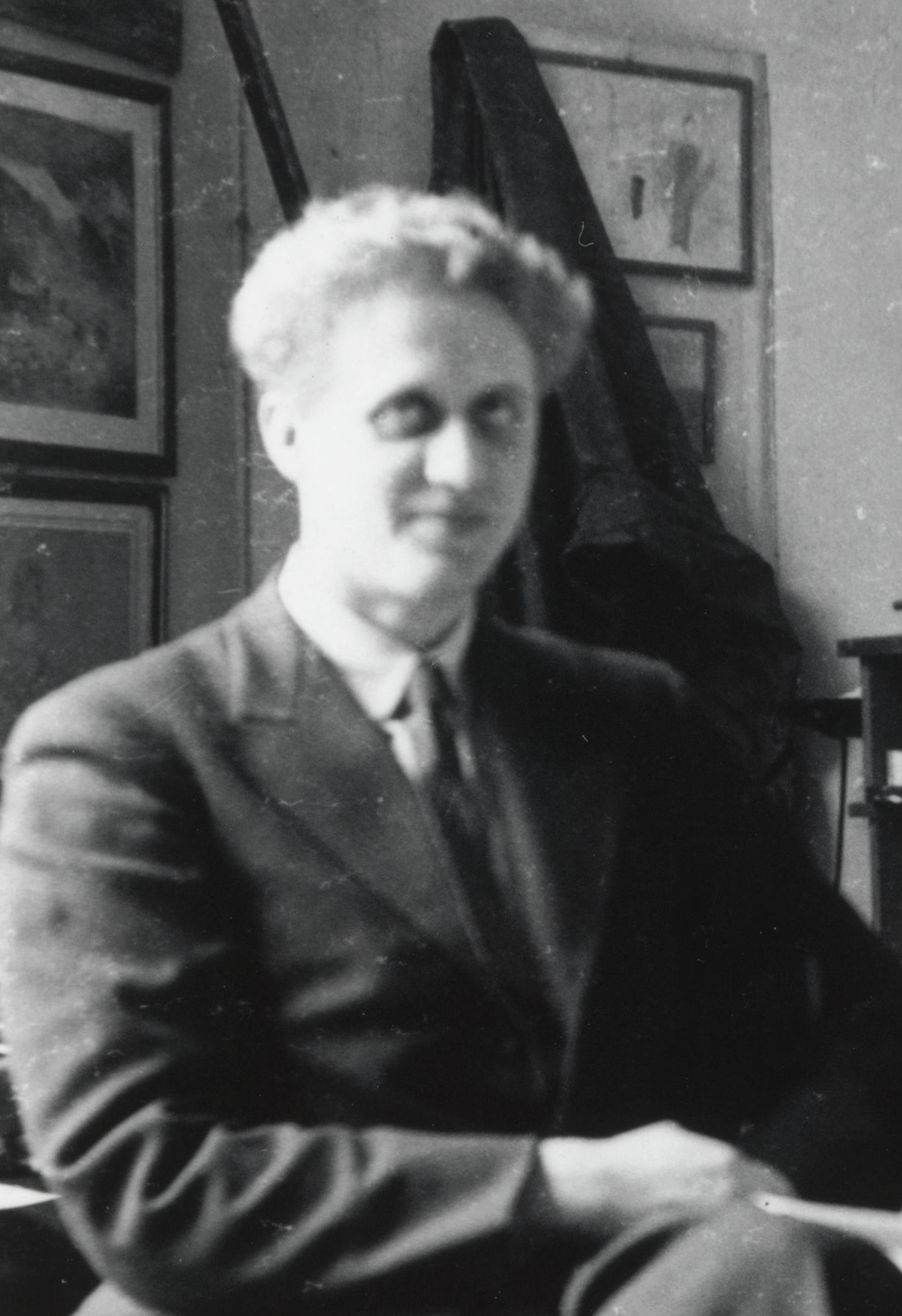
A picture of Magne Livius Valen-Sendstad, 1938

Magne Livius Valen-Sendstad (13 October 1913 – 1984) was a Norwegian priest.

He was born in Kristiania as a son of Aksel Magnus Sendstad (1872–1922) and Magnhild Erika Valen (1880–1959). He was a nephew of Olav Sendstad and brother of Olav Valen-Sendstad and museum director Fartein Valen-Sendstad. In 1941 he married Jenny Lie.

He finished his secondary education in 1934 and graduated with the cand.theol. degree from the MF Norwegian School of Theology in 1940. He was a bible school teacher and principal in Stavanger and Stjørdal, before being hired as vicar of Lund Church in 1957. He chaired the school board there from 1959 to 1965. In 1965 he became vicar of Randaberg Church, where he was a school board member from 1966 to 1968. From 1968 to 1980 he was the secretary-general of the Norwegian Missionary Society.

During the occupation of Norway by Nazi Germany he was imprisoned in Åkebergveien from 13 to 17 February 1943.
