= Dissenter Act (Norway) =

Norwegian law regarding religion

The Dissenter Act (Norwegian: Dissenterloven, formally Lov angaaende dem, der bekjende sig til den christelige Religion, uden at være medlemmer af Statskirken [Act concerning those who profess the Christian religion without being members of the State Church]) is a Norwegian law from 1845 that allowed Christian denominations other than the Church of Norway to establish themselves in the country. It was enacted on 16 July 1845, and remained in effect until it was replaced by the Act Relating to Religious Communities, etc. (Lov om trudomssamfunn og ymist anna) in 1969.

== Background ==
In the 1000s, Christianity took over as the leading religion in Norway, and the Old Norse religion was eliminated. The Catholic Church thus gained a religious hegemony that lasted until the Reformation in 1537. The state church took over this role, and in 1569 Frederick II decreed that all foreigners coming to the kingdom had to prove that they were Lutheran Christians; otherwise they would be deported. In Christian V's Norwegian Code of 1687, the king's position as religious leader was established, and strict church discipline was introduced. The Catholic faith survived for a time. In 1555, two peasants were burned at the stake in Hamar, and in 1575 Ingeborg Kjeldsdatter from Skiptvet was flogged; in both cases the crime was their Catholic Marian devotion.

In the 17th and 18th centuries, a number of dispensations were granted because foreigners with special expertise were needed. This was particularly the case in mines, glassworks and fortifications, where many of the professionals were German or French Catholics. However, their religious practice was severely limited, and they had no priests.

In 1814 absolute monarchy ended, but the hegemony was continued in the Constitution of Norway by paragraph 2: "The Evangelical-Lutheran religion remains the public religion of the state. The inhabitants who profess it are obliged to bring up their children in it." The provisions of paragraph 16 are a continuation of the line of the King's Act of 1665 and Christian V's Act of 1687: "The King shall arrange all public church and worship services, all meetings and assemblies on matters of religion, and shall order that the teachers of the religions follow the prescribed norms." It was further specified in paragraph 2, known as the Jew clause, that Jews, Jesuits and monastics were not allowed to enter the kingdom: "Jesuits and monastic orders are not to be tolerated. Jews are still excluded from admission to the kingdom." They would otherwise face the death penalty.

== Repeal of the Conventicle Act ==
By 1818 there was a proposal to give the Quakers limited rights to organize. This was because Norwegians who had been prisoners of war in England during the Napoleonic Wars had converted to Quakerism. The proposal was voted down in Parliament (Stortinget).

In 1833 a new proposal was advanced, this time for "the free exercise of religion by all Christian religious sects", by Søren Anton Wilhelm Sørenssen. The Faculty of Theology spoke out against it, and Parliament's Church Committee therefore did not promote the proposal before Parliament. But the proposal did lead to changes, as Parliament decided to lift the Conventicle Act and introduce freedom of assembly for members of the Norwegian Church. The government stopped it in 1836 and 1839, but when Parliament adopted it for the third time in 1842, it could no longer use its right to veto.

Because of the changes, the way was open to grant exemptions. The Quakers received their dispensation in 1842, and in 1843 the Catholic Church received permission to establish a congregation. Both permissions were granted with strict conditions and limitations. For example, they could not accept converts, but only serve foreigners and Norwegians who had converted abroad. Many of those who had fought the Conventicle Act stopped after the decision in 1842 because they feared further liberalization would betray the Protestant faith.

== The law ==
Despite the split, the Dissenter Act was passed in 1845. It gave the right to free and public exercise of faith for Christians outside the state church. Norwegians could leave the Norwegian Church and join another Christian denomination, as the general obligation to be a member of the state church was abolished. Some restrictions remained; dissenters did not have full civil rights, and they were imposed a number of special duties. However, compared to other Nordic countries, the law was comparatively liberal for the time – and a reason that exiled Swedish Baptist pastor Fredrik Olaus Nilsson considered settling in Norway.

The law was limited to Christian denominations, and the Jew clause thus remained. It would be another six years before it was repealed. The constitutional ban on Jesuits and monastic orders was also upheld; however, female Catholic orders were able to establish themselves in Norway.

In 1891 the law was changed, among other things by giving priests or pastors of dissenter churches the right to marry. In 1897 it was revised again, and the ban on monastic orders was lifted on the proposal of the first dissenter in Parliament, Baptist Hans Andersen Gulset.

In addition, there were other restrictions, such as the ban on teaching in schools and the religious requirement for officials, judges and state council members.

In 1969, the law was abolished, and the concept of dissenter disappeared from Norwegian law. At the same time, paragraph 2 of the Constitution was amended. The phrase "free exercise of religion for all" was changed to "full freedom of religion".

== See also ==
- Dissenter
- Freedom of religion in Norway
- Haugean movement
- Jesuit clause
- Dissenter Acts (Sweden)
