= Conventicle Act (Denmark–Norway) =

Danish–Norwegian law regarding religion

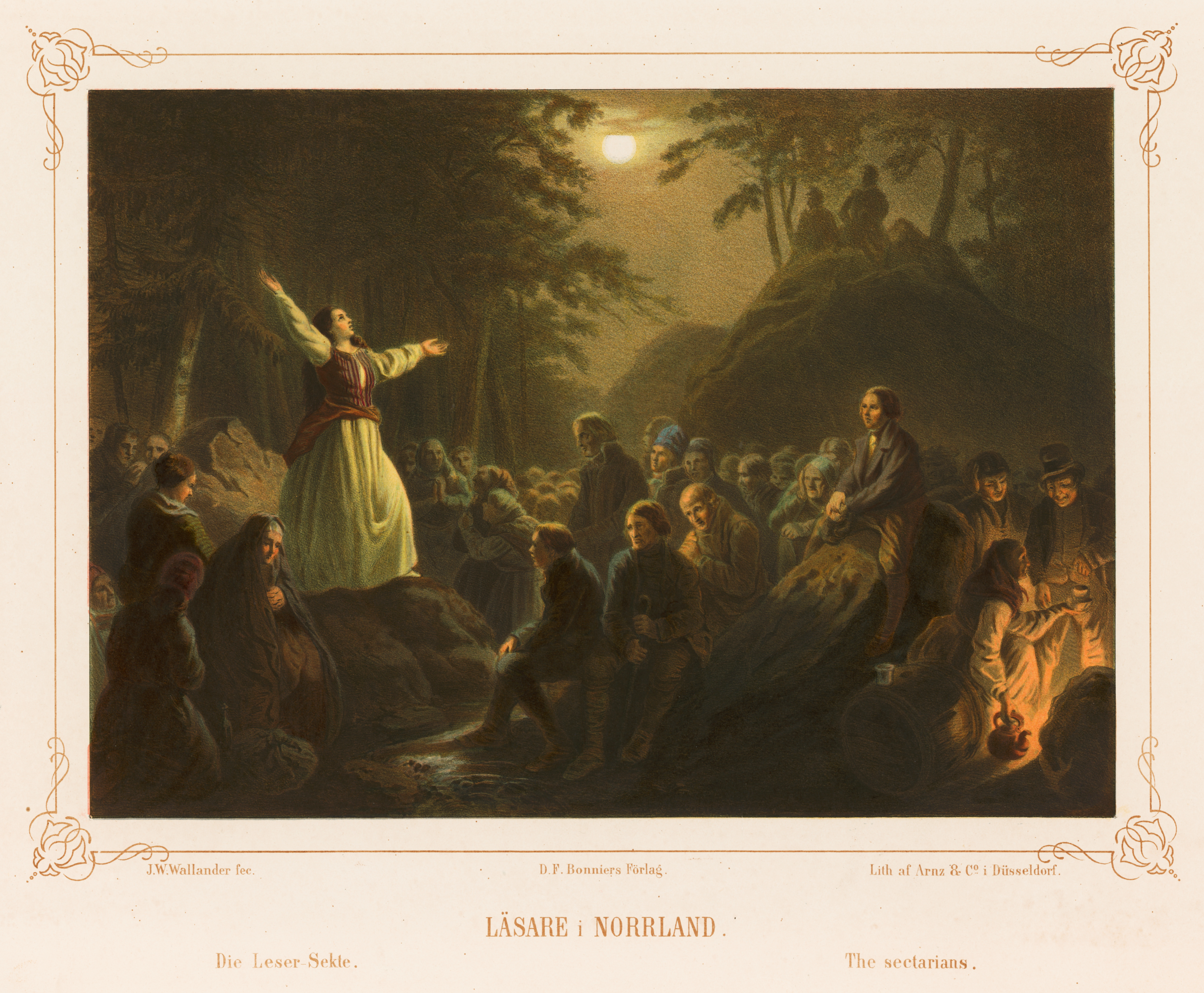
1855 depiction of a Läsare (Reader) woman preaching in a conventicle.

The Conventicle Act (Danish: Konventikelplakaten, Norwegian: Konventikkelplakaten) was a decree issued 13 January 1741 by King Christian VI of Denmark and Norway and forbade lay preachers from holding religious services – conventicles – without the approval of the local Lutheran priest. The law was repealed in 1839 (officially in 1848) in Denmark and 1842 in Norway, which lay the groundwork for freedom of assembly.

== Denmark ==
The decree had its roots in developments in the Danish part of Denmark-Norway. Pietism had started to become a strong movement in some circles, coming from Germany in 1703. Among the pietists, conventicles were a foundation of religious life, and prayer and Bible studies were led in the home by laypeople. Pietism put a heavy emphasis on individual faith, and in such a way that it could threaten the unity of the Danish state church. The Danish state in the 1700s broke with Pietism by incorporating it into the state religion. The branch of Pietism that was incorporated was August Hermann Francke's form of Pietism (Halle Pietism), which had a positive relationship with the state and church.

It turned out, however, that stricter legislation was needed to keep the more radical Pietists in check, and this led to the above-mentioned decree in 1741. Norway was then in union with Denmark, so the law also applied to Norwegians in Denmark.

The decree stated that only the parish priest could hold such meetings and speak at them. Of course, morning and evening devotions could be held in the family without the priest's participation, but others could not be invited to these devotions. One exception was small group meetings, where the Bible was briefly discussed. These gatherings, however, had to be approved by the local parish priest.

In Denmark, the decree was in practice overruled by Christian VIII in 1839 under the influence of the awakenings (religious gatherings), stating that priests should take a more moderate approach towards the groups. In 1848 it was officially repealed.

== Norway ==
The European Protestant movement came to Norway later than to Denmark, but there was influence from the end of the 18th century and the early 19th century.

After 1814, the Conventicle Act was retained as Norwegian law, even though the union with Denmark had been dissolved and Norway was in a union with Sweden. Preacher Hans Nielsen Hauge was particularly known for his disobedience towards and fight against the Conventicle Act. One scholar notes that the law "was not created to be used against Hauge, but it is almost only against Hauge that it was attempted to be used."

In 1833, jurist Søren Anton Wilhelm Sørenssen made a proposal to the Storting (parliament) that the Norwegian Constitution allow the freedom of religion. Three years later, Parliament tried to repeal the act at the proposals of three Haugean members, but was stopped by the government. Proposals were sent to the church committee, which was in agreement with the repeal; however, the Theological Faculty was against it. An attempt was again made in 1839, with Bishop Peter Olivarius Bugge, a supporter of the Pietists, being the only bishop to call for its repeal. Only in 1842, when the Parliament adopted the repeal for the third time, did the act pass. When the ordinance was repealed, it laid an essential foundation for freedom of assembly in Norway. In the next three years, dispensations were granted for the establishment of church congregations outside the state church. The Quakers received their dispensation in 1842 and the Catholic Church in 1843. In 1845 came the Dissenter Act which opened the way for all Christian groups to establish themselves in Norway. However, monastic orders would remained banned until 1897 and Jesuits until 1956. Other religions were allowed to organize after 1891.

== See also ==
- Conventicle Act (Sweden) – Sweden's law, which was somewhat older
- Conventicle Act 1664 – former English Act of Parliament
- Conventicle Act 1670 – former English Act of Parliament
- Free church
- Freedom of religion in Norway
- Jesuit clause
- Jew clause
