= Jesuit clause =

Clause of the Constitution of Norway from 1814 to 1956

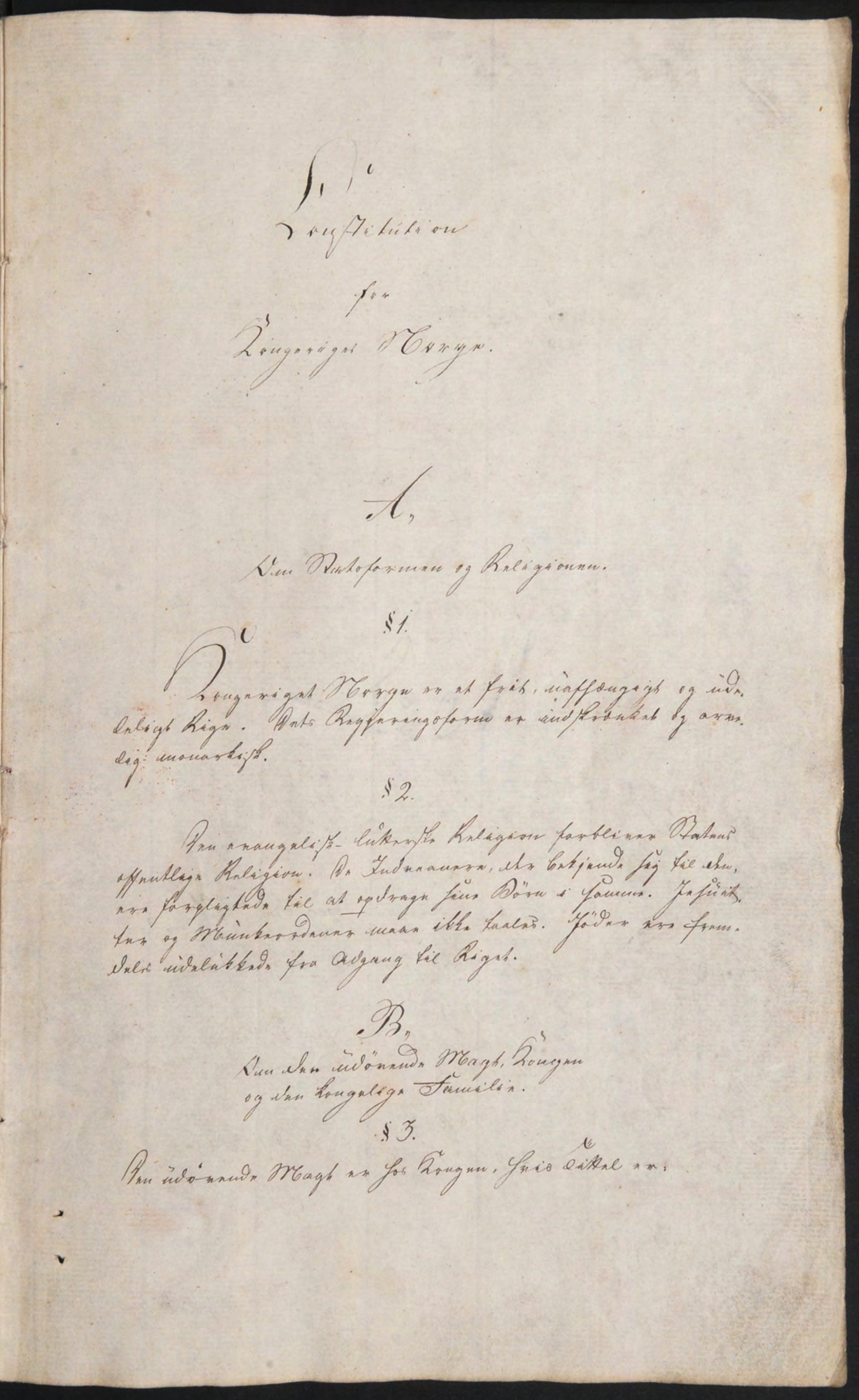
Original from 1814, with paragraph 2

Jesuit emblem. The Jesuits are a Catholic order founded in 1534 by Ignatius of Loyola and confirmed by the Pope in 1540. The Greek letters IHS stand for Jesus, or can be interpreted as an abbreviation for "Jesus, the Savior of men" in Latin.

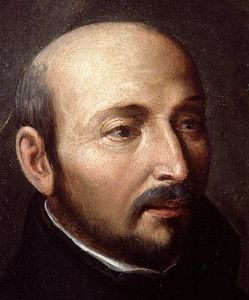
Ignatius of Loyola (1491–1556), Spanish nobleman, priest and founder of the Order of Jesuits.

The Jesuit clause (Norwegian: Jesuittparagrafen) was a provision in the Constitution of Norway, paragraph 2, in force from 1814 to 1956, that denied Jesuits entry into the country. Until 1897, this provision was combined with a ban on monastic orders, and until 1851 a ban on Jews, the so-called Jew clause.

The second paragraph of the Constitution originally reads:

Den evangelisk-lutherske Religion forbliver Statens offentlige Religion. De Indvaanere, der bekjende sig til den, ere forpligtede til at opdrage sine Børn i samme. Jesuitter og Munkeordener maae ikke taales. Jøder ere fremdeles udelukkede fra Adgang til Riget.

Translation:

The Evangelical-Lutheran religion remains the public religion of the State. The inhabitants who profess it are obliged to educate their children in the same. Jesuits and monastic orders are not to be tolerated. Jews are still excluded from admission to the kingdom.

Historian Bernt T. Oftestad has often interpreted the ban as an expression of Norwegian anti-Catholicism. Catholicism was banned in Norway until 1845, when the Dissenter Act was passed and Catholic worship was allowed in Norway, although monks continued to be banned from entering the country. As early as 1624, Norway had prohibited Catholic priests from staying in the country, under threat of the death penalty.

Restrictions on Catholic worship were gradually reduced from 1845, but the ban on Jesuits was not lifted until Norway ratified the 1950 European Convention on Human Rights in 1956. In both 1897 and 1925, proposals to lift the ban on Jesuits were discussed and voted on, but failed to gain a supermajority in 1897, and only gained the support of a minority in 1925. Thus, this provision became the last important express legal restriction on religious presence and practice in Norway.

== Background ==
=== Jesuits ===
The Jesuit order was founded during the Reformation in Europe with the aim of reforming the Catholic Church from within. The order does not have monasteries in the usual sense, although monks who are in the same place must live together. The monks do not wear their own habit and are not bound to a place, unlike for example the Benedictine order, but are sent out by the order. The Jesuit order played a decisive role during the Counter-Reformation and in Catholic missions. For a time, it was a powerful organization within the Catholic Church. The Jesuits have fostered both missions and the establishment of educational institutions, and established a number of universities in Europe. Their missionary activity and sometimes elitist and offensive style has led to strong backlash and criticism over time, as well as the emergence of both suspicion and a number of myths associated with the order and their activities. Within Catholic circles as well, such as Jansenism and philosopher Blaise Pascal, attacks have been made on the Jesuits.

=== Views on the Jesuits ===
During the 1956 parliamentary debate on the repeal of the clause, the order was accused of being behind the Spanish Civil War and of inspiring Communists and Marxists by the then-president of the Odelsting, C. J. Hambro:

It must be remembered that neither Nazism in Germany, Fascism in Italy, Rexism in Belgium led by Degrelle, the Catholics' favorite disciple, Petain's movement in France, Franco's movement in Spain would have been possible without the support and active collaboration of the Jesuits. Those who have retained any impression of Hitler's Mein Kampf will also have a strong impression of how much he had learned from Jesuitism, and how highly he valued its organization and its teachings. There are few things he has expressed more directly.

— C. J. Hambro

Critics of Jesuitism often sustained that the members of the order followed the Pope blindly and that the order followed a moral theology which justified both lying and deceit as long as the ends were good, and were for that reason given the motto "The end justifies the means". Similar ideas about the Jesuits were also common in Norway in the 20th century.

=== Before 1814 ===
As the Jesuit schools and universities grew in reputation, it also became common for wealthy Norwegian official families to send their children there for the best education: in Rome, but also later in Belgium, Poland and elsewhere. For Norwegian students, the school in Braniewo on the Baltic Sea was particularly attractive. The students went to Jesuit schools, and many received tuition free. They had to attend Catholic masses, confessions and Catholic Eucharist. Many of the students converted to Catholicism, the best known being Laurentius Nicolai. The schools also gained a good reputation, with good teaching staff and pedagogically recognized methods. The education was practical and results-oriented. The schools provided education in various disciplines, such as literature, music, drama and mathematics. Several of these began missionary work in the Nordic countries, starting in Poland and Belgium. There were also some Catholics in Norway who more or less hid their faith, among them Laurits Clausen Scabo who was bishop of Stavanger and Christoffer Hjort who was headmaster at Oslo Cathedral School. In 1602, the Catholics in Norway had their own clergy for a period.

In 1604, the situation for Catholics worsened. It was then forbidden to employ anyone who had attended Jesuit schools in positions in schools and churches. In practice, students from Norway ended up no longer attending Jesuit schools, and much of the contact with Catholic countries disappeared. In 1623–1624 the Jesuits made a new missions attempt. As a result, in 1624, Catholic priests were banned from Denmark–Norway under threat of the death penalty.

But around the mid-1600s, the Catholic Church largely abandoned its missionary activities in Norway, and most active attempts to re-Catholicize Denmark–Norway ceased.

=== Work on the Constitution ===
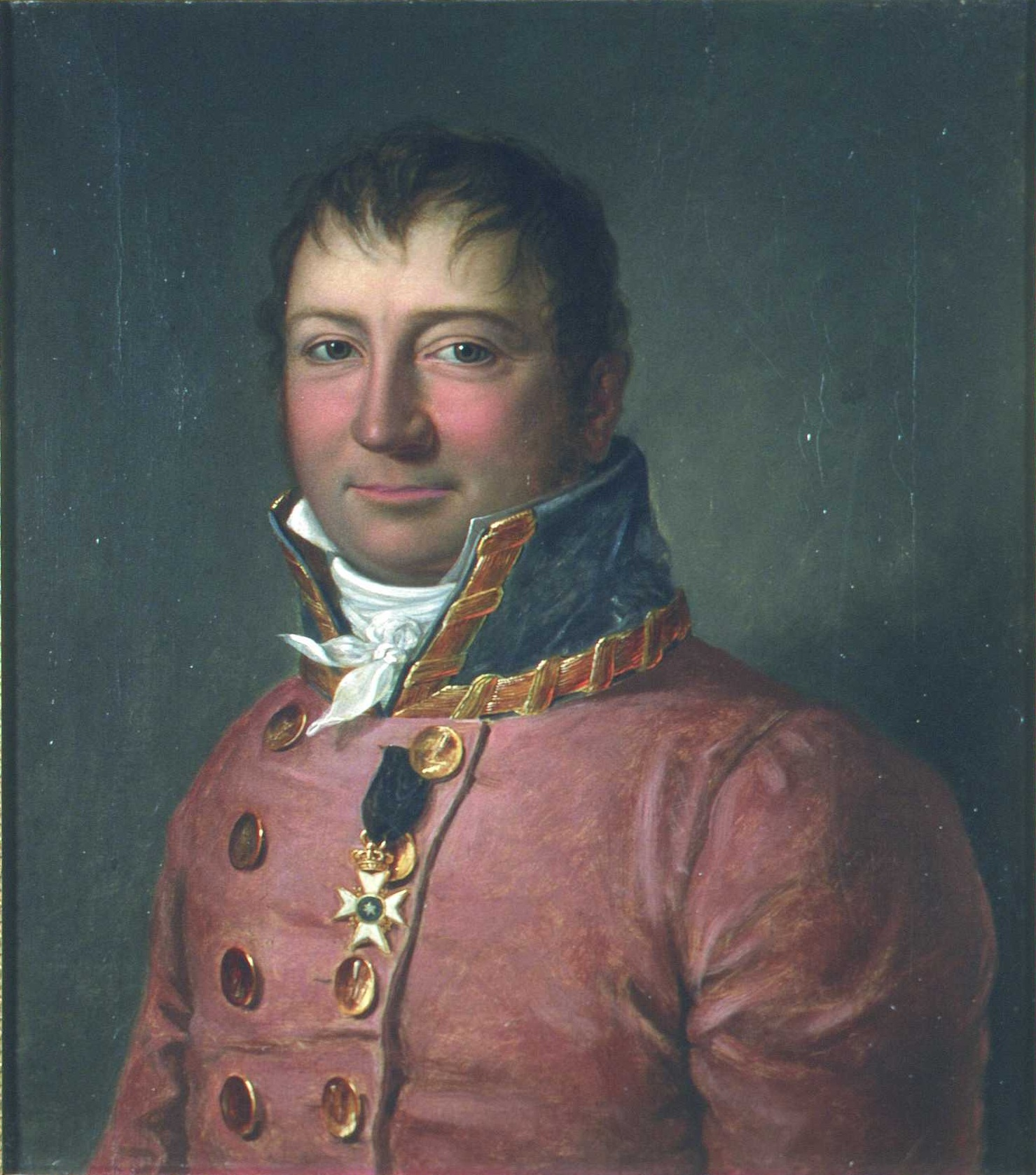
Wilhelm Frimann Koren Christie proposed the restrictions on religious freedom in the Constitution through a proposal he submitted on 4 May 1814

The first drafts of the Constitution did not mention Jesuits, but the ban on Jews was there from the beginning. A draft from 16 April reads:

Alle Religions - Secter tilstedes fri Religionsøvelse, dog ere Jøder fremdeles udelukkede fra Adgang til Riget.

Translation:

All religious sects are allowed free exercise of religion, though Jews are still excluded from admission to the kingdom.

Around 20 drafts of a new constitution were prepared, in 15 of which religious practice was regulated and only one had full freedom of religion. The tendency of the proposal was to allow non-Lutheran Christian denominations, but forbid their public practice. Eleven of the 15 proposals stated that the Evangelical Lutheran faith should be the public religion, seven stated that the king should profess this faith, one stated that the government should profess this faith, and one applied the requirement to all officials. Pope Clement XIV disbanded the Jesuit order in 1773 and the order was not active while work on the Constitution was ongoing.

On 4 May, a total of 20 paragraphs were adopted, but on the same day there was a new debate on paragraph 2, on freedom of religion. Wilhelm Frimann Koren Christie had promoted the draft, and thought that the exclusion of Jesuits and "monastic orders" should also be added to paragraph 2, something that had not been included in the drafts until then. Christie's proposal was divided into four parts:

1. Jews and Jesuits were to be excluded from the kingdom
2. Monastic orders should not be tolerated
3. The inhabitants of the country should profess the religion of the state
4. The inhabitants should be obliged to educate their children in the public religion

A few priests argued against it and for religious tolerance. Then the question of the Jews was brought up again. Priest Peter Ulrik Magnus Hount tried in vain to argue that the provision to test the Jews was

"Disgustingly intolerant. Jews are human beings. If other nations acted as we do, the Jews would have no place to live, and yet they should be allowed to live somewhere on God's green earth."

Provost Hans Christian Ulrik Midelfart also spoke against the proposal which he called a manifestation of unchristian intolerance. Christie, however, said that Jesuits could pose a threat to the country and that other "sects" could also be harmful.

It turned out as Christie wanted, and 94 of 110 representatives at the Constituent Assembly in Eidsvoll voted for the proposal, but it then had a provision that there should in principle be free exercise of religion, a point that fell out in the editorial committee, consisting of Christian Adolph Diriks, Lauritz Weidemann and Georg Sverdrup while Nicolai Wergeland stood for full religious freedom in this case. But the battle was not over religious tolerance, even in paragraph 15, which stipulated that the regent should "always" profess the Evangelical Lutheran religion. This wording was important because Charles III Johan had been a confessing Catholic until 1810. The Independence Party (Selvstendighetspartiet) was thus given the opportunity to make a strict confession to the Lutheran religion in an attempt to exclude the Swedish heir to the throne as future Norwegian king.

== Debate on repeal ==
In the debates on the repeal of the Jesuit clause, the counter-arguments went along two lines: one was that Jesuits being allowed entry could represent a threat to the country, and a constitutionally conservative line that the constitution should not be changed unless there was a need for change, and that this provision was in effect a dormant provision, since no Jesuits had been stopped at the border.

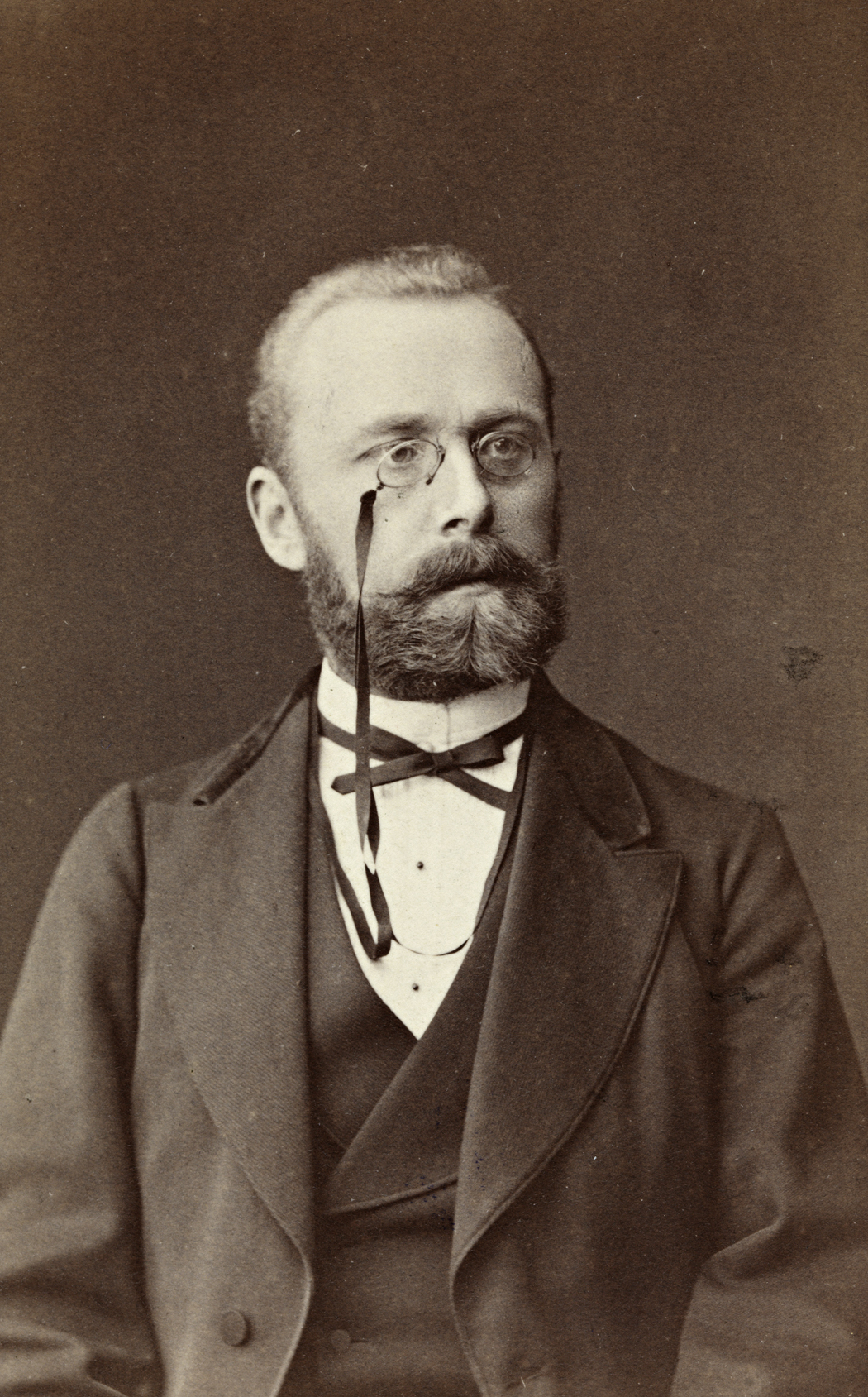
Viggo Ullmann promoted the proposal to remove the Jesuit provisions in 1897.

The arguments for repeal were primarily based on principles of religious and spiritual freedom, and that the provisions were not worthy of a modern democracy.

The weight of these different arguments was, however, somewhat different on the three occasions, the fear of the alleged harmful effect of the Jesuits on the country being greatest in the discussion of 1925.

=== 1897 ===
At the request of Norwegian Catholics, a final amendment to the Constitution was delivered in 1892 to repeal the Jesuit clause, and they called on Viggo Ullmann of the Liberal Party to promote it. The proposal came up for debate on 10 May 1897, along with two other proposals.

Ullmann's proposal struck down the ban on Jesuits and monastic orders, but the Jesuit ban was added when the proposal was supported by Ullmann's party colleagues Thomas Georg Münster and Hans Jacob Horst. Another proposal was promoted by Hans Andersen from the Conservative Party, where the Jesuit and monastic order ban was removed and full religious practice was allowed "within the boundaries of law and virtuousness". A third proposal was promoted by Liberals Ole Olsen Five and Johannes Okkenhaug which would retain the ban on Jesuits and monastic orders, and add a ban on Freemasons.

The debate was dominated by the practical meaning of these prohibitions. At that time, it was only the Jesuit ban that had criminal law, where a Jesuit who was discovered in Norway could be sentenced to lifelong forced labor. This was therefore interpreted to mean that there was actually no prohibition on other members of monastic orders staying in Norway, but only a prohibition on establishing orders in the country. It was further discussed whether there was a need for the amendment according to the requirements in paragraph 112. As there had been no unfortunate experiences with the Jesuit ban, it was argued that there was no reason to remove it. It was also pointed out in the debate that other countries had had similar bans on Jesuits, but had removed them.

The result of the debate was that the ban on monastic orders was removed as there was still no possibility of sanction or leverage, while the Jesuit ban was maintained. However, the proposal to remove the Jesuit ban received a majority, 63 in favor and 43 against, but not the supermajority of 2/3.

=== 1925 ===
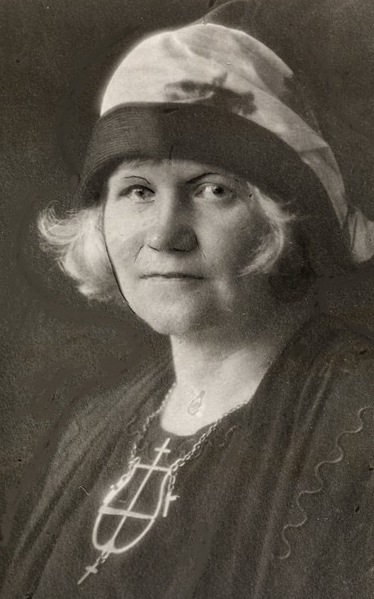
Marta Steinsvik was one of several spokespeople for those who strongly opposed the repeal of the Jesuit clause in 1925

The government promoted proposals to the Storting (Parliament) to remove the Jesuit provision in a proposition dated 23 November 1923, reported in the Storting meeting of 29 November. At that time there was a more positive attitude to the bill, but by the time it came up for consideration in 1925 the mood had changed, particularly within Christian circles in the country. The Faculty of Theology at MF Norwegian School of Theology, the country's bishops and the Association of Priests of the Church of Norway spoke out against lifting the Jesuit ban. There was also debate among the general public, with Marta Steinsvik and Luthersk Kirketidende in particular opposing the lifting of the ban, while church historian Oluf Kolsrud and composer and author Gerhard Schjelderup wanted the Jesuit ban removed. Steinsvik traveled the country with the lecture "In the Mother Church's Embrace" and through a series of articles in Aftenposten in 1925, strongly advocated against the Catholic Church and the repeal of the Jesuit clause.

The debate in Parliament showed that it wanted to respect the wishes of the Church in the matter. This time the Jesuit ban was discussed alone, unlike in 1897. It was argued this time that the provision was now a "dead paragraph", as the previous penal provisions had been removed. But unlike in 1897, the proposal was voted down this time, with 99 voting against and just 33 voting in favor.

=== 1956 ===
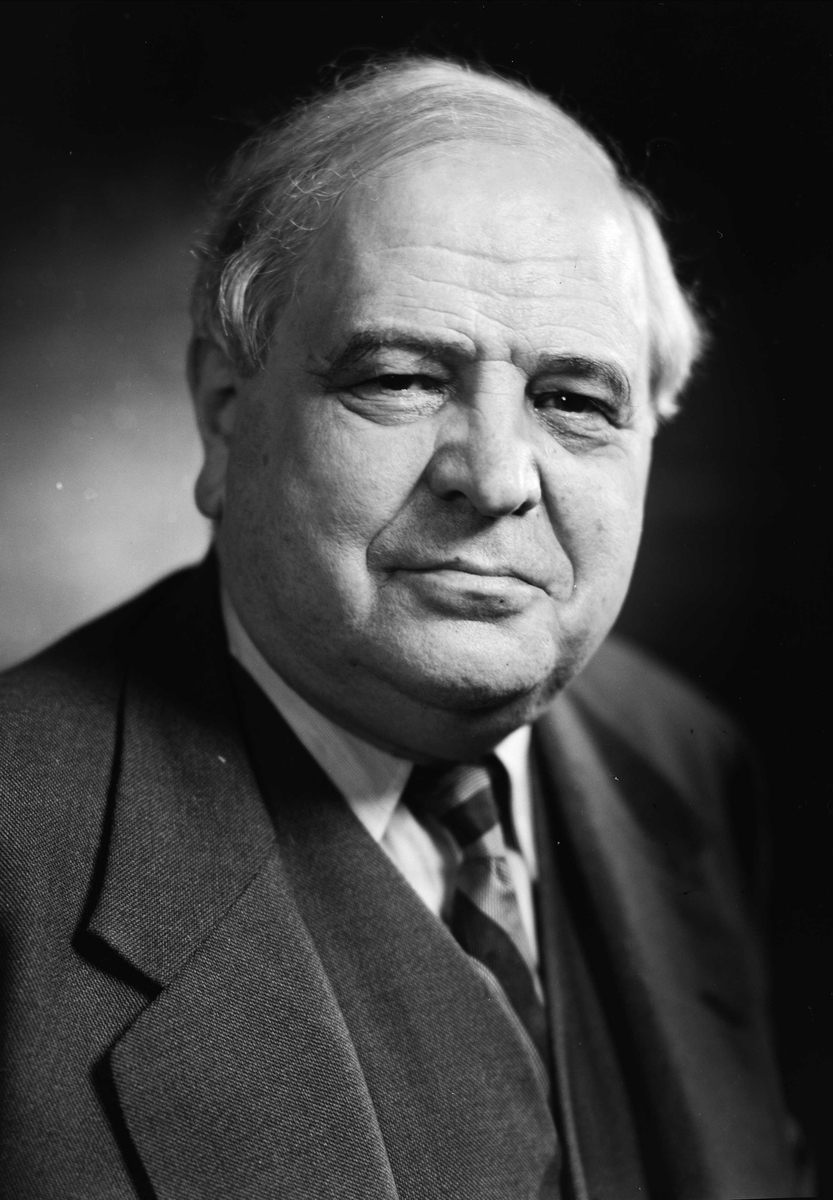
C. J. Hambro, who himself had a Jewish background, opposed the repeal of the Jesuit clause

The Jesuit clause created difficulties for Norway in international cooperation. The matter came up again in Parliament in connection with Norway's ratification of the European Convention on Human Rights of 4 November 1950. Also, the UN Universal Declaration of Human Rights from 1948 was withdrawn. The government therefore promoted through proposition number 202, 1952, a proposal for a constitutional amendment, which was referred to the Parliament on 10 January 1953. Ole Hallesby and other professors at the Faculty of Theology did not want the Jesuits in the country because they would be morally destructive, among other things, due to the Jesuits' teachings defending lies. Theologian Olav Valen-Sendstad also strongly opposed the repeal of the clause.

During the parliamentary debate on 1 November 1956, the President of the Odelsting C. J. Hambro was deeply concerned about the future of Norway if the Jesuits were allowed to enter the country: "I look with the utmost fear for the future of our people at any move against the state church". From the podium he also made an attack on professor of church history Einar Molland, who in November 1955 had been asked by the head of the Standing Committee on Scrutiny and Constitutional Affairs, Erling Wikborg, to make a statement on the Jesuit Order, Hambro questioning Molland's authority in the matter.

Hambro stood together with Lars Elisæus Vatnaland (Farmers' Party) and Erling Wikborg (Christian Democratic Party) as opponents of the lifting of the Jesuit clause. Hambro believed that the Jesuits had been a contributor to the rise of fascism and Nazism in the interwar period, and also an inspiration for communists and Marxists. Kjell Bondevik also spoke out against the repeal and warned against letting the order into the country.

Opposition was strong in some Christian circles, with theologian Olav Valen-Sendstad as a key spokesman, who among other things wrote the publication Åpent brev til Norges storting 1954 : vil stortinget gi jesuitt-fascicmen sin moralske anerkjennelse? ('Open letter to the Norwegian Parliament 1954: will the parliament give Jesuit fascism its moral recognition?')

When the matter came to a vote in Parliament, the repeal received a large majority, 111 votes to 31. All 14 Christian Democratic Party representatives voted against, and Hambro was in the minority, along with five of the 27 representatives from the Conservatives.

== Later sections on religious freedom ==
In 1964, paragraph 2 was amended again, this time by adding the right to free exercise of religion. The paragraph reads:

Alle Indvaanere av Riget have fri Religionsøvelse. Den evangelisk-lutherske Religion forbliver Statens offentlige Religion. De Indvaanere, der bekjende seg til den, ere forpligtede til at opdrage sine Børn i samme.

Translation:

All inhabitants of the kingdom shall have free exercise of religion. The Evangelical-Lutheran religion shall remain the public religion of the State. The inhabitants who profess it are obliged to educate their children in the same.

On 21 May 2012, the paragraph was amended again by removing the reference to the state's public religion, and the amended paragraph § 2 reads:

Værdigrundlaget forbliver vor kristne og humanistiske Arv. Denne Grundlov skal sikre Demokrati, Retsstat og Menneskerettighederne.

Translation:

Our values remain our Christian and humanist heritage. This Constitution shall guarantee democracy, the rule of law and human rights.

The provision on freedom of religion was moved to § 16:

Alle Indvaanere af Riget have fri Religionsøvelse. Den norske Kirke, en evangelisk-luthersk kirke, forbliver Norges Folkekirke og understøttes som saadan af Staten. Nærmere Bestemmelser om dens Ordning fastsættes ved Lov. Alle Tros- og Livssynssamfund skal understøttes paa lige Linje.

Translation:

All inhabitants of the kingdom shall have free exercise of religion. The Norwegian Church, an Evangelical Lutheran Church, remains the People's Church of Norway and is supported as such by the State. The details of its organization shall be determined by law. All faith and philosophical communities shall be supported on an equal basis.

== See also ==
- Anti-Catholicism in Norway
- Conventicle Act (Denmark–Norway)
- Dissenter Act (Norway)
- Freedom of religion in Norway
- Religion in Norway
- Jesuit Law (German)
