= Freedom of religion in Norway =

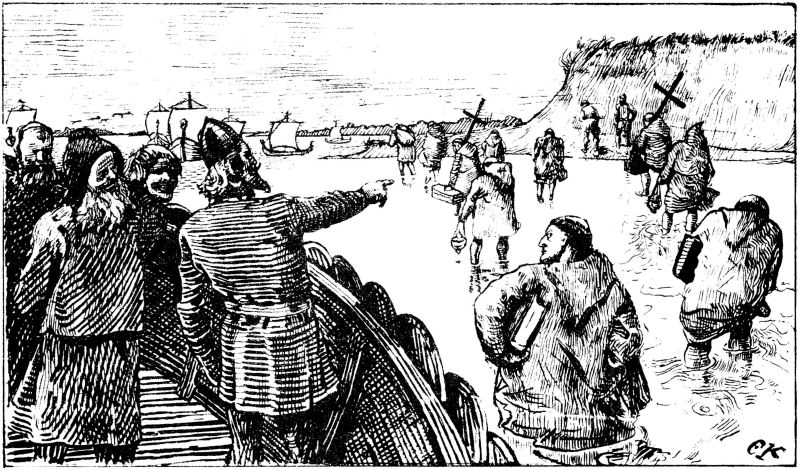
A drawing from the 1890s depicting 10th century ruler Haakon the Good commanding Christian clergy

While the constitution of Norway establishes that the King of Norway must be Evangelical Lutheran, it also establishes that all individuals have the right to exercise their religion. The government's policies generally support the free practice of religion in the country, and it provides funding to religious organizations and anti-discrimination programs on a regular basis. According to non-governmental organizations (NGOs) and the Norwegian police, religiously motivated hate speech is prevalent, particularly online, and primarily targeting the Muslim and Jewish communities.

The origins of the modern Kingdom of Norway can be traced to the kingdoms established by Vikings during the Middle Ages. During this period, Norwegian kings such as Olaf II of Norway converted to Christianity, and propagated it within their kingdoms to reify their authority. Accounts from this time period include graphic descriptions of gruesome torture perpetrated against pagans who refused to convert. The Catholic Church in Norway was replaced by Evangelical Lutheranism during the Reformation in the 16th century, and non-Protestants were persecuted. From the 16th to 19th centuries, Norway (under either a Danish or Swedish crown) forced the Sámi people of northeastern Scandinavia to convert to Christianity, suppressing and eventually all but eradicating their indigenous religion. Jews were at times tolerated in Norway, but in 1814 a new constitution banned Jews from the country––this provision was reversed in 1851, and by the end of the 19th century Norway would be home to a few thousand Jews. This population was devastated in the 1940s during the German occupation of Norway as part of World War II and the Holocaust. Toward the end of the 20th century and in the 21st, the Norwegian government has adopted some constitutional reforms to recognize the traditions of the Sámi people, to establish a separation between church and state, and to provide financial restitution for the Jewish community, but it has also imposed religious clothing bans targeting Muslim women.

In 2023, the country was scored 4 out of 4 for religious freedom.

== Demographics ==
According to Statistics Norway, as of 2019, 70 percent of the population belonged to the Church of Norway, an Evangelical Lutheran church, which comprises a decline of 3 percent over the three prior years. 6.7 percent of the population belong to other Christian denominations, of which the Roman Catholic Church is the largest, with 3 percent of the population. Muslims comprise 3.2 percent of the population. Pentecostals, Buddhists, Sikhs, Hindus, and Jews each make up less than 1 percent of the population. 1.8 percent of the population participates in life-stance organizations (nonreligious or philosophical communities with organizational ethics based on humanist values), with the Norwegian Humanist Association being the largest.

Immigrants comprise the majority of members of religious groups outside the Church of Norway. Immigrants from Poland and the Philippines have increased the number of Catholics, while those from such countries as Syria, Iraq, Afghanistan, and Somalia have increased the size of the Muslim community. Catholics and Muslims generally have greater representation in cities than in rural areas. Muslims are located throughout the country, with the population concentrated in the Oslo region. Many recent immigrants from Muslim majority countries still reside in asylum reception centers. According to Norwegian Directorate of Immigration statistics, approximately 5,600 of the 6,300 persons residing in reception centers as of October 2017 come from Muslim majority countries.

== History ==
=== Unification and Christianization of the Kingdom of Norway (10th c. CE – 1103) ===
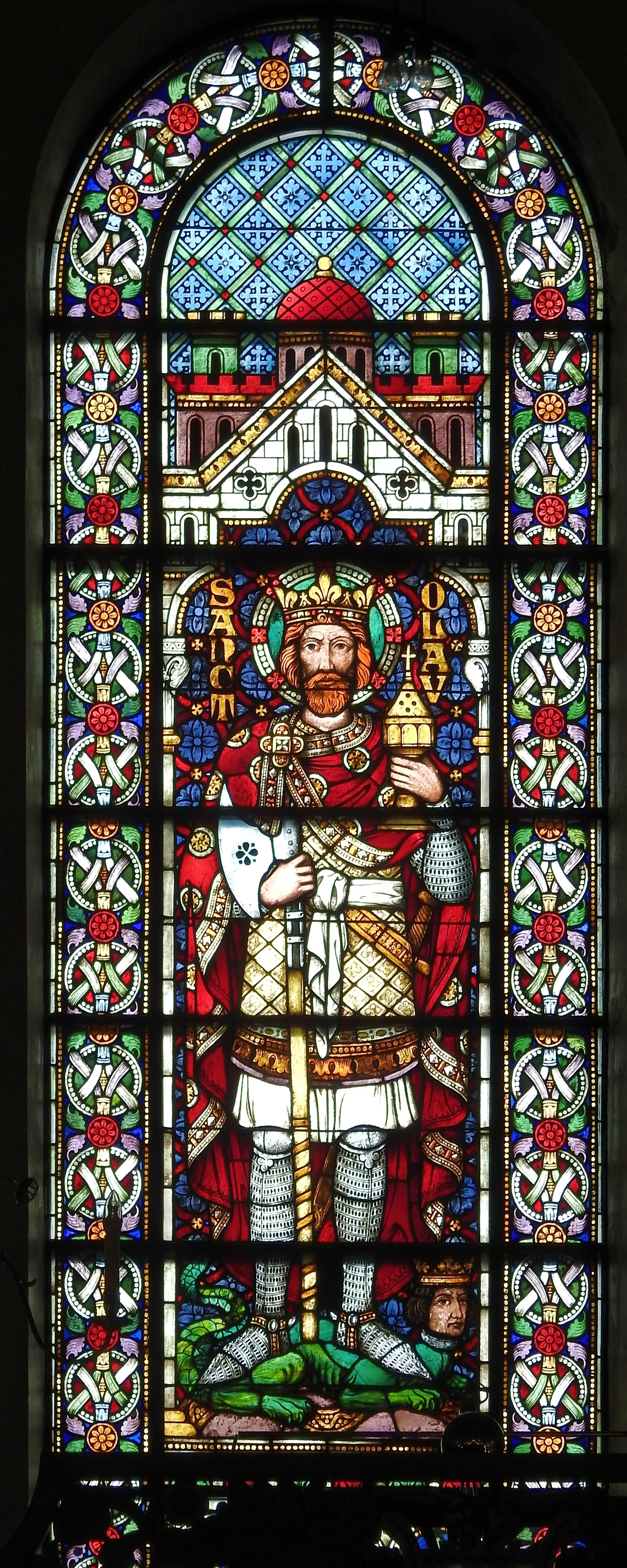
A depiction of Olaf II in a church in Ålesund, Norway

While a unified Kingdom of Norway was first created by the pseudo-mythical Harald Fairhair in the 9th or 10th century, Norway's unity was short-lived in this era, and the foundation of the modern state of Norway is identified as having been the product of Viking leaders such as Olaf Tryggvason, Olaf Haraldson, and Harald Hardrada. The wealth accrued by these rulers in raids against the British Isles and other targets greatly expanded the power of the Norwegian ruling class and allowed for the establishment of a unified kingdom in Norway. While Christianity had been present in Norway dating back at least to the rule of Haakon the Good (c. 920–961), the first king to attempt to convert Norway to Christianity, successful attempts to formally incorporate Norway as a Christian kingdom and the complete conversion of its population did not occur until the 1000s at the earliest. Accounts from this time period are not entirely reliable, but certain details are consistent. Olaf Tryggvason is recorded in posthumous, sympathetic accounts as having forced pagan nobles to convert on pain of gruesome torture or death; less sympathetic accounts do not include attestations of torture, which may suggest that extreme violence in the service of religious conversion was viewed as a positive trait by such sources. It is theorized that a primary motivation for the promotion of Christianity by Norway's early kings was to use Christianity as a justification for their centralized, hierarchical rule, establishing a centralized Christian monarchy justified by divine right to replace the older, pagan power structure of charismatic authority.

==== Reign of Olaf Haraldson (1015–1028) ====
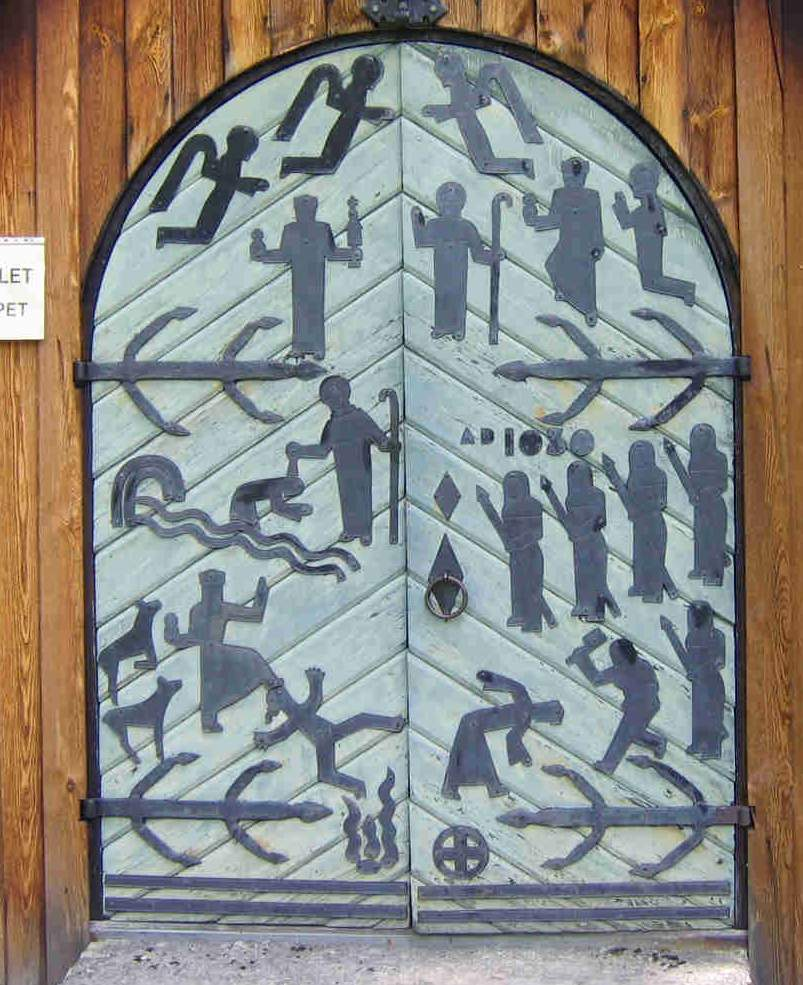
The door of a church in Närke, Sweden, depicting vignettes from Olaf II's life

Traditional Norwegian historiography credits Olaf Haraldson as the leader of the Christianization of Norway, and he was consequently canonized as a saint. More recent historical research throws doubt on this narrative, suggesting that many of the milestones of Christianization (as well as accounts of saintly miracles) associated with Haraldson's rule were attributed to him posthumously. Some scholars have cast doubt on the sincerity of Haraldson's Christianity, suggesting instead that Christianity was established in Norway (as well as the rest of Scandinavia) through a long process of slow assimilation of individual Christian practices, rather than sudden mass conversions from paganism.

==== North Sea Empire (1028–1047) ====
King Cnut the Great, who ruled Norway as well as England and Denmark in what is known as the North Sea Empire, went to great lengths to improve his realm's relations with the Catholic Church and European Christian kingdoms. However, it is unclear the extent to which this was motivated by religious zeal, as opposed to political pragmatism. In addition to his extensive support for the Church, he also held respect for pagan traditions in his empire.

==== Harald Hardrada (1046–1066) ====
Following the death of Magnus the Good, Norway was once again a unitary kingdom, ruled by Harald Hardrada. Hardrada cultivated a public reputation as a supporter of the Catholic Church, and advanced the propagation of Christianity in Norway through the construction of many new churches. Unlike his predecessors, who primarily propagated Christianity by importing clergy from Western Europe, Hardrada sought out clergy from the Kievan Rus' and the Byzantine Empire. Representatives of the Catholic Church raised protest in response to these appointments, and Hardrada responded by throwing all Catholic clergy out of his court, reportedly declaring himself to be a higher authority than any religious representative in Norway. Such actions have been characterized by scholars as being similar to those of Byzantine rulers, and are attributed to his experiences there in the Varangian Guard.

==== Adoption of Catholic Church norms (1067–1103) ====
The rift with the Catholic Church established by Hardrada was mended by Olaf III, who recognized the religious authority of the Archbishopric of Bremen over Norway. Olaf III's reign would also focus on the expansion of the organizational structure of the Catholic Church in Norway. His successor, Magnus Barefoot, would continue to expand the church's organization, and brought the Norwegian Kingdom's relationship with the Church to be more in line with the model espoused by other Catholic European kingdoms. Magnus retained de facto authority over the church in Norway.

=== Medieval Norway (1103–1523) ===
==== The Norwegian and Swedish Crusade (1103–1130) ====
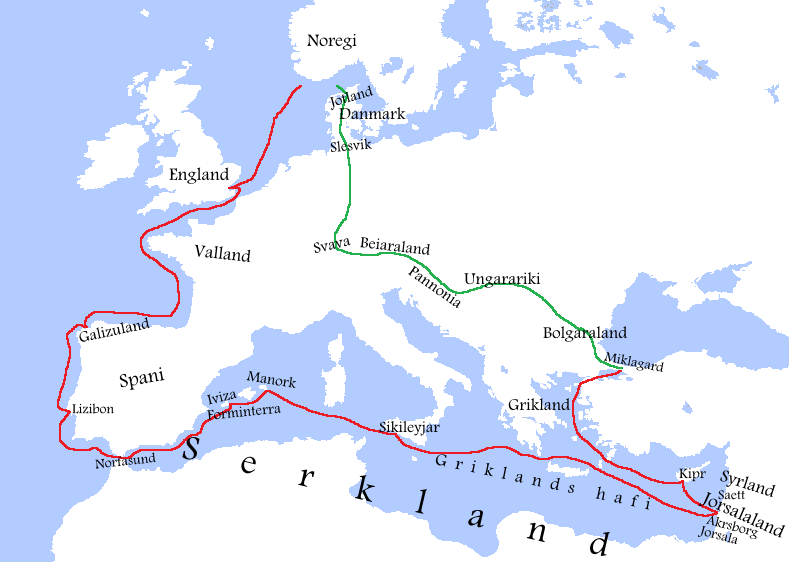
Map depicting the routes taken by Sigurd's crusade

Following the death of Magnus Barefoot, Norway was ruled jointly by his sons, Sigurd and Eystein (a third son, Olav Magnusson, died before adulthood). Sigurd became the first European king to lead a crusade, departing for Palestine in the Norwegian Crusade in 1103 to support the Kingdom of Jerusalem and returning to Norway in 1111. In 1123, Sigurd led the Kalmare ledung, a crusade to Christianize the Swedish province of Småland by force. Eystein primarily directed domestic affairs, and continued to expand church infrastructure in Norway, as well as establishing the practice of church tithe.

==== Civil war, High Middle Ages, Black Death, and Kalmar Union (1130–1523) ====
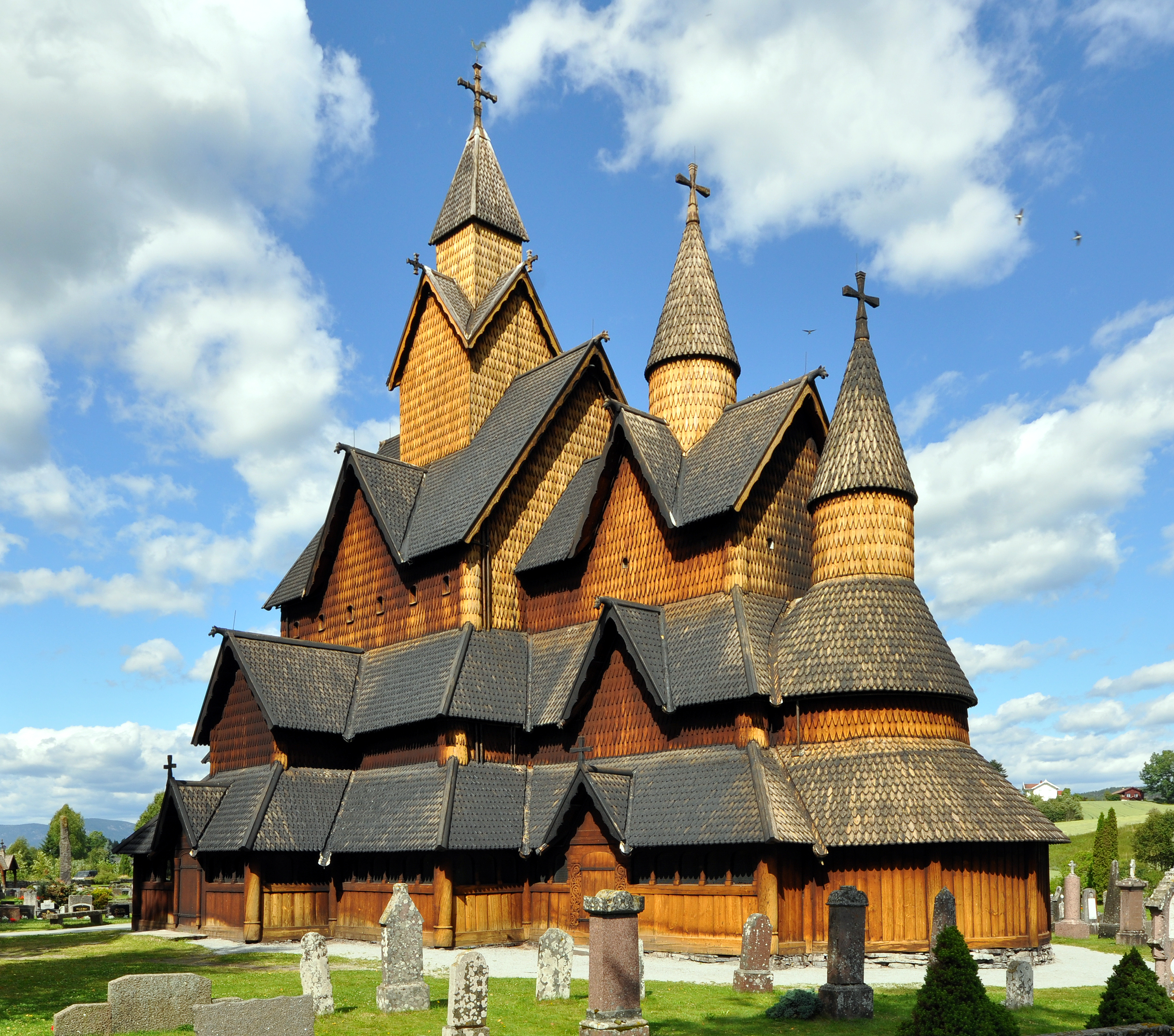
The Heddal Stave Church, the largest stave church in Norway, was built in the early 13th century.

From 1130 to 1217, Norway suffered a period of on-and-off civil war. While the most immediate cause of these conflicts was a lack of clarity in Norwegian succession laws, the Church would eventually come to be an important power broker in the conflict, taking sides in an attempt to increase its influence over the monarchy. This period of instability ended in 1217 with the appointment of Haakon IV of Norway, who eventually reached a compromise with the Church in which the Church recognized his authority and allowed him to deviate from Catholic succession practices, while Haakon granted the church significant autonomy over its internal affairs and over rural society. During Haakon's reign, pagan Karelian tribes were forced to enter Norway due to the Mongolian invasion of their own lands. Haakon allowed the Karelians to settle in the lands surrounding the Malangen fjord on the condition that they converted to Christianity.

During the reign of Magnus VI, Norway's laws were further reformed. Despite the king's personal piety, such reforms brought him in conflict with the Church. The Tønsberg Concord of 1277 established a compromise, retaining certain privileges for the Church, while forcing the Church to renounce its claim that the Kingdom of Norway was a fiefdom of the Church.

In 1349, the Black Death reached Norway, killing a third of its population within a year. This sudden demographic change depleted the tax base of Norway's aristocracy, consequently making the Church increasingly powerful. Such gains by the Church were later reversed by Margaret I during her rule over the Kalmar Union, which combined the crowns of Denmark, Sweden, and Norway.

In 1436 and 1438, archbishop Aslak Bolt prohibited celebrating a day of rest on Saturday, lest Christians replicate the "way of Jews", and this prohibition was reinforced through several subsequent ordinances, including those in Diplomatarium Norvegicum. However, there is no evidence that any Jews actually lived in Norway at this time.

=== Protestant Reformation and Danish rule (1523–1814) ===
In 1523, Sweden withdrew from the Kalmar Union, thus creating Denmark–Norway. Frederick I of Denmark favored Martin Luther's Reformation, but it was not popular in Norway, where the Church was the primary national institution and the country was too poor for the clergy to exhibit the decadence associated with the Church's corruption. Frederick supported a variety of reforms which reduced the influence of the Catholic Church, in favor of expanding Lutheran practice and increasing crown authority over religion. Norwegian resistance was led by Olav Engelbrektsson, Archbishop of Trondheim, who invited the old king Christian II back from his exile in The Netherlands. Christian returned but he and his army were defeated and Christian spent the rest of his life in prison. When Frederick died, a three-way war of succession broke out between the supporters of his eldest son Christian III, his younger Catholic brother Hans and the followers of Christian II. Olaf Engelbrektsson again tried to lead a Catholic Norwegian resistance movement. Christian III triumphed and Engelbrektsson went into exile. In 1536/1537 Christian demoted Norway from its official status as an independent kingdom to being a junior partner to Denmark.

The Reformation was imposed in 1537, establishing Lutheranism as the state religion of Denmark–Norway. Catholic priests and bishops were persecuted, monastic orders were suppressed, and the crown took over church property, while some churches were plundered and abandoned, even destroyed. Bishops (initially called superintendents) were appointed by the king.

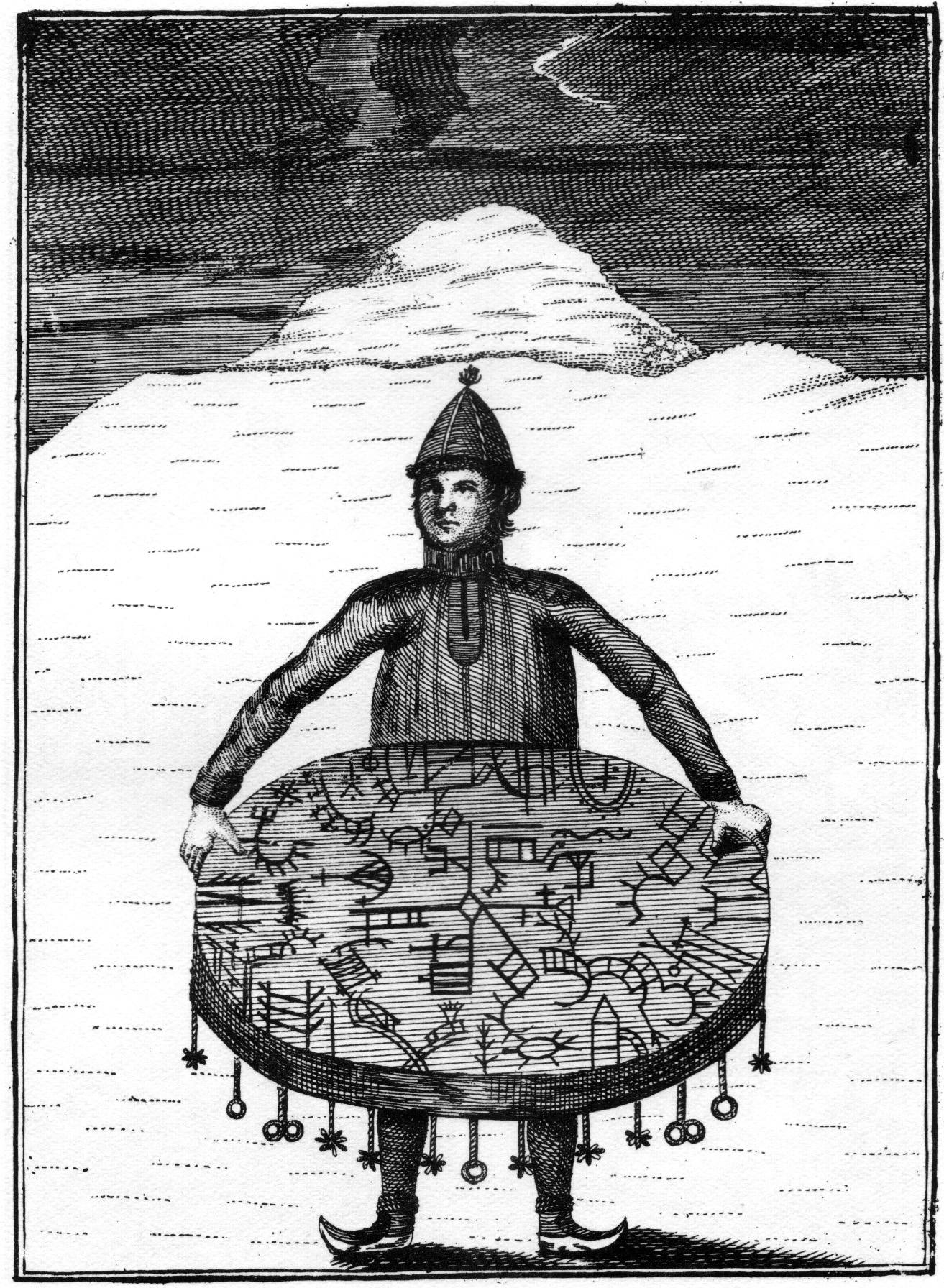
An 18th century copper carving depicting a Sámi shaman with a drum used in traditional religious ceremonies

During the 1500s, missionary activity was initiated to convert the Sámi people living in Norway, who at the time were still practicing their traditional, indigenous religion. While scattered attempts to spread Christianity to lands inhabited by the Sámi had occurred before this time period, it was only in this period that systematic mass conversions were utilized, beginning with a subgroup of the Sámi known as the Sea Sámi, who lived in the coastal regions of Norway. Consequently, traditional Sámi religious practices were suppressed, in some cases on pain of death.

In 1569, Frederick II ordered that all foreigners in Denmark had to affirm their commitment to 25 articles of faith central to Lutheranism on pain of deportation, forfeiture of all property, and death. These restrictions were lifted for Sephardic Jews already established as merchants in Altona when Christian IV took over the town. Christian IV also issued the first letter of safe passage to a Jew (Albert Dionis) in 1619, and on June 19, 1630, general amnesty was granted to all Jews permanently in residence in Glückstadt, including the right to travel freely throughout the kingdom.

In 1687, during the reign of Christian V of Denmark, Jews were formally barred from the Kingdom of Denmark–Norway. However, kings generally tolerated Jewish merchants, investors, and bankers whose contributions benefited the economy of the Danish-Norwegian realm, while also seeking to restrict their movements, residence, and presence in public life. Several Jews, particularly in the Sephardic Teixera family but also some of Ashkenazi origins, were given letters of passage to visit places in Denmark and Norway; but there were also several incidents of Jews who were arrested, imprisoned, fined, and deported for violating the general ban against their presence, even when they claimed the exemption granted to Sephardim.

The death penalty for the practice of "Sámi sorcery" was lifted in 1726. However, harsh punishments for "witchcraft", "superstition", and "insufficient church attendance" continued throughout this period. Sámi children were forced to attend missionary schools, where they were further indoctrinated in Christianity.

In 1741, Christian VI issued the Conventicle Act, forbidding lay preachers from holding services – conventicles – without the approval of the local priest.

The Church of Denmark would continue to be the state religion of Norway until its independence in 1814.

=== 1814 Constitution and union with Sweden (1814–1905) ===
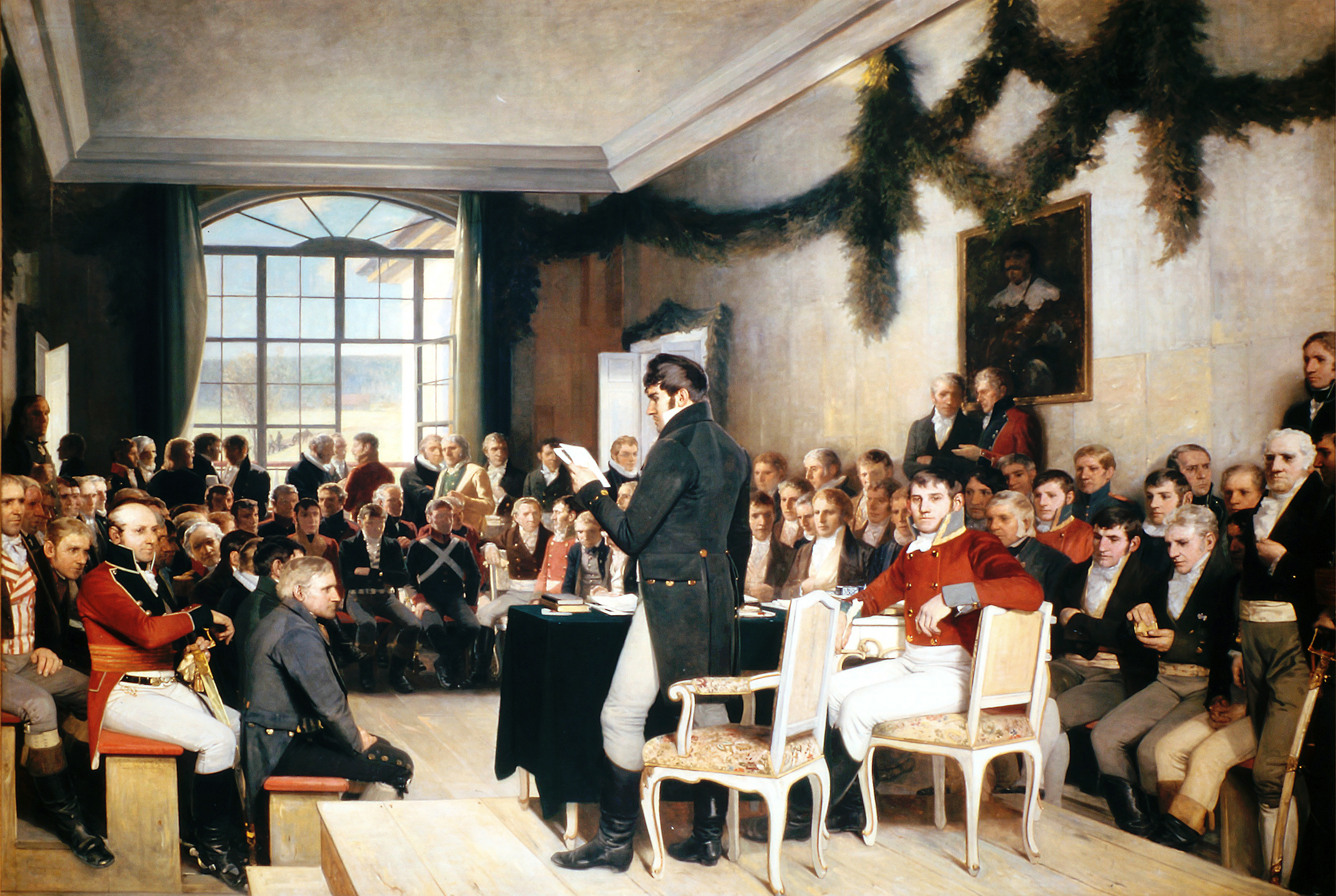
An 1885 painting depicting the 1814 Constituent Assembly

In 1814, Norway was transferred to the Kingdom of Sweden as part of the Treaty of Kiel. An attempt to create an independent Norway led to the creation of a constitution by the Norwegian Constituent Assembly. Although Norway did not achieve independence at this time, it entered into an equal union with Sweden, which in turn recognized the Norwegian Constitution's authority in Norway. This constitution upheld the Evangelical-Lutheran church as the state religion of Norway, as well as prohibiting the establishment of monastic orders, and prohibited the entry of Jews as well as Jesuits, despite the fact that at this time Denmark was liberalizing its attitude toward Jewish people and granting them increased rights and privileges. In 1842, the Conventicle Act was lifted. The Dissenter Act, allowing most other Christian denominations to establish churches, was enacted in 1845. The Jew Clause was lifted in 1851 thanks to the efforts of Henrik Wergeland, according Jews rights on par with Christian religious dissenters. The ban on monastic orders was lifted in 1897, but the Jesuit clause remained in effect until 1957.

During the 19th century, there were a few scattered instances of religiously motivated uprisings in Sámi territories. These uprisings were generally targeted against members of the Christian, non-Sámi ruling class such as merchants, ministers, and bailiffs. In some cases the uprisings were conducted not by followers of pre-Christian religions but by members of Sámi Christian sects such as Laestadians.

=== Independence, the Holocaust, and constitutional reform (1905 – present) ===
In 1905, Norway's union with Sweden dissolved and Norway became an independent state.

Following decades of political battles, in 1929 the Norwegian parliament passed a law that mandated that animals must be stunned before slaughter, effectively prohibiting slaughterhouses from complying with Jewish and Islamic dietary laws.

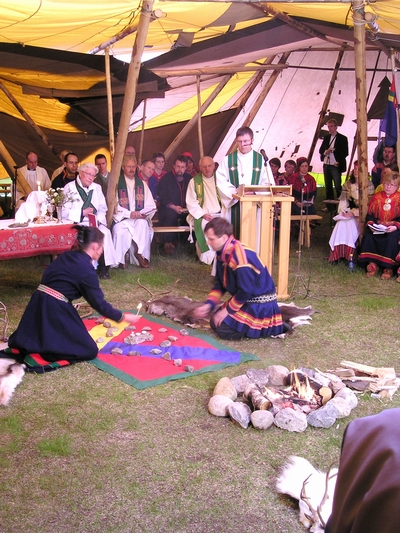
A Sámi religious ceremony in 2004 at the Samiske kirkedager featuring both Christian and syncretic pre-Christian rituals

In 1940, Norway was invaded and occupied by Germany as part of World War II. German authorities, aided by Norwegian police departments, implemented the Holocaust on Norway's Jewish population. Of the 2,173 Jews who lived in Norway prior to German invasion, at least 775 were deported to camps, and 765 were killed either in concentration camps or extrajudicially. A significant portion of the remaining Jews were smuggled out of the country by the Norwegian resistance movement. The Nazi collaborationist Quisling regime reinstated the 19th century ban on Jews in Norway. According to historian Kjersti Dybvig, after the end of WWII, the Norwegian government refused to pay for the travel expenses of Jews returning to Norway.

It was only in 1997 that the Norwegian government opened an investigation into the theft of assets from Jewish people during the Holocaust. The findings of the inquiry were that between 108 million and 330 million NOK of property (~$15 million) were confiscated. Parliament consequently adopted a measure to pay 450 million NOK in reparations, some of which was paid directly to victims or their family, and the rest of which was contributed to fund Jewish organizations both in Norway and internationally.

Throughout the second half of the 20th century, Norway has passed a number of laws recognizing the Sámi as a group indigenous to Norway and protecting their cultural traditions. However, despite some revival of cultural traditions since the end of WWII and the syncretic persistence of some of the traditional Sámi religion within Sámi Christianity, the indigenous Sámi religion remains largely eradicated as a consequence of prior missionary activity.

In 2012, the parliament of Norway passed a law establishing the separation of church and state, although the Church of Norway is still mentioned in the constitution and accorded with a special status.

In June 2018, Norway's parliament voted to ban the burqa and niqab in schools, nurseries, and universities.

== Legal framework ==
The constitution states that all individuals shall have the right to free exercise of their religion, and all religious and philosophical communities shall be supported on equal terms. The constitution also states, "the King shall at all times profess the Evangelical-Lutheran religion," and that national values shall remain anchored in the country's Christian and humanistic heritage. The law further specifies the right of individuals to choose or change their religion.

A constitutional amendment separates the Church of Norway from the state, but the constitution stipulates the Church of Norway shall remain the national church and as such shall be supported by the state. The government continues to provide direct financial support to the Church as a block grant in the national budget and covers the cost of salaries, benefits, and pension plans of Church employees. Municipal governments also provide direct support to individual congregations.

Any person over the age of 15 has the right to join or leave a religious community. Parents have the right to decide their child's religion before age 15, but they must take into consideration the views of children once they reach the age of 7 and give their views priority once they reach the age of 12.

Individuals may apply for a full exemption from the required registration for a year of military service on religious grounds, and are not required to perform alternative service.

Foreign religious workers are subject to the same visa and work permit requirements as other foreign workers.

=== Religious group registration ===
All registered religious and life-stance organizations are eligible to apply for financial support from the government. Nearly 800 such organizations receive state support, based on the number of each group's members. In order to register, a faith or life-stance organization must notify the county governor and provide its creed and doctrine, activities, names of board members, names and responsibilities of group leaders, operating rules – including who may become a member – voting rights, the process for amending statutes, and the process for dissolution. A group registers only once in one county but reports its national tally of members.

If a religious group does not register, it will not receive financial support from the government, but there are no restrictions on its activities.

By law, life-stance communities, but not religious groups, must have a minimum of 500 members to qualify for government funding. A draft law presented to parliament in 2019 would drop this requirement to 50 members and apply equally to both life-stance communities and religious groups, but of as of the end of 2019 the law has not been passed, although government and life-stance organizations state that the law has broad support and is likely to pass in 2020.

In 2023, Jehovah's Witnesses were fully deregistered as a result of their shunning practice. Since children are not exempt from this practice, the country concluded that it was psychological violence. This prevented the group from receiving the annual subsidies and the right to perform civil marriages. This ruling by the Oslo District Court to uphold the government's decision was unanimously overturned by the Borgarting Court of Appeal on March 14, 2025, with Jehovah's Witnesses also being awarded 8,500,000 kroner ($806,833 USD) in compensation for legal expenses incurred during both the initial trial and the following appeal. The Norwegian Supreme Court confirmed this decision a year later.

=== Anti-discrimination laws ===
The penal code specifies penalties, including a fine or imprisonment for up to six months, for discrimination based on religion and for expressions of disrespect for religious beliefs or members of religious groups. In practice, the government applies penalties for disrespect for religious beliefs only in cases of incitement to violence.

The Equality and Anti-Discrimination Ombud reviews cases of religious discrimination. Anyone may file a complaint with the ombudsman. The ombudsman publishes nonbinding findings, which provide the basis for legal investigations and follow-up, in response to complaints that a person or organization has violated a law or regulation within the ombudsman's mandate. The ombudsman also provides advice and guidance on anti-discrimination law.

=== Restrictions on religious animal slaughter ===
According to the law, an animal must first be stunned or administered anesthetics before slaughter, making most traditional kosher and halal slaughter practices illegal. Halal and kosher meat may be imported. The Islamic Council Norway certifies some locally produced meat as halal upon review of applications and procedures submitted by producers or distributors that demonstrate that the stunned animal's heart is still beating when slaughtered.

In response to the effective ban on the production of most kosher and halal meat in the country by the law on animal slaughter, the Ministry of Agriculture has waived import duties and provide guidance on import procedures to both the Jewish and Muslim communities.

== Government practices ==
The Church of Norway received more than two billion NOK ($244 million) in funding from the government in 2017. The government provided other registered religious and life-stance organizations approximately 344 million NOK ($42 million). The government also regularly provides 12 million NOK ($1.5 million) per year to religious umbrella organizations, such as the Christian Council of Norway and the Council for Religious and Life Stance Communities (STL), with the intent for fostering inter-religious dialogue. The government regularly spends several million NOK per year (equivalent to several hundred thousand US dollars) to fund security services for Jewish facilities in Oslo.

The national police unit for combating organized and other serious crimes maintains a web page for the public to contact police regarding hate crimes and hate speech, including religiously motivated incidents.

The government has banned the wearing of religious symbols, including headgear, with police uniforms. A ban against wearing the burqa and niqab in schools, nurseries, and universities was voted in by parliament in 2018. Sikh organizations have criticized the government's requirements to have ears visible in passport photographs.

=== Education ===
Public schools continue to include a mandatory course on Christian Knowledge and Religious and Ethical Information (CKREE) for grades one through 10. State-employed instructors teach the CKREE, which covers world religions and philosophies while promoting tolerance and respect for all religious beliefs, as well as for atheism. Up to 50 percent of the CKREE course content is devoted to Christianity. Students may not opt out of this course. Many non-Christian organizations, including the Norwegian Humanist Association, have complained about the use of the word "Christian" in the title of this education program.

Schools do not permit religious ceremonies, but schools may organize religious outings, such as attending Christmas services at a local Lutheran church. Children may be exempted at their parents' request from participating in or performing specific religious acts, such as a class trip to a church. The parents need not give a reason for requesting an exemption. Students may apply to be absent in order to celebrate certain religious holidays, such as Eid or Passover, but there is no celebration or observance of these holidays in public schools.

The Ministry of Education provides grants for schools to engage in anti-religious-discrimination education. Programs include school trips to the Auschwitz-Birkenau in Poland as well as other Nazi death camps, with an estimated 15,000–20,000 students participating each year.

=== Anti-discrimination programs ===
The government maintains an action plan to counter anti-Semitism in society. The plan emphasizes data collection, training and education programs in schools, research on anti-Semitism and Jewish life in the country, and efforts to safeguard Jewish culture. Under the plan, police must work toward including anti-Semitism as a separate category of hate crime in police statistics. In 2019, the government reported that their programs against anti-Semitism were successful, and committed to renewing them for an additional five-year period beginning in 2021. Following the Bærum mosque shooting in 2019, the government announced that it would adopt a similar program combating Islamophobia.

The government conducts workshops and other intervention programs targeting practitioners working with groups at risk for radicalization, including religious minority groups. The Ministry of Justice hosted an annual national conference against radicalization, which included high-level political participation.

== Societal attitudes ==
According to police and NGO reports and observations, religiously motivated hate speech, particularly online, is prevalent.

In 2016, police reported 97 religiously motivated hate crimes throughout the country, up from 79 the previous year. Police in Oslo reported 88 percent of the 24 religiously motivated hate crimes in 2016 in that district targeted Muslims, a similar percentage to the previous year. Assault and legally impermissible hate speech constituted the bulk of what the government characterized as religiously motivated crimes. On August 10, 2019, a gunman opened fire on a mosque in Bærum, Norway, injuring one before being subdued by congregants. In total, police stated that they received 144 reports of religiously motivated hate crimes in 2019, a 28.6 percent increase over 2018.

A survey on attitudes toward religious minorities published in December 2017 found that while "stereotypical [prejudicial] views about Jews still prevail in Norwegian society in 2017…they are less prevalent than in 2011." The survey concluded that the proportion of the country's population with marked prejudices against Jews and Muslims was 8.3 percent and 34.1 percent, respectively. It concluded that attitudes toward Jews in the country were influenced by attitudes towards Israel. The survey also found that negative stereotypes of Muslims were widespread in society. It stated that 14 percent of Muslims and 11 percent of Jews had been directly subjected to harassment. Further studies by the Center for Studies of the Holocaust and Religious Minorities and the Institute for Social Research have similarly registered significant levels of prejudice against Muslims, as well as discrimination in both education and employment.

== See also ==
- History of the Jews in Norway
- Religion in Norway

== Bibliography ==
- DeVries, Kelly (1999). The Norwegian Invasion of England in 1066. Boydell & Brewer Ltd. ISBN 978-0-85115-763-4.
- Derry, T.K. A Short History of Norway (George Allen and Unwin, 1968 edition)
- Førsund, Randi Helene (2012). Titlestad, Bård (ed.). Magnus Berrføtt. Sagakongene (in Norwegian). Saga Bok/Spartacus. ISBN 978-82-430-0584-6.
- Helle, Knut (1995). Under kirke og kongemakt: 1130–1350. Aschehougs Norgeshistorie. Vol. 3. Aschehoug. ISBN 8203220312.
- Lawson, M. K. (2004), Cnut – England's Viking King (2nd ed.), Stroud: Tempus, ISBN 0-7524-2964-7
- Mendelsohn, Oskar (1969). Jødenes historie i Norge gjennom 300 år: Bind 1 1660–1940 (in Norwegian). Universitetsforlaget. ISBN 82-00-02523-3.
- Stenersen, Ivar, and Oivind Libaek. History of Norway from the Ice Age to the Oil Age (3rd ed. Dinamo Forlag 2007)
- Trow, M. J. (2005), Cnut – Emperor of the North, Stroud: Sutton, ISBN 0-7509-3387-9
