= Jew Clause (Norway) =

Clause of the Constitution of Norway from 1814 to 1851

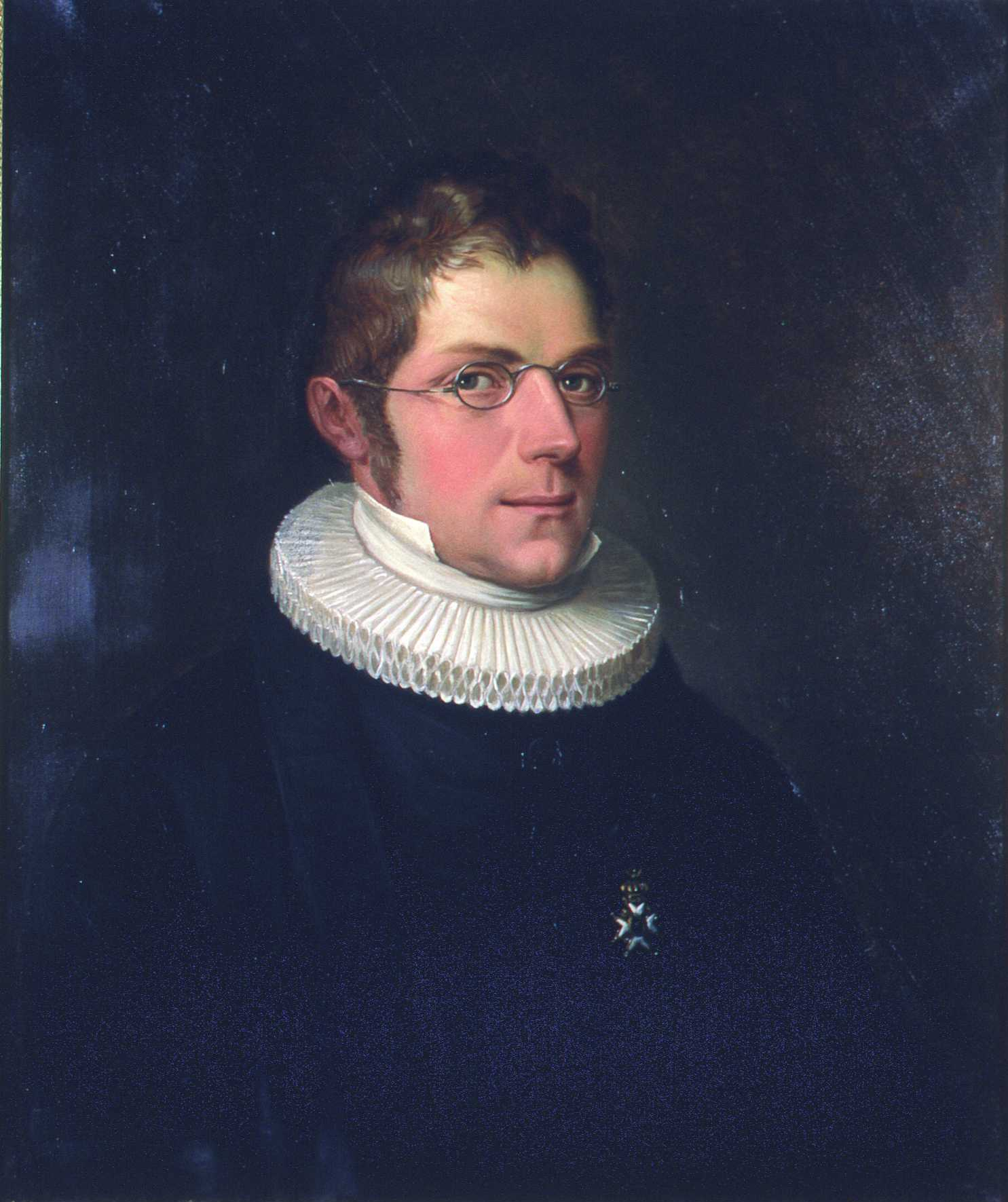
Pastor Nicolai Wergeland, together with Christian Magnus Falsen, was central in getting the ban on Jews in Norway passed. Wergeland later supported his son who worked hard to lift the ban. Portrait painted by Christian Olsen.

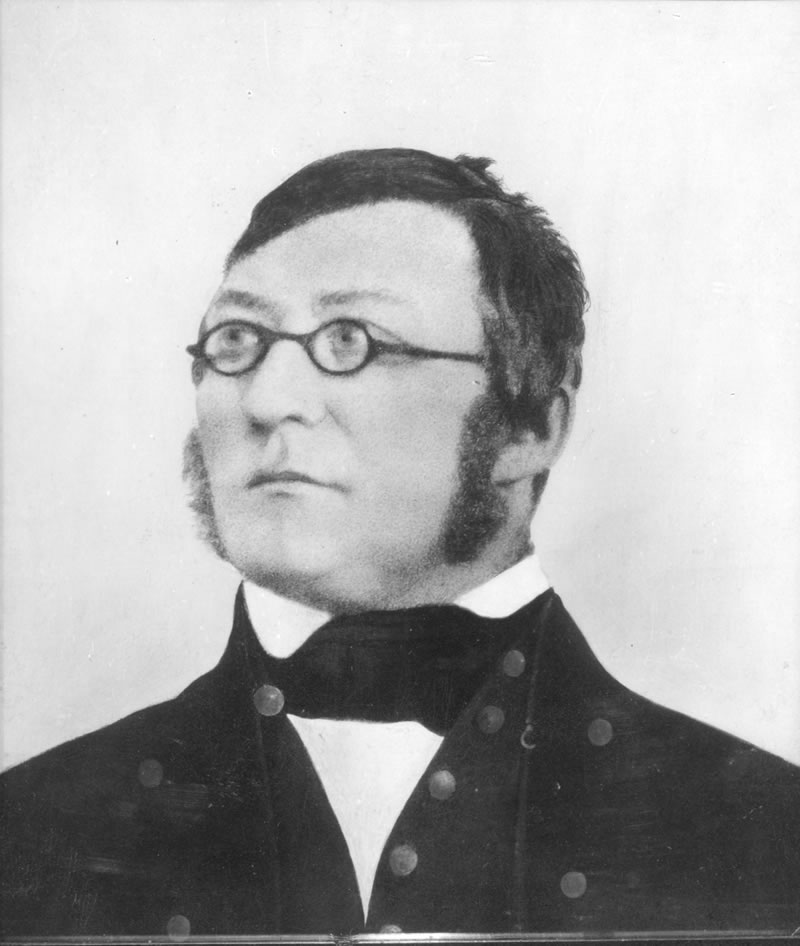
Henrik Wergeland, Nicolai's son, was also central in getting the ban on Jews lifted.

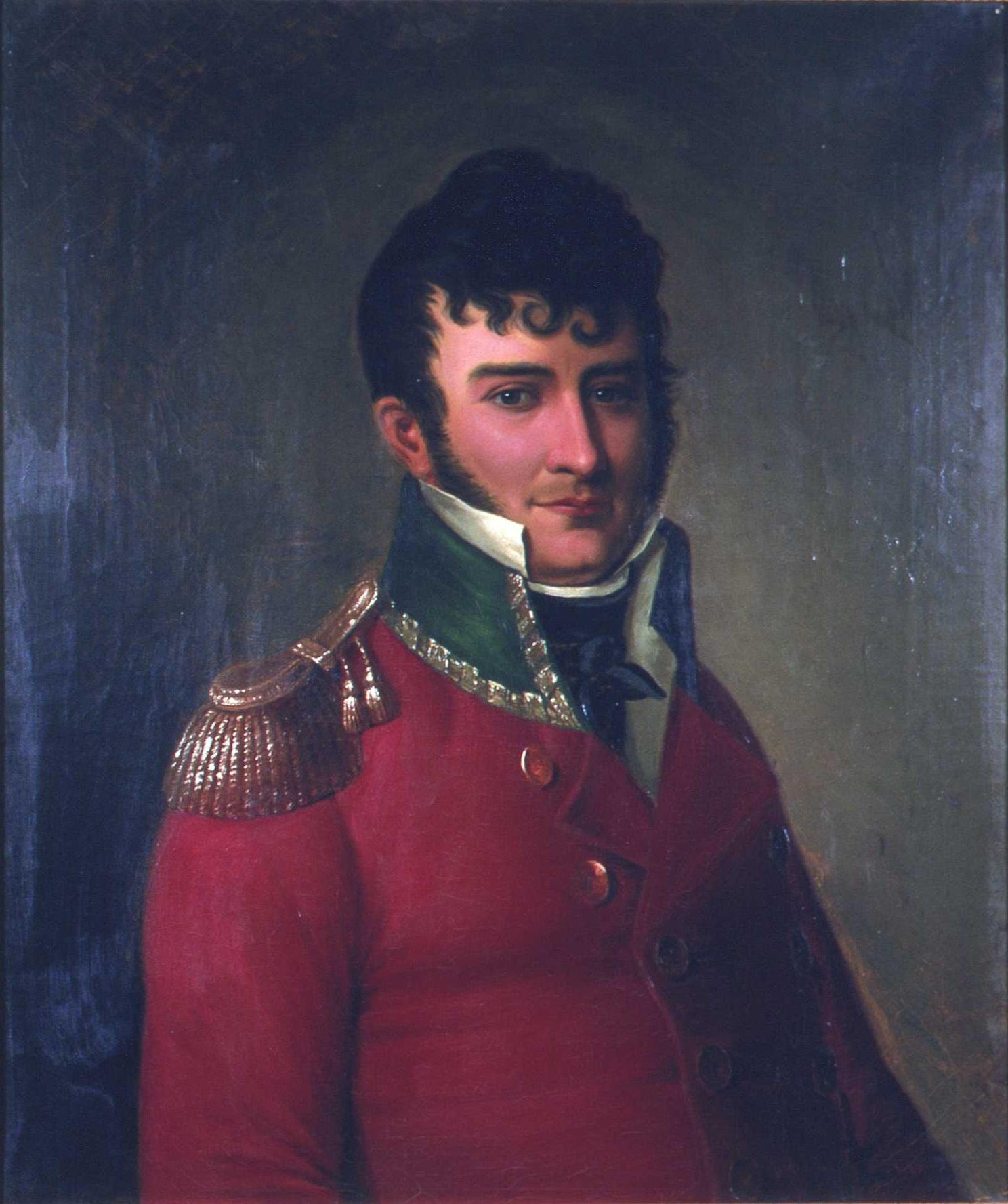
Christian Magnus Falsen, one of the principal authors of the clause.

The Jew clause (Norwegian: Jødeparagrafen) is the colloquial name of the second paragraph of the Constitution of Norway from 1814 to 1851 and from 1942 to 1945. The clause, in its original form, banned Jews from entering Norway, and also forbade Jesuits and monastic orders. An exception was made for so-called Portuguese Jews. The penultimate sentence of the same paragraph is known as the Jesuit clause (Norwegian: Jesuittparagrafen).

The clause originally reads:

Den evangelisk-lutherske Religion forbliver Statens offentlige Religion. De Indvaanere, der bekjende sig til den, ere forpligtede til at opdrage sine Børn i samme. Jesuitter og Munkeordener maae ikke taales. Jøder ere fremdeles udelukkede fra Adgang til Riget.

Translation:

The Evangelical-Lutheran religion remains the public religion of the State. The inhabitants who profess it are obliged to educate their children in the same. Jesuits and monastic orders are not to be tolerated. Jews are still excluded from admission to the kingdom.

Christian Magnus Falsen, Georg Sverdrup and Nicolai Wergeland were the central delegates behind the wording of the section's final paragraph. The wording was adopted on May 4, 1814. Those behind the law were highly educated and among the country's most well-read men. This paragraph was finalized in Constitutional Committee and adopted after discussion, but without changes in the plenary.

== Background ==
The paragraph can be seen as a continuation of Christian V's Norwegian Code of 1687, which stipulated that no Jews could reside in Norway without a safe conduct, but the wording of the Constitution was strongly restrictive since the prohibition in the Constitution was absolute and without legal possibilities for exception, for example by safe conduct.

Elsewhere in Europe, civil rights were on the rise in the Napoleonic era. Countries such as Sweden, Denmark, Prussia, Austria and the Netherlands had all liberalized many special restrictions and regulations against Jews between 1782 and 1814. Jews were given the status of guests where they were not given the status of inhabitants or full citizens. However, Norway's Constitution, considered the freest in Europe, became the most anti-Jewish. Christian V's Norwegian Code of 1687 required Jews seeking entry to the kingdom to have a safe conduct from the King. Sephardic Jews were admitted. The penalty for violation could be up to a thousand riksdaler in fines and the informer was rewarded with 50 riksdaler. Converts had access to the country; Isaac Hambro, for example, came from Copenhagen and settled in Bergen as a merchant. In the 18th century, there were a few known cases of Jews being expelled and/or fined. The 1814 law represented a significant injunction.

Intellectual historian Håkon Harket bases his thesis on, among other things, a previously unknown note by Christian Magnus Falsen on Moses and the Hebrews. Falsen believed that the Jews were not suitable as citizens of states they did not govern themselves. This was a political and not a religious justification according to Harket: it was a notion that the Jews represented a threat to equality, freedom and the unity of the state. The supporters of the clause were Nicolai Wergeland, Georg Sverdrup and Christian Magnus Falsen. They were well-versed in the history of the Jews given at the time. These notions were supported by conspiracy theories and fears of "dangerous Jews". Among liberal intellectuals in the wake of the Enlightenment, there was strong skepticism of Judaism because they believed that the Jewish priesthood promoted an unreformed philosophy that kept the Jewish population down in ignorance and poverty. Famous names in the Enlightenment took this stand, not least Voltaire. Prussian writer Friedrich Buchholz, who was central to the debate on the civil rights of Jews in Denmark and Germany, was likely an intellectual role model for Falsen. For Buchholz, it was not a conflict between two religions, but between different paths of development, and Buchholz believed that this problem could only be solved by Jewish girls marrying Christian men, while Jewish men had to be forcibly conscripted into the Prussian army.

According to Harket, it was instead intolerance based on Enlightenment criticism of religion that led to the Jews being explicitly denied access to the kingdom of one of Europe's freest constitutions. In retrospect, the impression was created that the Jew clause was based on ignorance and religious prejudice. Supporters of the clause pointed out that the country was originally without Jews and they therefore did not think it was intolerant to uphold the ban. They justified it, for instance, with the idea that Jews could never be good citizens of any state where Jews did not rule because of a tendency to form a "state within a state" – an expression derived from the philosopher Johann Gottlieb Fichte. Hans C. U. Midelfart argued at the Constituent Assembly at Eidsvoll Manor against the clause. Theology professor Johann David Michaelis in Göttingen argued in the 1700s against equal status for Jews, and both Falsen and Wergeland had Michaelis' anti-Semitic book. Falsen believed that Jews were unfit as citizens of other countries as they had their own law (the Law of Moses) and therefore could not obtain civil rights in a country where other laws applied. Wergeland likely justified the ban in the interests of confessional unity in the country. Lauritz Weidemann argued partly antisemitically, believing that the Jews' desire to emerge as a state made them untrustworthy citizens. Herman Wedel Jarlsberg was partly opposed. Frode Ulvund writes that Teis Lundegaard probably did not have a significant role as has been suggested.

In the 19th century, the stateless Jews were regarded as a symbolic counterpart to national identity. In the 1875 census, there were only 25 Jews in Norway. Jews were a common theme in Morgenbladet in the 1800s. It supported the fight against the Jew clause, but was patronizing in its mention of Jews. Morgenbladet argued in principle against the Jew clause and at the same time warned against the consequences of lifting it. Henrik Wergeland was also condescending in his mention of two arrested Jews in 1844. He believed that by lifting the clause, many rich, educated and enterprising Jews would come to the country. In addition to this economic argument, he justified the opposition to the paragraph with Christian charity. For Wergeland it was a prerequisite that the Jews were culturally assimilated and that religion be a private matter.

== Implementation ==
The ban on Jews was quickly enforced. By the end of 1814, the first suspected Jews were already being expelled or banished. Four men were exiled from Bergen at the end of 1814 after pressure from the local merchant class. Fear of competition from Jewish merchants was an important driving force behind the enforcement of the clause. But they were not fined or arrested. Only at the end of the 1820s were the penal provisions of Christian V's Norwegian Code used. In 1822, the king, the government and the parliament chose to completely ignore that the Constitution was violated. Norway was in financial crisis. A large installment on the national debt to Denmark was due, but Norway could not pay. King Charles XIV John threatened to put Norway under the Swedish constitution if the installment was not paid. Norwegian independence was in danger. Danish Joseph Hambro and Swedish Vilhelm Benedicks came to Norway twice that year to negotiate government debt. The former represented the financial house Hambro, the latter the financial house Michaelson & Bendicks. Both were Jews. A state loan from Hambro was the saving grace for Norway. The national debt and the loan crisis led to a pragmatic approach to the Jewish clause, according to historian Frode Ulvund.

In the difficult years after 1814, Finance Minister Herman Wedel Jarlsberg had tried to borrow money from banks in London. Because of the Jewish clause in the Constitution, he could not get a loan from Rothschild, and Rothschild had convinced the other banks in London to boycott the Norwegian state.

In 1844, Emanuel Philipson and Leon Lopez were arrested in Christiania (today Oslo) after a raid on Lütken's billiard hall. The police found out that the two had broken the Jew clause. Lopez was released under an exemption for "Portuguese Jews"; Philipson was imprisoned for 30 days because he could not pay the fine of 800 specidaler (a considerable sum at the time). Morgenbladet wrote in a commentary that the two had contributed to "reinforcing the rather widespread belief that the country will be overrun by swindlers and fraudsters [Skakrere og Bedragere] if the ban on Jews entering the kingdom is lifted". Skakrere was at that time a derogatory term for Jewish itinerant merchants, synonymous with swindler. Andreas Munch wrote a satirical play based on Morgenbladet's views and polemics with its more liberal competitor, Den Constitutionelle. Adolph Tidemand drew the caricature "Jødenes mottagelse i Christiania" ('the Jews' reception in Christiania') based on the episode. Henrik Wergeland expressed no sympathy for the two, whom he described as "scoundrels of Jews".

== Debate and decision at Eidsvoll ==
It was long believed that the ban on Jews in Norway was included in the Constitution at the request of "reactionary forces in the populace"; though there is little documented from the discussion within the constitutional committee, it now appears that the ban was driven forward by Falsen, Sverdrup and Wergeland. Wergeland had his own draft constitution and the Jew clause was the only one where he was in full agreement with Sverdrup and Falsen. It was neither the peasants nor the merchant class who were the instigators, but the most influential intellectuals who dominated the constitutional committee, according to intellectual historian Håkon Harket.

Wedel Jarlsberg spoke to a certain extent for the Jews' cause at Eidsvoll, while Arnoldus Koren demanded full religious freedom. Koren was the one who argued most strongly against the clause. Hans Midelfart stressed that it was inhuman and intolerant to exclude a large group on the basis of religious differences, and Midelfart opposed the clause. Wedel Jarlsberg and Midelfart argued against the paragraph because they believed it was contrary to the spirit of the Constitution. Priests Jonas Rein and Peter Hount also argued against the clause. Hount said that the paragraph was abhorrently intolerant as the Jews were given "no place to dwell on God's green earth". Wedel Jarlsberg also thought that the paragraph was illiberal. Hount wanted exemptions for particularly affluent Jews. Peter Motzfeldt argued on the grounds of confessional unity and he believed the Jews could not assimilate. Several comments in the debate claimed that they were not afraid of the Jews' religion. Some arguments were economic, including that some Jews made a living as itinerant traders. It was presumably the chairman of the assembly, Peder Anker, who asked all supporters of the clause to stand up. When the majority was clearly evident, Christian VIII noted in the register that politics prevailed over tolerance. The ban on Jews was originally formulated as an exception to the main rule of freedom of religion.

The paragraph was finalized in the constitutional committee and adopted after discussion but without amendment in plenary. Wilhelm Frimann Koren Christie, cousin of Arnoldus Korens also made an interpellation at the same time which led to Jesuits and monastic orders also being included in the clause.

It has been argued that representative John Moses, who came from a British merchant family in Kristiansund, likely had Jewish ancestry. Moses may have been of Jewish descent although there is no definitive information; the families may have come from the so-called Portuguese Jews (Borøchstein cites Oskar Mendelsohn).

== Four attempts at repeal ==
Heinrich Nordahl Glogau was the first to publicly criticize the clause and thought it should be removed. Glogau, who had converted to Christianity and become a merchant in Bergen, reacted to an anti-Jewish article in the newspaper. In 1817, Glogau openly criticized Falsen in the journal Den norske Tilskuer, where Falsen was editor. In 2018, the Møhlenpris stairway in Bergen was given the name Heinrich Glogau's stairway.

With his poem "Jødene" ('The Jews') in 1836, Andreas Munch distanced himself from the clause:

Du lukker dine Havne til
Naar Jøden Fristed søge vil,
Du støder fornem bort et Folk –
Er det at være Friheds Tolk?

Translation:

You close your ports
When the Jew seeks refuge
You drive away a people –
Is that what it means to be the interpreter of freedom?

Henrik Wergeland first raised the issue of amending the Constitution (§ 2) in Statsborgeren in 1837. In 1839 Wergeland sent a proposal for a constitutional amendment to parliament. The proposal was sponsored by Søren Anton Wilhelm Sørensen, President of the Parliament, and presented on 28 June 1839. Henrik later convinced his father Nicolai, the clause's architect, to work for its repeal.

The first attempt to repeal the clause came in 1842, 20 years after the Hambro loan had been negotiated. In this conjunction, Henrik Wergeland had published the poetry collection Jøden (The Jew) and had it sent to every member of parliament before the first vote was taken to repeal the clause.

In the constitutional committee's statement on the matter in 1842, a translation was made and quoted from a German encyclopedia which gave a somewhat complimentary account of Norway's attitude towards the Jews:

The only state in Europe that has not tolerated Jews up to this moment is Norway. There have never been any Jews here, and the Constitution of 1814 expressly excludes them from all residence in the kingdom. Here, therefore, the ruthless antipathies against the Jewish people have been preserved longest and in the sharpest manifestation, although the criticism that arises from this only affects the Norwegians' tolerance, not their sense of justice, for no people can be denied the right to regulate with free arbitrariness those provisions according to which foreigners are permitted or forbidden to come into the country and to share the advantages of the state. Such arrivals do not yet have any claims, and if their entrance is therefore denied, this at least does not constitute a violation of rights. From the moral point of view, however, the matter is different, and here the harshness and insensitivity with which, it is asserted, even shipwrecked Jews are treated on the Norwegian coast deserves special rebuke.

In the press and in Parliament there was extensive argumentation against the proposal, often economically justified. Politician Peder Jensen Fauchald, school principal Hans Holmboe, and others also fought for its repeal. In the vote, 51 voted in favor of the committee recommendation to remove the Jewish clause, 43 against. This was not the necessary two-thirds majority required by constitutional amendments, and the proposal failed.

Henrik Wergeland continued to work for the cause until his death in 1845. The same year, the proposal failed for a second time, and in 1848 for a third time. At the fourth hearing in Parliament, the constitutional amendment was adopted on June 13, 1851. It was ratified by the king on July 21. Legislation based on the Jew clause was then adapted, and finally, on September 24, 1851, the king enacted Lov om Ophævelse af det hidtil bestaaende Forbud mod at Jøder indfinde sig i Riget m.v. (the Law on the Repeal of the Hitherto Existing Prohibition of Jews Entering the Kingdom, etc.) Jews were thus awarded religious rights on par with Christian dissenters.

== The Occupation and the Jew clause ==
During the Second World War, Vidkun Quisling's Nasjonal Samling regime reintroduced the clause on March 12, 1942. The amendment was signed on March 12, 1942 by Quisling, Sverre Riisnæs and Rolf Jørgen Fuglesang. The clause then remained in place until the liberation in 1945. Quisling was convicted of illegal amendment of the Constitution after the war.

== Other excluded persons ==
Monastic orders were allowed to enter the country in 1897, while the Jesuits had to wait until 1956, when Norway was going to ratify the European Convention on Human Rights. A minority in the Parliament voted against, including C. J. Hambro (Conservative Party) and Lars Elisæus Vatnaland (Bondepartiet) and Erling Wikborg (Christian Democratic Party). Opposition was strong in some Christian circles, with theologian Olav Valen-Sendstad as a key spokesman.

== Later sections on religious freedom ==
In 1964, paragraph 2 was amended again, this time by adding the right to free exercise of religion. The paragraph reads:

Alle Indvaanere av Riget have fri Religionsøvelse. Den evangelisk-lutherske Religion forbliver Statens offentlige Religion. De Indvaanere, der bekjende seg til den, ere forpligtede til at opdrage sine Børn i samme.

Translation:

All inhabitants of the kingdom shall have free exercise of religion. The Evangelical-Lutheran religion shall remain the public religion of the State. The inhabitants who profess it are obliged to educate their children in the same.

On May 21, 2012, the paragraph was amended again by removing the reference to the state's public religion, and the amended paragraph § 2 reads:

Værdigrundlaget forbliver vor kristne og humanistiske Arv. Denne Grundlov skal sikre Demokrati, Retsstat og Menneskerettighederne.

Translation:

Our values remain our Christian and humanist heritage. This Constitution shall guarantee democracy, the rule of law and human rights.

The provision on freedom of religion was moved to § 16:

Alle Indvaanere af Riget have fri Religionsøvelse. Den norske Kirke, en evangelisk-luthersk kirke, forbliver Norges Folkekirke og understøttes som saadan af Staten. Nærmere Bestemmelser om dens Ordning fastsættes ved Lov. Alle Tros- og Livssynssamfund skal understøttes paa lige Linje.

Translation:

All inhabitants of the kingdom shall have free exercise of religion. The Norwegian Church, an Evangelical Lutheran Church, remains the People's Church of Norway and is supported as such by the State. The details of its organization shall be determined by law. All faith and philosophical communities shall be supported on an equal basis.

== See also ==
- History of the Jews in Norway
- Freedom of religion in Norway
