= Fartein Valen-Sendstad =

Norwegian historian and museologist (1918–1984)

- Born: 15 June 1918; Kristiania, Norway
- Died: 13 February 1984 (aged 65)
- Occupations: historian and museologist
- Known for: Director of Maihaugen in Lillehammer, Norway
- Notable work: Gudbrandsdalen gjennom tidene

Fartein Valen-Sendstad (15 June 1918 – 13 February 1984) was a Norwegian historian and museologist. He served as Director of Maihaugen in Lillehammer, Norway.

He was born 15 June 1918 in Kristiania (now Oslo), Norway. He attended Oslo Cathedral School and the University of Oslo cand.philol. (1947); PhD. (1965). He worked as curator of the Sandvig Collection at Maihaugen in Lillehammer from 1949. In 1964 he succeeded Sigurd Grieg as museum administrator. He also lectured at the Norges Landbrukshøgskole in Akershus.

He published the three-volume series Gudbrandsdalen gjennom tidene in cooperation with Sigurd Grieg. His main research contribution was on the history of agriculture in Norway.
