= Olav Valen-Sendstad =

Norwegian priest (1904–1963)

- Born: 30 June 1904; Notodden, Norway
- Died: 5 May 1963 (aged 58); Oslo, Norway
- Education: Free Faculty of Theology
- Occupations: Theologian, philosopher, priest
- Theological work
- Main interests: Lutheran orthodoxy

Olav Valen-Sendstad (30 June 1904 – 5 May 1963) was a Norwegian theologian, priest, and philosopher.

== Biography ==
Valen-Sendstad was born in Notodden, Norway, to agricultural school teacher Aksel Sendstad (1872–1922) and Magnhild Valen, and grew up in Kristiania (today Oslo), where he took his examen artium in 1923 and received his cand. theol. degree from the Free Faculty of Theology in 1928. From 1931 to 1941 he was the vicar of Jelsa, and from 1941 to 1955 resident chaplain of St. Johannes Church in Stavanger. I 1948 he received his doctorate; his thesis was Reality and understanding of reality, and from 1948 to 1949 he substituted for professor Arne Næss in teaching philosophy at the University of Oslo. From 1958 on he taught at Fjellhaug School, part of the Norwegian Lutheran Mission. Valen-Sendstad died in Oslo in 1963.

Theologically, Valen-Sendstad championed Lutheran orthodoxy, and was opposed to modern Protestant theology and Catholicism. He described himself as a "theological and ecclesiastical enfant terrible". He strongly opposed the repeal of the Jesuit clause and published Åpent brev til Norges storting 1954 : vil stortinget gi jesuitt-fascismen sin moralske anerkjennelse? ('Open letter to the 1954 Norwegian Parliament: will the parliament give Jesuit fascism its moral endorsement?')

== Bibliography ==
- Karl Barths panteistiske teologi og den norske kirke (in Norwegian). Oslo: Lutherstiftelsens forlag. 1935. OCLC 468121538.
- Forsonet med Gud (in Norwegian). Oslo: Lutherstiftelsen. 1936. OCLC 62305520.
- Tornen i kjødet (in Norwegian). Oslo: Lutherstiftelsen. 1937. OCLC 477897592.
- Rettferdiggjort av tro (in Norwegian). Oslo: Lutherstiftelsen. 1938. OCLC 31344335.
- Drømmen om den frie vilje (in Norwegian). Oslo: Lutherstiftelsens forlag. 1939. OCLC 173244564.
- Tusenårsriket og Jesu gjenkomst (in Norwegian). Oslo: Arne Gimnes. 1941.
- Ordet og troen (in Norwegian). Oslo: Land og kirke. 1946. OCLC 463125573.
- Guds allmakt og det sataniske (in Norwegian). Stavanger: Indremisjonens forlag. 1946.
- Ordet som aldri kan dø: Til selvbesinnelse, særlig for Nordens kirker (in Norwegian). Bergen: Lunde. 1949. OCLC 467755993.
- Fra troens slagmark: kristendom og ateisme (in Norwegian). Bergen: Lunde. 1950. OCLC 53353986.
- Norske radioprekener: en årgang norske radioprekener i søkelyset (in Norwegian). Bergen: Lunde. 1950. OCLC 6364873.
- Velsignelsen i Kristus Jesus (in Norwegian). Bergen: Lunde. 1953.
- Oppgjør om den lutherske dåpslære: en rekke dokumentasjoner (in Norwegian). Bergen: Lunde. 1954. OCLC 55758199.
- Når er jeg en kristen?: frelsesvisshet i lys av lov og evangelium (in Norwegian). Bergen: Lunde. 1958.
