= Constitution of Norway =

Supreme law of the Kingdom of Norway

The Constitution of the Kingdom of Norway
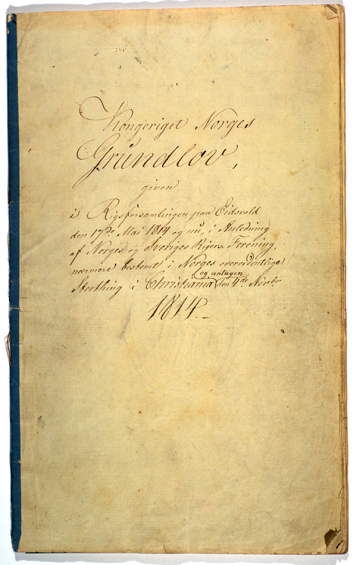
- The front page of Norway's constitution of 4 November 1814 (Novembergrunnloven), which is in the Storting archives.

Overview
- Original title: Danish: Kongeriget Norges Grundlov Bokmål: Kongeriket Norges Grunnlov Nynorsk: Kongeriket Noregs Grunnlov
- Jurisdiction: Kingdom of Norway
- Created: 10 April - 16 May 1814
- Ratified: 16 May 1814
- System: Constitutional monarchy

Government structure
- Branches: Judicial, Executive, and Legislative
- Head of state: Monarchy of Norway
- Chambers: Unicameral^{[a]}
- Executive: Prime Minister
- Judiciary: Supreme court, Court of impeachment, and subordinate courts
- Federalism: No
- Electoral college: No
- First legislature: 7 October 1814
- Citation: lovdata.no/dokument/NLE/lov/1814-05-17
- Location: Storting
- Author: Norwegian Constituent Assembly
- Supersedes: King's Law (Lex Regia)

Full text
- Constitution of Norway at Wikisource

The Constitution of Norway (complete name: The Constitution of the Kingdom of Norway; Danish: Kongeriget Norges Grundlov; Norwegian Bokmål: Kongeriket Norges Grunnlov; Norwegian Nynorsk: Kongeriket Noregs Grunnlov) was adopted on 16 May and signed on 17 May 1814 by the Norwegian Constituent Assembly at Eidsvoll. The latter date is the National Day of Norway; it marks the establishment of the constitution.

It is the fourth oldest written single-document national constitution in Europe after the Constitution of Poland, the French constitution of 1791, and the Spanish Constitution of 1812. The document is also the second oldest working national constitution in the world, after the Constitution of the United States. In May 2014, the Storting passed the most substantial changes since 1814, particularly by including paragraphs on human rights.

== History ==
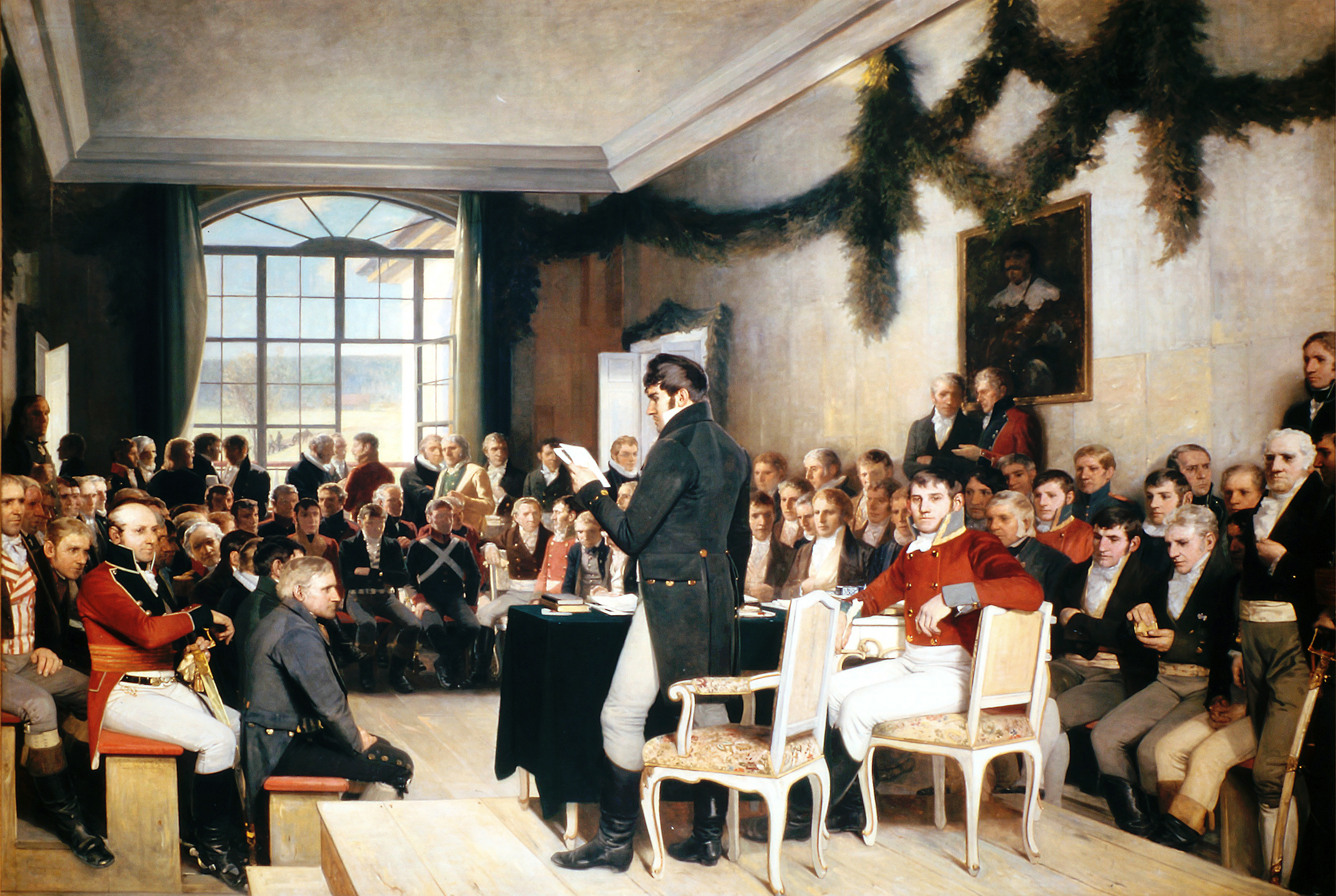
The Constituent Assembly at Eidsvoll in May 1814

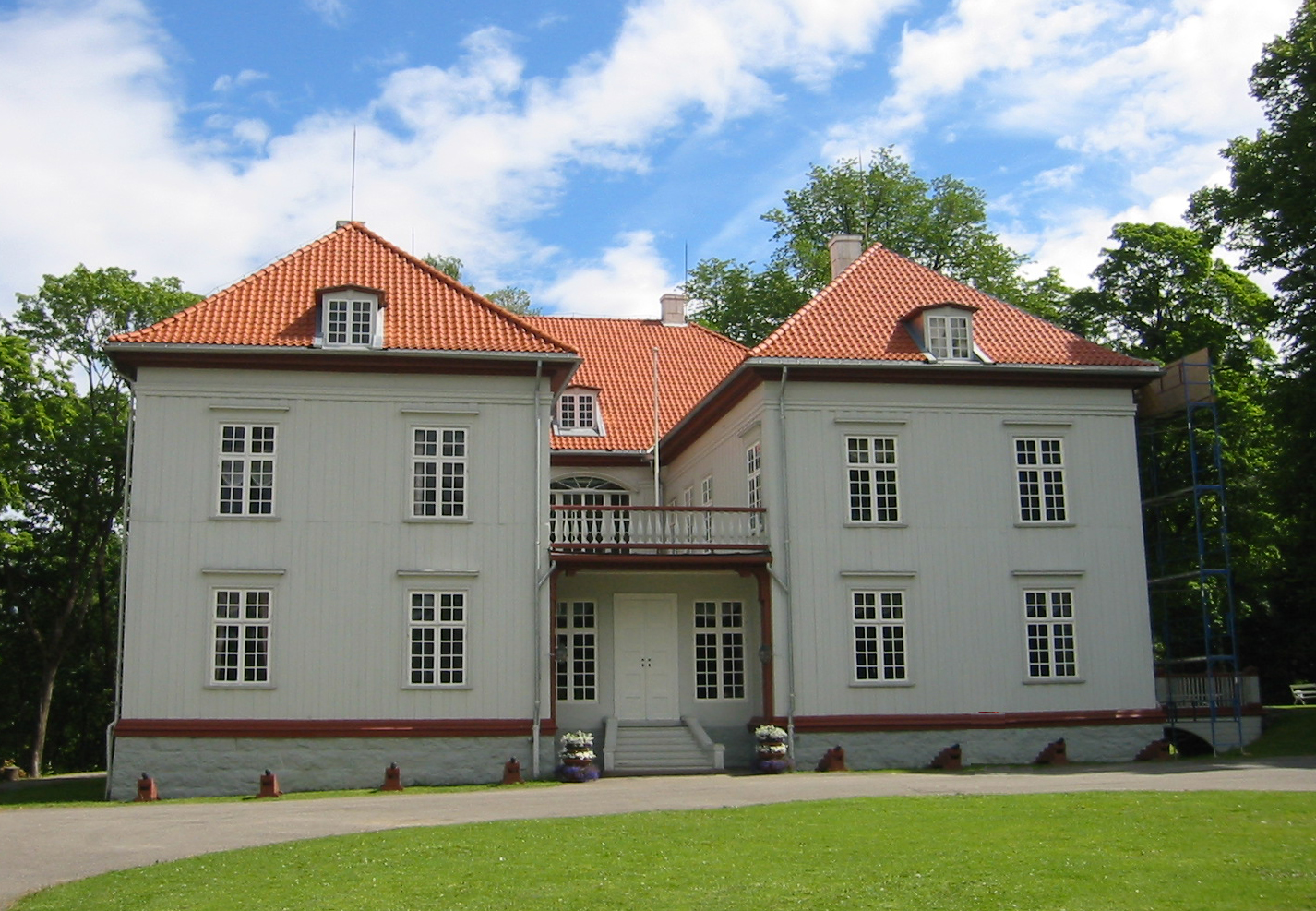
Eidsvollsbygningen, the site of the drafting of the Constitution

=== Writing the constitution ===
Until 1814, Norway was part of the Kingdom of Denmark–Norway. Following the defeat of Napoleon's troops at the Battle of Leipzig in October 1813, the Treaty of Kiel of January 1814 ceded Norway to Sweden. In response, the Crown Prince of Denmark–Norway and resident viceroy in Norway, Christian Frederik, started a Norwegian independence movement. The most likely goal of the young Crown Prince was reunification with Denmark. His initiative was successful, and a national assembly at Eidsvoll Manor was called. The assembled representatives were elected by the congregations of the state church and by military units throughout Norway.They convened at the Eidsvoll Manor on 10 April. The constitution was written during five weeks of the spring of 1814. It was ratified by the assembly on 16 May, and signed the following day. The latter date is now celebrated as the Norwegian Constitution Day.

The Norwegian constitution was inspired by the United States Declaration of Independence in 1776 and the French Revolution in 1789, and the subsequent U.S. and French constitutions. The authors, Christian Magnus Falsen and Johan Gunder Adler, were also influenced by the Spanish Constitution of 1812. A deviation from the republican constitutions of France and the United States was the retention of monarchy. Importing republicanism was seen as an attempt to emulate the French and Americans directly, something the lawmakers at Eidsvoll sought to avoid. The choice of monarchy as state form would also facilitate the reunification of Denmark–Norway, something the Crown Prince was not alone in seeking. The constitution only granted the king the power of suspensive veto. The council of Eidsvoll chose Crown Prince Christian Frederik as king. Christian Adolph Diriks, who was the legal secretary of the Constitutional Committee, was the assembly's resident expert on foreign constitutions, and played an important part in shaping the language of the constitution. Diriks is credited with formulating §100, concerning freedom of speech, and §102, guarding against unreasonable searches and seizures.

The constitution shows a curious mix of radical and traditional values. The principle of separation of powers between the executive, legislative and judicial branches was directly inspired by radical ideas from the US and French systems. The retention of a king, a constitutional church, defined as Evangelical-Lutheran, and the banning of Jesuits, monastic orders, and Jews, which latter were not allowed to travel to Norway, in the face of Republicanism was a traditionalist move; however, the king's power was severely curtailed, and the church very much under the control of the elected body. Suffrage was extended, but was still restricted to certain groups of men. All men who were either farmers possessing their own land, civil servants, or urban property owners could vote. With this, roughly 40 - 45% of Norwegian men over 25 were granted the right to vote.

=== The union with Sweden ===
The young king and Norwegian officials tried to find international backing for their bid for Norway as a sovereign state throughout spring and early summer of 1814. After failing to secure the support of the United Kingdom, war with Sweden became unavoidable. The Swedish Campaign against Norway was short and decisive. However, while badly trained and equipped, the Norwegian Army put up a determined fight, holding the Swedes back at Kongsvinger and securing a tactical victory at the battle of Langnes. This enabled the King to avoid an unconditional surrender as he was forced into negotiations with the Swedes, leading to the Convention of Moss.

Putting the strategic situation and his own abdication to good use, he persuaded the Swedish crown prince Carl Johan (the former Marshal Bernadotte of France) to let the Norwegians keep their constitution. The Swedish crown prince could have named his terms to Norway, but wanted to appease the Norwegians and avoid a bloody continuation of the war. Realizing that a forced union with himself as ruler of a conquered and hostile country would be very uneasy, he accepted the Norwegian proposition. Norway then entered into a personal union with Sweden, and the constitution was amended as necessary to form the Union between Sweden and Norway. Notably, while Norway was to keep most of its own institution, the two countries were to share a common monarch and a common foreign policy.

On 7 October, an extraordinary session of the Storting convened, and king Christian Frederik delegated his powers to the parliament and abdicated on 10 October. The Storting adopted the constitutional amendments on 4 November and on the same day unanimously elected Charles XIII king of Norway, rather than acknowledging him as such, thus reinforcing the concept a King by the will of the people.

=== Dissolution of the union and the new King ===
The union amendments were revoked after the dissolution of the 91-year union in 1905. The question of a King was again considered, and the Storting elected to offer the throne to the 33-year-old Prince Carl of Denmark, married to Princess Maud of Wales, the daughter of King Edward VII of the United Kingdom. By bringing in a king with British royal ties, it was hoped that Norway could court Britain's support. Additionally, Prince Carl was related on his father's side to Norway's medieval kings.

Prince Carl, however, was well aware of a surge of republicanism in Norway and of the constitutional situation of the Norwegian throne. He insisted that he would accept the crown only if the Norwegian people expressed their will for monarchy by referendum and if the parliament then elected him king. On 13 November, the Norwegian votes decided on monarchy with a 78.9 percent majority, and Carl was elected King by the Storting, taking the regnal name Haakon VII.

=== World War II ===
In 1942, the national socialist Minister President Vidkun Quisling, reintroduced the Jew clause, but the change was reverted after the war.

After World War II and the restoration of peace and constitutional rule, there was much debate on how to handle the events of the previous five years. None of this led to any changes in the constitution; it had withstood the test of hard times.

== Development ==
While radical in its day, the constitution of 1814 was a product of its age. As Norwegian democracy developed, some parts of it began to look increasingly dated. For example, the executive power, which in the constitution is consistently attributed to the King, came increasingly to rest in his Council of State (statsråd). Similarly, the King originally had the right to appoint members of the council, who were answerable to him alone, and they could not be chosen from the members of the Storting. With the establishment of parliamentarism in 1884, the council was effectively chosen by general election, in that the King appointed only members of the party or coalition having a majority in the Storting. Further, the Council became answerable to the Storting, in the sense that a failed vote of confidence would cause the government to resign. This last happened in March 2000, when the governing coalition refused introduction of electrical power stations based on natural gas on environmental grounds, which a majority of the Storting supported.

As a relic from the earlier laws of Denmark–Norway, Article 2 in the constitution originally read, "The Evangelical-Lutheran religion remains the public religion of the State. Those inhabitants, who confess thereto, are bound to raise their children to the same. Jesuits and monastic orders are not permitted. Jews are still prohibited from entry to the Realm." In 1851, the last sentence was struck out after the Norwegian poet Henrik Wergeland had campaigned for the rights of the Jews, and in 1897 also the next to last sentence. Monastic orders were permitted 1897, but the ban on Jesuits was only lifted in 1956.

Universal male suffrage was introduced in Norway in 1898 and universal suffrage in 1913 by amendments of the constitution.

Some constitutional scholars hold that it may be necessary to change the constitution if Norway is to enter the European Union, as the first article states that Norway is a "free, independent" country. However, the debate on the EU has been relatively quiescent since the referendum in 1994, so such a change is not likely to occur in the immediate future.

The Norwegian High Court of the Realm is warranted by the constitution and was frequently used by the Storting as a political tool to control the government during the 19th century, but no impeachments had been made since 1927. A parliamentary report and a proposition for constitutional amendment was presented in 2004 to change the legal basis of the High Court of the Realm and reduce its political bias. The proposal was passed by a unanimous Storting on 20 February 2007, and came into effect in 2009. The new court of impeachment is composed of five regular Supreme Court of Norway judges and six lay judges appointed by the Storting.

In May 2012, parliament passed a constitutional amendment, for the second time, to separate church and state. This formally made Norway a secular country with no official religion, although the Church of Norway is still mentioned in the Constitution. Article 12 in the constitution, which stated that more than half of the persons in the Council of State had to be members of the state church was also repealed.

In the run-up for the 200th anniversary for the Constitution, work was done to see if the Constitution could be amended to be more in tune with the times. In December 2011, a Committee appointed by the Storting put forth its report, suggesting that human rights be put in a separate chapter in the Constitution.

In 2014, 200 years after the constitution was written, a chapter on human rights was added as well as being rewritten into modern Bokmål and Nynorsk.

== Language ==
The events and the constitution of 1814 have a central place in Norwegian identity. For this reason, and to keep the text as consistent as possible, changes prior to the language revision in 2014 were written in a language close to the original. In 1814, Danish was still the universal written language in Norway. The current two official varieties of written Norwegian, Bokmål and Nynorsk (until 1929 called Riksmål and Landsmål respectively), were not developed until the late 19th century. Additionally, in 1903, the constitution underwent a very slight linguistic revision, changing the spelling of some words where orthography had changed since 1814 but still using conservative 19th century Danish.

All amendments prior to 2014 have attempted to imitate the language of the 1903 version, leading to peculiar constructions. The word environment was written with the archaic spelling Milieu, differing from modern Norwegian and Danish miljø; the modern context of that word was, however, non-existent in the 19th century. The "Sami ethnic group" was "den samiske Folkegruppe", even though the word Sami (samisk) was not common until the 1970s. In 1814 and 1903, the word Lappish (lappisk) would have been used. In February 2006, a constitutional amendment was aimed at correcting 15 paragraphs to the proper 1903 forms.

Different approaches to revise the language throughout the document were suggested:

- Bring the language up to today's usage and orthography.
- Use the 1903 standard but correct various passages where newer amendments do not really conform to that standard.
- Revert the language to the standard of 1814; an objection to this is that most modern Norwegians would find it even more difficult to read.
- Update the language to one of the spelling reforms, 1917, 1938, or 1959. This would still be fairly conservative language but closer to today's speech.

In 2014, when the language in the constitution was officially revised they went with the first approach, which produced an updated Bokmål version and a completely new modern Nynorsk version. The Nynorsk version was compiled by a committee headed by professor Hans Petter Graver. These are based on propositions 21, 22 and 25. Before this, the official name of the Kingdom of Norway (Bokmål: Kongeriket Norge, Nynorsk: Kongeriket Noreg) would have been "Kongeriget Norge", as in the modern Danish form if taken literally from the old constitution.

The Norwegian constitution has a version written in English, provided by the Storting.

== Rituals relating to the Constitution ==
=== Constitution Day ===
17 May, the date of the signing of the constitution, is celebrated as Norwegian Constitution Day with the school children's flag parades. In the capital Oslo, the parade passes the Royal Palace where thousands of schoolchildren wave to the King and Queen. A notable feature of the Norwegian Constitution Day celebration is the virtual absence of any military parades, the day being almost wholly a civilian celebration.

=== The State Opening of the Parliament ===
Each autumn the Storting is formally opened by the King. In an election year, the session starts with representatives for each county being formally recognised as the lawful representatives. This happens every fourth year (the Norwegian Constitution does not allow for intra-period snap elections).

After the session is opened and a secretary and president are elected for the period, the King addresses the representatives with the Trontale ('Speech from the Throne') in his capacity as formal head of state. The Trontale summarizes the government's program for the coming year, and while delivered by the King, is written by the sitting government. The Trontale is followed by a general debate, where the opposition states their main points for the year to come. Following the debate, the youngest member of the cabinet reads The Report on the State of the Realm.

== Summary of text ==
The current text of the Constitution (as amended in May 2018) consists of 121 articles, grouped into chapters A to F.

Chapter A consists of Articles 1 and 2, which state that Norway is "a free, independent, indivisible and inalienable realm" with "a limited and hereditary monarchy." The state's values are its "Christian and humanist heritage," democracy and "the rule of law and human rights." The mention of humanist values was made due to the popularity of secular humanism in Norway and the importance of secular ethics to millions of Norwegians.

Chapter B is about the King (or Queen), the royal family, the Council of State and the Church of Norway. It consists of Articles 3 to 48. It states that the King must "at all times profess the Evangelical-Lutheran religion." He may not leave the state for longer than six months without the council's permission, otherwise he automatically forfeits the Crown. It sets out the line of succession, and provides that if the line of succession dies out then the Storting shall elect a new king. It sets out the King's coronation oath.

Executive power is vested in the King, but the government is conducted in his name by a Council of State, and all of his decisions must be counter-signed by an official. The Council consists of at least eight members chosen by the King, including the Prime Minister. Members must be Norwegian citizens who are eligible to vote. More than half the members must be present to conduct business, but if not enough members are present then temporary members may be appointed. In the event of a tied vote, the Prime Minister or, in his absence, the council's highest-ranking member, has a second and casting vote. Two spouses, two siblings, or a parent and child may not be members at the same time. The Storting may pass a vote of no confidence in any member or in the whole Council, at which point the member or members must resign. The heir to the throne, if over 18, has a seat in the council but no vote.

If the King is absent from the realm or is too ill to carry out his duties, then the heir to the throne (if over 18) may act in his place; afterwards he is accountable for his actions to the King and to the Storting. If the heir is under 18 then the Council exercises the King's powers.

The King may pass temporary ordinances about commerce, customs, "all livelihoods" and public administration. These remain in force until the next Storting.

The King in Council may pardon criminals after they have been sentenced, except in cases of impeachment. In proceedings on impeachment, he may not pardon the defendant unless the Storting consents. (He may commute a death sentence without the Storting's consent, but the death penalty is now prohibited by Article 93.)

The King is commander-in-chief of the armed forces, and he appoints all civil and military officers, after consulting the council. Royal princes and princesses are disqualified from holding office. The King may, after consulting the council, dismiss the Prime Minister and other members of the council, and other senior government and military officials. He may appoint his own household officials at his own discretion. He may honour people for distinguished service, but not grant hereditary privileges.

The armed forces may not be deployed outside the realm, nor may foreign forces be allowed into the realm (except to defend it from attack), without the Storting's consent.

A prince or princess may not marry without the King's consent; contravention of that rule disqualifies them from succession to the throne. They "shall not be personally answerable to anyone other than the King" or a person delegated by him.

Article 16 says that the Church of Norway is the Established Church, "and will as such be supported by the State." However it also guarantees the right of all inhabitants of the realm to freely exercise their own religion. Article 33 states that Norges Bank is the central bank of Norway.

Chapter C (Articles 49 to 85) is about the Storting and the rights of citizens.

Legislative power is vested in the Storting, which consists of one house containing 169 members, elected every four years in free and secret elections. All Norwegian citizens who are aged 18 or over are eligible to vote. Article 50 guarantees this right to men and women. However the right to vote may be qualified by law in the case of citizens who are resident overseas, mentally ill or in "a reduced level of consciousness," and the right to vote may be lost by convicted criminals (in circumstances prescribed by law) and by citizens who serve in a foreign government without the Norwegian government's consent.

There are 19 parliamentary constituencies. 150 seats are apportioned among the constituencies according to a calculation (made every eight years) based on their population density. Those members are elected by proportional representation. No party may take part in allocation of constituency seats unless it wins at least four percent of the vote in that constituency. The remaining 19 seats are allocated based on the nationwide results among parties having won at least four percent of the nationwide vote. No-one may be a member of the Storting unless they are eligible to vote. Judges of the Supreme Court and most government officials are not eligible for membership.

The members of the Council of State are not members of the Storting, but have the right to attend and take part on debate (but not to vote).

Members of the Storting are privileged from arrest during their attendance and while travelling to and from the Storting, "unless they are apprehended in public crimes." They are not accountable for the opinions they express in the Storting. The Storting shall meet in the capital every year on the first weekday of October, unless the King designates another town due to an emergency. The King may also summon the Storting at other times if necessary. Each new Storting is opened by the King, or a person delegated by him, who makes a speech about the state of the realm. The Storting meets in open session, and its decisions are published, unless it decides otherwise.

The Storting appoints a person (not a member) to supervise the public administration.

The Storting has the power to naturalise aliens.

Any member of the Storting or member of the Council of State may propose a bill. To become law, a bill must be debated twice, with at least three days between each debate, and then presented to the King for his assent. If the Kings signs it, it becomes law (and it is then published under the Seal of the Realm). The King may veto a bill, but his veto may be overridden if the bill is passed in the same form by the next elected Storting.

Article 85 states that "Any person who obeys an order the purpose of which is to disturb the liberty and security of the Storting is thereby guilty of treason against the country."

Chapter D (Articles 86 to 91) vests the judicial power in a Supreme Court and a Court of Impeachment.

The Supreme Court consists of a President and at least four other members, who must be at least 30 years of age. The Supreme Court's decisions are final and cannot be appealed.

The Court of Impeachment hears proceedings brought by the Storting against members of the Storting, members of the Council of State and members of the Supreme Court "for criminal or other unlawful conduct." The Court consists of the five longest-serving permanent members of the Supreme Court, including its President (who also presides over this court), and six other members elected by the Storting for six years. A member of the Storting or of the Council of State may not be elected to the Court.

Chapter E (Articles 92 to 113) sets out various human rights. Article 95 requires the state authorities to ensure the independence of the courts and the judges. Article 108 requires the state authorities to help the Sami people preserve their language, culture and way of life.

Chapter F (Articles 114 to 121) makes various other provisions, including for amendment of the Constitution.

To be eligible for high office, a person must not only be a Norwegian citizen but also speak Norwegian and meet certain other requirements. Citizens may be required to serve in defence of the country for a specified time. The national flag is to be prescribed by law. No new titles of nobility may be created.

Under Article 121, amendments to the Constitution may be proposed to the first, second or third annual Storting following a general election. If passed by two thirds of the Storting, the amendment must be signed by the King and by the Secretary to the Storting, and published. But an amendment must not "contradict the principles embodied in" the Constitution, or "alter the spirit of the Constitution."

== See also ==
- History of Norway
  - History of Jews in Norway
- Riksforsamlingen
