= Thaulow =

Thaulow is a Norwegian surname shared by several notable people:

- Carl Thaulow (1875–1942), Norwegian sailor
- Frits Thaulow (1847–1906), Norwegian painter
- Harald Thaulow (1815–1881), Norwegian pharmacist
- Heinrich Arnold Thaulow (1808–1894), Norwegian physician
- Nicoline Thaulow, (1807–1885), Norwegian writer
- Johan Fredrik Thaulow (1840–1912), Norwegian physician
- Moritz Christian Julius Thaulow (1812–1850), Norwegian chemist
- Sven Thaulow (1905–1967), Norwegian swimmer
