= Niels Andreas Vibe =

Norwegian military officer

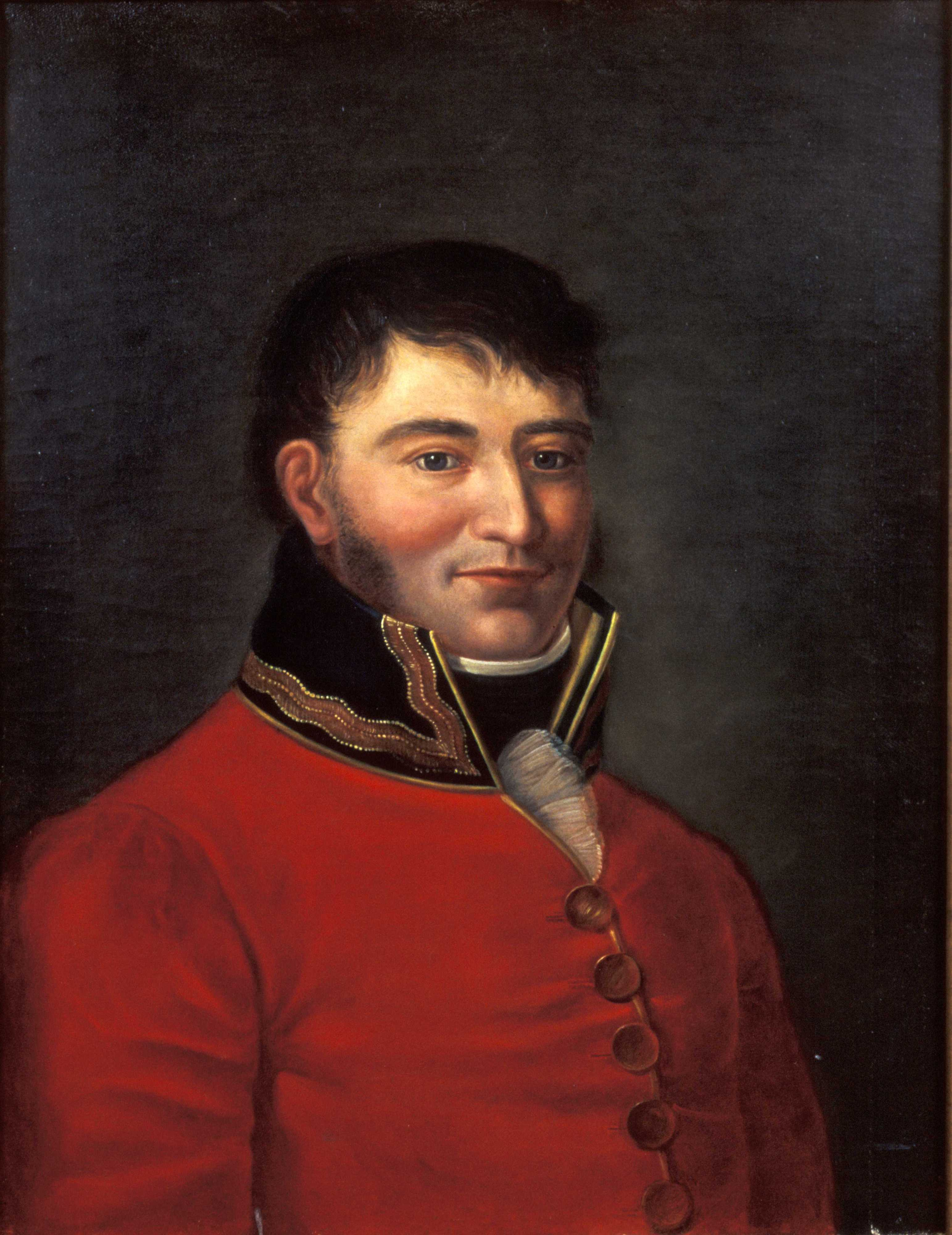
Niels Andreas Vibe painted by Jacob Munch.

Niels Andreas Vibe (12 July 1759 – 9 September 1814) was a Norwegian military officer and civil and royal servant. He served as County Governor of Nordre Bergenhus Amt from 1802 to 1811, as General War Commissioner of Norway from 1811 to 1814, and as chamberlain to King Christian Frederick of Norway from 1814.

He was born in Rollag as a son of Major Johan Christian Vibe (1716–1764) and Anne Cathrine Pihl (1725–1773). He was a brother of Johan Vibe and Ditlev Wibe. In October 1795 in Christianssand he married Margery Kierulf (1775–1852). They had the son Ludvig Vibe and the daughter Henriette Gislesen. Another daughter Nicoline Vibe married Heinrich Arnold Thaulow, who was her second cousin. Niels Andreas Vibe was also a great-grandfather of Henrik Dedichen and Carl Looft.

He graduated from the Free School of Mathematics in 1780, and started serving in a dragoon regiment. Already from 1781 he worked for the institution that many years later became known as the Norwegian Mapping and Cadastre Authority, notably with triangulation. He became Commissary of War in Vesterlenske distrikt in 1795, and in the Diocese of Christianssand in 1798. From 1802 to 1811 he served as County Governor of Nordre Bergenhus Amt. In 1810 he founded the Western Norway branch of the Royal Norwegian Society for Development. He had formerly been a member of the Norwegian Society, and was also an active member and honorary member of Det nyttige Selskab and a singer in the Bergen Philharmonic Orchestra. From 1811 to 1814 he was Commissary of War for the whole of Norway, and from May 1814 to his death he served as chamberlain for King Christian Frederick of Norway. Vibe died in September 1814 in Christiania.

Government offices
| Preceded by Andreas Hiort | County Governor of Nordre Bergenhus amt 1802–1811 | Succeeded by Herman Gerhard Treschow (Hilmar Meincke Krohg was appointed after Vibe, but he never served.) |
