= Aagot Benterud =

Norwegian literary historian (1901–1975)

Aagot Benterud (née Garnaas; 1901–1975) was a Norwegian literary historian and literary critic. She was born in Tønsberg, Norway. Benterud published Henrik Wergelands religiøse utvikling ('Henrik Wergeland's religious development', 1943), Camilla Collett. En skjebne og et livsverk ('Camilla Collett. A destiny and a life's work', 1947), and Kvinnenes kamp for menneskerettighetene ('Women's fight for human rights', 1954).

She was a member of the working committee that led to the founding of the Norwegian Church Academies in 1956, an ecumenical movement intended to foster dialog between different faith and cultural backgrounds. Benterud was a literary critic for the newspaper Vårt Land.

She died in Tønsberg in 1975.
