= Harald Thaulow =

Norwegian pharmacist

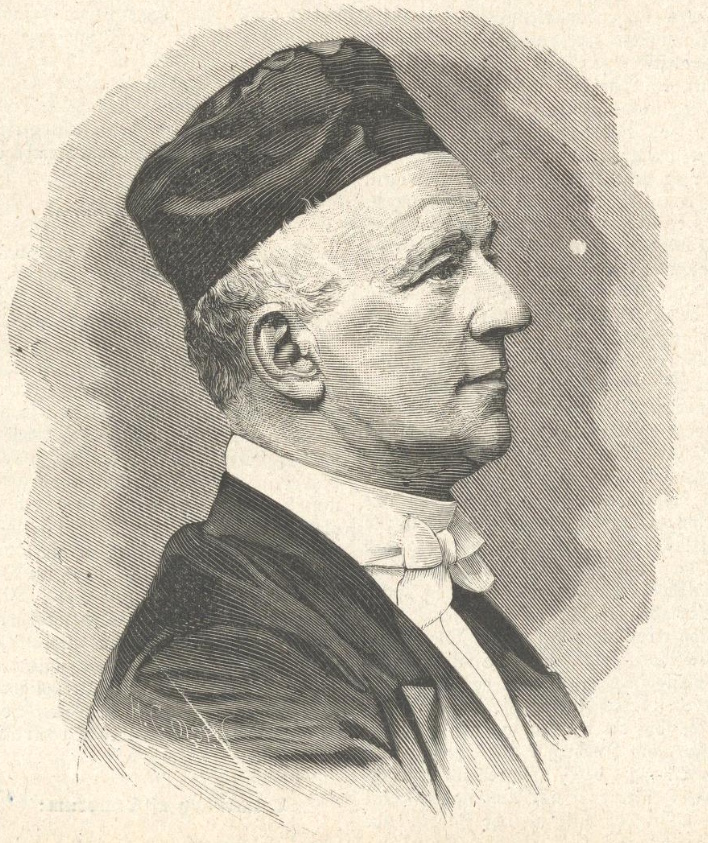
- Born: 30 June 1815; Duchy of Schleswig
- Died: 11 March 1881 (aged 65); Kristiania, Norway
- Occupation: Pharmacist
- Children: Frits Thaulow
- Relatives: Heinrich Arnold Thaulow (brother); Moritz Christian Julius Thaulow (brother); Jacob Munch (father-in-law); Henrik Wergeland (cousin); Camilla Collett (cousin); Joseph Frantz Oscar Wergeland (cousin); Johan Fredrik Thaulow (nephew); Else Frölich (granddaughter)

Harald Thaulow (30 June 1815 – 11 March 1881) was a Norwegian pharmacist.

== Biography ==
Harald Conrad Thaulow was born in the Duchy of Schleswig, at that time a dominion of the Danish crown. He was the son of Johan Frederik Thaulow (1768–1833) and Caroline Henriette Tugendreich Looft (1777–1852). His father was both a military officer and physician. He was a brother of Heinrich Arnold Thaulow and Moritz Christian Julius Thaulow, and a cousin of Henrik Wergeland, Camilla Collett and Joseph Frantz Oscar Wergeland.

He was an apprentice chemist in Oldenburg (1832–34) and at Altona (1834–36). He became a student at the University of Kiel in 1836 and traveled the same year to Christiania (now Oslo). Here he became an assistant to Jens Jacob Keyser, professor of physics and chemistry at the new University in Christiania (1836 to 1842). He took adjunct examination in 1839 and in 1843 received a license to operate a pharmacy.

He established the pharmacy Løveapoteket in Christiania in 1842. The pharmacy made Thaulow very wealthy. Among his works was a treatment from 1853, on the influence of isomorphism and isometry on the development of natural sciences, for which he was awarded the Crown Prince's gold medal. He was strongly committed to the issue of improving the education and professionalism of pharmacists. In 1858, Thaulow established a pharmacist association in Christiania. Thaulow was granted an honorary doctorate at the University of Kiel, an honorary member of Hamburger Apothekerverein, Goethe Vaterhaus in Frankfurt am Main and of several scientific societies.

== Personal life ==
He was married in 1844, with Nicoline Munch (1821–1871), daughter of painter Jacob Munch. They had six children, of whom the painter Frits Thaulow was the most notable. His granddaughter was the Norwegian-Danish silent film actor Else Frölich (daughter of Frits Thaulow).
