= Sommerfelt =

Sommerfelt is a Norwegian surname. Notable people with the surname include:

- Aimée Sommerfelt (1892–1975), Norwegian children's books author
- Alf Sommerfelt (1892–1965), Norwegian linguist
- Ole Hannibal Sommerfelt (1753–1821), Norwegian jurist, civil servant, and topographer

== See also ==
- Sommerfeld (disambiguation)
