= Moritz Christian Julius Thaulow =

Norwegian chemist

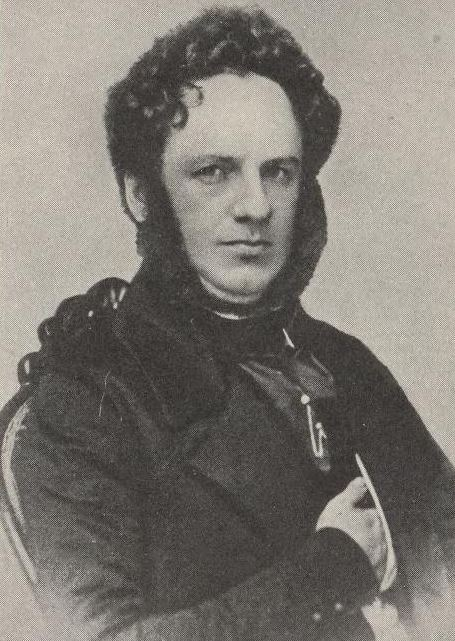
- Born: 19 November 1812; Duchy of Schleswig
- Died: 20 July 1850 (aged 37); Christiania, Norway
- Occupation: Chemist
- Children: Johan Fredrik Thaulow
- Relatives: Heinrich Arnold Thaulow (brother); Harald Thaulow (brother); Nicolai Wergeland (uncle); Henrik Wergeland (cousin); Camilla Collett (cousin); Joseph Frantz Oscar Wergeland (cousin); Axel Aubert (grandson)

Moritz Christian Julius Thaulow (19 November 1812 – 20 July 1850) was a Norwegian chemist.

Thaulow was born in the Duchy of Schleswig to Johan Frederik Thaulow (1768–1833) and Caroline Henriette Tugendreich Looft. He was a brother of Heinrich Arnold Thaulow and Harald Thaulow, and a cousin of Henrik Wergeland and Camilla Collett. In 1839 he married Margreta Elisabeth Juel, and among their children was physician Johan Fredrik Thaulow and Hilda Thaulow, the mother of chemist Axel Aubert.

He studied chemistry in Kiel, and came to Christiania in 1832. After further studies in Copenhagen, Stockholm, Berlin, Giessen and Paris, he returned to the university in Christiania. He was appointed professor in chemistry in 1844.
