= Henrik Arnold Thaulow =

Henrik Arnold Thaulow can refer to:

- Henrik Arnold Thaulow Dedichen, psychiatrist
- Henrik Arnold Thaulow Wergeland, writer
