= Ludvig Vibe =

Norwegian classical philologist and educator

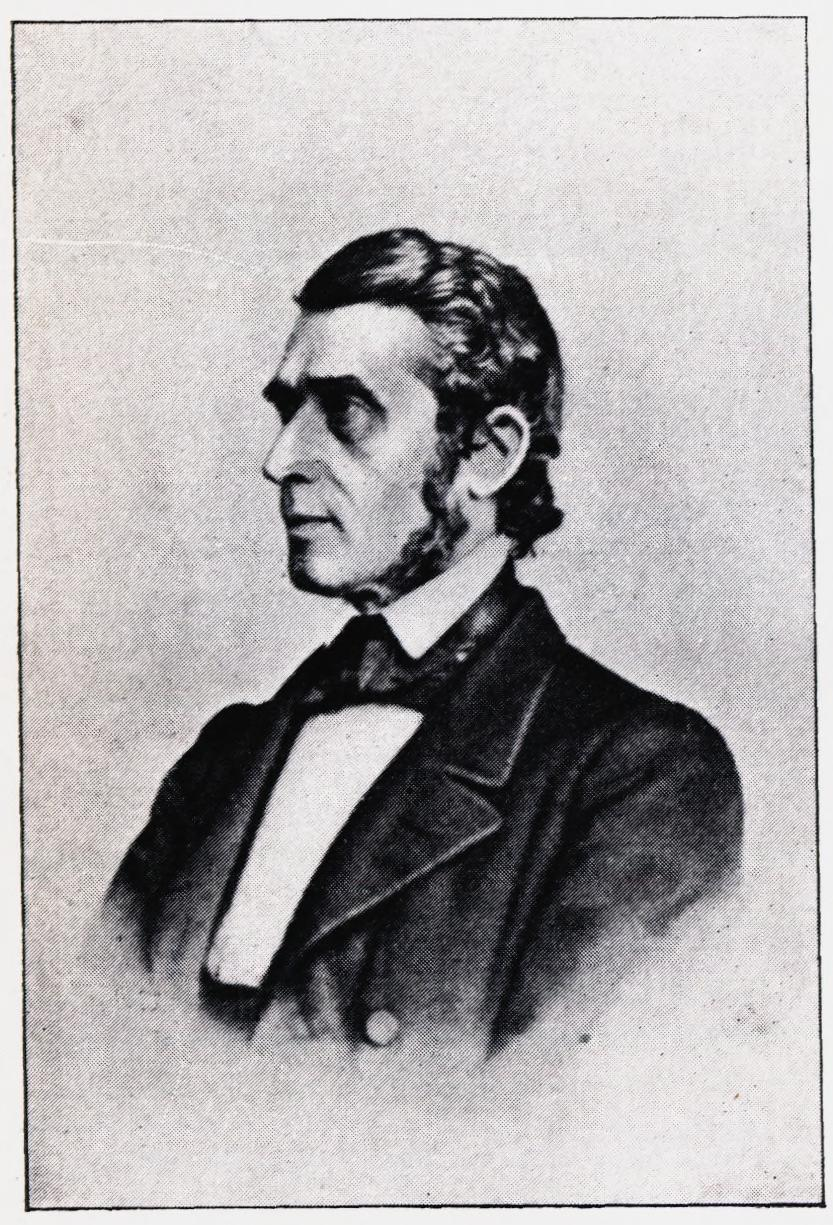
Ludvig Vibe

Frederik Ludvig Vibe (26 September 1803 – 21 June 1881) was a Norwegian classical philologist and educator. He was Professor of Greek language at the Royal Frederick University from 1838.

Vibe was born in Bergen as a son of County Governor, General War Commissioner and chamberlain Niels Andreas Vibe (1759–1814) and Margery Kierulff (1775–1852). He was a nephew of Johan Vibe and Ditlev Wibe, brother of Henriette Gislesen, brother-in-law of Heinrich Arnold Thaulow and second cousin of Ludvig Cæsar Martin Aubert. The family moved to Christiania in 1811.

Vibe took his examen artium in 1820, and graduated from the Royal Frederick University with the cand.philol. degree in 1827. In 1829, he was hired as a Latin teacher at Christiania Cathedral School. Vibe was a lecturer in Greek at the University from 1830, and was promoted to professor in 1838. He is known for translating The Birds and Prometheus Bound, and also for a work on Spartan governance named Hvad var Spartas Ekklesi?. Vibe was, however, most interested in preserving the position of the classical languages in society. He was an advisor to politician Hans Riddervold in the late 1840s, and also chaired the public commission Skolekommisjonen av 1847. In 1848, Vibe started the conservative newspaper Christiania-Posten with Carl Arntzen, and also left the university to become principal of Christiania Cathedral School.

Vibe was a conservatist, whereas commission member Hartvig Nissen was a reformer; the third commission member was Ludvig Cæsar Martin Aubert. In general, Vibe was allied with Frederik Moltke Bugge, whereas other positions like Anton Martin Schweigaard and Herman Foss favored the natural sciences. Around 1850 natural sciences were introduced in secondary schools in Norway, except for Christiania, Trondhjem and Bergen Cathedral School. During Vibe's career as principal at Christiania Cathedral School, the number of students fell. He fell ill after 1870, and was substituted with Emil Schreiner. It became clear that he could not return, and he retired in 1872.

Vibe was married to Ferdinanda Augusta Wilhelmine Steensgaard (1812–1898) from December 1833. He was a great-grandfather of Inger Alver Gløersen and Gunnar Fougner Høst. Vibe died in June 1881 in Kristiania.
