= Nicoline Thaulow =

Norwegian writer (1807–1885)

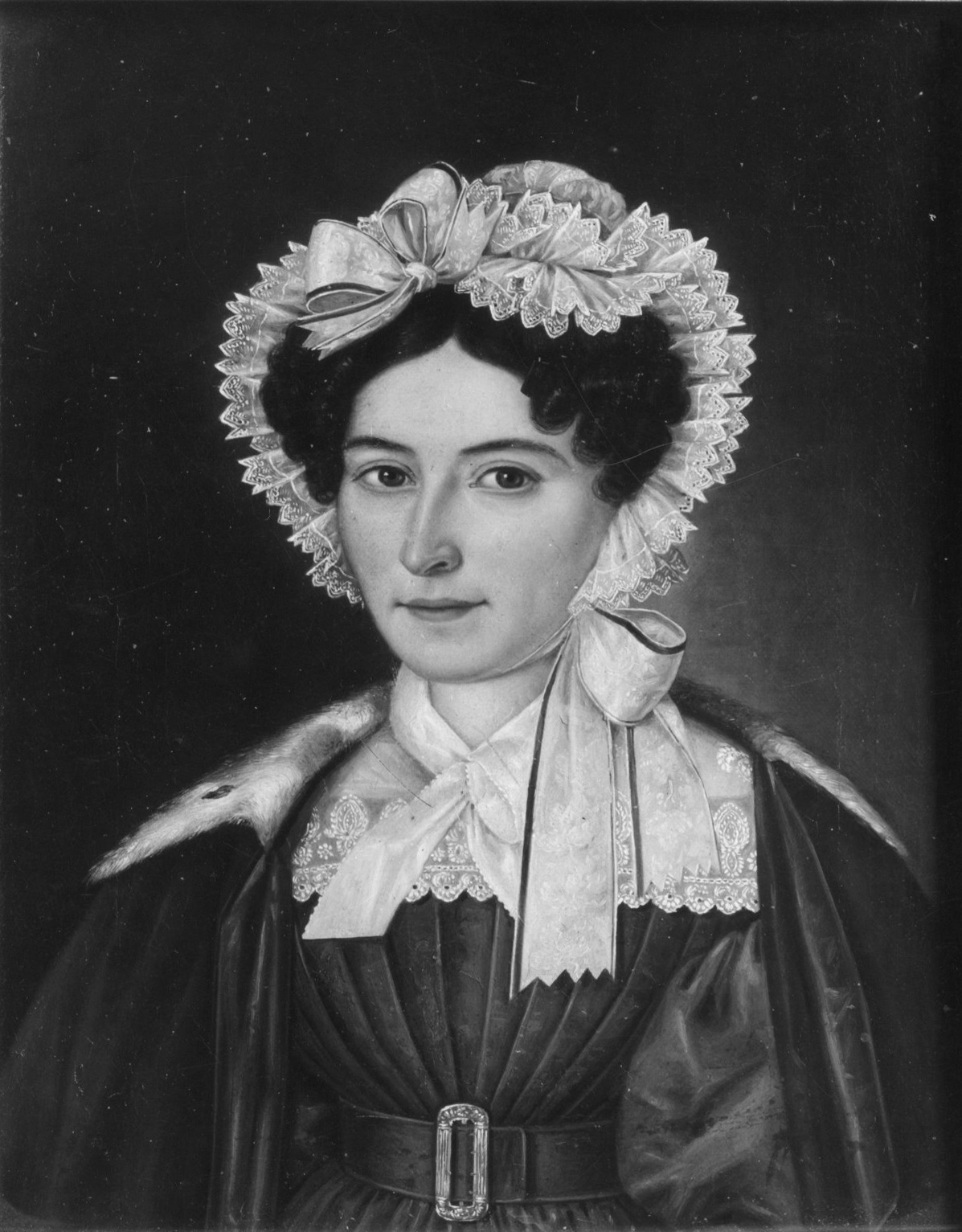
- Nicoline in 1833 by Peter Peterson
- Born: Nicoline Andrea Margrethe Vibe; 2 October 1807; Bergen, Norway
- Died: 10 August 1885 (aged 77); Modum, Norway
- Occupation: Writer
- Spouse: Heinrich Arnold Thaulow (m. 1834)
- Parents: Niels Andreas Vibe (father); Margery Kierulf (mother)
- Relatives: Ludvig Vibe (brother); Henriette Gislesen (sister); Henrik Dedichen (grandson)

Nicoline Andrea Margrethe Thaulow (2 October 1807 – 10 August 1885) was a Norwegian writer and the wife of medical doctor Heinrich Arnold Thaulow, and daughter of Niels Vibe.

== Life and work ==
Nicoline Thaulow was born in Bergen, and when her father became General War Commissioner in 1811 and moved to Christiania, the family moved there with him. When his father died in 1814, major general Benoni d'Aubert took care of the survivors. The young Nicoline showed great talent for science, and wrote her own stories and narratives. Her triplets Camilla and Henrik Wergeland also occasionally stayed in the house at Akershus Fortress. After she married Heinrich Arnold Thaulow, she lived in Sandefjord and at Modum, where her husband established his two spa establishments. Nicoline gained the nickname "Line" short for her name.

In 1861, Thaulow published the novel Dream and Reality – Images of Life, a book in two volumes. The novel was published anonymously, and by the literary historian Francis Bull it was described as a kind of post against the thinking against Camilla Collett's Amtmandens Døttre, where it celebrates women's renunciation and piety. The novel later also came in a German translation. Only in 2014 was the book published with the author's name on the cover.

== Family ==
Nicoline Thaulow was the daughter of amtmann in Nordre Bergenhus amt and chamberlain Niels Andreas Vibe (1759–1814) and Margery Kierulf (1775–1852). She was the sister of major and cartographer Andreas Vibe (1801–1860), professor Frederik Ludvig Vibe (1803–1881) and Henriette Gislesen (1809–1859). She was married on 7 January 1834 in Vår Frelsers kirke in Christiania with her third husband, the doctor and businessman Heinrich Arnold Thaulow (1808–1894).
