= Henriette Gislesen =

Norwegian writer

Henriette Jakobine Martine Gislesen, née Vibe (9 April 1809 – 20 May 1859) was a Norwegian writer.

== Biography ==
Gislesen was born in Bergen, Norway. She was the sixth of eight children born to Niels Andreas Vibe (1759–1814) and Margery Kierulff (1775–1852). Her notable siblings were Ludvig Vibe and Nicoline Thaulow. Her father served as County Governor of Nordre Bergenhus Amt. Gislesen was a sister of Ludvig Vibe, sister-in-law of Heinrich Arnold Thaulow and second cousin of Ludvig Cæsar Martin Aubert. When she was two years old, her family moved to Christiania in 1811 when her father was made General War Commissioner of Norway. Gislesen's father died when Henriette was five years old and her family established residence with Benoni Aubert (1768–1832) who was married to a cousin of her mother.

Gislesen settled in Eiker near Drammen where she lived from 1844 to 1853. In 1851, she came into contact with Andreas Hauge, son of Hans Nielsen Hauge and founder of the Norwegian Missionary Society. Subsequently, she became involved in missionary work. Together with Gustava Kielland, Gislesen was one of the most important spreaders of missionary interest among women. After some years she also debuted as a moralistic writer. In 1843 she released the book En Moders veiledende Ord til sin Datter ("A Mother's Guiding Words to her Daughter"). Gislesen also wrote poems and stories that were published in newspapers and magazines. Like most female writers in her contemporary, she wrote anonymously. In time, Gislesen used her real name and published several books including textbooks for missionaries. Her memoirs were published posthumously in 1861, and a collection of her letters was published in 1885.

== Personal life ==
Gislesen was married twice. In April 1829, she married her second cousin, Christian Frederik Glückstad (1803-1838). He died after nine years of marriage in 1838. In 1854, she married clergyman Knud Gislesen (1801-1860). He would later become Bishop of the Diocese of Tromsø. From 1856, they lived in Tromsø where Gislesen died in May 1859.

== Publications ==
- En moders veiledende ord til sin datter, 1843
- Erindringer fra det betydningsfuldeste Aar i mit Liv, 1861
- Meine Bekehrung, 1862
- Ein Bild aus der norwegischen Kirche, 1890
