= Inger Alver Gløersen =

Norwegian smallholder and writer (1892–1982)

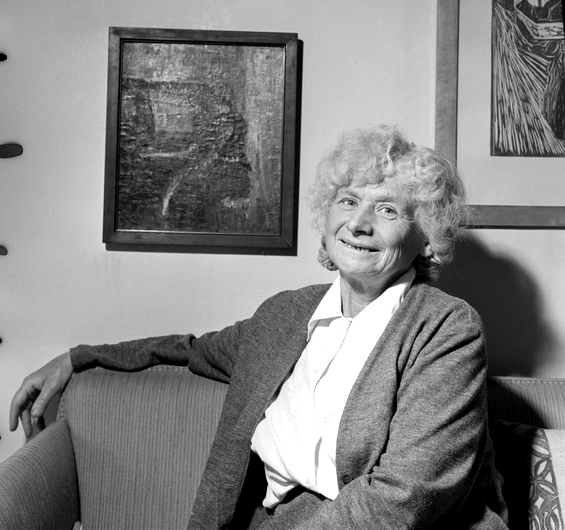
Inger Alver Gløersen (1956)

Inger Wenche Alver Gløersen (15 May 1892 – 2 March 1982) was a Norwegian smallholder and writer.

== Biography ==
She was born in Fåberg Municipality to teacher Johan Ludvig Alver (1848–1897) and Isabella Vibe (1870–1937). She was a great-granddaughter of Ludvig Vibe and a niece of Amalie Skram, née Amalie Alver. Her family lived in Kongsberg and Kristiania during her youth. After the death of her father, her mother married Sigurd Høst (1866–1939). In 1900, the family moved to Bergen. In the same year, she became a half-sister of the newly born Gunnar Høst, who later married Else Høst.

Inger Alver finished middle school in Bergen before studying briefly at Oxford University. In 1919, in Canada she married forester Toralf Gløersen (1884–1959), who was a nephew of painter Jacob Gløersen and first cousin once removed of writer Ole Kristian Gløersen. In the 1920s, she returned to Norway and settled at the farm Glenne in Borre, with only 42 decares of crop. The marriage was dissolved, but she lived together with her son, who worked at the farm and as manager of the museum in Åsgårdstrand.

After turning sixty years old, Inger Alver Gløersen started writing books. Her literary début was Nikolai Astrup (1954, about Nikolai Astrup), and her best-known book is Den Munch jeg møtte (1956, about Edvard Munch). She later released Mefisto i Djævelklubben, Boken om maleren Ravensberg (1958, about Ludvig Ravensberg) and Min faster Amalie Skram (1965, about Amalie Skram). All books were based on personal experiences. She also wrote in magazines like Urd and Frisprog. She died in March 1982 in Borre.
