= Gislesen =

Gislesen is a Norwegian surname. Notable people with the surname include:

- Henriette Gislesen (1809–1859), Norwegian writer
- Knud Gislesen (1801–1860), Norwegian teacher, clergyman and author
