= Statsborgeren =

Norwegian magazine (1831–1837)

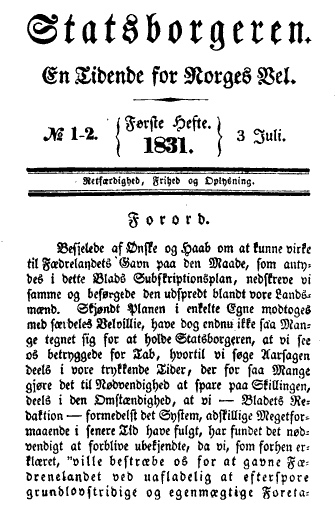
- Cover page dated 3 July 1831
- Editor: Peder Soelvold; Henrik Wergeland
- Categories: Political magazine
- Founder: Peder Soelvold
- Founded: 1831
- Final issue: 1837
- Country: Norway
- Based in: Oslo
- Language: Norwegian

Statsborgeren (Norwegian: The Citizen) was a political magazine which was published in Oslo in the period 1831–1937. It was one of the opposition publications.

== History and profile ==
Statsborgeren was founded by Peder Soelvold in 1831. The editor of the paper was also Peder Soelvold between 1831 and 1835. The magazine criticized the government, ruling bureaucracy and fought for the rights of farmers. Due to tensions with the government Peder Soelvold had to resign from the post, and Henrik Wergeland replaced him as the editor of Statsborgeren. Wergeland edited the magazine until 1837 when it folded.
