= Jøden (1842) =

1842 poetry collection by Henrik Wergeland

- Jøden. Ni blomstrende Torneqviste by Henrik Wergeland, published in 1842
- Author: Henrik Wergeland
- Language: Norwegian
- Publisher: Lehmannske Bogtrykkeri
- Publication date: 1842
- Publication place: Norway

Jøden. Ni blomstrende Torneqviste (The Jew. Nine Blossoming Briar Shoots) is a collection of poems by Henrik Wergeland, published in April 1842, as a contribution to the struggle for the Jews' right to reside in Norway. The book is a collection of poems and short prose, and it opens with the following dedication:

Norges Storting helliges disse Medfölelsens Udgydelser for den berömte, fortjente, ulykkelige Green af Menneskeslægten, hvis fremtidige Forhold til Fædrelandet det skal afgjöre. Quod felix patriæ faustumque sit!

These sympathetic outpourings favoring the famous, deserving, unhappy branch of humanity are dedicated to Norway's Parliament, which must decide its future relationship to the Fatherland. May it bring good luck and happiness to the Nation!

The collection contains some of Wergeland's best-known poems. The first and last poem in the collection address general issues related to the fight for what is right, and the conviction that it is useful, even if the visible results can often seem small and the enemy invincible. Other parts of the work, such as "De tre" (The Three), are about religious tolerance, and here the three religions Judaism, Christianity, and Islam are placed next to each other, and the three religious leaders get to praise God in their own way, in parallel, and in full reconciliation.

The remainder of the poems deal with the specific problems of the Jews, and they highlight the nobility of individuals, such as "Juleaftenen" (Christmas Eve). This poem is the only one of Wergeland's works to have been made into a film. It was dramatized as the 1912 German silent film Isaak, der Handelsjude.

"Skibbrudet" (The Shipwreck) is based on an actual event, when a young Jew was thrown ashore on the coast of Hordaland in 1841, and the authorities reacted by sending him out again, with faster processing than any asylum seeker today would have received. This upset Wergeland.

The collection is perhaps the first book in Norwegian literature with a clear anti-racist message.

== Content ==
The volume contains the following poems and other material:

- "I. Sandhedens Armée" (1. The Army of Truth)
- "II. De tre" (2. The Three)
- "III. Skibbrudet" (3. The Shipwreck)
- "IV. Juleaftenen" (4. Christmas Eve)
- "V. Den franske Garde over sin Sergeant Jöden Michaël" (5. The French Guardsmen Mourning Their Sergeant, the Jew Michaël)
- "VI. Jödinden" (6. The Jewess)
- "VII. Barnet" (7. The Child)
- "VIII. Moses paa Bjerget" (8. Moses on the Mountain)
- "IX. Tidselskjægplukkeren" (9. The Thistledown-Gatherer)
- "Natur- og Menneske-Kjærlighed" (Love for Nature and Mankind)

== See also ==
- History of the Jews in Norway
