= Heinrich Arnold Thaulow =

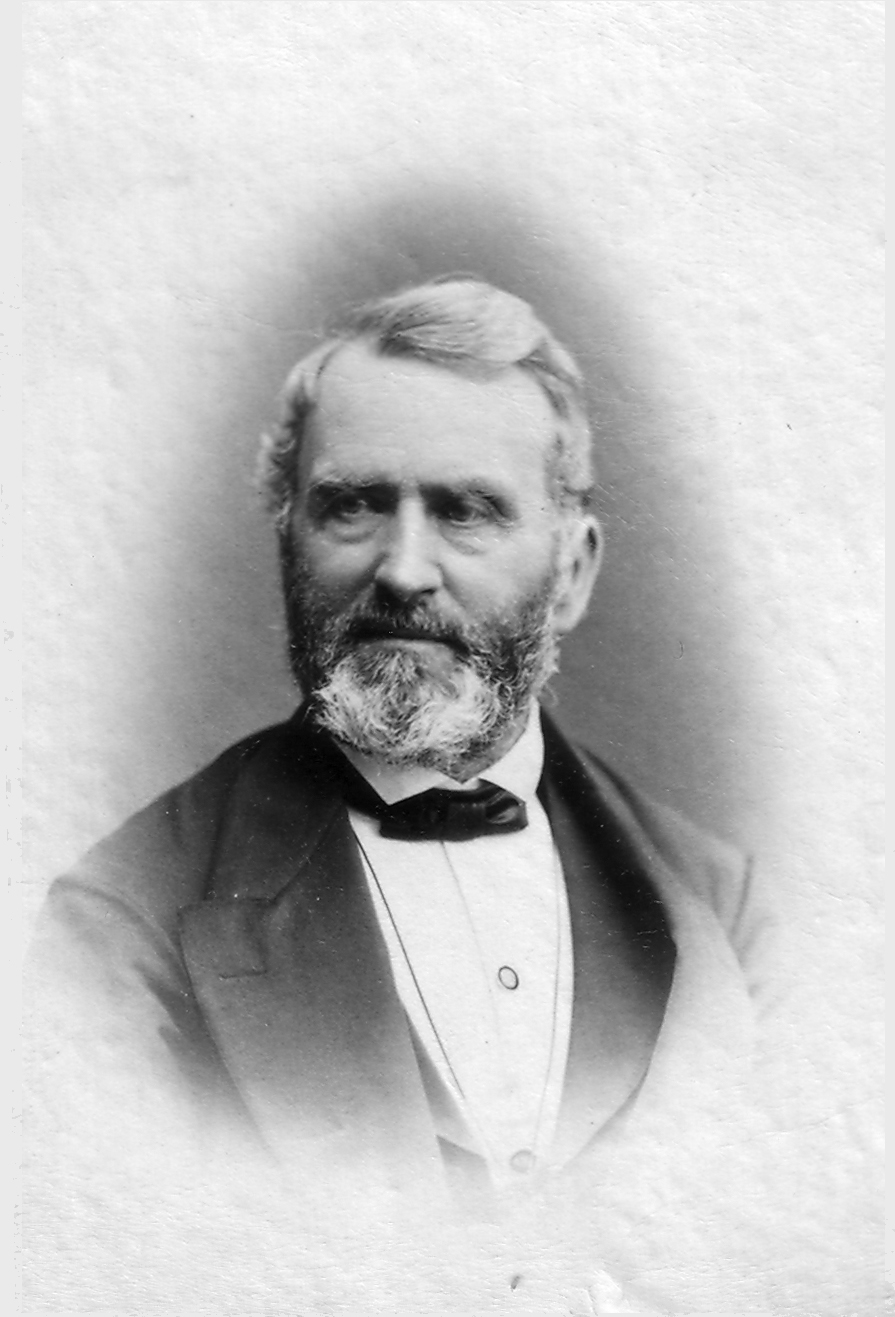
- Born: 10 June 1808; Duchy of Schleswig
- Died: 19 August 1894 (aged 86); Modum, Norway
- Occupation: Physician
- Spouse: Nicoline Vibe (m. 1834; died 1885)
- Relatives: Harald Thaulow (brother); Moritz Christian Julius Thaulow (brother); Frits Thaulow (nephew); Niels Andreas Vibe (father-in-law); Henrik Dedichen (grandson); Henrik Wergeland (cousin); Camilla Collett (cousin); Joseph Frantz Oscar Wergeland (cousin); Johan Fredrik Thaulow (nephew)

Heinrich Arnold Thaulow (10 June 1808 – 19 August 1894) was a physician known for the introduction of balneotherapy in Norway. Thaulow founded Sandefjord Spa in Sandefjord in 1837. He was Sandefjord's first physician. He also made the first donation to the city in 1875, when the Thaulow fountain was donated to the city. The fountain is located at Christopher Hvidts Plass in the city center of Sandefjord.

== Biography ==
Thaulow was born in the Duchy of Schleswig to Johan Frederik Thaulow (1768–1833) and Caroline Henriette Tugendreich Looft. He was a brother of Harald Thaulow, and a cousin of Henrik Wergeland, Camilla Collett and Joseph Frantz Oscar Wergeland. In 1834 he married Nicoline Vibe, and was thus son-in-law of Niels Andreas Vibe. He was a grandfather of psychiatrist Henrik Dedichen and physician Carl Looft.

Thaulow started his studies at the University of Kiel, but continued from 1830 at the University of Christiania (now University of Oslo) where he graduated in 1833. He settled at Sandefjord, where in 1837, he set up the spa Sandefjord Bad. From 1839 until 1867, he held the position of doctor for Blaafarveværket at Åmot in Modum. From 1849 he also held the position of district doctor for Ringerike. In 1857, he founded Modum Bads which developed into a private hospital operation for patients with mental and physical disorders.

Thaulow won national recognition as a balneologist and his treatment centers became popular destinations. He was decorated Knight of the Order of St. Olav in 1870, and was a Knight of the Order of the Polar Star.
