= Aimée Sommerfelt =

Norwegian writer

- Born: Nicoline Aimée Dedichen; 2 April 1892; Oslo, Norway
- Died: 7 August 1975 (aged 83); Oslo, Norway
- Spouse: Alf Sommerfelt
- Relatives: Henrik Arnold Thaulow Dedichen (father); Antoinette Pauline Marie Nyblin (mother)
- Writing career
- Genres: children's books, young adult fiction
- Notable work: The Road to Agra
- Notable awards: Jane Addams Children's Book Award, Josette Frank Award

Aimée Sommerfelt (née Dedichen; 8 April 1892 – 7 August 1975) was a Norwegian writer of numerous children's books and young adult novels.

== Biography ==
She was born as Nicoline Aimée Dedichen, the daughter of a psychiatrist, Henrik Arnold Thaulow Dedichen (not to be confused with the writer Henrik Arnold Thaulow Wergeland, his maternal grandfather's first cousin) and Antoinette Pauline Marie "Toinon" Nyblin (1861–1941) .

She was most famous for her 1959 work The Road to Agra. In 1961, it became her first book to be published in the United States, being translated into English by Evelyn Ramsden. Her books usually highlighted issues of social justice. They placed child protagonists in extremely difficult circumstances, such as poverty and wartime.

She married linguist Alf Sommerfelt.

She became blind late in her life.

== Awards and honours ==
For The Road to Agra, Sommerfelt won the Jane Addams Children's Book Award and the Josette Frank Award.

== Bibliography ==
- Miriam (1950)
- The Road to Agra (1959) (translated into English by Evelyn Ramsden in 1961)
- The White Bungalow (1962), sequel to The Road to Agra
- My Name Is Pablo (1964)
- No Easy Way (1967)
