= Sigurd Høst =

Norwegian educationalist and textbook writer (1866–1939)

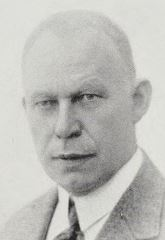
- Høst in 1915
- Born: 22 January 1866; Florø, Norway
- Died: 21 August 1939 (aged 73)
- Occupations: Educationalist; Textbook writer
- Children: Gunnar Høst
- Relatives: Inger Alver Gløersen (stepdaughter); Else Høst (daughter-in-law)
- Sigurd Høst's voice Høst reading Akershus by Henrik Ibsen. Recorded 1914

Sigurd Høst (22 January 1866 – 21 August 1939) was a Norwegian educationalist and textbook writer.

== Biography ==
Høst was born in Florø to physician Ude Jacob Høst (1834-1918) and Lorentze Schulrud (1837–99). He graduated as philologist in 1891, and worked as teacher and lecture at several private schools in Kristiania (now Oslo). He served as headmaster of the Bergen Cathedral School from 1907, and of the Christiania Cathedral School from 1915. From 1921 to 1922 he lectured at the University of Sorbonne in Paris, and from 1923 to 1926 he lectured at the University of Oslo.

His textbooks Lærebog i fransk for begyndere from 1896 and Franske læsestykker for gymnasiet from 1897 were used in secondary schools for more than fifty years. He also wrote Lærebok i verdenshistorie for middelskolen from 1909, a textbook in world history which saw long-term use. Høst is also known as friend and early sales agent for the painters Nikolai Astrup and Edvard Munch.

== Personal life ==
In 1897, he married Isabella Alver Vibe (1870–1937). He received the King's Medal of Merit (Kongens fortjenstmedalje) in gold in 1912. He was the father of philologist and literary historian Gunnar Høst and stepfather of writer Inger Alver Gløersen.
