= Gunnar Høst =

Norwegian philologist and literary historian (1900–1983)

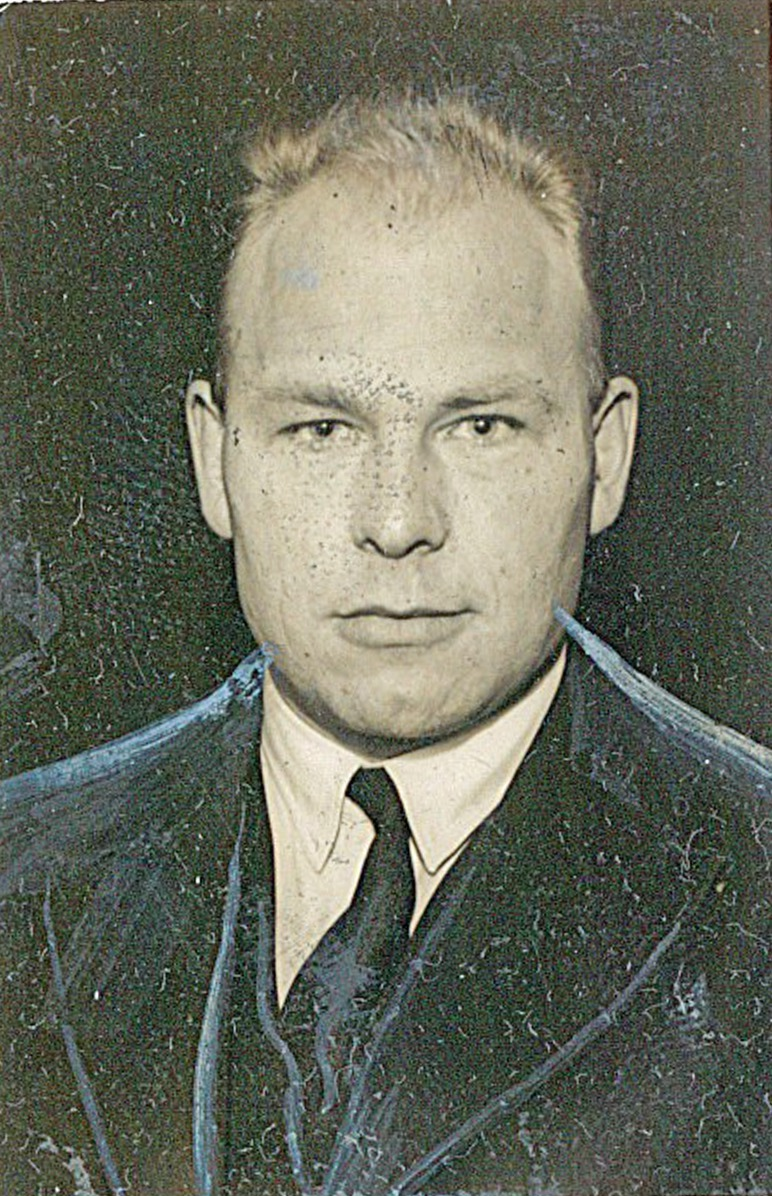
Gunnar Fougner Høst ca. 1930

Gunnar Fougner Høst (12 August 1900 – 5 August 1983) was a Norwegian philologist and literary historian. He was a lecturer at the University of Oslo from 1930 to 1968.

== Biography ==
He was born in Kristiania (now Oslo), Norway. He moved with his family to Bergen in 1907 and returned to Kristiania in 1915. He was a son of Sigurd Høst (1866–1939) and Isabella Vibe (1870–1937). He was a great-grandson of Ludvig Vibe, and a half-brother of Inger Alver Gløersen. He married literary researcher Else Marie Røysland (1908–1996) in 1931.

Høst took his examen artium in 1918, and graduated from the Royal Frederick University with the cand.philol. degree in 1925. He was a teacher at Trondhjem Cathedral School from 1925 to 1927, and at Sorbonne from 1927 to 1930. He worked at the Royal Frederick University from 1930, but was not promoted to lecturer until 1937. Together with his colleagues Peter Rokseth (1891-1945) and Charles Gobinot (1891-1954), he formed part of the French group at the university during the 1930s. He released the work L'œuvre de Jean Giraudoux about Jean Giraudoux in 1942, and it earned him the dr.philos. degree in 1945. He was promoted to docent in 1965, and retired in 1968. He also published a number of textbooks. His last book releases came in 1970 and 1971, co-written with his wife. He died in August 1983 in Oslo.

== Selected works ==
- Le livre du maître, 1947
- Franske lesestykker, 1954
- Fransk lesning I (with Else Høst), 1970
- Fransk lesning II (with Else Høst), 1971
