= The Road to Agra =

1959 children's novel by Aimée Sommerfelt

- First US edition (publ. Criterion Books, 1961)
- Author: Aimée Sommerfelt
- Original title: Veien til Agra
- Language: Norwegian
- Published: 1959
- Publication place: Norway

The Road to Agra (Norwegian: Veien til Agra) is a children's novel written by Aimée Sommerfelt and published in Norwegian in 1959. It is her most famous work and has been translated into 17 other languages.

Set in India, the book tells the story of 13-year-old Lalu and his 7-year-old sister Maya, who are on their way from Allahabad to Agra to seek help from doctors for Maya's grave eye disease, which is causing her to become blind. The journey to Agra is dusty, hot and exhausting, and at night the children are threatened by snakes and jackals. But the children keep their spirits up, because they have heard that the disease can be cured at the hospital in Agra. Along the way, they meet both good and bad people, and get an elephant ride. Ultimately, they reach their destination, and Maya is cured by European doctors.

The book was followed by a 1962 sequel, The White Bungalow, published in English in 1963.

== Bibliography ==
- Aimée Sommerfelt. The Road to Agra. New York, Criterion Books, 1961. Translated from Norwegian to English by Evelyn Ramsden.
