= Nicolai Wergeland =

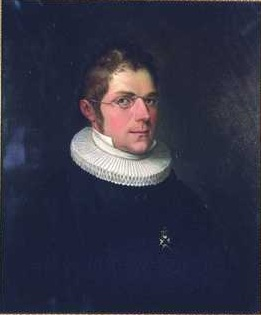
- Born: 9 November 1780; Hosanger, Norway
- Died: 25 March 1848 (aged 67)
- Occupations: Minister, writer and politician
- Known for: Member of the Norwegian Constituent Assembly in 1814
- Children: Camilla Collett; Henrik Wergeland; Joseph Frantz Oscar Wergeland

Nicolai Wergeland (9 November 1780 – 25 March 1848) was a Norwegian minister, writer and politician, and a member of the Norwegian Constituent Assembly at Eidsvoll Manor that wrote the Constitution of Norway on 17 May 1814. He was elected as one of two delegates from Kristiansand to the Eidsvoll Assembly in 1814. He represented the unionist side, and came very well prepared to Eidsvoll, bringing his own constitution draft. Along with him from Kristiansand came wholesaler Ole Clausen Mørch.

== Family ==
Wergeland's family hailed from the parish of Brekke in Sogn. His father was Halvor Lassesen, a teacher and parish clerk in Hosanger.

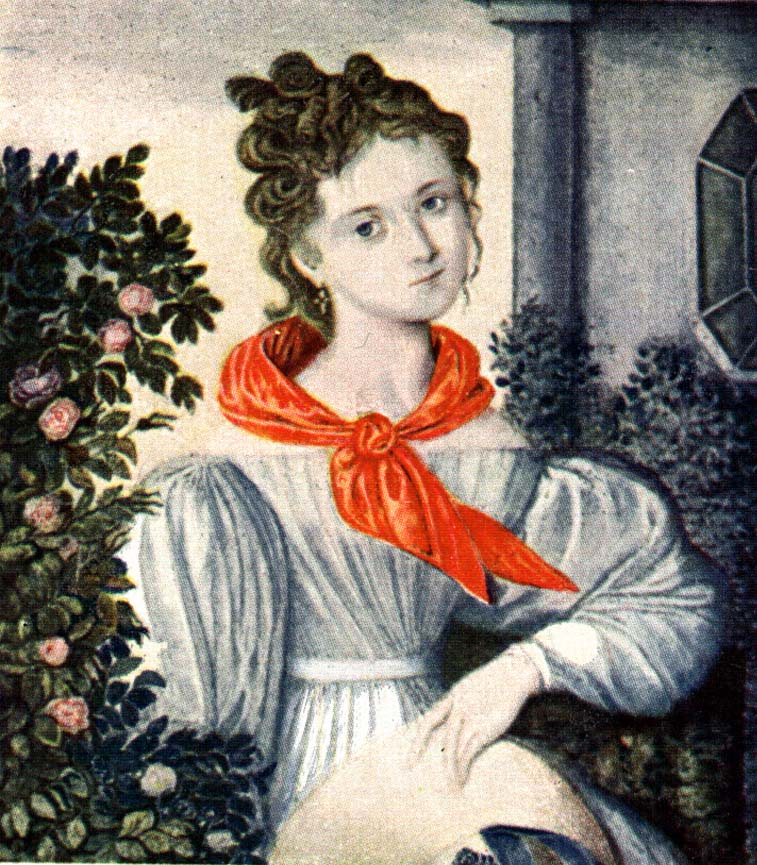
Feminist writer Camilla Collett, drawn by her father Nicolai Wergeland

Wergeland's daughter Camilla Collett, author of the novel Amtmandens døttre ("The Governor's Daughters", 1854, anonymously), is regarded as Norway's first feminist writer.

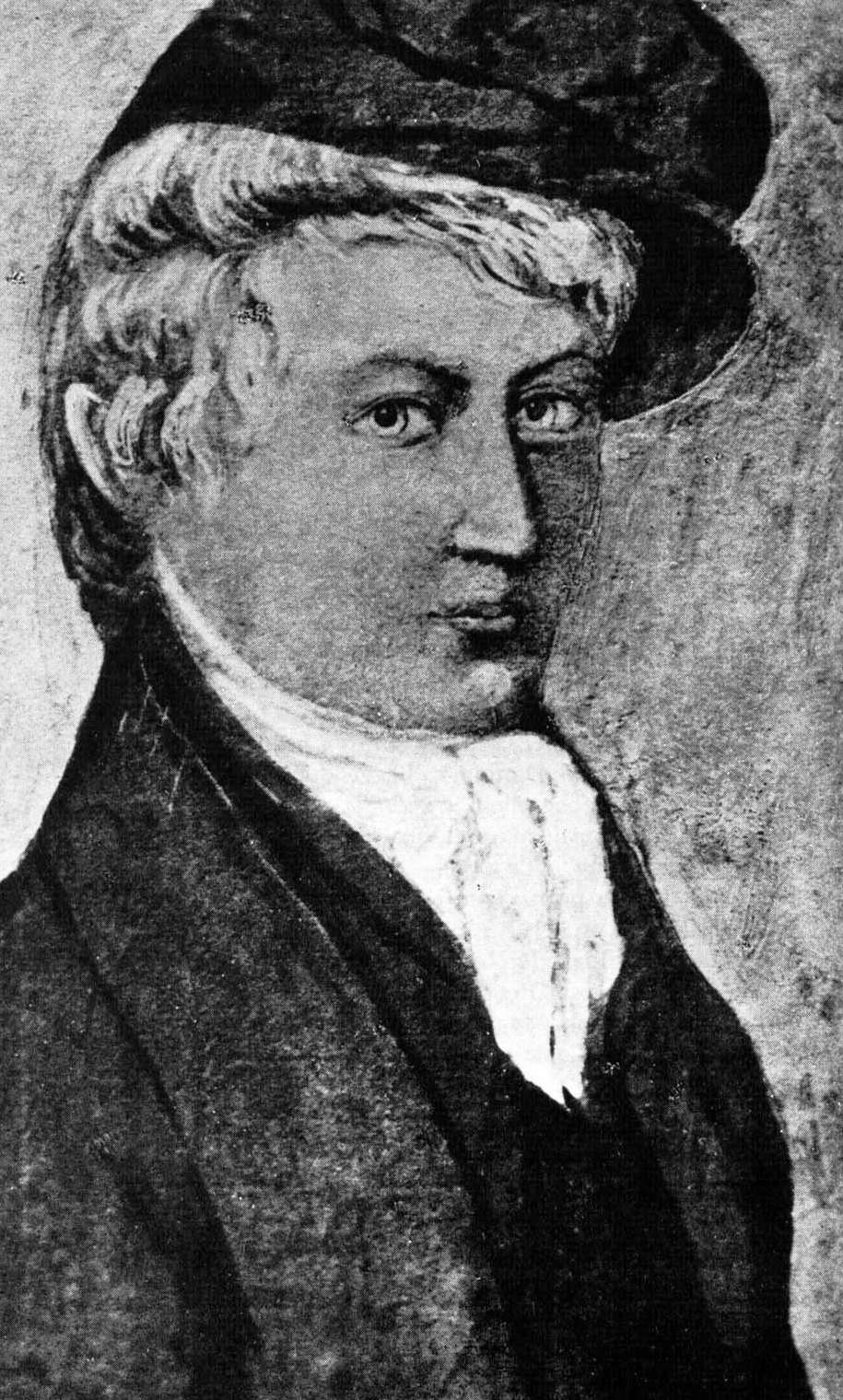
Poet Henrik Wergeland, drawn by his father Nicolai Wergeland

The son Henrik Wergeland is often characterized as Norway's national poet, and a symbol of the country's independence. Wergeland was also father of military officer Oscar Wergeland, and proprietor Harald Titus Alexis Wergeland. His nephew, mountaineer, lieutenant general and government minister Harald Nicolai Storm Wergeland grew up with the family, when the young mother, Wergeland's sister, became a widow.

== Career ==
Wergeland studied theology in Copenhagen. As he did not come from a wealthy family, his economic conditions were so difficult that he considered enlisting as a soldier. He became a cand.theol. in 1803, served as a curate in Kristiansand from 1812, a vicar to Eidsvold from 1816, and rural dean in Eidsvold from 1822.

He became well known for winning a contest arranged by the Norwegian Society for Development (Selskabet for Norges Vel) in 1811, coming up with the best writing arguing for a separate Norwegian university in Christiania, with Mnemosyne (published in Historisk-philosophiske Samlinger in 1811).

In Kristiansand he was an active participant at Det Dramatiske Selskab, which had been founded by his father-in-law.

He was elected delegate to the Eidsvoll Assembly in 1814, where he was a member of the constitution committee. He participated actively also in the plenary sessions, with long and well-prepared speeches. His unionist and anti-Danish point of view made him less popular among delegates with a different opininon. During the drafting of the Norwegian constitution, Wergeland was one of the principle authors of the Jew clause, which prohibited Jews from entering Norway.

Throughout his life Wergeland participated actively in political and cultural debates, published several works, experimented with drawing and painting, and composed music.

Wergeland died in Eidsvoll on 25 March 1848.

== Selected bibliography ==
- Haldor Smeks smaae Tildragelser i Livet, Eventyr, Bemærkninger og Meninger: et humoristisk Skrift i den yorickske Smag
- Hendricopoedie: kortfattede Love for Opdragelsen fra den spædeste Alder: en Lommebog for Forældre (1808)
- Haldor Smeks Tildragelser efter hans Hjemkomst: en Fortsættelse, der indeholder en Deel af hans Ungdoms Amouretter (1809)
- Mnemosyne : et Forsøg paa at besvare den af Det kongl. Selskab for Norges Vel fremsatte Opgave om et Universitet i Norge: et Priisskrift Wergeland (1811)
- Cantate til Universitets-Festen den 11. Decb. 1811 (1811)
- Slaget ved Lyngøer den 6 Juli 1812: et Digt (1812)
- Sang i Anledning af Hans Høyhed Prinds Christian Frederiks Nærværelse i Christiansand den 14. August 1813 (1813)
- En politisk Tale til det norske Folk (1814)
- Udkast til Grundlov for Kongeriget Norge paa Rigsforsamlingen paa Eidsvold 1814 (1814)
- Kong Christian Frederik mishandlet: Beviser derfor i aftvungne Ord om Capellanen Hr. Nicolaj Wergeland og hans Flyveblad "Et Ord til Publikum" mod W. Sebbelow Sebbelow, Wincents Lassen (1815)
- En sandfærdig Beretning om Danmarks politiske Forbrydelser imod Kongeriget Norge fra Aar 955 indtil 1814, eller fra Hakon Adelsteens Krig med Harald Blaatand, indtil Fredsslutningen i Kiel (1816)
- Tilintetgjørelse af alle fiendtlige Anfald paa det af Sandheden selv befæstede Skrift: "Beretning om Danmarks politiske Forhold imod Kongeriget Norge" o.s.v. (1817)
- Afskeds-Tale holden for Christiansands Menighed 11te Mai 1817 og efter Ønske udgivet i Trykken (1817)
- Bemærkninger over skriftet: "En sandfærdig beretning om Danmarks politiske forbrydelser imod kongeriget Norge fra 995 til 1814. En historisk skisse Falsen, Christian Magnus (1817)
- Fortrolige Breve til en Ven, skrevne fra Eidsvold i Aaret 1814 (1830)
- Smaae Poesier (1830)
- Fjorten Paragrapher Kirke- og Underviisnings-Væsenet vedkommende (1832)
- Retfærdig Bedømmelse af Henrik Wergelands Poesi og Karakteer: en æsthetisk-polemisk Afhandling foranlediget ved J.S. Welhavens uefterrettelige Kritik i Skriftet "H. Wergelands Digtekunst og Polemik" (1833)
- Psalmer om Jesu Christi Lidelse, Død og Begravelse: fra den svenske Psalmebog uddragne, oversatte, omarbejdede og bekjendte Melodier tillempede; med Tillæg (1833)
- Forsvar for det norske Folk og udførlig Kritik over det berygtede Skrift Norges Dæmring (1835)
- Lærebog i den Evangelisk-Luthersk Christelige Religion: efter Luthers Katechismus og Pontoppidans Forklaring (1836)
- Den franske Stilist, eller Lexikalsk og grammatikalsk Underviisning i det franske Sprog : med Hensyn til nyeste Brug: en Haandbog for Norske og Danske Wergeland (1841)
- Sørgetale over Hans Majestæt høisalig Kong Carl Johan, holden i Eidsvold kirke den 28 April 1844 (1844)
- Rejse fra Havre de Grace til Christiania: indeholdende flere forskjellige tildeels kyniske Eventyr, stærkt spækket med Anekdoter og Riim, Charader og Gaader (1848)
- Tanker og Bekjendelser (1848)
