= Henrik Dedichen =

Norwegian psychiatrist

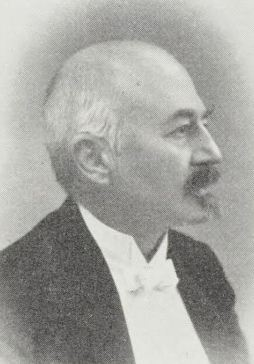
- Born: 23 March 1863; Modum, Norway
- Died: 3 March 1935 (aged 71); Aker, Norway
- Occupation: Psychiatrist
- Children: Aimée Sommerfelt
- Relatives: Heinrich Arnold Thaulow (grandfather); Nicoline Thaulow (grandmother); Niels Andreas Vibe (great-grandfather); Carl Looft (cousin); Hans Heiberg (nephew)

Henrik Arnold Thaulow Dedichen (23 March 1863 – 3 March 1935) was a Norwegian psychiatrist. He was born in Modum. He was a great-grandson of Niels Andreas Vibe and grandson of Heinrich Arnold Thaulow and Nicoline Vibe. He was the father of children's writer Aimée Sommerfelt, and an uncle of Hans Heiberg.

He established a private psychiatric hospital at Trosterud in Østre Aker in 1911, which he managed until 1933. He started and edited the journal Tidsskrift for nordisk retsmedicin og psykiatri from 1901 to 1911, and wrote several books on psychiatric subjects. He was a member of the Royal Norwegian Society of Sciences and Letters from 1895, and was awarded the King's Medal of Merit in gold in 1926.
