= Else Høst =

Norwegian literary historian and author (1908–1996)

Else Marie Høst, née Røysland (11 March 1908–August 1, 1996) was a Norwegian literary historian and author.

Else Marie Røysland was born in Stavanger, Norway to Iver Johan Røysland (1870) and Gustava Aldén (1875-1932). In 1931 she married philologist Gunnar Høst (1900–1983), and became a daughter-in-law of Sigurd Høst.

After a period of study in Sweden in 1930 and at the Swedish Institute in Rome during 1931, she attended the University of Oslo. She took her mag.art. degree in 1941 and dr.philos. degree in 1959 on the basis of her thesis Hedda Gabler. En monografi about Ibsen's Hedda Gabler. She later wrote Vildanden av Henrik Ibsen (1967), a book about Ibsen's The Wild Duck. She also published several textbooks. In 1970 and 1971 she co-released Fransk lesning I and Fransk lesning II together with her husband.
