= Carl Looft =

Norwegian physician

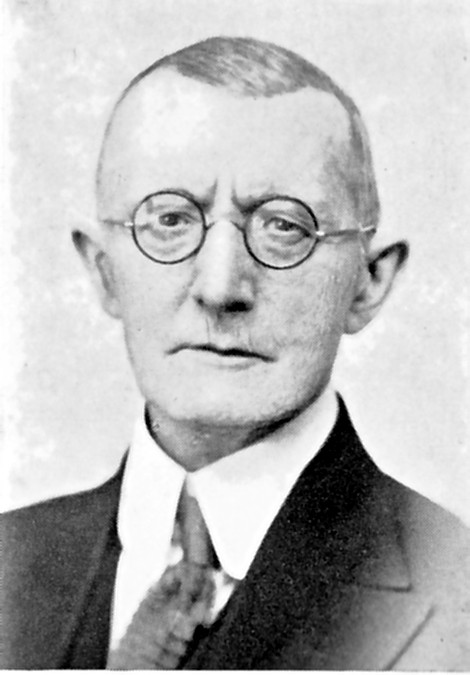
- Born: Carl Knutsen; 9 February 1863; Bærum Municipality, Norway
- Died: 10 April 1943 (aged 80); Bergen Municipality, Norway
- Occupation: Physician (pediatrician)
- Spouse: Sofie Bolette Gran
- Parent(s): Carl August Knutsen; Margery Henriette Caroline Louise Thaulow
- Relatives: Heinrich Arnold Thaulow (grandfather); Henrik Dedichen (cousin)

Carl Looft (né Knutsen; 9 February 1863 – 10 April 1943) was a Norwegian physician, and among the first pediatricians in Norway. While his early work research focused on leprosy, he later became interested in children's health and development. He worked in private practice and throughout schools in Bergen, and he wrote a textbook on infant care.

== Biography ==
Looft was born in Bærum Municipality to physician Carl August Knutsen and Margery Henriette Caroline Louise Thaulow, and was a grandson of Heinrich Arnold Thaulow. In 1892 he married Sofie Bolette Gran.

Looft graduated as cand.med. in 1889 and thereafter worked at the Rikshospitalet in Oslo and the Lungegaardshospitalet in Bergen. At the latter, he worked within the hospital laboratory and was involved in research on leprosy with Daniel Cornelius Danielssen and Gerhard Armauer Hansen. He went on to publish with Hansen on the microbiology of leprosy. While his early career and research was focused on leprosy, he had a special interest in children's diseases, although pediatrics was not yet a distinct medical specialty. His doctoral thesis from 1897 was a treatment of mental disability among children. From 1890 to 1940 he practiced as pediatrician in private practice in Bergen. Alongside Axel Johannessen, he is regarded as one of Norway's first pediatricians.

In addition to his work as physician, he was responsible for a series of epidemiological investigations among children. Among his conclusions was that appropriate nutrition during pregnancy and infancy was an important factor for the mental development of the children. He authored a textbook on infant care which was first published in 1912 and was published in several editions until 1938. He also established a mental health school in Fana Municipality and worked as a school doctor throughout Bergen's schools.

Looft died in 1943 in Bergen.
