= Alf Sommerfelt =

Norwegian linguist and professor

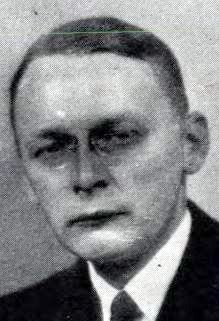
Alf Sommerfelt

Alf Sommerfelt (November 23, 1892 – October 12, 1965) was a Norwegian linguist and the first professor of linguistics in Norway, working at the University of Oslo from 1931 to 1962.

== Personal life ==
Sommerfelt was born in Trondheim, Norway. He married the young adult literature writer Aimée Sommerfelt. He died in Nes, Norway, aged 72.

== Linguistics work ==
Sommerfelt was a central figure in the introduction of structuralism in Norway. He had studied in Paris, and held lectures on Saussure, glossematics, the Prague school and American structuralism. People at the Nordic institutes, on the other hand, didn't subscribe to Sommerfelt's methods, and there was little contact between them and the structuralists until the 1960s.

Together with the Slavicist Olaf Broch, Sommerfelt founded the Norwegian association for linguistics in 1924, an association that would play an important part in the introduction of new linguistic theories to Norway.

Sommerfelt wrote several popular introductions to linguistics. He also wrote an introductory book on general linguistics (1947), a book read by all the linguistics students at the university of Oslo, and reprinted ten years later. Sommerfelt was also one of the editors of Norsk riksmålsordbog (the Norwegian Riksmål dictionary).

== Selected bibliography ==
- Sommerfelt, Alf 1921: Le Breton parlé a Saint-Pol-de-Leon : Phonétique et morphologie
- Sommerfelt, Alf 1922: The dialect of Torr Co. Donegal. Videnskapsselskapets skrifter II. Hist.-filos. kl. 1-2
- Sommerfelt, Alf 1934:Hvordan sproget blir til : en oversikt over sprogets rolle i samfundene Oslo : Cappelens forlag.
- Sommerfelt, Alf 1947: Almen språkvitenskap : (det propedeutiske kursus).
