= Jacob Munch =

Norwegian painter and officer (1776–1839)

Jacob Edvardsson Munch
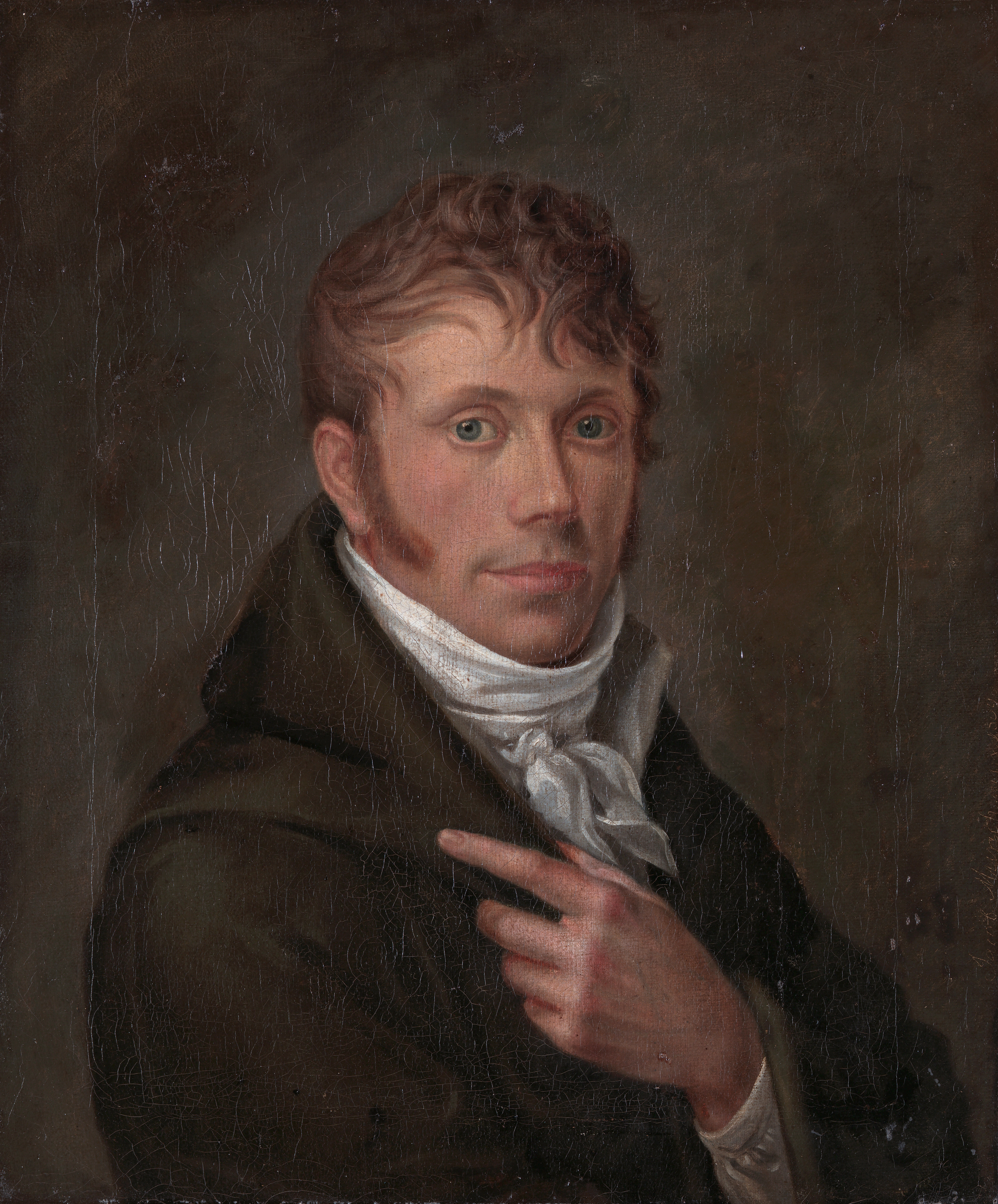
- Self-portrait of Munch
- Born: August 9, 1776; Kristiania, Norway
- Died: June 10, 1839 (aged 62); Kristiania, Norway
- Education: Royal Danish Academy of Fine Arts
- Spouse: Emerentze Carlsen Barclay
- Parent(s): Edvard Munch (1738-1793); Petronelle Helene Krefting (1746-1810)

Jacob Edvardsson Munch ( 9 August 1776 – 10 June 1839) was a Norwegian military officer and painter.

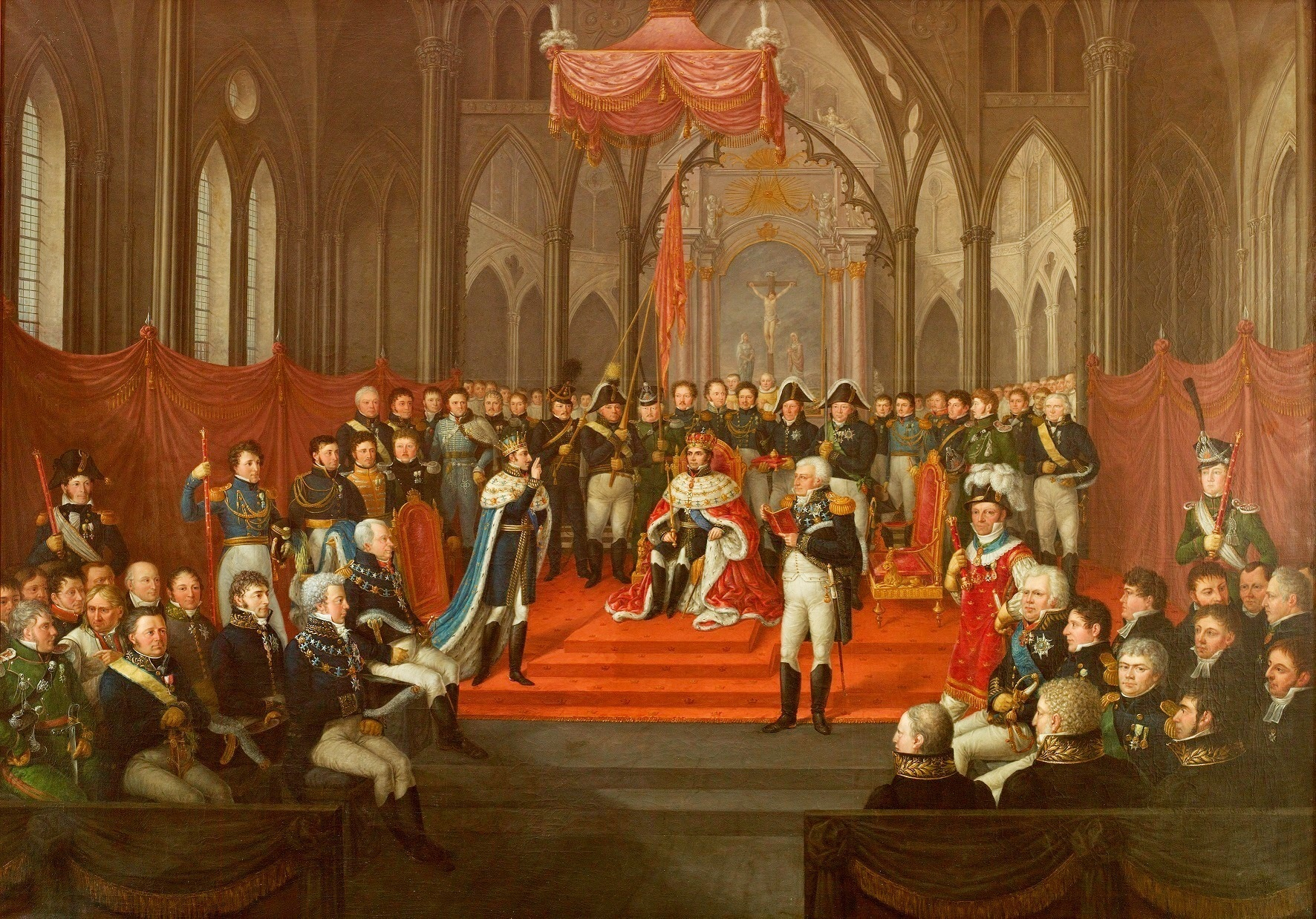
Coronation of Charles XIV John as king of Norway at Nidaros Cathedral

== Biography ==
Munch was born in Christiania, Norway. He was educated at the Academy of Fine Arts in Copenhagen (1804–1806) and later Paris. His teacher was French Neoclassical painter Jacques-Louis David. After his studies, he worked in Italy and Germany.

He painted a series of portraits of the famous people of the time. Munch was invited to Norway in 1813 by future Danish king Christian Frederik. His most notable assignment was the coronation picture of Charles XIV John as king of Norway from 1818. The coronation of Charles XIV John at Nidaros Cathedral was made on royal order.

Jacob Munch co-founded the Norwegian National Academy of Craft and Art Industry in Christiania in 1818 and also worked as a teacher there.

== Family ==
Jacob was a son of inspector Edvard Munch (1738–1793) and Petronelle Helene Krefting (1746 – 1810). He married Emerentze Carlsen Barclay (1786–1869), whose parents were Christen Carlsen Barclay and Severine Bøhme. They were the parents of Sophie Edvarda Munch, Emma Wilhelmine Munch, Nicoline Munch and Marie Fredrikke Munch.

His relatives included medical officer Christian Munch (1817–89) and historian Peter Andreas Munch (1810-1863) as well as the famous painter Edvard Munch (1863–1944).
