= Johan Fredrik Thaulow =

Norwegian physician and Army officer

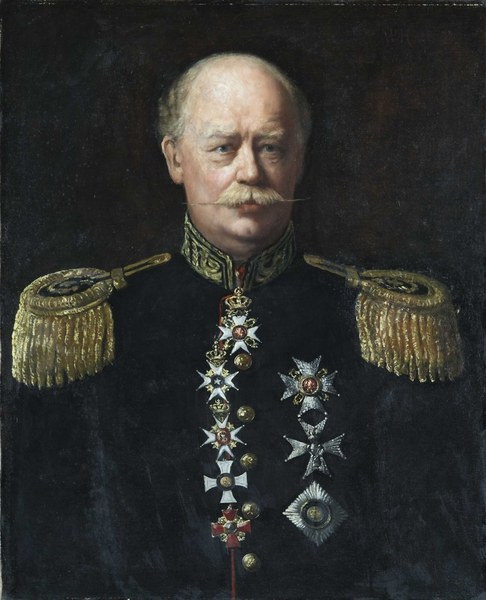
- A portrait of Wilhelm Holter - Johan
- Born: 22 May 1840; Christiania
- Died: 24 April 1912 (aged 71); Kristiania
- Occupations: Physician; Military officer
- Known for: Chairman of the Norwegian Red Cross
- Children: Carl Thaulow
- Father: Moritz Christian Julius Thaulow
- Relatives: Frits Thaulow (cousin)

Johan Fredrik Thaulow (22 May 1840 – 24 April 1912) was a Norwegian physician and Army officer.

He was born in Christiania to chemistry professor Moritz Christian Julius Thaulow. He was a nephew of chemist Harald Thaulow, and a cousin of painter Frits Thaulow. From 1889 to 1909 he headed the medical service of the Norwegian Army, eventually with the title of lieutenant general. He chaired the Norwegian Red Cross from 1889 to 1905.
