= General War Commissioner =

General War Commissioner (from German: Generalkriegskommissarius) was a military office in various German states as well as in Denmark–Norway. It was the military officer in charge of national conscription, collection of war contributions, equipment, provisioning, payroll, and military discipline. Their subordinates, with responsibility for specific regions, were called War Commissioners. The position of General War Commissioner was usually of equal rank to that of a General.

== Denmark–Norway ==
The position was created in Denmark–Norway in the 17th century. Related offices included the local land-krigskommissær and sø-krigskommissær office-holder, as of 1802 merged into one office as land- og søkrigskommissær. Krigskommissær (Overkrigskommissær) was also used as a purely honorary title, often acquired by wealthy citizens on the payment of a sum of money.

In Norway it existed from 1640 to 1990.
