= Camilla Collett =

Norwegian writer (1813–1895)

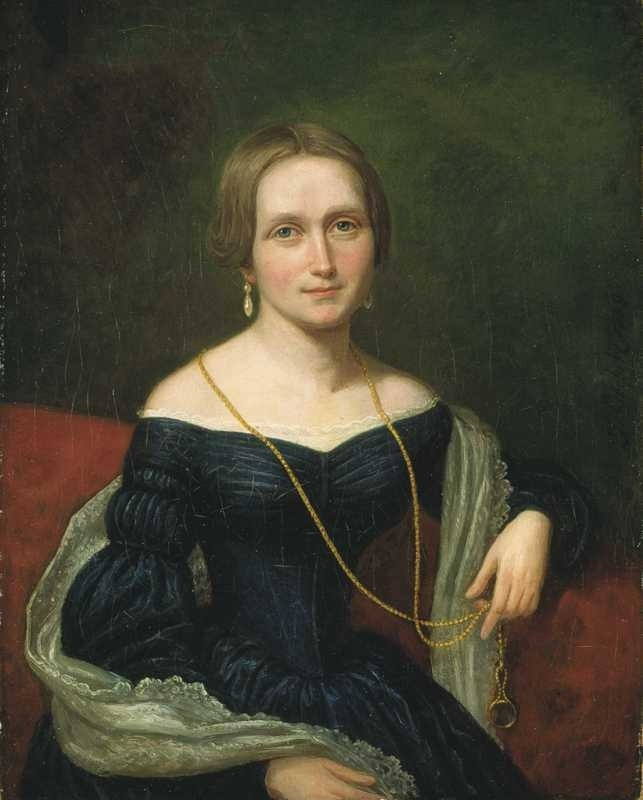
Camilla Collett (1839)

Jacobine Camilla Collett (née Wergeland; 23 January 1813 – 6 March 1895) was a Norwegian writer, often referred to as the first Norwegian feminist. She was also the younger sister of Norwegian poet Henrik Wergeland, and is recognized as being one of the first contributors to realism in Norwegian literature. Her younger brother was Major General Joseph Frantz Oscar Wergeland. She became an honorary member of the Norwegian Association for Women's Rights when the association was founded in 1884.

== Life ==
Camilla was born in Kristiansand, Norway, the daughter of Nicolai Wergeland, a noted theologian, politician, and composer in his time, and Alette née Thaulow. Her brother, was the writer Henrik Wergeland. When Camilla was four, her family moved to Eidsvoll, where her father was made parish priest. Camilla grew up in a literary family, and she became a young diarist, in part because she found life in Eidsvoll dull. She spent most of her teenage years at a finishing school in Christiansfeld in Denmark.

During a visit to Kristiania she met and fell in love with the poet Johan Sebastian Welhaven, who was also her brother Henrik's literary nemesis. Relations between the three were complicated and in time became legendary in Norwegian Romanticism. Collett was philosophically aligned with the Welhaven side of the debate, and her relationship with her brother may have been uneasy for some time. But there are indications that Camilla carried some resentment toward her father and brother over their opposition to her relationship with Welhaven. She also suffered from health problems during, and in the summer of 1834 her father took her to Paris to regain strength and recover her health.

In any event, her relationship with Welhaven eventually ended, and in 1841 she married Peter Jonas Collett, a prominent politician, literary critic, and member of the Intelligenspartiet (the Intelligence party). It was by all accounts a marriage born out of love and he was a supportive and understanding husband with whom Camilla could discuss any topic. She started writing for publication after she married Collett.

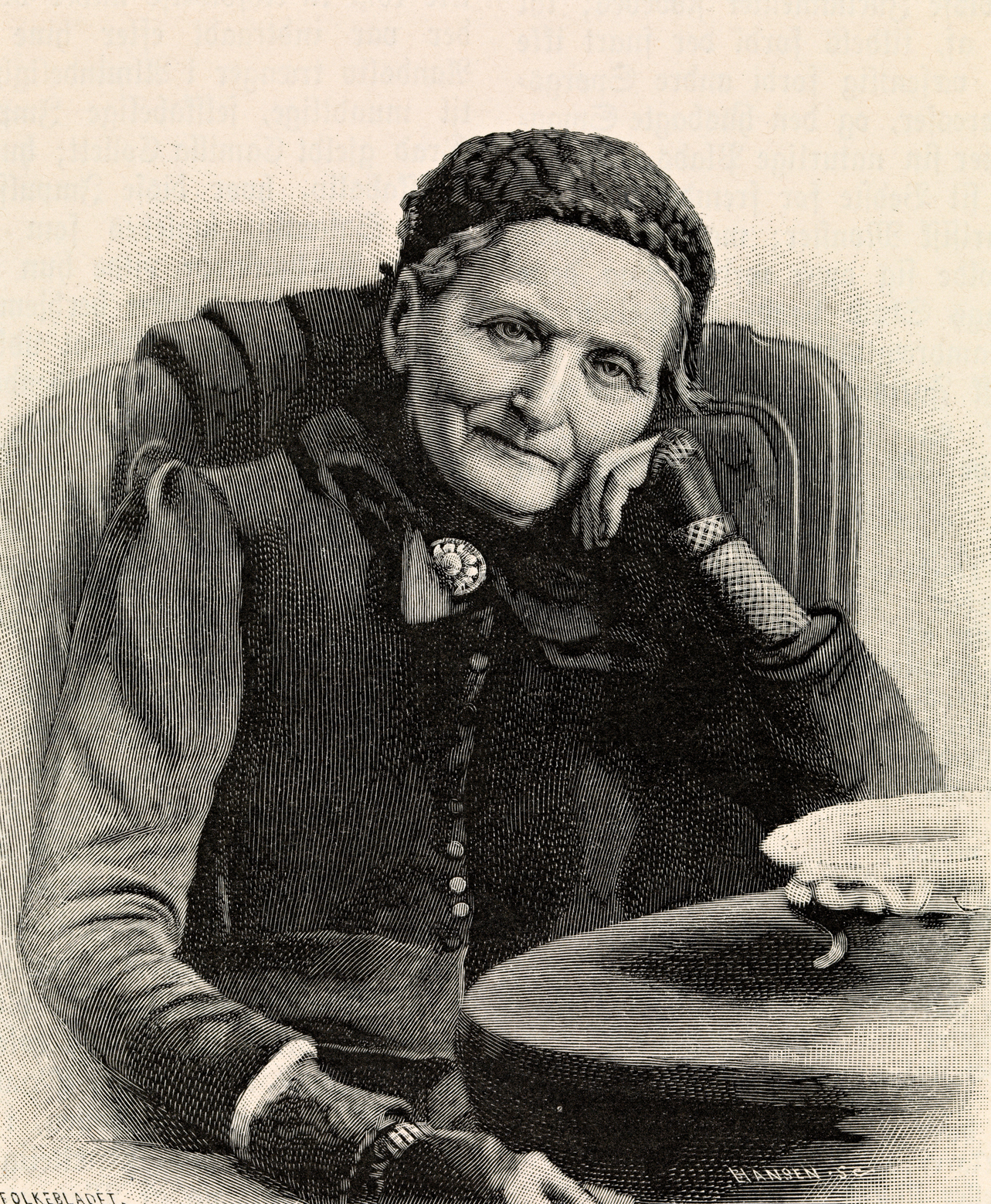
Photograph of Camilla Collett (1893)

Her most famous work is her only novel, Amtmandens Døtre (The District Governor's Daughters) which was published anonymously in two separate parts in 1854 and 1855. The book is considered one of the first political and social realism novels in Norway and deals with the difficulties of being a woman in a patriarchical society in general and forced marriages specifically. It is believed that her personal experiences in life, specifically her relationship with Welhaven, influenced the book. After this book, she wrote very little fiction, but did continue to write essays, polemics, and her memoirs.

Her literary models included female writers such as Rahel Varnhagen and George Sand, as well as Edward Bulwer-Lytton and Theodor Mundt. Her style represented a departure from her contemporaries, in that she preferred a more casual, natural tone.

In 1851, after ten years of marriage, her husband died suddenly. This left Camilla to raise four young sons. She was forced to sell her house and never managed to buy a new one again. Her three eldest sons were sent to be raised by relatives. She struggled with personal financial problems for the rest of her life. She died in Kristiania (Oslo) on 6 March 1895.

== Writing style and influences ==
Collett was raised in a house that admired the works of Jean-Jacques Rousseau, which would be a major influence on both Collett and her brother, Nicolai. At the beginning of writing Amtmandens Døtre, she found inspiration from George Sand, though she felt Sand's ideas were too radical. In the novel, she discusses how young women and girls are deprived of training and education that will encourage them better life success, but she does not argue that women should pursue life and success independent of being married. Collett suggests that for the four daughters, marriage based on love and respect is the ultimate opportunity for a successful life. The book is considered to be "sharply critical" of the concepts of forced marriage and marriage that takes place for the sake of social conventions and popularity. She supports the idea of romantic love, and the freedom of women to make their own relationship choice(s), through personal emancipation.

The older Collett got, the more radical her own views became, becoming increasingly polemic. She supported social and political change to further women's roles in society, and the articles that she published were published anonymously, but eventually published in a book of collected works. A stigma was attached to the idea of a woman writing the content and sharing the ideas she shared publicly, and this affected her career and her emotional state. Collett channeled this frustration into her writing, where she often examined that stigma. After the writing of Amtmandens Døtre, she focused largely on reviews and essays about literature, many of which solidified Collett as the first feminist literary critic in Norway. In these essays and opinion pieces, she declared the need for a new image for women and discarded the idea of women being reticent, and self-sacrificing in their lives.

Her work was cited by her contemporaries such as Henrik Ibsen.

== Bibliography ==
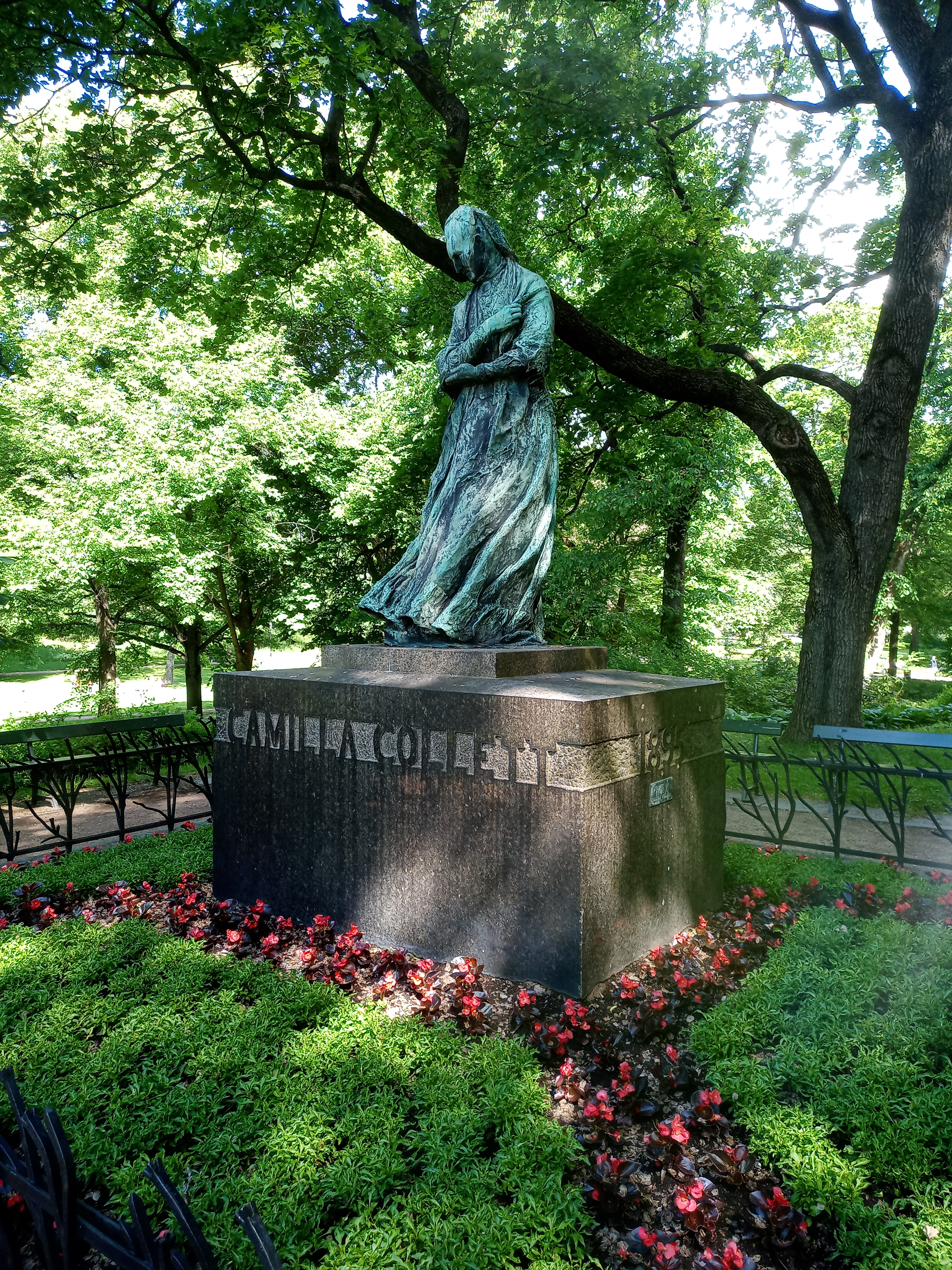
A statue of Camilla Collett by Gustav Vigeland in Oslo

- Amtmandens Døtre (novel) 1854–55 (reviewed editions: 1860, 1879)
- Fortællinger (short prose) 1860
- I de lange Nætter (diary) 1862
- Sidste Blade I–III (articles) 1868–73
- Fra de Stummes Leir (articles) 1877
- Mod Strømmen I–II (articles) 1879–85
- Skrifter I–X (collection of works) 1892–93
- Dagbøker og breve (with Peter Jonas Collett) 1926–34
