= Psychological fiction =

Literary genre

Psychological Fiction

Subgenres
- Psychological thriller, psychological horror, psychological drama, psychological science fiction

In literature, psychological fiction (also psychological realism) is a narrative genre that emphasizes interior characterization and motivation to explore the spiritual, emotional, and mental lives of its characters. The mode of narration examines the reasons for the behaviours of the character, which propel the plot and explain the story. Psychological realism is achieved with deep explorations and explanations of the mental states of the character's inner person, usually through narrative modes such as stream of consciousness and flashbacks.

== Early examples ==
The psychological novel has a rich past in the seventeenth- and eighteenth-century works of Mme de Lafayette, the Abbé Prévost, Samuel Richardson, Jean-Jacques Rousseau and many others, but it goes on being disinvented by ideologues and reinvented by their opponents because the subtleties of psychology defy most ideologies.

Yingying's Biography by Yuan Zhen, written in 9th-century Tang China, is a pioneering work of psychological fiction in the form of a short story (chuanqi). The Tale of Genji by Lady Murasaki, written in 11th-century Japan, was and is considered by many, including Jorge Luis Borges, as the first full-length psychological novel. French theorists Gilles Deleuze and Félix Guattari, in A Thousand Plateaus, evaluated the 12th-century Arthurian author Chrétien de Troyes' Lancelot, the Knight of the Cart and Perceval, the Story of the Grail as early examples of the style of the psychological novel. Another early example is the Portuguese pastoral romance Menina e Moça (1554) by Bernardim Ribeiro.

Stendhal's The Red and the Black and Madame de La Fayette's The Princess of Cleves are considered the first precursors of the psychological novel. The modern psychological novel originated, according to The Encyclopedia of the Novel, primarily in the works of Nobel laureate Knut Hamsun – in particular, Hunger (1890), Mysteries (1892), Pan (1894) and Victoria (1898).

== Notable examples ==
One of the greatest writers of the genre was Fyodor Dostoyevsky. His novels deal strongly with ideas, and characters who embody these ideas, how they play out in real world circumstances, and the value of them, most notably The Brothers Karamazov and Crime and Punishment.

In the literature of the United States, Henry James, Patrick McGrath, Arthur Miller, and Edith Wharton are considered "major contributor[s] to the practice of psychological realism."

== Subgenres ==
=== Psychological thriller ===
A subgenre of the thriller and psychological novel genres, emphasizing the inner mind and mentality of characters in a creative work. Because of its complexity, the genre often overlaps and/or incorporates elements of mystery, drama, action, slasher, and horror — often psychological horror. It bears similarities to the Gothic and detective fiction genres.

=== Psychological horror ===
A subgenre of the horror and psychological novel genres that relies on the psychological, emotional and mental states of characters to generate horror. On occasions, it overlaps with the psychological thriller subgenre to enhance the story suspensefully.

=== Psychological drama ===
A subgenre of the drama and psychological novel genres, focuses upon the emotional, mental, and psychological development of characters in a dramatic work. One Flew Over the Cuckoo's Nest (1975) and Requiem for a Dream (2000), both based on novels, are notable examples of this subgenre.

=== Psychological science fiction ===
Psychological science fiction refers to works that focus is on the character's inner struggle dealing with political or technological forces. A Clockwork Orange (1971) is a notable example of this genre.

== See also ==
- Existentialist fiction
- Literary realism
- Paranoid fiction
