= Knut Hamsun's obituary of Adolf Hitler =

1945 obituary in Aftenposten

In 1945 at the age of 86, the Nobel laureate novelist Knut Hamsun wrote an obituary of Adolf Hitler in the newspaper Aftenposten. Hamsun's eulogy to Hitler served as the collaborationist newspaper's feature article on Hitler's death. The obituary came to be his most infamous written piece.

== The obituary ==
The short obituary reads in its entirety:

I'm not worthy to speak up for Adolf Hitler, and to any sentimental rousing his life and deeds do not invite.

Hitler was a warrior, a warrior for humankind and a preacher of the gospel of justice for all nations. He was a reforming character of the highest order, and his historical fate was that he functioned in a time of unequaled brutality, which in the end failed him.

Thus may the ordinary Western European look at Adolf Hitler. And we, his close followers, bow our heads at his death.

== Background ==
Knut Hamsun has been described as anti-British and pro-German, and as sympathizing with the Nazi cause. He openly supported Hitler, but even though Nasjonal Samling eventually formed a government controlled by the German Reichskommissar after the war broke out, it is clear to historians he was never actually a self-enrolled party member (in a civil lawsuit, he was found to have been a member under dissent from the professional judge, during the legal purge in Norway after World War II). Hamsun never signed up for any membership in the NS, although NS included him. Nonetheless, Hamsun was an opponent of the Reichskommissar Josef Terboven, and in 1943 he unsuccessfully appealed to Adolf Hitler in person to remove Terboven from office.

== Publication and reception ==
The obituary was published on the evening of 7 May 1945, one week after Hitler's death. Parts of the rather short obituary soon became infamous: Hamsun referred to Hitler as "a warrior for humankind and a preacher of the gospel of justice for all nations" and "a reformer of the highest order".

The obituary is often cited as a pivotal point in Hamsun's expression of his own political views, severely affecting the reception of his complete body of works. Writings such as these rose somewhat in importance due to the fact that the praised novelist Hamsun had not released a work of fiction since 1936's The Ring is Closed. Biographer Ingar Sletten Kolloen has referred to the obituary as one of "four mortal sins" committed by Hamsun which came to erode his position in Norwegian post-war society. On the other hand, Jørgen Haugan at the University of Copenhagen has stated regret that Hamsun's wrongdoings, among others the obituary of Hitler, had not overshadowed his literary qualities to what Haugan deems to be a sufficient degree.

For Hamsun himself, the obituary and other statements and writings led to his arrest soon after the war's end. However, the charges against him were softened as professor Gabriel Langfeldt and chief physician Ørnulv Ødegård found him to have "permanently impaired mental abilities". In 1949, in his 90th year, Hamsun issued a biographical account of his life, including a discussion of the occupation in Norway, in the book On Overgrown Paths. He died in 1952.

Professor Atle Kittang at the University of Bergen wrote on "Hamsun's legacy" at the website of the Knut Hamsun Centre. He stated there was a "complex set of reasons" behind Hamsun's "act" of publishing the obituary. He notes that, after their single meeting in 1943, Hitler did not "rank very high in [Hamsun's] evalutation". Accordingly, Kittang believes one should consider the obituary as part of Hamsun's "need to provoke", which is demonstrated by his life and work.
