= Dreamers (novel) =

1904 novel by Knut Hamsun

Dreamers (Norwegian: Sværmere, also published in English as Mothwise) is a novel by Knut Hamsun from 1904. The novel is among Hamsun's last set in Nordland and it contains many comical and caricatured people and events.

The main characters are the telegraph operator Ove Rolandsen and Elise Mack, the daughter of the "privileged trader" Mack of Rosengaard. This Mack is referred to as a brother of the privileged trader at Sirilund in Hamsun's novel Pan.

The novel was written while Hamsun was living at the Reenskaug Hotel in Drøbak.

In the copy that Hamsun sent to his friend in Bergen, Køhler Olsen, he wrote the following dedication: "This is a book with a priest's wife that misses – me." When he later published the novel Under the Autumn Star (Under Høststjernen), his dedication to Køhler Olsen read "And, dear Køhler, this is a book about a priest's wife that has NOT missed me. Are you so happy?" The copies are held by the university library in Bergen.

== Film adaptation ==
The 1993 film The Telegraphist was based on the novel.
