= Pan (1995 film) =

- Directed by: Henning Carlsen
- Written by: Knut Hamsun (novel); Henning Carlsen (script)
- Produced by: Axel Helgeland
- Starring: Sofie Gråbøl, Lasse Kolsrud, Bjørn Sundquist, Anneke von der Lippe, Per Schaanning
- Cinematography: Henning Kristiansen
- Edited by: Anders Refn
- Music by: Hilmar Örn Hilmarsson
- Release date: 22 September 1995
- Running time: 115 minutes
- Countries: Denmark, Norway, Germany
- Languages: Danish and Norwegian

Pan (also released under the title Two Green Feathers) is a 1995 Danish/Norwegian/German film directed by the Danish director Henning Carlsen. It is based on Knut Hamsun's 1894 novel of the same name, and also incorporates the short story "Paper on Glahn's Death", which Hamsun had written and published earlier, but which was later appended to editions of the novel. It is the fourth and most recent film adaptation of the novel—the novel was previously adapted into motion pictures in 1922, 1937, and 1962.

== Production ==
In 1966 Carlsen had directed an acclaimed version of Hamsun's Hunger. Thirty years later he returned to Hamsun to make Pan, a book he called "one big poem". The film was produced primarily with Norwegian resources, and classified as a Norwegian film; Carlsen later expressed his dissatisfaction with the film's promotion by the Norwegian Film Institute, saying that the Institute had preferred to promote films with Norwegian directors. Carlsen said that he had decided to incorporate the "forgotten" material from "Glahn's Death" in order to find a "new angle" for filming the book. The Glahn's Death portion was filmed in Thailand, standing in for the India location in the novel (the 1922 film version had placed this material in Algeria).

The film had its American premiere at the Museum of Modern Art in New York City as part of MOMA's 1995 retrospective of films based on Hamsun's work.

== Awards ==
Anneke von der Lippe won the 1995 Norwegian International Film Festival's Amanda Award for Best Actress for her work in Pan and another film, Over stork og stein. She also won the 1996 Danish Bodil Award for Best Supporting Actress for Pan.

== Cast ==
- Sofie Gråbøl as Edvarda Mack
- Lasse Kolsrud as Lieutenant Thomas Glahn
- Bjørn Sundquist as Ferdinand Mack
- Anneke von der Lippe as Eva
- Per Schaanning as the Doctor
- Peter Striebeck as the Baron
- Shaun Lawton as the Hunter
