= A Wanderer Plays on Muted Strings =

1909 book by Knut Hamsun

- Author: Knut Hamson
- Publication date: 1909

A Wanderer Plays on Muted Strings (Norwegian: En Vandrer spiller med Sordin) is the second book in Knut Hamsun's "wanderer trilogy." The work was published by Gyldendal in 1909 in Kristiania (now Oslo). The other books in the trilogy are Under the Autumn Star (1906) and The Last Joy (1912).

The story's protagonist takes his name, Knut Pedersen, from the author. Pedersen flees from the city's bustle and returns to the countryside. He lives a roving life, where, along with random acquaintances, he seeks all kinds of work on various farms. The protagonist is constantly in love and, as so often in Hamsun's books, these infatuations are quite unsuccessful. In addition, the story is characterized by Hamsun's criticism of progress and love for his homeland.
