= Hamsun (film) =

- Film poster
- Directed by: Jan Troell
- Written by: Screenplay: Per Olov Enquist; Book: Thorkild Hansen; Marie Hamsun (autobiography)
- Produced by: Erik Crone
- Starring: Max von Sydow; Ghita Nørby; Anette Hoff; Eindride Eidsvold; Gard Eidsvold; Åsa Söderling; Sverre Anker Ousdal
- Cinematography: Jan Troell; Mischa Gavrjusjov
- Release dates: 19 April 1996 (Norway); 26 April 1996 (Denmark); 26 April 1996 (Sweden)
- Running time: 159 minutes
- Countries: Denmark; Sweden; Norway; Germany
- Languages: Swedish; Danish; Norwegian; German

Hamsun is a 1996 internationally co-produced drama film directed by Jan Troell and written by Per Olov Enquist, about the later life of the Norwegian author Knut Hamsun (Max von Sydow), who, together with his wife Marie Hamsun (Ghita Nørby), went from being a national hero to a traitor after supporting Nazi Germany during their occupation of Norway during World War II.

Sydow and Nørby speak in their native Swedish and Danish languages respectively, though there is a scene where he speaks English and several where she speaks German; the rest of the cast speak Norwegian or German.

The film won the Guldbagge Awards for Best Film, Best Actor (Sydow), Best Actress (Nørby) and Best Screenplay (Enquist). The film was selected as the Danish entry for the Best Foreign Language Film at the 69th Academy Awards, but was not shortlisted as a nominee.

== Cast ==
- Max von Sydow as Knut Hamsun
- Ghita Nørby as Marie Hamsun
- Anette Hoff as Ellinor Hamsun
- Gard B. Eidsvold as Arild Hamsun
- Eindride Eidsvold as Tore Hamsun
- Åsa Söderling as Cecilia Hamsun
- Sverre Anker Ousdal as Vidkun Quisling
- Liv Steen as Maria Quisling
- Erik Hivju as Dr. Gabriel Langfeldt
- Edgar Selge as Josef Terboven
- Ernst Jacobi as Adolf Hitler
- Svein Erik Brodal as Egil Holmboe
- Per Jansen as Harald Grieg
- Jesper Christensen as Otto Dietrich
- Johannes Joner as Finn Christensen
- Finn Schau - Ørnulv Ødegård

== Production ==
The plans for the film have a history from 1979, when Thorkild Hansen, the author of the book Processen mod Hamsun contacted Troell since he wanted him to direct a Norwegian television series based on the book. Max von Sydow was meant to do the part as Hamsun already then, but NRK dropped out on the project in the belief that it would be too controversial.

Fourteen years later, in 1993, von Sydow brought the project back to life when he got the Danish production company Nordisk Film interested in adapting the book, this time with Per Olov Enquist, who had written Troell's previous film Il Capitano, providing the screenplay.

The shooting took place during the spring and the summer of 1995, with a budget of around 40 million SEK. The most expensive scene filmed, in which Marie Hamsun witnesses the attack and the sinking of the German cruiser Blücher in the Oslofjord at the Battle of Drøbak Sound on 9 April 1940, was cut from the finished product.

== Release ==
The film was initially meant to be released in the autumn 1996 at the Venice Film Festival, but was brought forward to the spring as Norwegian television would release another film about Hamsun the same year. It also saved the film from having to compete against Bille August's historical epic Jerusalem.

During the Swedish release Troell and the producer heavily criticized the distributor, Svensk Filmindustri, for the sloppy handling of the film, something he had also experienced with his previous film Il Capitano.

== See also ==
- Notable film portrayals of Nobel laureates
- List of submissions to the 69th Academy Awards for Best Foreign Language Film
- List of Danish submissions for the Academy Award for Best Foreign Language Film
