= Sverre Lyngstad =

Scholar and translator of Norwegian literature (1922–2011)

Sverre Lyngstad (April 30, 1922 – May 2, 2011) was a scholar and translator of Norwegian literature. He is renowned for his significant contribution to making Norwegian literature accessible to an English-speaking audience, for which he was awarded the St. Olav's Medal in 1987 and the Royal Norwegian Order of Merit, Knight's Cross, First Class in 2004. He is best known for his translations of and commentaries on the works of Knut Hamsun, which are widely credited for helping to popularise Hamsun's work in the US and UK.

== Biography ==
Born on 30 April 1922 in Lyngstad, Norway, Sverre Lyngstad obtained degrees in English and history from the University of Oslo in 1943 and 1946 respectively. He earned his M.A. in English at the University of Washington and his PhD from New York University in 1960 under the supervision of David H. Greene, before becoming assistant professor in English at Newark College of Engineering.

He became particularly well known in 1996 for his translation of Knut Hamsun's Hunger, which corrected what he described as the unfaithfulness of a previous translation by Robert Bly (1967), quipping that "If the narrator of Knut Hamsun's Hunger could have foreseen the abuse his story would suffer at the hands of translators and/or publishers, his demonic rebellion would surely have been considerably heightened". James Wood praised the new translation as "superbly fresh", noting that ""If [Hamsun's] novels are not much read in English, it is probably less to do with his Nazism than with the difficulty of finding good translations", and Tore Rem applauded that the "novel has finally found a worthy English form." In the same year he was awarded the Leif and Inger Sjöberg Award for his translation of Arne Garborg's Weary Men. Over the next decade Lyngstad subsequently translated the rest of Hamsun's major novels in the interest of restoring the works to their original artistic conception.

Lyngstad was made Distinguished Professor Emeritus of English and Comparative Literature upon his retirement to Port Jefferson, New York where he died on 2 May 2011. He was survived by his wife, Eléonore M. Zimmermann, Professor Emerita of Stony Brook University, and his daughter, Karin H. Lyngstad Hughes.

== Selected works ==
=== Literary criticism ===
- Ivan Goncharov (1971, co-author)
- Jonas Lie (1977)
- Sigurd Hoel's Fiction (1984)
- Knut Hamsun, Novelist: A Critical Assessment (2005)

=== Translations ===
==== Knut Hamsun ====
- Hunger (1996)
- Rosa (1997)
- Pan (1998)
- On Overgrown Paths (1999)
- Mysteries (2001)
- The Last Joy (2003)
- In Wonderland (2004)
- Victoria (2005)
- Growth of the Soil (2007)

==== Sigurd Hoel ====
- The Troll Circle (1991)
- Road to the World’s End (1995)
- Meeting at the Milestone (2002)
- A Fortnight Before the Frost (2010)

==== Dag Solstad ====
- Shyness and Dignity (2006)
- Novel 11, Book 18 (2008)
