= Victoria (1979 film) =

1979 film

- Directed by: Bo Widerberg
- Written by: Bo Widerberg; Knut Hamsun
- Based on: Victoria by Knut Hamsun
- Produced by: Edward R. Pressman
- Starring: Michaela Jolin; Stephan Schwartz
- Cinematography: Anders Cederlund; Hanno-Heinz Fuchs
- Edited by: Henrik Georgson; Tord Pååg
- Release date: 1979
- Running time: 89 minutes
- Countries: Sweden; West Germany
- Language: Swedish

Victoria is a 1979 Swedish drama film directed by Bo Widerberg based on Knut Hamsun's 1898 novel. It was entered into the 1979 Cannes Film Festival.

== Cast ==
In alphabetical order

- Hans Christian Blech
- Erik Eriksson as Johannes' Father
- Christiane Hörbiger as Victoria's Mother
- Thor W. Jacobsen
- Michaela Jolin as Victoria
- Gustaf Kleen
- Peter Schildt
- Stephan Schwartz as Johannes
- Pia Skagermark as Camilla
- Sigmar Solbach as Otto
