= Tore Hamsun =

Norwegian painter and novelist (1912-1995)

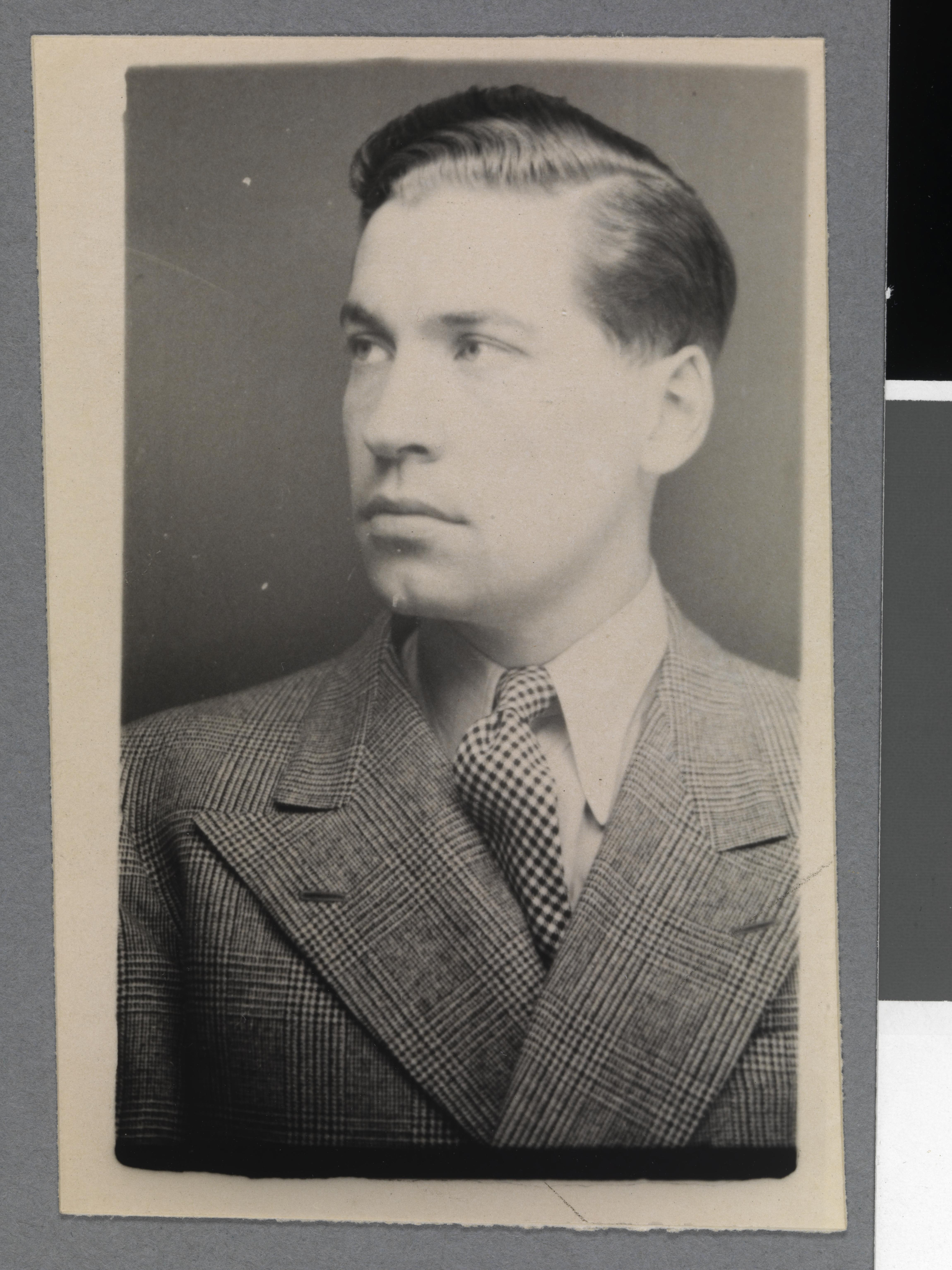
- Tore Hamsun in 1938
- Born: March 6, 1912; Hamarøy, Norway
- Died: January 10, 1995 (aged 82); Oslo, Norway
- Occupations: Painter, writer, publisher
- Parent(s): Knut Hamsun, Marie Hamsun

Tore Hamsun (/ˈhɑːmsʊn/; Norwegian: [ˈhɑmsʉn]; 6 March 1912 – 10 January 1995) was a Norwegian painter, writer, and publisher born in Hamarøy Municipality. He was the son of the Nobel Prize winning novelist Knut Hamsun and actress Marie Hamsun.

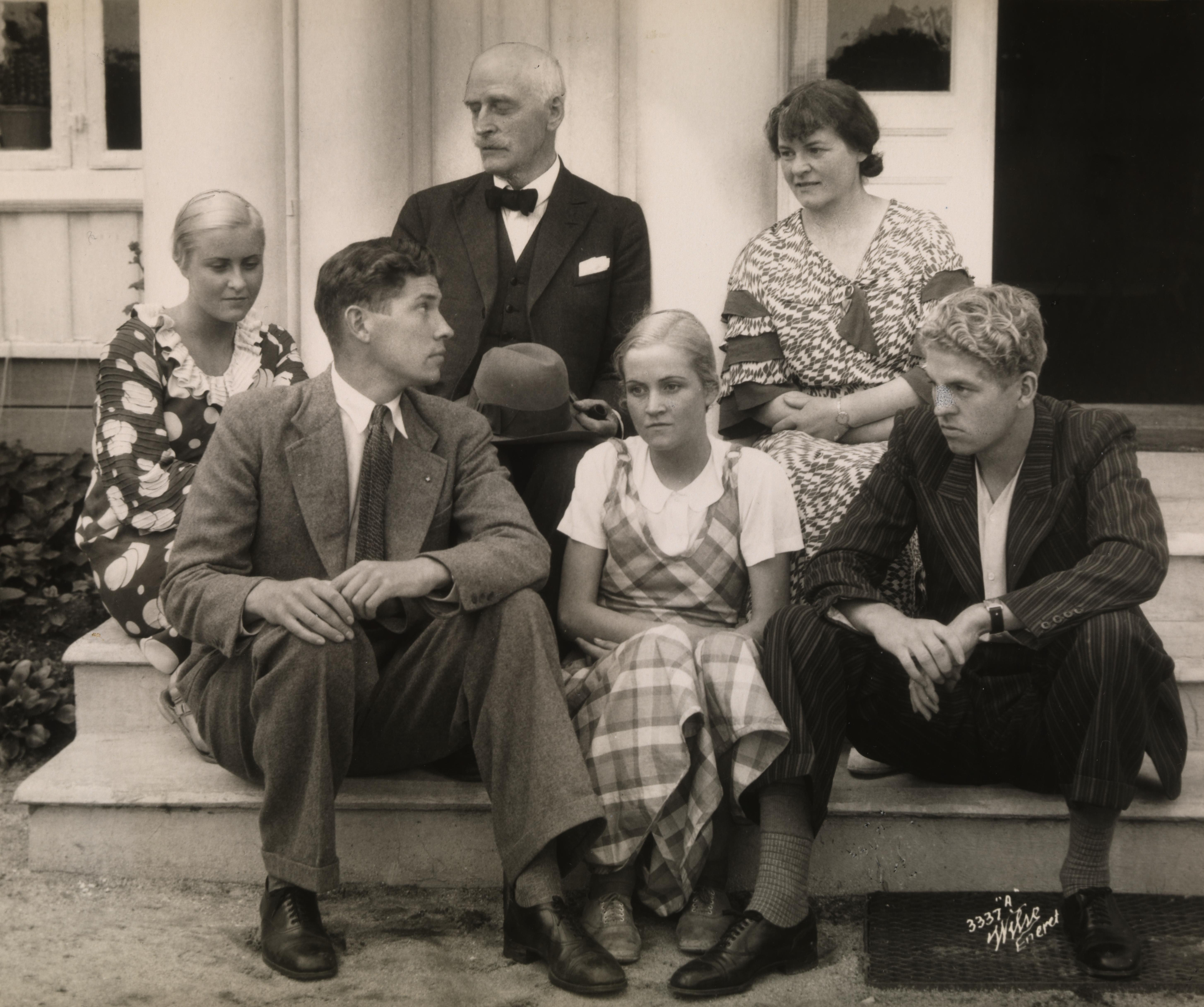
Marie and Knut Hamsun with children Tore, Arild, Ellinor, and Cecilia in 1933

At the age of five, his family moved from Hamarøy to Nørholm, a large agricultural property in Grimstad Municipality. Like the rest of his three siblings, he showed artistic ability at a young age but was the only one to take up a career in art. In 1933, he began Torstein Torsteinssons painting school and studied at an Art Academy in Munich from 1934 to 1935. Hamsun later completed studies at the Norwegian National Academy of Fine Arts in Oslo and debuted as a painter in 1940. He was remembered for his landscape paintings influenced by French Impressionism. Some of his paintings contained or were based on motifs derived from his father's books.

From 1942 to 1944, Hamsun reluctantly accepted the position as temporary publishing director of Gyldendal Norsk Forlag publishing company after Harald Grieg, a close friend of Tore's father, was arrested in 1941. His father, Knut Hamsun was of the founders and owners of the publishing company. During the Second World War, Hamsun helped Max Tau flee to Norway. At the end of the war, Hamsun was sentenced to nine months jail for membership in the Nasjonal Samling. He was imprisoned for five months.

In 1940, Hamsun published Mein Vater Knut Hamsun (My Father Knut Hamsun) and in 1956, he published a collection of his father's poems. Hamsun had inheritance rights to his father's farm Nørholm but gave it to his brother Arild Hamsun and settled nearby in Nørholmskilen.

Hamsun married pianist Ruth Elisabeth Grung and had three children with her. In 1953, he married painter Marianne Doris Ferring and also had two children. Tore Hamsun died after a traffic accident in Oslo in 1995 and was buried in the Eide cemetery.

== Publications ==
- 1940: Mein Vater Knut Hamsun. Leipzig. Paul List (publisher).
- 1952: Knut Hamsun – min far, biography
- 1956: Knut Hamsun som han var. Et utvalg av hans brev
- 1959: Knut Hamsun
- 1987: Knut Hamsun, min far, expanded edition
- 1984: Mannen fra havet, novel
- 1986: Mørk himmel over Puerto Bravo, novel
- 1987: Rhapsody in Blue, novel
- 1990: Efter år og dag, autobiography
- 1956: Knut Hamsun som han var; et utvalg brev. Edited by Tore Hamsun.
- 1970: Knut Hamsun: Brev til Marie. Edited by Tore Hamsun
