= Knut Hamsun Centre =

Museum and educational centre in Hamarøy, Norway

Coordinates: 68.0847°N 15.6456°E

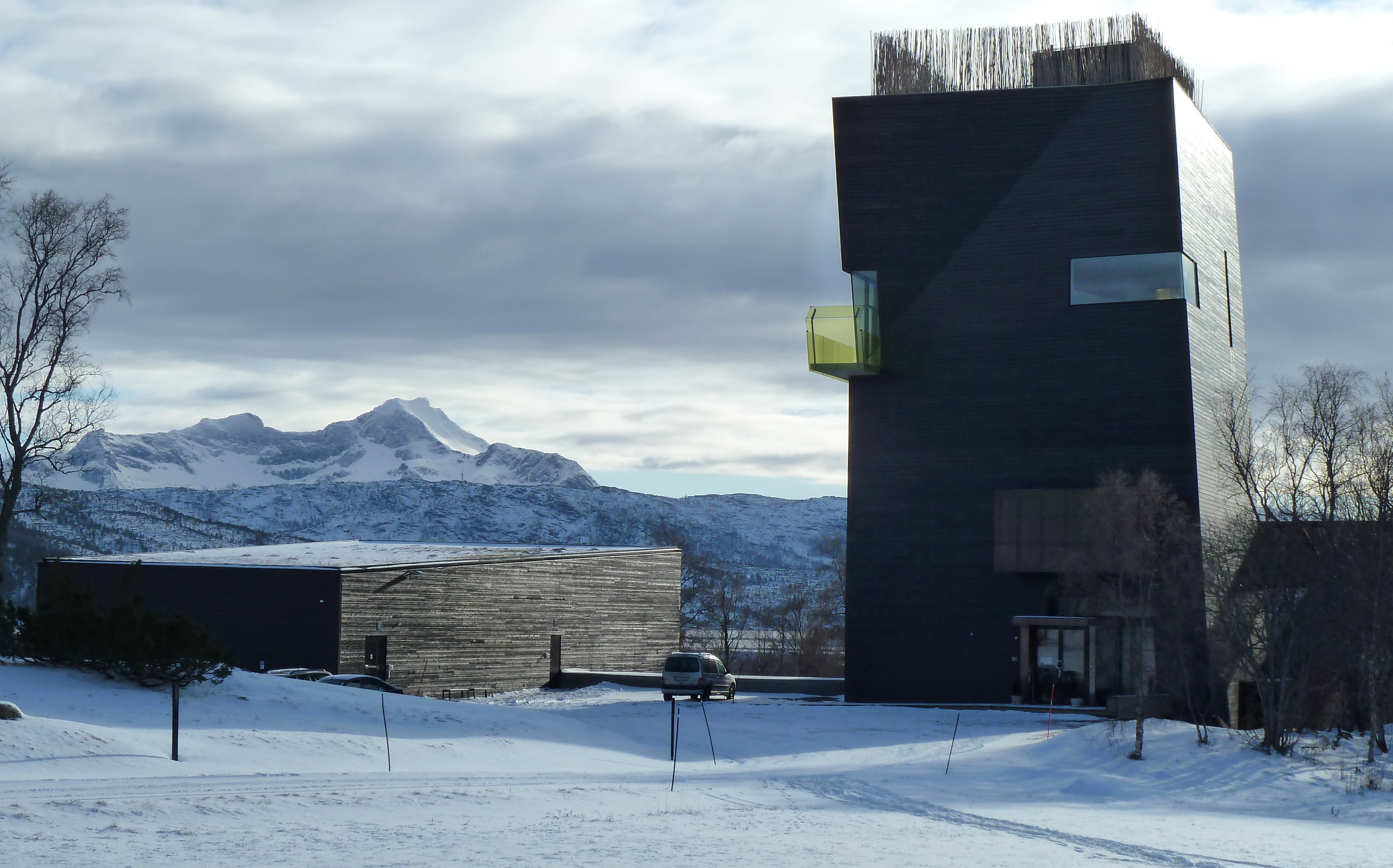
Knut Hamsun Centre

The Knut Hamsun Centre (Norwegian: Hamsunsenteret) is a museum and educational centre in Hamarøy Municipality in Nordland county, Norway. It is dedicated to the life and work of the writer Knut Hamsun.

The architect Steven Holl was first contacted about designing a centre for Knut Hamsun in 1994. He traveled to Hamarøy and made a watercolour of the centre's design that looks quite similar to the building today. Holl was inspired by the Hamarøy nature and scenery, by Norwegian building tradition with stave churches and sod roofs, and by Hamsun's literature—especially the early works Hunger (1890) and Mysteries (1892). Steven Holl has described the Knut Hamsun Centre as "concretizing a Hamsun character in architectonic terms", and he continues: "The concept for the museum, 'Building as a Body:Battleground of invisible Forces,' is realized from inside and out." This concept is a quote from the 1974 translation of Hunger by Robert Bly. The buildings' design has generated considerable attention and debate, and the Knut Hamsun Centre has received several national and international architecture awards.

Holl originally wanted the centre to be built close to Hamsun's childhood home in Hamsund, but local authorities moved it 5 km east, to Presteid, where Knut Hamsun spent a significant part of his childhood with his uncle. The building process was delayed due to a long-time struggle with local red tape. The newspaper Morgenbladet referred to it at one point as "Norway's most discussed non-existing building".

The Knut Hamsun Centre was finished on August 4, 2009, the 150th anniversary of Knut Hamsun's birth, and the exhibition about Hamsun's life and work opened for the public in June 2010. The exhibition is structured thematically and deals with topics like Knut Hamsun's childhood in Hamarøy, Hamsun's support of Germany during World War II, and modernism or proto-modernism in Hamsun's writing.

Administratively, the centre is subordinate to Nordland Museum, and the museum director is Bodil Børset.
