= The Ring is Closed =

1936 novel by Knut Hamsun

- Author: Knut Hamson
- Language: Norwegian
- Publication date: 1936

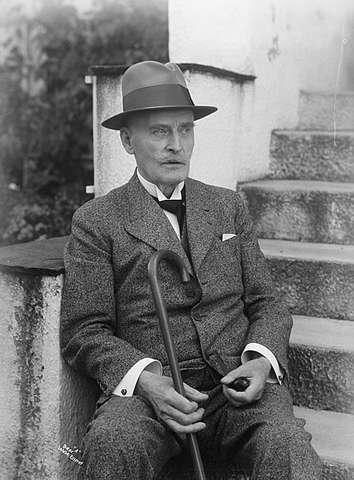
Knut Hamsun in 1936

The Ring is Closed (Norwegian: Ringen sluttet) was the last novel by the Norwegian author Knut Hamsun. The book was published in 1936. In it, Hamsun writes once again about love that creates a fatal flaw for one party in a relationship.

There is a line of destiny from Nagel in Mysteries (1892) until Abel in The Ring is Closed. Readers meet a resigned man who eventually stops fighting, who is still from a borderland and still an exceptional person, but has given up all of his duplicitous tricks and charlatanism.

In The Ring is Closed, Hamsun returns to the starting point of his writing, the enigmatic human mind. Hamsun himself described it this way in Gyldendal's Christmas catalog: "The Ring is Closed is the best I have done both as fantasy and thought. I think the reader can probably assume that I have some discretion in this."

An English translation of the novel by Eugene Gay-Tifft was published in 1937.
