= Harald Schwenzen =

Norwegian actor and film director

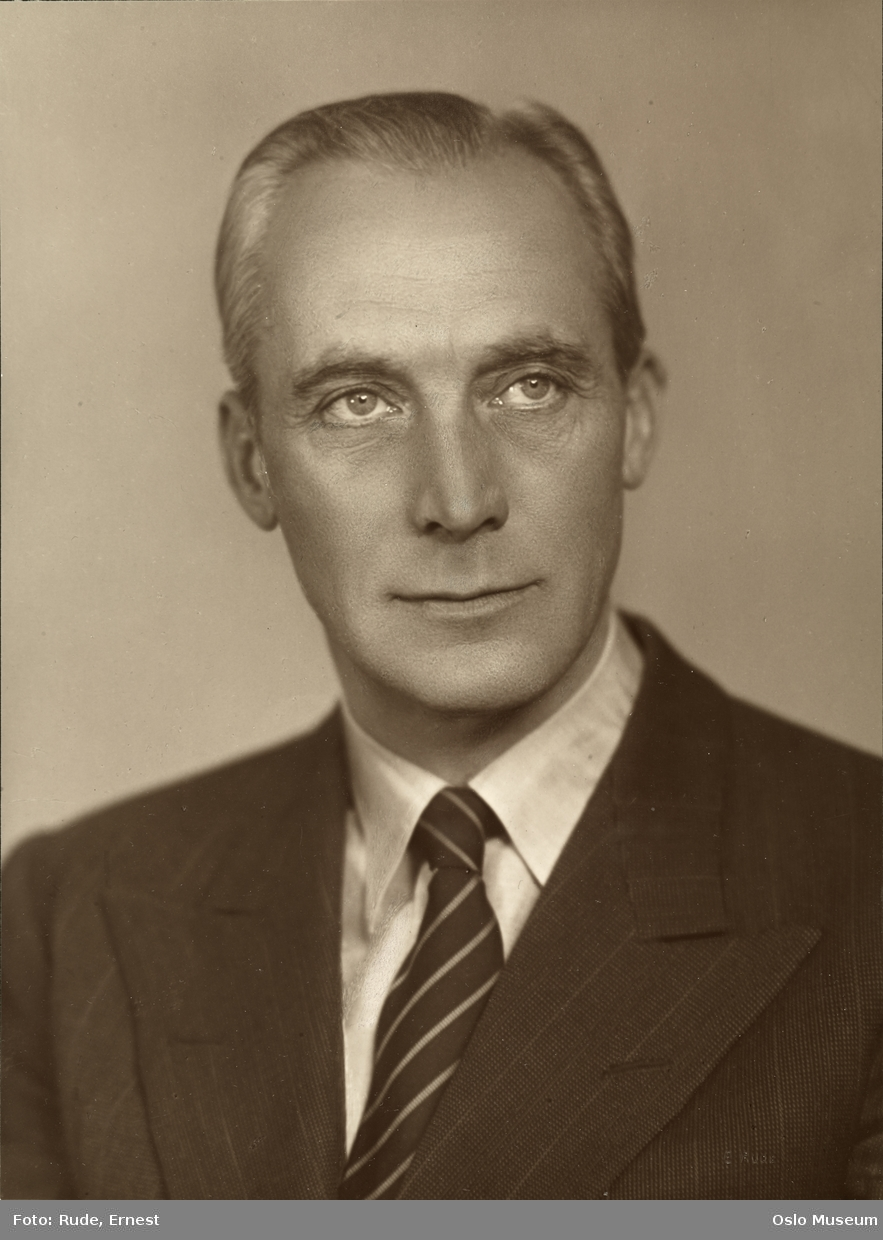
- Born: 18 May 1895; Glücksburg
- Died: 16 April 1954; Oslo
- Spouse(s): Astri Gulbrandsen
- Awards: King's Medal of Merit in gold (1951)

Harald Schwenzen (18 May 1895 – 16 April 1954) was a Norwegian actor and director.

Born in Glücksberg, Germany, he relocated to Norway where he made his stage debut at Nationaltheatret in 1918, and played for this theatre for many years. Schwenzen was known for playing lead roles such as Don Carlos and Peer Gynt.

He made his debut as a film actor in 1920 in Victor Sjöström's film adaptation of Hjalmar Bergman's Mästerman. Schwenzen was script writer and director for the 1922 film adaption of Knut Hamsun's Pan. In 1929, he played a leading role as a lawyer Sadolin in the Norwegian film Laila.

He chaired the Norwegian Actors' Equity Association during the occupation of Norway by Nazi Germany, and was arrested and sent to Grini and Sachsenhausen concentration camps. After his release and the end of the war, he continued appearing on Norwegian stages and in films. In 1948, Schwenzen played the role of the German general von Falkenhorst in the Operation Swallow: The Battle for Heavy Water.

Schwenzen was awarded the King's Medal of Merit in gold in 1951. He died in Oslo in 1954.

== Filmography ==
=== Actor ===
Film	Year
A Lover in Pawn	1920
Pan	1922
Två konungar	1925
To the Orient	1926
Laila	1929
Lalla vinner!	1932
Kommer du, Elsa?	1944
Operation Swallow: The Battle for Heavy Water	1948
Trollfossen	1948
Alt dette og Island med	1951
Den evige Eva	1953

=== Director ===
Film	Year
Pan	1922

== Gallery ==
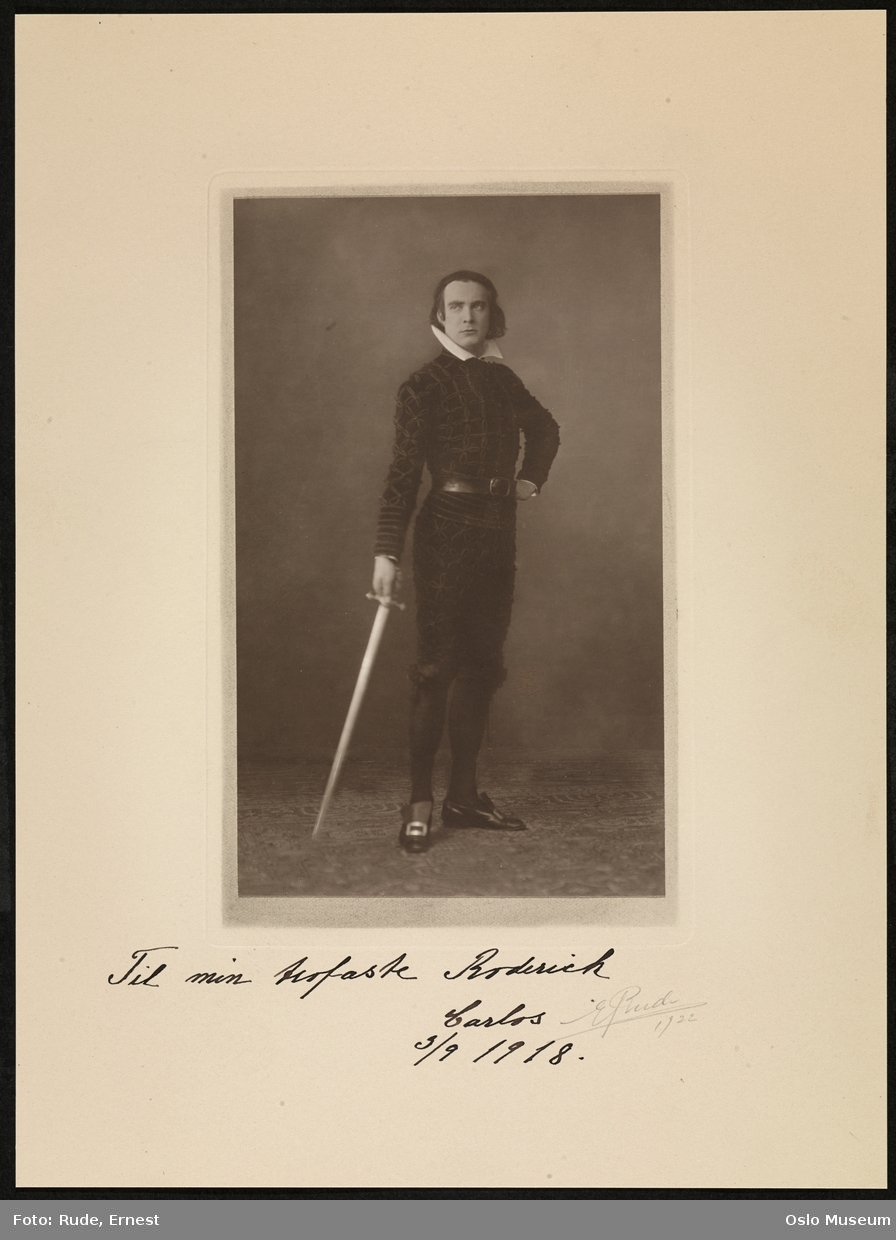
Schwenzen in Don Carlos

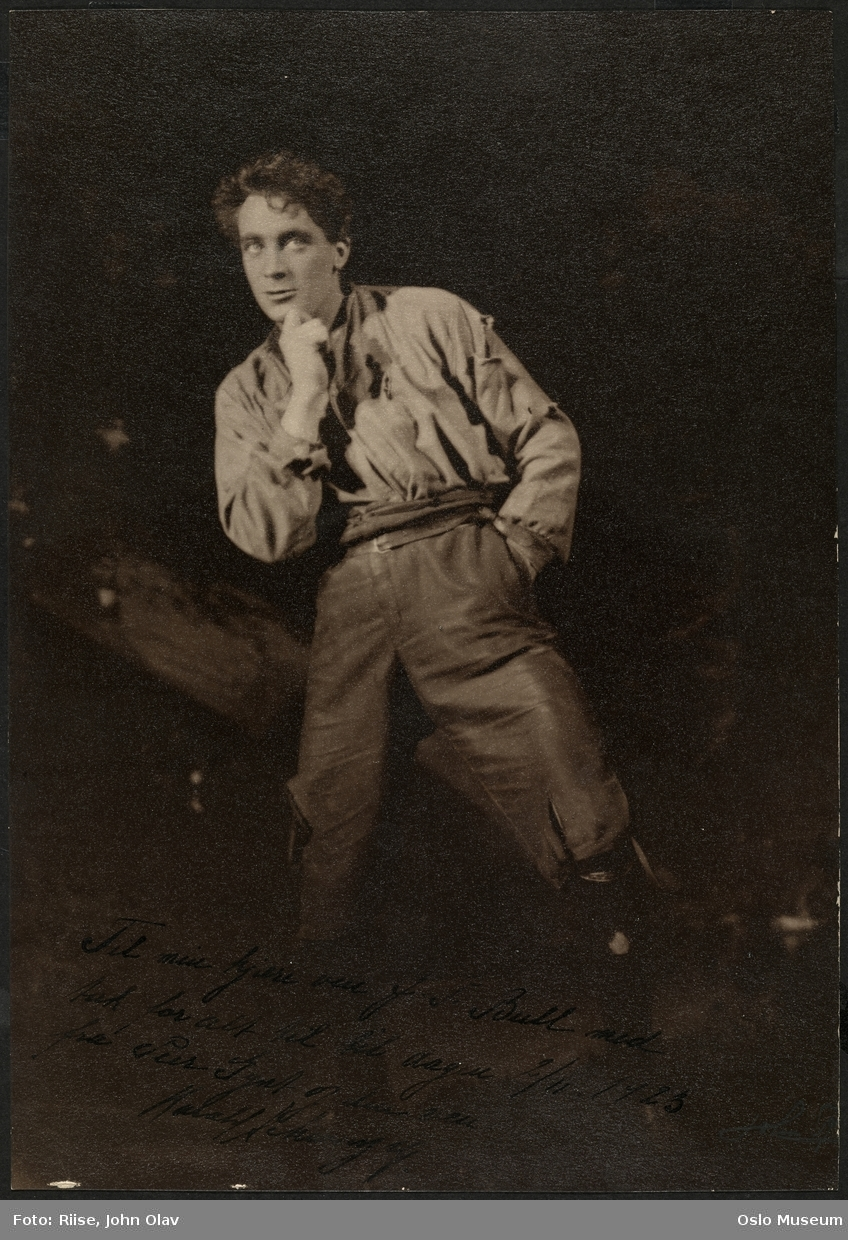
Schwenzen as Peer Gynt

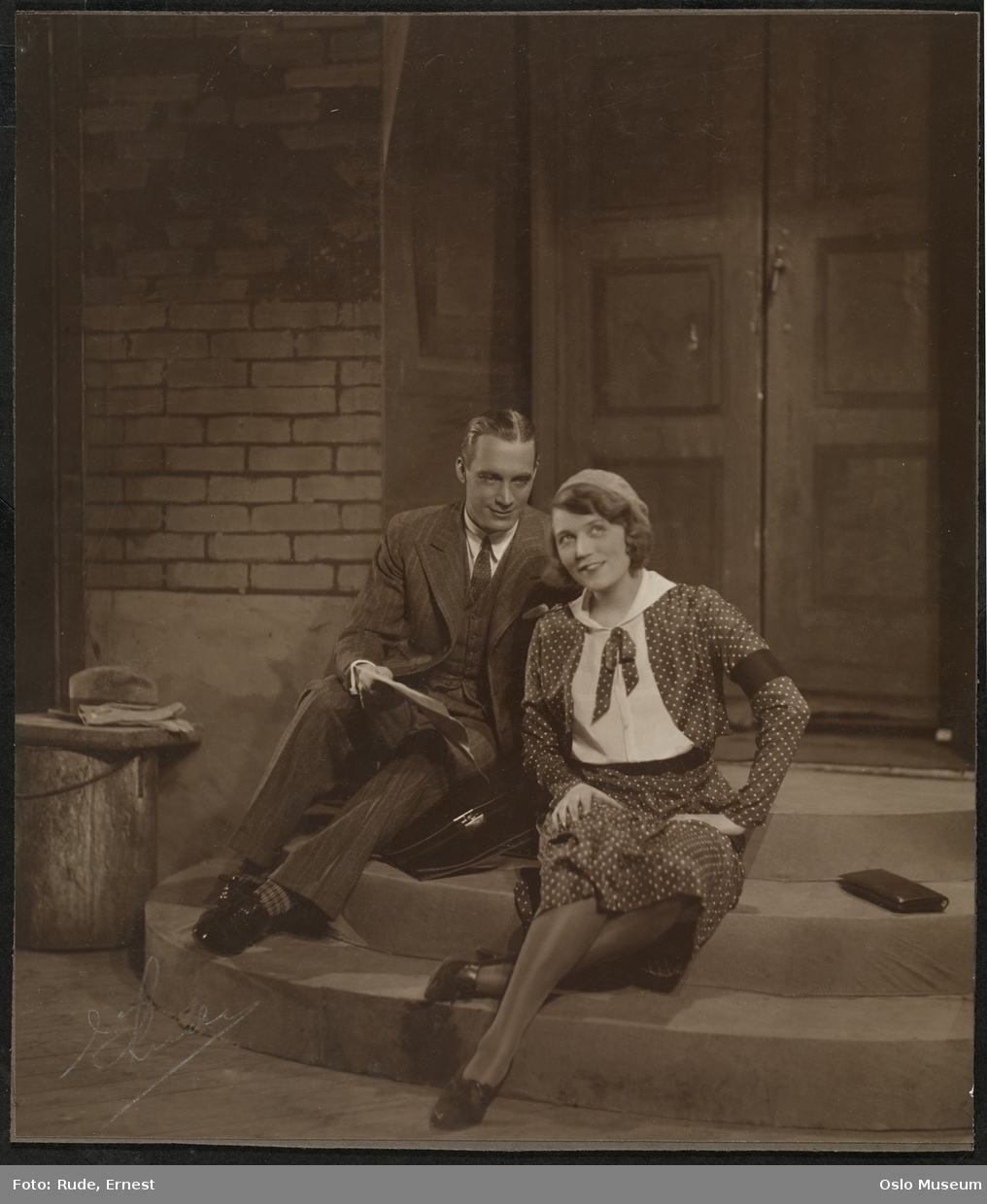
Schwenzen and Tore Segelcke in A Doll's House

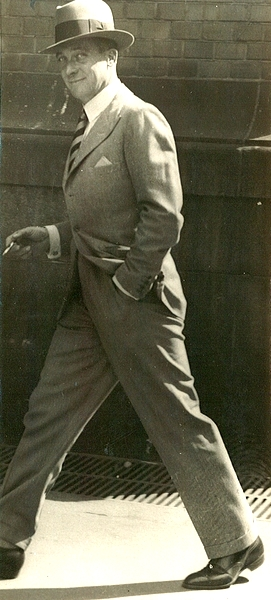
Schwenzen c. 1930–1935
