= Under the Autumn Star =

1906 Book by Knut Hamsun

Under the Autumn Star (Norwegian: Under Høststjærnen. En Vandrers Fortælling) is the first book in Knut Hamsun's "wanderer trilogy." It was published in 1906 in Kristiania (now Oslo) by Gyldendal. The other books in the series are A Wanderer Plays on Muted Strings (1909) and The Last Joy (1912).

The story's main character, Knut Pedersen, is named after the author. Pedersen flees the bustle of the city and seeks to return to the countryside. He lives a wandering life, in which he joins casual acquaintances in seeking various work on different farms. The protagonist is constantly in love and, as often in Hamsun's books, these love affairs are completely unsuccessful.
