= Lasse Kolsrud =

Norwegian actor

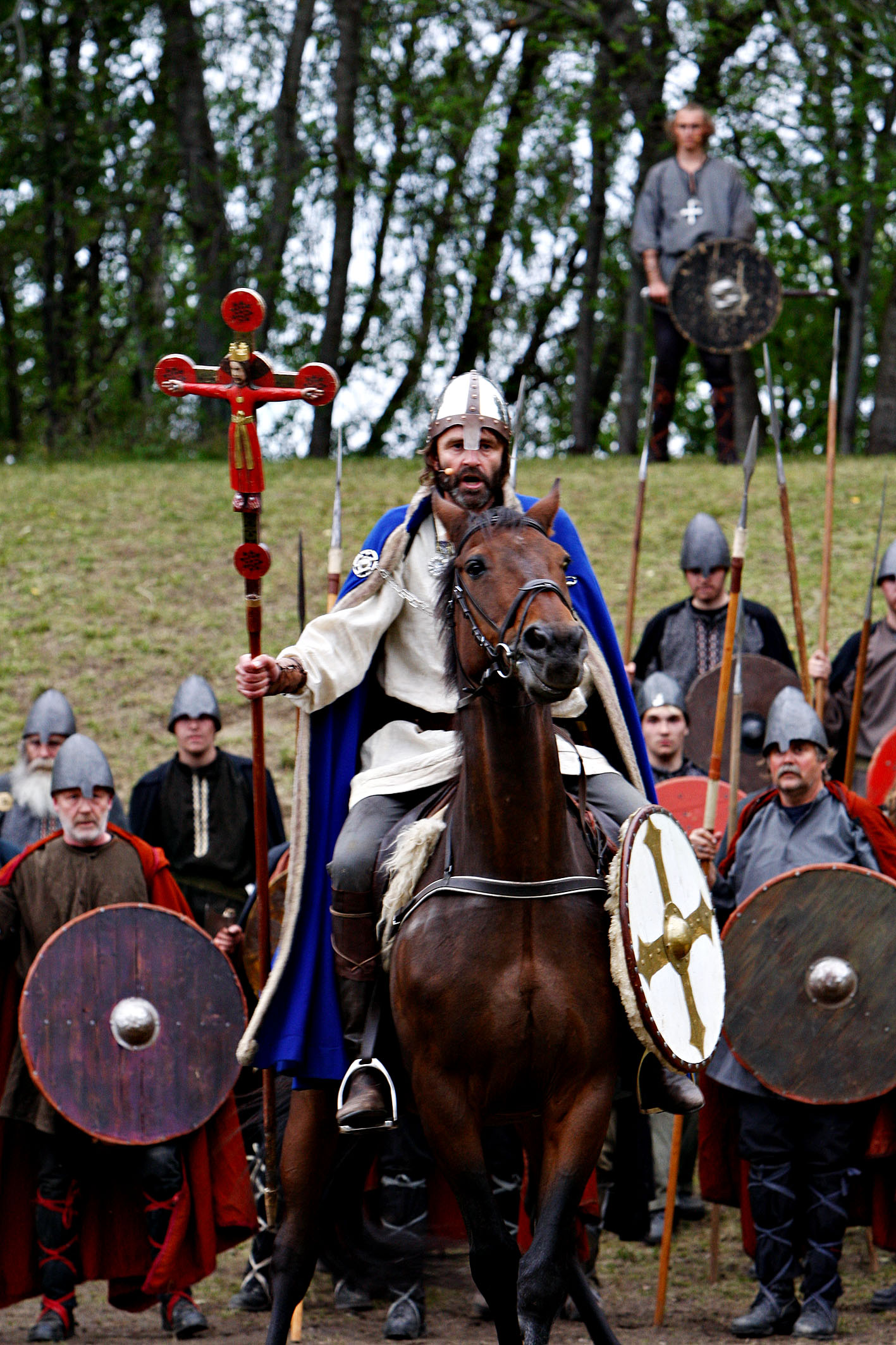
- Lasse Kolsrud as the king in The Saint Olav Drama, 2008
- Born: March 27, 1959 (age 66); Moss, Norway
- Occupation: Actor

Lasse Kolsrud (born March 27, 1959) is a Norwegian actor and director.

He has performed at the Trøndelag Theater, the Norwegian Theater, and on film. He has also directed the theater version of Frode Grytten's novel Bikubesong at the Norwegian Theater. For his dramatization and direction of this play, he received the Hedda Award in the Most Promising Newcomer category in 2004.

Kolsrud received the Norwegian Theater Critics Award in 2004.

== Filmography ==
- 1982: Krypskyttere as Tom, a soldier
- 1992: Svarte pantere as the defense attorney
- 1994: Villhesten as Mona's father
- 1995: Pan as Lieutenant Thomas Glahn
- 1997: Salige er de som tørster as Håkon Sand
- 1999: Evas øye as Cordoba
- 2002: Glasskår as Victor's father
