= Laila (1929 film) =

1929 film

- Movie poster for Laila
- Directed by: George Schnéevoigt
- Screenplay by: George Schnéevoigt
- Based on: Lajla: skildringer fra Finmarken [Laila, or, Sketches from Finmarken] by Jens Andreas Friis
- Produced by: Helge Lunde
- Starring: Mona Mårtenson; Tryggve Larssen; Harald Schwenzen
- Cinematography: Valdemar Christensen, Allan Lynge
- Edited by: George Schnéevoigt
- Production company: Lunde-Film
- Distributed by: Norrøna-Film AS; AB Svensk Filmindustri; International Film
- Release date: 1929
- Running time: 181 minutes
- Countries: Norway, Denmark

Laila is a 1929 Norwegian black and white silent drama film. The film was written, directed, and edited by George Schnéevoigt. Mona Mårtenson, Tryggve Larssen, and Harald Schwenzen played the leading roles.

== Plot ==
Shopkeeper Lind is taking his daughter on a long journey to a distant church to be baptized. His daughter is with a servant in the last sled, which trails behind out of sight and comes under attack by a wolf pack. In the confusion that arises as they flee, the baby falls out of the sled. Jåmpa, a Sámi man, finds the baby and takes her to his Sámi employer, the rich Aslag Laagje, who adopts her to be his daughter. Laagje baptizes the child as Laila. A year later, Laagje visits Lind and his bereaved wife, and realizes that Laila is their daughter. He returns Laila to them, but not long afterwards the plague decimates the village and kills her parents. Jåmpa goes to the village and finds Laila in the care of an elderly couple. He takes Laila back to Laagje, and she grows up together with Laagje's adopted son, Mellet, who falls in love with her. Laila, however, eventually meets her cousin Anders Lind and become fond of him. After Anders helps rescue her after a canoe accident, they arrange to rendezvous at midnight, but Anders cannot come because his father falls ill and dies. Laila believes he has betrayed her and agrees to marry Mellet. With the aid of Jåmpa and at the last moment, Anders arrives at the church just before the wedding ceremony concludes. Laila and Anders resolve all and become engaged.

== About the film ==
Laila was directed and edited by George Schnéevoigt, who also wrote the film's script based on Jens Andreas Friis's Lajla (novel). The book, originally published in Norwegian in 1881 as From Finmarken, was translated into a Swedish in 1882 with the title Lajla : en Berättelse Från Lappmarken. Lunde Film produced the film with Helge Lunde as production manager. The interiors were recorded in Nordisk Film's studio in Valby. Denmark and the exteriors were filmed in Outer Billefjord and Skoganvarre (both in Porsanger Municipality) plus locations in Karasjok, Bossekop, Skjærvøy, Geilo, and Ustaoset. The film was shot by Valdemar Christensen and Allan Lynge.

The film premiered on 6 October 1929 at the cinema Palace in Denmark. On 12 October 1929, the film was previewed on the National Theatre Oslo, and on 14 October 1929, it had a Norwegian bi-premiere at the Circus World Theater and the Kinopaleet in Oslo. It had a Swedish bi-premiere on 11 November 1929 at Röda Kvarn, Stockholm and the Olympia in Borås. The title was named Laila in Denmark, Norway, and Sweden, Laila - Die Tochter des Nordens in Germany, and Laila, La Figlia del Nord in Italy. In Norway, the film was distributed by Norrøna-Film AS, in Sweden by AB Svensk Filmindustri, and in Denmark by International Film (Sophus Madsen).

Several of the actors in the film had previously worked with Schnéevoigt in the 1928 film Viddernas Folk.

The movie was released in 2011 on DVD by Flickeralley.com.

== Cast ==
Performers in Laila
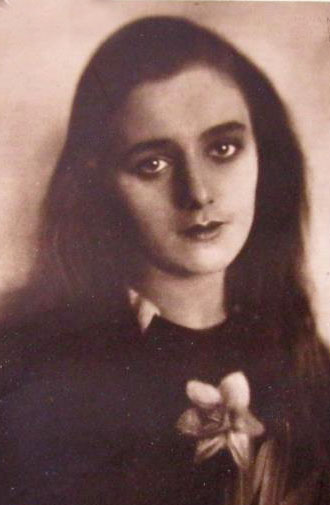
Mona Mårtenson

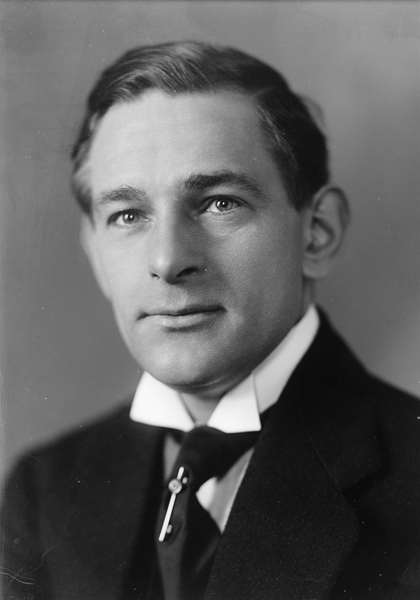
Tryggve Larssen

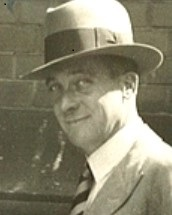
Harald Schwenzen

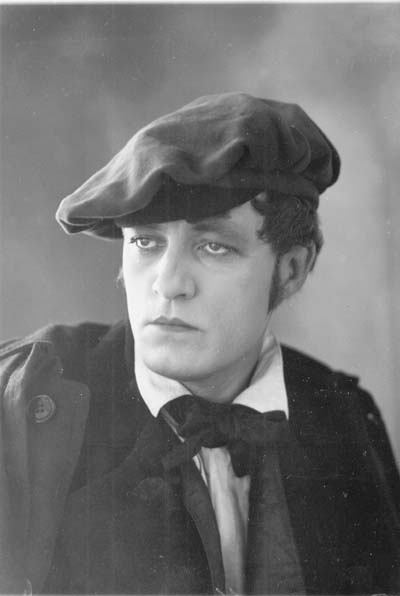
Peter Malberg

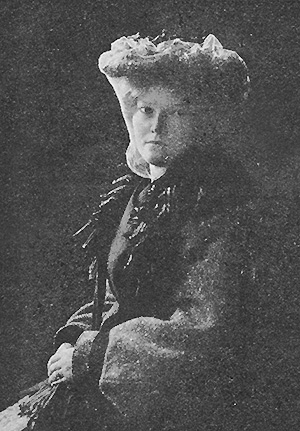
Cally Monrad

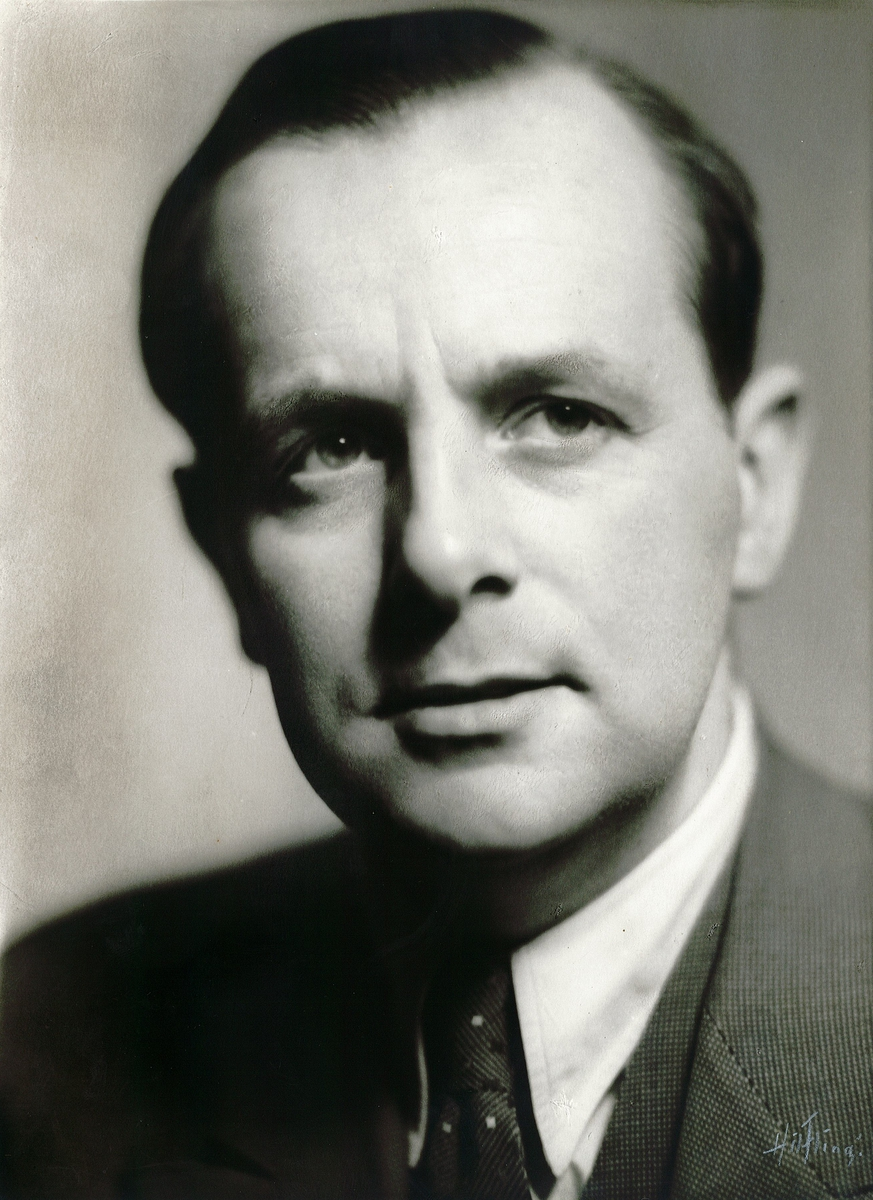
Henry Gleditsch
- Mona Mårtenson – Laila
- Tryggve Larssen – Jåmpa
- Harald Schwenzen – Anders Lind
- Peter Malberg – Aslag Laagje
- Cally Monrad – Mor Laagje, Aslag's wife
- Henry Gleditsch – Mellet, Laagje's foster child
- Finn Bernhoft – C.O. Lind, trader
- Lilly Larson Lund – Lind's wife
- Ibe Brekke – Magga, servant at the Lind house
- Aslag Aslagsen Sara – Lasse, servant at the Lind house
- Rasmus Christiansen – Jens Lind, C.O.'s brother
- Alice O'Fredericks – Inger, Anders's sister
- Mattis Morotaja – Mellet as a boy

== Music ==
- "Laila's love song", music: Einar Ellgen and Fred Bjønner (Lars Minsaas), arranged by Kristian Hauger.
- "Lullaby for Laila", music: Reidar Thommessen.

When the film was released on DVD in 2011, it featured newly composed music by Robert Israel, inspired by Edvard Grieg.
