= Eléonore M. Zimmermann =

Swiss literary scholar

- Born: 2 October 1931 (age 95); Switzerland
- Occupation: Literary scholar
- Spouse: Sverre Lyngstad (died 2011)
- Awards: Guggenheim Fellowship (1971)

Academic background
- Education: Swarthmore College; Yale University
- Thesis: La Formation de l'individu dans le roman allemand et français de 1795 á 1805 (1956)

Academic work
- Discipline: French literature
- Institutions: Wellesley College; Brandeis University; University of Rochester; Stony Brook University

Eléonore Maria Zimmermann (born 2 October 1931) is a Swiss literary scholar based in the United States. A 1971 Guggenheim Fellow, she is author of Magies de Verlaine (1967), La Liberté et le destin dans le théâtre de Jean Racine (1982), and Poétiques de Baudelaire dans Les Fleurs du mal: rythme, parfum, lueur (1998). She worked as a teacher at Wellesley College, Brandeis University, and University of Rochester, before becoming a full professor at Stony Brook University.

== Biography ==
Eléonore Maria Zimmermann was born on 2 October 1931 in Switzerland and later moved to the United States. She was educated at Swarthmore College, where she got a BA in 1951, and at Yale University, where she got an MA in 1953 and a PhD in 1956. Her doctoral dissertation was titled La Formation de l'individu dans le roman allemand et français de 1795 á 1805.

After working at Wellesley College as a French instructor since 1956, Zimmermann moved to Brandeis University in 1959 as lecturer before being promoted to assistant professor in 1960. In 1966, she joined the University of Rochester as an assistant professor, and she was promoted to full professor in 1971. In 1972, she moved to Stony Brook University. She eventually retired as a professor emeritus, and by 2017, she held a weekly table session for French at her retirement home.

In 1967, Zimmermann's book Magies de Verlaine, centered on the work of French poet Paul Verlaine, was published by José Corti. (Note: Reviews of this book:) In 1971, she was awarded a Guggenheim Fellowship for "a study of the concept of fate and liberty in the theatre of Racine", and she subsequently published the 24th volume of Stanford French and Italian Studies, La Liberté et le destin dans le théâtre de Jean Racine (1982), focusing on the themes of freedom and fate in his work. (Note: Reviews of this book:) In 1998, she published another monograph, Poétiques de Baudelaire dans Les Fleurs du mal: rythme, parfum, lueur, which is about the poetry of Charles Baudelaire. (Note: Reviews of this book:) She also wrote several academic articles on literature.

Zimmermann was married to Sverre Lyngstad until his death in 2011.

== Bibliography ==
- Magies de Verlaine (1967)
- La Liberté et le destin dans le théâtre de Jean Racine (1982)
- Poétiques de Baudelaire dans Les Fleurs du mal: rythme, parfum, lueur (1998)
