= Pan (1922 film) =

1922 film

- Directed by: Harald Schwenzen
- Starring: Harald Schwenzen; Hjalmar Fries; Hans Bille; Gerd Egede-Nissen; Rolf Christensen; Lillebil Ibsen
- Cinematography: Johan Ankerstjerne; Thorleif Tønsberg
- Edited by: Kommunenes Filmcentral
- Release date: 1922
- Running time: 96 minutes
- Country: Norway
- Language: Norwegian

Pan is a 1922 Norwegian film directed by Harald Schwenzen. It was the first of four film adaptations of the novel of the same name by 1920 Nobel Prize winner Knut Hamsun, and one of the earliest Scandinavian adaptations of a Hamsun work (preceded only by a 1921 film of Growth of the Soil). It tells the story of a romance between a wealthy woman and a soldier, and was filmed in Nordland and in Algeria (standing in for the Indian locations in the novel).

According to author Donald Dewey, Pan was popular with the Norwegian public, but when Hamsun himself was asked for his reaction, he commented only, "I don’t understand film and I am in bed with the flu," and hung up. Michael Wilmington of the Chicago Tribune describes it as "A fine film and a real discovery".
