= The Telegraphist =

- Directed by: Erik Gustavson
- Written by: Lars Saabye Christensen; Knut Hamsun
- Based on: Sværmere by Knut Hamsun
- Produced by: Tomas Backström
- Starring: Bjørn Floberg; Marie Richardson; Kjersti Holmen
- Cinematography: Philip Øgaard
- Edited by: Sylvia Ingemarsson
- Music by: Randall Meyers
- Release date: 4 February 1993
- Running time: 102 minutes
- Country: Norway
- Language: Norwegian
- Box office: $1.9 million (Norway)

The Telegraphist (Norwegian: Telegrafisten) is a 1993 Norwegian film directed by Erik Gustavson. It is based on the novel Dreamers by Knut Hamsun. It stars Bjørn Floberg and Marie Richardson, as well as Kjersti Holmen, who won an Amanda for her role. The film was also entered into the 43rd Berlin International Film Festival. The film was selected as the Norwegian entry for the Best Foreign Language Film at the 66th Academy Awards, but was not accepted as a nominee. It was the highest-grossing Norwegian film of the year.

== Cast ==
- Bjørn Floberg as Ove Rolandsen
- Marie Richardson as Elise Mack
- Jarl Kulle as Mack
- Ole Ernst as Kaptein Henriksen
- Kjersti Holmen as Jomfru Van Loos
- Bjørn Sundquist as Levion
- Elisabeth Sand as Pastor's Wife
- Svein Sturla Hungnes as Pastor
- Camilla Strøm-Henriksen as Olga
- Johan H:son Kjellgren as Fredrik
- Knut Haugmark as Enok
- Reidar Sørensen as Ulrik
- Maria Bonnevie as Pernille
- Jon Eivind Gullord as the new telegraph operator
