= On Overgrown Paths =

1967 novel by Knut Hamsun

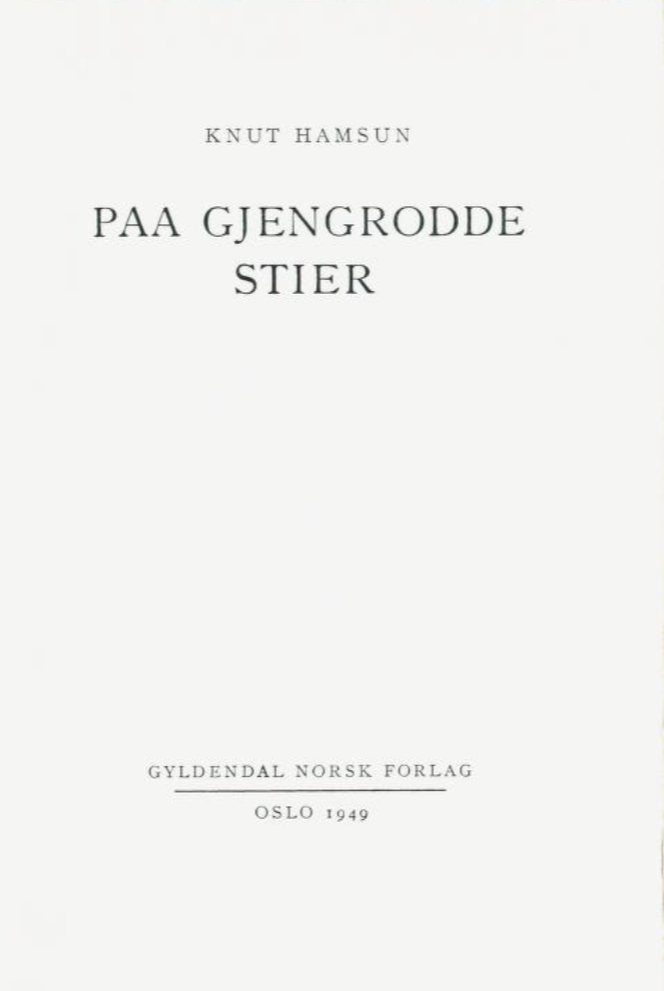
- Author: Knut Hamsun
- Language: Norwegian
- Genre: Memoir
- Publisher: Gyldendal Norsk Forlag
- Publication date: 1949
- Publication place: Norway
- Media type: Print

On Overgrown Paths (Norwegian: Paa gjengrodde Stier) is a memoir by Norwegian author and nobel laureate Knut Hamsun, written from 1945 to 1948 and published in 1949 when Hamsun was 90 years old. Hamsun wrote the book while interned on charges of treason due to his support of the Nazi Party and the collaborationist Quisling regime during the German occupation of Norway.

It was voted Best Norwegian Non-Fiction Book published after 1945 in the Culture and Entertainment category in the NRK program Faktasjekken, by Members of the Norwegian Professional Literary Authors and Translators Association.

== English editions ==
- Translated by Carl L. Anderson published by Paul S. Eriksson Inc., N.Y. (1967); MacGibbon & Kee, London & Aylesbury (1968).
- Translated by Sverre Lyngstad published by Green Integer, Series No.22 (1999); ISBN 1-892295-10-5.

== Other languages ==
The novel has been published in German, Italian, Dutch, Spanish, Icelandic, Hungarian, Serbian (translated by Mirko Rumac; Beograd: LOM, 2011), Bosnian, French, Estonian, Czech and Ukrainian. The Bosnian translation was done by Munib Delalić, and it was published by Dobra knjiga d.o.o., Sarajevo, in 2014.

== Film adaptation ==
The writing of this book is shown, in part, in the film Hamsun (1996), directed by Jan Troell. In the film, Hamsun is portrayed by Swedish actor Max von Sydow.
