= Ørnulv Ødegård =

Norwegian psychiatrist

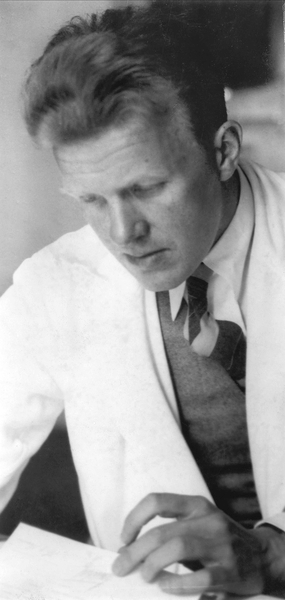
- Ørnulv Ødegård, c. 1935
- Born: 12 April 1901
- Died: 23 February 1986 (aged 84)
- Occupation: Psychiatrist

Ørnulv Ødegård (12 April 1901 – 23 February 1986) was a Norwegian psychiatrist. He was the director of Gaustad Hospital from 1938 to 1972. He was involved as an expert during the trial against Hamsun. He is known for his studies on women who fraternized with German soldiers during the occupation of Norway, where he concluded that their level of intelligence was lower than average. He has also been criticized for the practice of lobotomizing of mental patients.
