= Nørholm (Norway) =

Manor house and agricultural property in Norway

Coordinates: 58°18′13″N 08°30′45″E

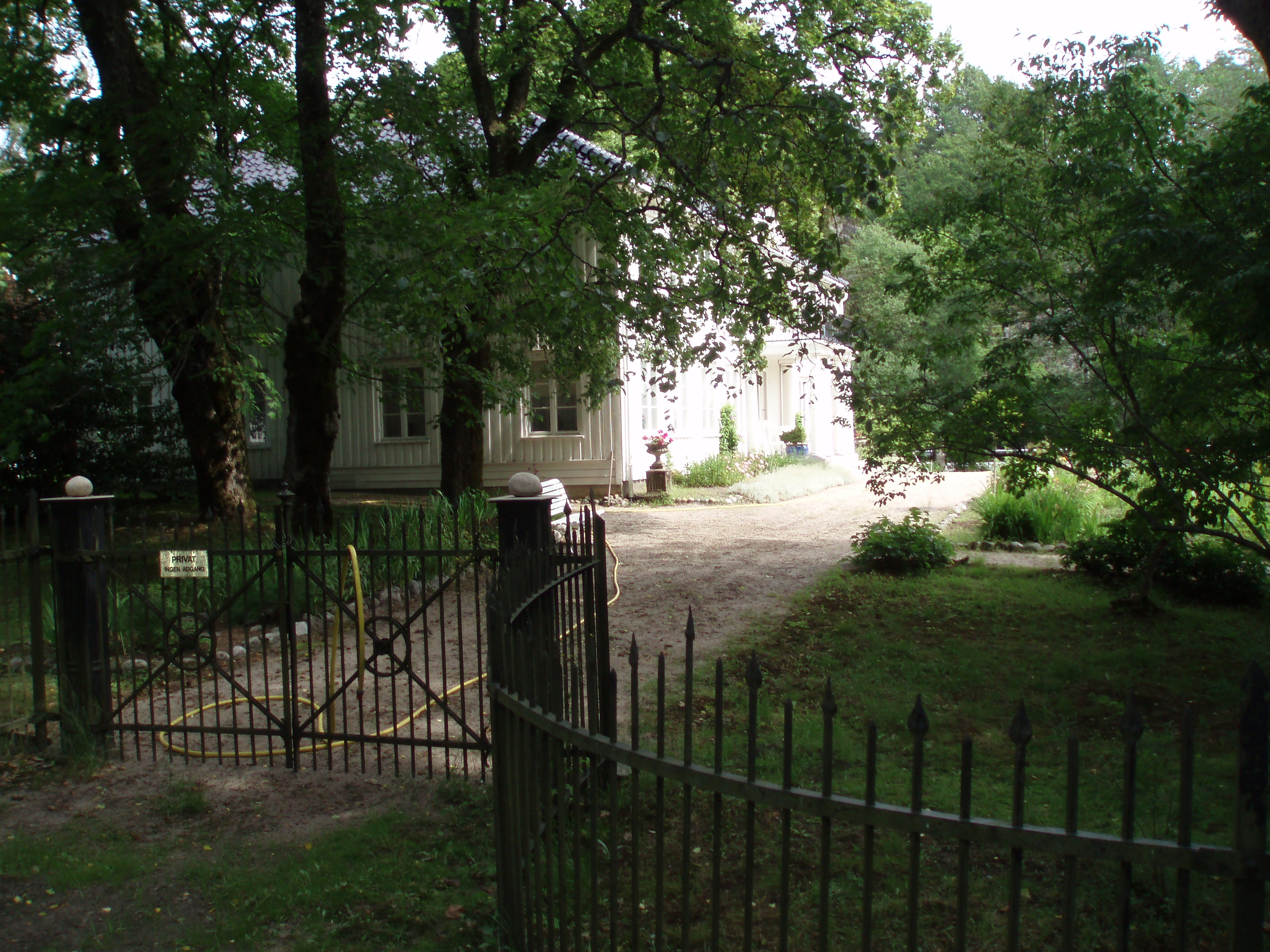
Nørholm, 2006

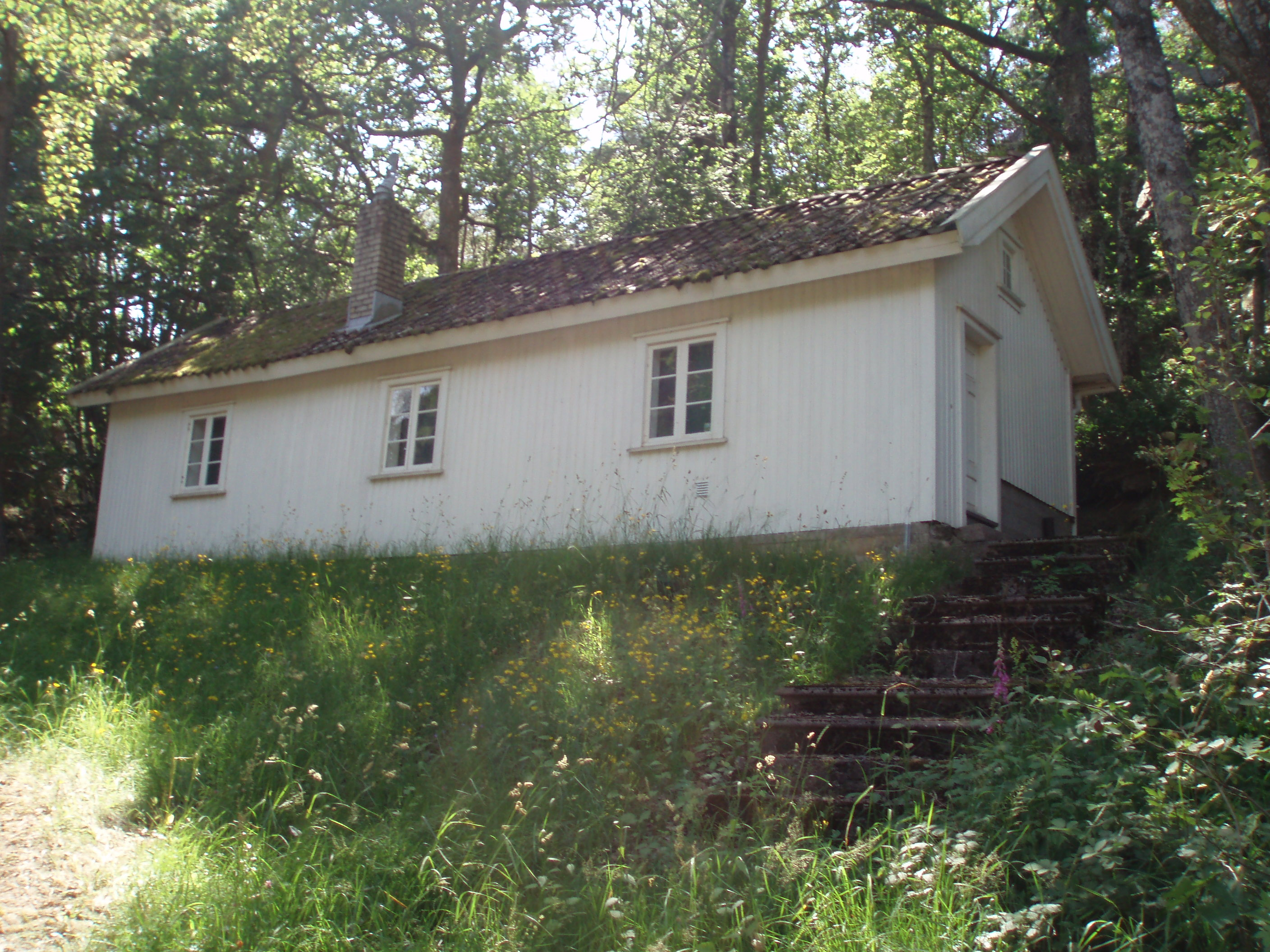
"Dikterstuen", Nørholm, 2006

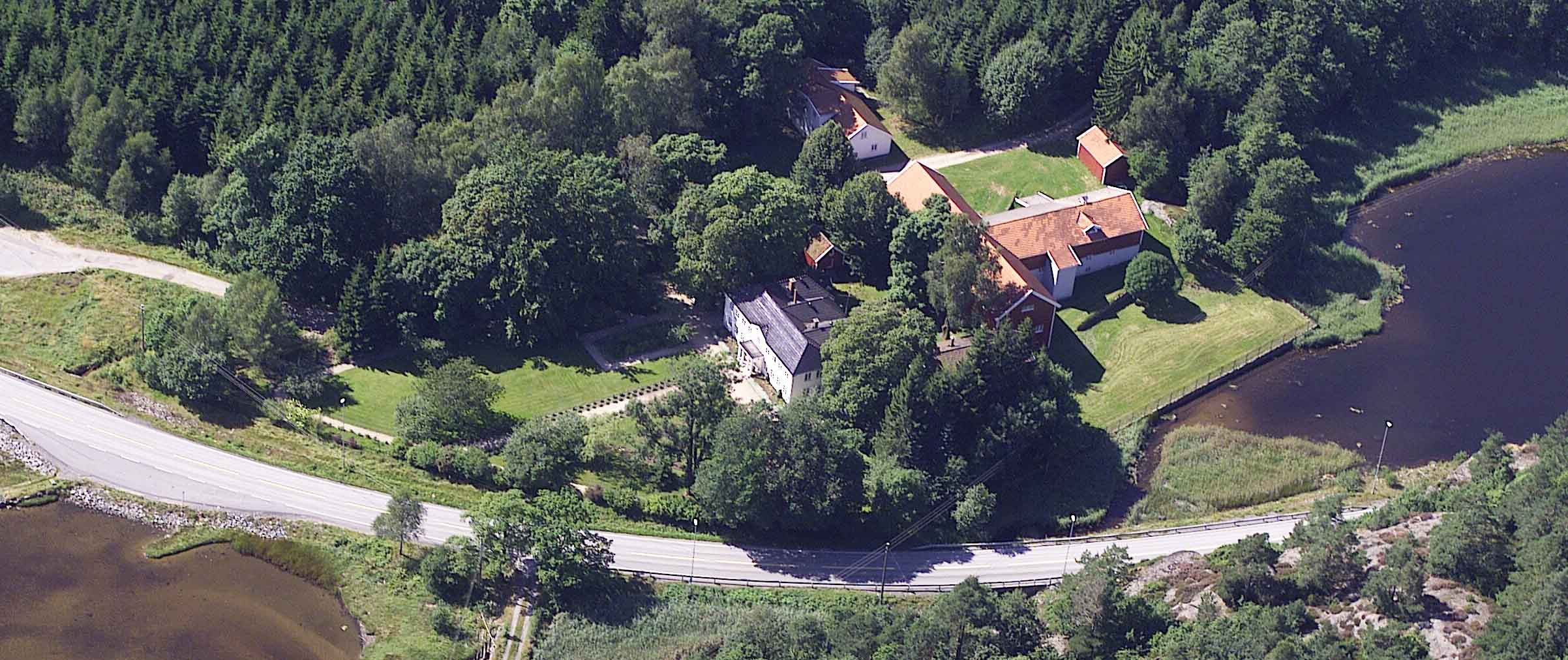
Nørholm

Nørholm, also called Nørholmen, is a manor house and agricultural property on 185 hectares (460 acres) in Grimstad Municipality in Agder county, Norway. The estate is known mostly because of one of its previous owners was Nobel Prize-winning author Knut Hamsun.

== History ==
Nørholm was one of the more notable and historic farms of the traditional district of Agder. The manor historically belonged to noble families often of Danish origin.

The property was bought by Knut Hamsun in 1918, and since then has been owned by members of the Hamsun family. The financial award associated with the Nobel Prize made it possible for Knut Hamsun to expand the property significantly, and to live a life as farmer, much like the protagonist of his novel Growth of the Soil which had earned him the Nobel Prize in Literature. The current main building is from 1830, but was expanded by Hamsun in a neoclassical style. He also built several roads on the property.

Nørholm conservation was established in 1989 through the will of Ellinor (1915-1987), the daughter of Knut Hamsun and Marie Hamsun. The Nørholm Foundation (Stiftelsen Nørholm) was created in 1995 by Victoria Hamsun, the daughter of Arild Hamsun (1914-1988) who was Knut and Marie's youngest son. The property is managed by Ole Andreas Hamsun Rustad, the great grandson of Knut and Marie, in cooperation with the Nørholm Foundation. The Sørvika cottage was separated from the property and owned by Knut's son, Tore. That property was sold in 2011 and is no longer owned by the family or the foundation.
