= The Last Joy =

1912 novel by Knut Hamsun

The Last Joy (Norwegian: Den sidste Glæde, later Den siste Glæde) is the third book in Knut Hamsun's "wanderer trilogy." The novel was published in 1912, when Hamsun was just over 50 years old and had much of his writing ahead of him, but already knew the weight of age. The novel is set in the first person; the narrator has lived his life and now has the last joy of opting out of everything and just being with himself in nature. However, in Hamsuns's manner he cannot do it without revealing his self-deception.

The protagonist is unable to live alone in his cabin in the woods, although he may seem to want to. Two other key figures are the unctuous Solem and Miss Thorsen, whom the protagonist cannot help but fall in love with. Here his self-imposed distance from the joys and sorrows of human life becomes a major problem—like Lieutenant Glahn in Pan, he does not want to perceive his true feelings; on the contrary, he wants to distance himself from them. Thus, like Glahn, he is doomed to misfortune. It is different with Solem, who seems to be unreflective about everything life has to offer, and whether he gets it honestly or dishonestly makes no difference to him. Here, too, the first-person narrator acts disengaged and pretends that he does not care, but especially after Solem begins to woo Miss Thorsen it becomes clear that the narrator is simply deceiving himself. "The last joy" is to sit "in my room and have it good and dark around me," and he will never have done with it. Whereas Pan addresses young love's denial and intoxication, The Last Joy depicts the old. In Pan, Glahn's unreliability is a consequence of necessity; he is driven into it and it is his defense, whereas the narrator in The Last Joy simply chooses to be wrong.

The English title The Last Joy was used to refer to the novel before it was translated. The work was translated into English as Look Back on Happiness in 1940 and as The Last Joy in 2003.
