= Hunger (Hamsun novel) =

1890 novel by Knut Hamsun

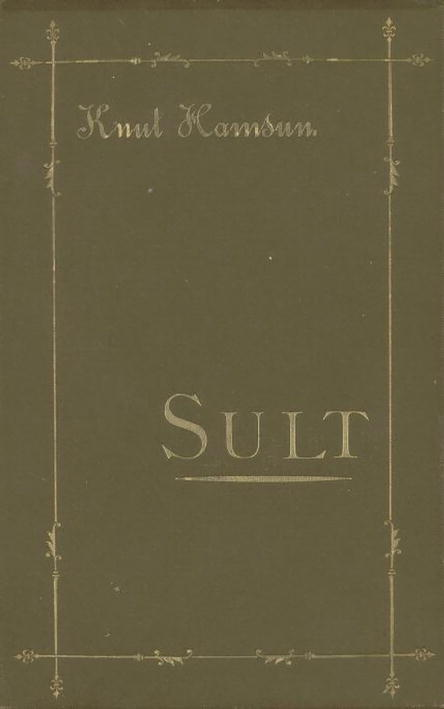
- First edition
- Author: Knut Hamsun
- Original title: Sult
- Translator: George Egerton (1899); Robert Bly (1967); Sverre Lyngstad (1996)
- Language: Norwegian
- Genre: Psychological novel Philosophical novel
- Publication date: 1890
- Publication place: Norway
- OCLC: 69732953

Hunger (Norwegian: Sult) is a novel by the Norwegian author Knut Hamsun published in 1890 by P.G. Philipsens Forlag. The novel has been hailed as the literary opening of the 20th century and an outstanding example of modern, psychology-driven literature. Hunger portrays the irrationality of the human mind in an intriguing and sometimes humorous manner.

== Description ==
Written after Hamsun's return from an ill-fated tour of America, Hunger is loosely based on the author's own impoverished life before his breakthrough in 1890. Set in late 19th-century Kristiania (now Oslo), the novel recounts the adventures of a starving young man whose sense of reality is giving way to a delusionary existence on the darker side of a modern metropolis. While he vainly tries to maintain an outer shell of respectability, his mental and physical decay are recounted in detail. His ordeal, enhanced by his inability or unwillingness to pursue a professional career, which he deems unfit for someone of his abilities, is pictured in a series of encounters which Hamsun himself described as "a series of analyses".

== Plot summary ==
The novel's first-person protagonist, an unnamed vagrant with intellectual leanings, probably in his late twenties, wanders the streets of Norway's capital, Kristiania (Oslo), in pursuit of nourishment. Over four episodes he meets a number of more or less mysterious persons, the most notable being Ylajali, a young woman with whom he engages in a mild degree of physical intimacy.

He exhibits a self-created code of chivalry, giving money and clothes to needy children and vagrants, not eating food given to him, and turning himself in for stealing. Essentially self-destructive, he thus falls into traps of his own making, and with a lack of food, warmth and basic comfort, his body turns slowly to ruin. Overwhelmed by hunger, he scrounges for meals, at one point nearly eating his own (rather precious) pencil and his finger. His social, physical and mental states are in constant decline. In all this, he displays no antagonistic feelings towards 'society' as such, rather he blames his fate on 'God' or a divine world order. He vows not to succumb to this order and remains 'a foreigner in life', haunted by 'nervousness, by irrational details'.

He experiences an artistic and financial triumph when he sells a text to a newspaper, but despite this he finds writing increasingly difficult. At one point in the story, he asks to spend a night in a prison cell, posing as a well-to-do journalist who has lost the keys to his apartment. In the morning he cannot bring himself to reveal his poverty or even partake in the free breakfast provided to the homeless. Finally, as the book comes to a close, when his existence is at an absolute ebb, he signs on to the crew of a ship leaving the city.

== Publication history ==
An extract from Hunger was first published anonymously in the Danish magazine Ny Jord in November 1888. After its full publication in 1890, Hamsun made revisions to the novel's text in subsequent editions in 1899, 1907 and 1916.

=== Translations into English ===
Hunger was first translated into English in 1899 by the writer and feminist George Egerton. Sverre Lyngstad incorrectly claimed that her translation was bowdlerized, specifically the narrator's wandering sexual thoughts and actions. In fact, it was the widely available sixth (May 1921) and later Knopf printings of her translation that were censored, resulting in 263 instead of 266 pages. Stefano Evangelista notes that the Egerton translation "has withstood the passage of time very well. Tore Rem notes that it is "arguably more radical than Lyngstad's translation."

A translation by Robert Bly was published in 1967. Lyngstad has called the Bly translation a "betrayal." He stated that Bly missed Hamsun's mixture of present and past tense, which had reflected the narrator's feverish mind and which Bly replaced with a uniform past tense. He also noted that Bly's translation confused Oslo's streets and places.

The 1996 translation by Sverre Lyngstad has been considered by many to be definitive.

A new translation by Tore Rem and Terence Cave was published in 2023 by Oxford World's Classics.

== Reception ==
Hunger was immediately recognized as the voice of a new generation, quickly made Hamsun famous in the Norwegian literary scene, and is acknowledged as one of the first masterpieces of European modernism. In modern times, author Dea Brovig has named Hunger as his top favorite Norwegian novel.

== Style ==
Author Geoff Dyer has said that Hunger is among the books "so luminously original in style and form as to seem like a premonition, a comet from the future." The book's style has often been called an early example of modernism. Writer Jonathan McAloon has written that Hamsun's 1890's novels, including Hunger, "defied the way thought was usually portrayed, and, read now, the books defy what came after."

Critic and scholar James Wood has said that Hunger was Hamsun's first book-length attack on the typical novel's representation of coherence, which Hamsun thought was fraudulent. Timothy Wientzen has written that Hunger was "quite unlike anything before seen in Scandinavian literature."

The protagonist of the novel displays traits reminiscent of Raskolnikov in Crime and Punishment; the author, Fyodor Dostoevsky, being one of Hamsun's main influences. The influence of naturalist authors such as Émile Zola is apparent in the novel, as is his rejection of the realist tradition.

== Analysis and themes ==
James Wood has argued that the Hunger narrator performs "a grotesque parody of the traditional Christian posture of martyrdom, of fasting and solitude."

Hunger encompasses two of Hamsun's literary and ideological motifs:

- His insistence that the intricacies of the human mind ought to be the main object of modern literature: Hamsun's own literary program, to describe "the whisper of the blood and the pleading of the bone marrow", is thoroughly manifest in Hunger.
- His depreciation of modern, urban civilization: In the opening lines of the novel, he ambivalently describes Kristiania as "this wondrous city that no one leaves before it has made its marks upon him." The latter is counterbalanced in other Hamsun works, such as Mysteries (Mysterier, 1892) and Growth of the Soil (Markens Grøde, 1920), which earned him the Nobel Prize in Literature but also brought about claims of his being a proto-National Socialist Blut und Boden author.

== Legacy ==
Hunger is one of Hamsun's best known and most influential works.

Hunger was named by author Catrina Davies in The Guardian as one of the best books about economic disenfranchisement and the crisis of being unhoused. Davis wrote that the book is "One of the bleakest, most brilliant novels to explore how hand-to-mouth survival traps us in a cycle of despair". She wrote of the narrator, "he’s a human, not a fungible commodity, and retaining his humanity is almost more important to him than staying alive." Hunger was also named by critics on a list of great books "about being alone."

Author Benjamin Myers wrote that Hunger was the book that made him want to be a writer. He said, "[it] turned my mind inside out in my early 20s. I’d read many novels about similarly impoverished, solipsistic half-mad young men – Fante, Genet – but Hunger was something else entirely.”

=== Adaptations ===
Hunger has been adapted into the following films:

- Hunger (1966), a Danish-Norwegian-Swedish film
- Hunger (2001), an American film
- Boy Eating the Bird's Food (2012), a Greek film, loosely based on Hunger
- Hunger, a graphic novel adaptation by Martin Ernstsen, was published in 2019.
- Hunger (2019), a play adaptation by Amanda Lomass.
