= Pan (Hamsun novel) =

Novel by Knut Hamsun

- Early edition cover
- Author: Knut Hamsun
- Original title: Pan
- Translator: Sverre Lyngstad; James McFarlane
- Language: Norwegian
- Genre: Novel
- Publisher: Gyldendal Norsk Forlag; Farrar, Straus and Giroux; Penguin Classics
- Publication date: 1894 (Norway); 1921 (USA)
- Publication place: Norway
- Media type: Print
- Pages: 192
- Preceded by: Ny Jord
- Followed by: Ved Rigets Port

Pan is an 1894 novel by Norwegian author Knut Hamsun. He wrote it while living in Paris and in Kristiansand, Norway. It remains one of his most famous works.

== Plot ==
Lieutenant Thomas Glahn, a hunter and ex-military man, writes for amusement and to pass the time, he says. He has his memories triggered by a keepsake of two green bird feathers that have recently been sent to him from far away.

He narrates his memories of Nordland summers two years ago when he was living alone in a hut in the forest with his faithful dog, Aesop. He says he met a woman who for a while had occupied his thoughts but that he has now quite forgotten her. Upon meeting Edvarda, the daughter of a merchant in a nearby town, they are strongly attracted to each other, but neither understands the other's love. They alternate between spiteful dismissiveness, flirtation, and sincerity, toward each other. Glahn gives two green bird feathers to her as a gift.

Multiple people from the town and elsewhere attempt or wish to court Edvarda. The Doctor, who is friendly to Glahn, explains that Edvarda will never be satisfied with anyone. Glahn interacts normally with various townspeople at gatherings and small social calls, but also resorts to strange impulsive pranks and comments that end up alienating him, though most people remain friendly toward him. He often expresses a preference for the natural landscape rather than people. Glahn has recurring affairs with two other women who sometimes visit the region of his hut: Eva, a townsperson who is ambiguously either the daughter or the wife of the blacksmith, and Henrietta a more distant visitor who sometimes uses Glahn’s woods for chores.

Glahn both causes and suffers a series of tragedies. His hut burns down. He shoots himself in the foot deliberately. He starts a rockslide for fun which accidentally kills a person. He tells Edvarda that he is leaving the town forever. They have an awkward and unfulfilling goodbye conversation. She asks to have his dog, Aesop, as a gift. He later shoots and kills the dog, writing (to himself in narration) that he believes she was going to mistreat it. He hires a person to deliver the dog’s body to her. He crosses paths with Edvarda near the docks as he departs the town, and she thanks him for the dog.

Glahn’s final statements in writing are about how receiving the two green feathers caused him a feeling of cold terror but also amusement. He says that he belongs to the forest and to solitude.

=== Epilogue ===
An epilogue titled “Glahn’s Death” shifts perspective to a letter written by an unnamed man who claims to have been Glahn’s hunting and travel partner for a time after he left Norway. The man says he is withholding details of locations so that no one can trace the story he describes. The man’s letter mocks the family who has been publicly advertising a search for information about Glahn’s whereabouts. He bitterly explains that he hates Glahn and gives some anecdotes apparently laced with jealousy and psychological denial. Glahn also successfully courts a woman, Maggie, who the man had attempted to court. Glahn repeatedly says that he hopes the man’s hunting shot might one day miss and hit Glahn in the throat. Glahn cheerfully moves in front of the man’s line of fire multiple times and pesters him about keeping his gun loaded at all times, for the apparent purpose of killing him. During a hunt, Glahn shoots a bullet past the man’s head, but the man recognizes he intentionally missed to provoke him. They have a brief confrontation in which a Glahn calls him a coward, and the man kills Glahn. The man again ridicules the family who has been searching for Glahn, and gloats that the murder was officially recorded as an accident.

== Themes and symbolism ==
The changing seasons are reflected in the plot: Edvarda and Glahn fall in love in spring; make love in the summer; and end their relationship in the autumn.

The contradicting symbols of culture and nature are important in the novel: Glahn belongs to nature, while Edvarda belongs to culture.

Much of what happens between Glahn and Edvarda is foreshadowed when Glahn dreams of two mythological lovers. The lovers' conversations also foretell the future.

In the main narrative of the book, told in first person by Glahn, he sees himself as awkward and unattractive. The Epilogue shows that is not the case, instead from an outsider's viewpoint Glahn is beautiful, talented and desired.

== Film adaptations ==
The novel has been adapted for film four times. The first was a Norwegian silent film directed by Harald Schwenzen in 1922. In 1937, a German-made version was produced under the sponsorship of Nazi propaganda minister Joseph Goebbels, who considered Hamsun one of his favorite authors. Goebbels had initially attempted to get Greta Garbo for this film, but was unsuccessful, and he did not like the finished film, which became the first foreign film to be released in Norway with its soundtrack dubbed into Norwegian. The next version, a color production by the Swedish studio Sandrews, was directed by Bjarne Henning-Jensen and released in 1962 under the title Kort är sommaren (Summer is short). A Danish-Norwegian-German version, directed by Danish director Henning Carlsen, was released in 1995. The book is also the basis of Guy Maddin's 1997 Canadian film Twilight of the Ice Nymphs and the primary inspiration for Ben Rivers' 2011 docufiction Two Years at Sea.

== See also ==
- Pan (Clune novel), by Michael Clune. 2025.
