= Mysteries (novel) =

1892 novel by Knut Hamsun

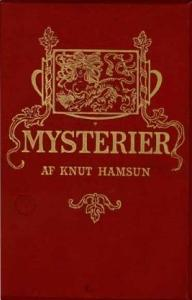
- First edition cover
- Author: Knut Hamsun
- Original title: Mysterier
- Translator: Gerry Bothmer
- Language: Norwegian
- Genre: Psychological novel
- Publisher: Gyldendal Norsk Forlag; Farrar, Straus and Giroux; Penguin Classics
- Publication date: 1892 (Norway); 1922 (USA); 1971 (USA); 2001
- Publication place: Norway
- Media type: Print
- Pages: 352
- Preceded by: Hunger
- Followed by: Redaktør Lynge

Mysteries (Norwegian: Mysterier, 1892) is the second novel by Norwegian author Knut Hamsun. The story concerns a small Norwegian coastal community that is shaken by the arrival of eccentric stranger Johan Nagel, who beguiles the bourgeois townspeople with bizarre behavior, feverish rants, and uncompromising self-revelations. The book is often regarded as pre-figuring later modern literature, has been called a classic, and has been named as a favorite or a great work by several noted writers.

== Plot ==
One summer, a man of about age 28, Johan Nagel, arrives at a town by boat. Flags are flying in honor of the wedding engagement of Dagny Kielland, the parson's daughter. Nagel nervously paces the deck and misses his chance to disembark, although porters have already taken his luggage off the boat. The boat carries him away again. He re-arrives the next day by horse carriage. He is mildly mocked by some townspeople for his boat trouble earlier, but he doesn't notice their comments.

Nagel takes a room at a hotel. His belongings includes a violin case, a trunk, a lifesaver's medal, and a vial labelled "Poison." He has a long friendly conversation with the hotel keeper. Nagel is congenial but casually fails to offer much information about himself when asked, yet very animatedly says that he may decide to stay for a long time. They discuss a recent death of a man in the woods, Karlsen, an apparent suicide that Nagel read about in newspapers. They muse about details of the case and the fact that Karlsen killed himself with a dull pen-knife after being rejected by Dagny Kielland.

In the dining hall one evening, Nagel observes a short-statured man known as Miniman ("Minutten" in Norwegian), whose real name is Grøgaard, being harshly bullied and humiliated by a deputy and others. Nagel interrupts the situation by loudly offering money to Miniman to throw a glass in the face of the deputy, whom he insults. The deputy attacks Nagel but Nagel is skilled at boxing and defeats him. Chaos ensues in the room. When the hotel keeper enters the scene, bystanders all defend Nagel. Nagel invites Miniman up to his room for smoking and conversation. Among other subjects, Nagel makes bizarre theoretical propositions to him, while also inquiring about Miniman's life and the town.

Over several months in the summer, Nagel becomes a social fixture of the town. He befriends and falls in love with Dagny, and attends friendly gatherings with Dagny and other townspeople. He amuses people with unexpected opinions and behavior. He rants about literature and politics, and is harmlessly called out by a townsperson who recognizes him as a known controversial forum-attendee in another town. He also spends much time alone in his room or in the forest, and experiences apparent nervousness and sudden impulses. Long after disappointing people by claiming that his violin case is an empty affectation filled with dirty laundry, he delights people with his violin-playing. His life-saver's medal suspiciously has the name scratched off, and it's unclear whether this is another ploy of modesty. Nagel sends telegrams to himself knowing that the hotel staff will snoop through them and gossip about them, and openly reveals the scheme to Dagny.

Listeners are captivated when he publicly narrates fantastical dreams or visions. In one, he calmly drifts in an aromatic wood boat with a silk sail, and fishes with a silver hook. Someone in the group lightly mocks the dream, but Dagny stammers that the situation was lovely. In another narrated dream, Nagel is lying in bed and becomes encompassed by the vocal sounds of thousands of tiny angels who float around him and settle in his hair, and he recognizes that they are blind. In another dream, a man is imprisoned in a supernatural tangle of tree roots in a marsh and tries to bite Nagel, but can't. Nagel aggressively taunts him, but they eventually hold hands and leave the marsh. The man then takes on a pathetically self-effacing manner. Nagel explains that the man in the dream was Miniman, and Dagny exclaims that she knew it was him much earlier.

Nagel attempts to give money to a relatively impoverished woman who lives alone, Martha Gude, but disguises it by claiming that a random chair in her home is a valuable antique that he, as an antique enthusiast, must buy at any price. Martha frustrates Nagel by humbly refusing the money. He later makes an intense marriage proposal to her. They have a short romance that is soon ruined by her distrust of him. He thinks that Dagny convinced Martha to reject him.

Ultimately, Dagny scornfully rejects Nagel and mistrusts his behavior and identity. He goes into the woods and drinks his vial of poison to die alone. He waits in agony for several hours, then desperately attempts to vomit up the poison, and begins making an imaginary soliloquy to Dagny. He eventually realizes that someone had replaced his poison vial with water.

In preparation to leave the town, Nagel attempts to pay the hotel keeper for the summer stay, but has a mental crisis and can't find any money. Nagel becomes feverish and bed-ridden. Sara, a hotel worker, partly cares for him as he talks nonsense. He is seized with fear about a missing ring that apparently he must find before midnight. He believes that he is called to the sea, and dreams that he is trying to drown himself. In a vision, Miniman tauntingly tells him that the drowning attempt will fail because Nagel is a good swimmer. Nagel wakes up from the dream greatly relieved that it wasn't real, but still appears to be in the grips of a delusional psychological condition. He runs to the docks and into the sea, and dies by drowning.

The story ends with Dagny and Martha conversing on a walk. They discuss an unspecified event in which Miniman had done something to Martha and came to a bad end. Dagny expresses puzzlement that Nagel had predicted Miniman's fate. The women support each other physically while walking on a slippery icy street.

== Background ==
While working on Mysteries, Hamsun was publishing essays and delivering lectures that criticized the state of Norwegian literature and promoted a new form of unpredictable psychological writing. Some of Hamsun's critical views received hostile reactions at the time, and he continued his political and cultural stance in dialog of the fictional character Nagel (who for example calls Ibsen's plays “dramatized wood pulp”), and used the book itself as an embodiment of his theory of literature. Hamsun had specifically criticized stereotypes of elder authors and called for characters of "changeable and divided mind" in whom "inconsistency is their fundamental trait."

Scholar and translator Sverre Lyngstad explains that Hamsun had asserted in an 1890 article that for literature to accurately represent mental life, writers must explore "the mimosa-like sensitivities of the psyche and the secret stirrings in the remote parts of the mind, the incalculable welter of emotions, the random wanderings of thought and feeling, the uncharted, trackless journeys of heart and brain, the mysterious activities of the nerves, the whisper of the blood, the entreaty of the bones, all the unconscious life of the mind."

Lyngstad has argued that Hamsun's situation in life resembled Nagel's in the book, in that he was moving from town to town, had shaky finances, and caused debates by presenting radical views on literature and national culture.

In response to a critic's comments about the character Miniman, Hamsun claimed in a letter to his publisher that the character exactly matched a real person.

== Publication ==
The novel was originally published in Norwegian in Norway in 1892. In 1922, Knopf published the first English translation, a bowdlerized translation by Arthur G. Chater. Another translation by Gerry Bothmer was published by Farrar, Straus and Giroux in 1971.

A third translation into English was made by Sverre Lyngstad and published by Penguin in 2001. Lyngstad stated that Bothmer's earlier work was an "egregious betrayal" [...] "less a translation than a free adaptation" and that it "drastically simplified Hamsun's quirky uniqueness and verve."

== Reception ==
Mysteries received some contemporary criticism, but later appraisals have been positive. Bjørnstjerne Bjørnson, a later Nobel-prize winner and considered one of the "greats" of Norwegian literature, called it one of the "great books of literature." Critic Carl Nærup called it "crude" and Danish theologian Peter Kirkegaard called it a "rather unsuccessful book." Dutch critic Nico Rost wrote approvingly that the main character, Nagel, "belongs to European literature." In 1924, Danish critic Jørgen Bukdahl called it "Hamsun's best and most honest novel." Modern Norwegian novelist Knut Faldbakken called it "an abortive masterpiece."

Henry Miller reviewed the Bothmer translation in 1971 and wrote that he had read the book 7 or 8 times, saying "it is closer to me than any other book I have read." He called the main character an "adorable incomprehensible anti-hero" who plays the part of "the clown, the buffoon, the lover, the con man, the fixer, the patron, the phony detective, the intellectual, the artist, the enchanter. The madness of it all is created right before your eyes. [We] don't want it to end. We enjoy every tragic moment of this hopeless love affair." John Updike also reviewed the 1971 translation, and wrote that it lacked the "weird jubilation of the masterpiece Hunger." Updike said that the "formal control that usually imposes crystalline dignity on Hamsun's brutal vision here slackens; the plot abounds in [...] unsolved mysteries, and editorial digressions. Nevertheless, there are [...] frequent streaks of brilliant fancy, and always a presiding vitality."

In a retrospective, Jonathan McAloon at The Guardian wrote, "Mysteries is one of my favourite books and I can’t figure out how it works. [...] The characters feel simultaneously strange and familiar. [...] Hamsun defies us to come up with a why [for the main character] and we are without a clue. The narrator seems as baffled as we are." McAloon also wrote that the style "still feels advanced and new" and that the book formally jokes about certain techniques 30 years before the techniques are conventionally thought to have been normalized or invented, i.e. with James Joyce and Virginia Woolf.

Jeffrey Frank at the New Yorker wrote that the title aptly fits "one of Hamsun's oddest and richest books" and called it "surpassingly original [and] every bit as inflamed as Hunger." A New York Times essay about Hamsun in 2009 said that the book is written in a "fathomless new way." The Guardian called it a classic. Cartoonist Lars Martinson wrote, "I've read Mysteries several times in multiple translations, and it always captivates me. It somehow manages to come off as both playful and disturbing at the same time. [...] Apparent simplicity [in style] conceals a murkier core. [And] rather than being frustrating, the loose ends are a big part of the book's charm."

In a heavily critical 1975 essay discussing several Hamsun works, William Cloonan at the Boston Review wrote that Dagny Kielland was "banal", "more middle-class than mysterious", and part of a pattern of women in Hamsun's works where "he invites us to view them as provocative creatures capable of totally disrupting a man's life [yet] Hamsun never delineates their personalities sufficiently [for us to] understand why they have such powerful effects on men." Cloonan also wrote that the relationship between Nagel and Martha is part of an "unintentionally comic" and "adolescent" Hamsun pattern in which the hero is "ill at ease and unsuccessful with the young women he desires, but does quite well with older women [who give] warmth and affection and place no demands on him."

Scholar Reinhard Friederich wrote that Mysteries is "one of the most provocative works of late 19th-century fiction" and stated that Hamsun's late-life political attitudes caused discussion of his earlier literary reputation and influence to become reduced to shallow half-hearted mention. Critic and scholar James Wood wrote that Mysteries is one of Hamsun's greatest novels.

== Legacy ==
Jeffrey Frank at the New Yorker wrote that "one can recognize in Mysteries the shape and spirit of the modern novel, produced at a time when the modern novel did not yet exist." Similarly, a book-length work by scholar Martin Humpál argues that Hamsun's novels Hunger, Mysteries, and Pan, are significant roots of modernist narrative. James Wood wrote that Mysteries and Hamsun's other two early novels "founded the kind of Modernist novel [...] of crepuscular states, of alienation and leaping surrealism, and of savage fictionality." Scholar Gerald Gillespie names Mysteries as an "ancestor of the so-called postmodern metaphysical genre."

Scholar Reinhard Friederich argues that Mysteries influenced the structure and themes of The Castle by Franz Kafka, who was known to admire Hamsun's work.

== Adaptations ==
The novel inspired Paul Juon to write his tone-poem for cello and orchestra, "Mysteries" op.59, written in 1914 and published in 1928.

The novel was the basis of the 1978 Dutch film Mysteries directed by Paul de Lussanet and starring Sylvia Kristel and Rutger Hauer.

The Norwegian National Opera and Ballet commissioned Johan Kvandal to adapt the novel into an opera. His opera Mysteries premiered on 15 January 1994 at the Norsk Festival held in conjunction with the 1994 Winter Olympics.
