= Victoria (novel) =

1898 Knut Hamsun novel

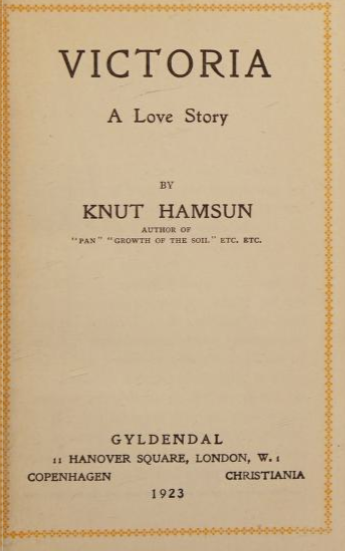
- Title page for Victoria: A Love Story (1923 edition)
- Author: Knut Hamsun
- Language: Norwegian
- Genre: Fiction
- Published: 1898
- Publication place: Norway

Victoria (Norwegian: Victoria. En kjærlighedshistorie, 1898) is a novel by Knut Hamsun.

== Overview ==
The story is about Johannes, the son of a miller, who falls in love with Victoria, the daughter of a rich landowner. The novel follows their lives as they grow up. Johannes struggles with class differences and later becomes a successful writer. Victoria, because of her family’s money problems, is forced to marry Otto, a lieutenant.

The novel is a lyrical excursion into unconsummated love. Love that is described as “Blood and Blossoms.”

Hamsun later named his daughter "Victoria", after the novel.

== Adaptations ==
- Victoria or Viktoriya, a 1917 Russian silent film directed by Olga Preobrazhenskaya
- Victoria, a 1935 German film directed by Carl Hoffmann
- Viktoria, a 1957 West German TV movie directed by Frank Lothar, starring Elisabeth Müller
- Victoria, a 1979 Swedish-German co-production directed by Bo Widerberg
- Victoria or Viktoriya, a 1988 Soviet film directed by Olgerts Dunkers
- Victoria, a 2013 Norwegian film directed by Torun Lian
