= Marie Hamsun =

Norwegian actress and writer

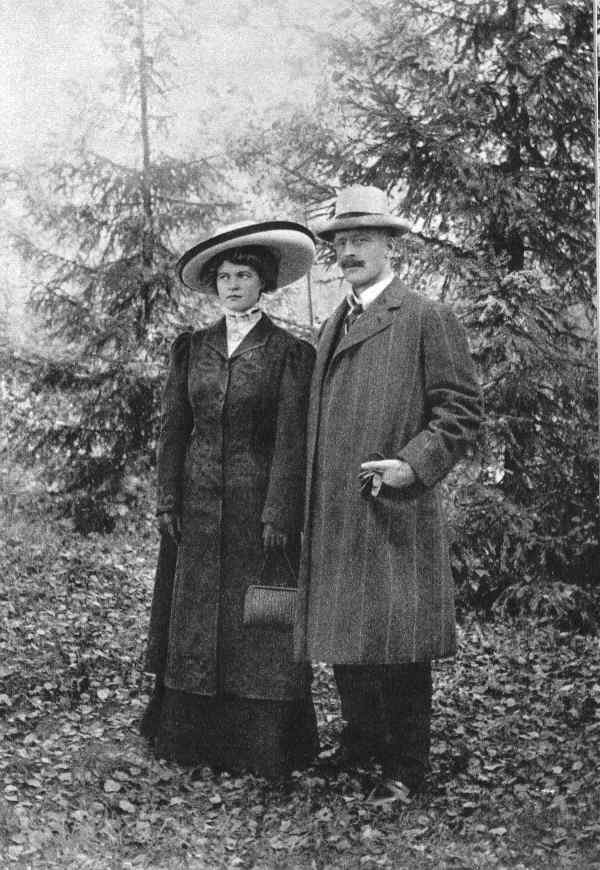
- Marie with her husband Knut in 1909
- Born: Marie Andersen; 19 November 1881; Elverum, Hedmark, Sweden–Norway
- Died: 4 August 1969 (aged 87); Nørholm, Norway
- Occupations: Actress, writer
- Spouse: Knut Hamsun (m. 1909; died 1952)
- Children: 4

Marie Hamsun (/ˈhɑːmsʊn/; Norwegian: [ˈhɑmsʉn]; née Andersen; 19 November 1881 – 4 August 1969) was a Norwegian actress and writer.

== Biography ==
She wrote two collections of poems and several children's books. Hamsun's work has been translated to several other languages, including Swedish, German, English, Latvian, Finnish and Dutch. She also published two biographies about her life with Knut Hamsun: Regnbuen (The Rainbow) (1953) and Under gullregnen (1959).

Marie Hamsun shared her husband's political views, and her support for the Third Reich and the German occupation forces during World War II exceeded that of her husband. She was a member of Vidkun Quisling's Nazi party Nasjonal Samling, and she frequently toured German cities reciting the works of Knut Hamsun during the early years of the war. In 1947, she was sentenced to three years of hard labor for treason, but due to a general amnesty she was jailed for only 9 months.
