= Knut Hamsun =

Norwegian novelist (1859–1952)

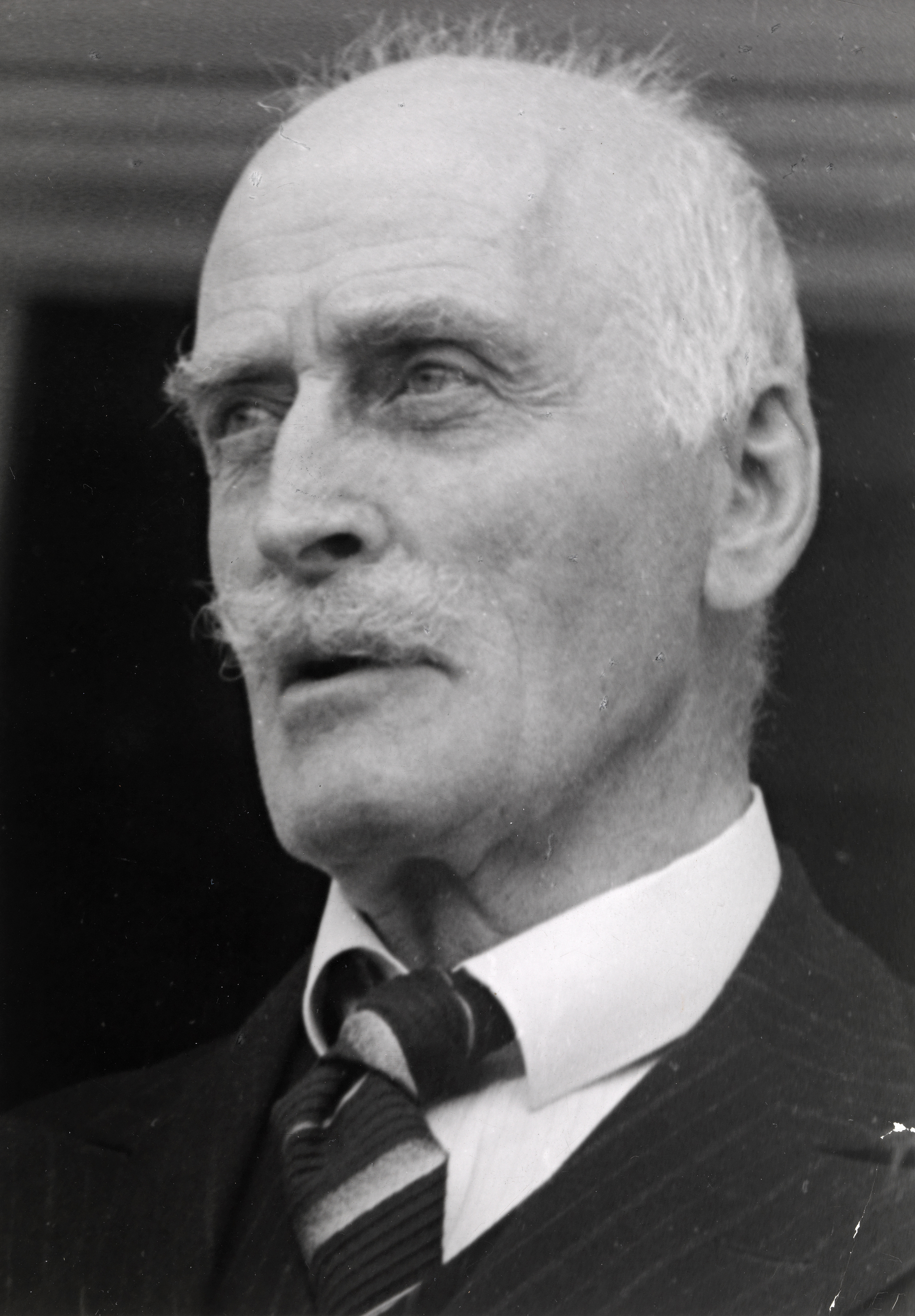
- Hamsun in 1939
- Born: Knud Pedersen; 4 August 1859; Lom, Gudbrandsdalen, United Kingdoms of Sweden and Norway (present-day Lom, Norway)
- Died: 19 February 1952 (aged 92); Grimstad, Norway
- Occupations: Writer; poet; social critic
- Spouses: Bergljot Bech (m. 1898; div. 1906) Marie Andersen (m. 1909)
- Children: 5, including Tore Hamsun
- Writing career
- Language: Norwegian
- Period: 1877–1949
- Genres: Novel; short story; play; poetry; travelogue; non-fiction
- Notable awards: Nobel Prize in Literature (1920)
- Movements: Neo-romanticism; Neo-realism; Modernism

Signature
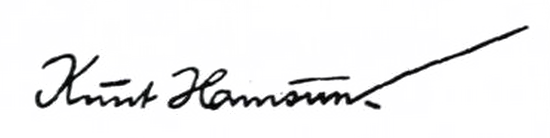

Knut Hamsun (/ˈhɑːmsʊn/; Norwegian: [ˈhɑmsʉn]; 4 August 1859 – 19 February 1952) was a Norwegian writer who was awarded the 1920 Nobel Prize in Literature for his novel Growth of the Soil. Hamsun's work spans more than 70 years and shows variation with regard to consciousness, subject, perspective and environment. He published more than 23 novels, a collection of poetry, some short stories and plays, a travelogue, works of non-fiction and some essays.

Hamsun is considered "one of the most influential and innovative literary stylists of the past hundred years" (c. 1890–1990). He pioneered psychological literature with techniques of stream of consciousness and interior monologue, and influenced authors such as Thomas Mann, Franz Kafka, Maxim Gorky, Stefan Zweig, Henry Miller, Hermann Hesse, John Fante, James Kelman, Charles Bukowski and Ernest Hemingway. Isaac Bashevis Singer called Hamsun "the father of the modern school of literature in his every aspect—his subjectiveness, his fragmentariness, his use of flashbacks, his lyricism. The whole modern school of fiction in the twentieth century stems from Hamsun". Since 1916, several of Hamsun's works have been adapted into motion pictures. On 4 August 2009, the Knut Hamsun Centre was opened in Hamarøy Municipality.

The young Hamsun objected to realism and naturalism. He argued that the main object of modernist literature should be the intricacies of the human mind, that writers should describe the "whisper of blood, and the pleading of bone marrow". Hamsun is considered the "leader of the Neo-Romantic revolt at the turn of the 20th century", with works such as Hunger (1890), Mysteries (1892), Pan (1894), and Victoria (1898). His later works—in particular his "Nordland novels"—were influenced by the Norwegian new realism, portraying everyday life in rural Norway and often employing local dialect, irony, and humour. Hamsun published only one poetry collection, The Wild Choir, which has been set to music by several composers.

Hamsun held strong Anglophobic views, and openly supported Adolf Hitler and Nazi Germany: he donated his Nobel Prize medal to Joseph Goebbels, propaganda Minister for the Third Reich and met Hitler during the German occupation of Norway. Due to his professed support for the occupation of Norway and the Quisling regime, he was charged with treason after the war. Due to alleged psychological problems and issues relating to old age, he was not convicted, but in 1948 he was heavily fined. Hamsun's last book, On Overgrown Paths, authored in semi-imprisonment in Landvik, concerned his postwar treatment and his rebuttal to accusations of mental ineptness.

== Biography ==
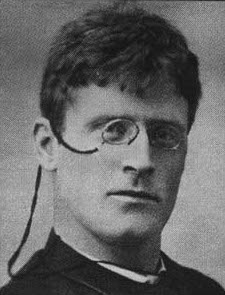
Hamsun in 1890, the year he published his first major work, Hunger

=== Early life ===
Knut Hamsun was born as Knud Pedersen in 1859 in Lom Municipality in the Gudbrandsdalen valley, Norway. He was the fourth son among the seven children of Tora Olsdatter and Peder Pedersen. When he was three, the family moved to Hamsund in Hamarøy Municipality in Nordland county. They were poor and an uncle had invited them to farm his land for him.

At nine Knut was separated from his family and lived with his uncle Hans Olsen, who needed help with the post office he ran. Olsen used to beat and starve his nephew, and Hamsun later stated that his chronic nervous difficulties were due to how his uncle treated him.

In 1874 he finally escaped back to Lom. For the next five years he did any job for money: shop assistant, peddler, shoemaker's apprentice, sheriff's assistant, and an elementary-school teacher.

At 17 he became a ropemaker's apprentice. At about the same time he started to write. He asked businessman Erasmus Zahl to give him monetary support, and he agreed. Hamsun later used Zahl as a model for the character Mack appearing in his novels Pan (1894), Dreamers (1904), Benoni (1908) and Rosa (1908).

He spent several years in America, traveling and working at various jobs, and published in 1889 his impressions under the title Fra det moderne Amerikas Aandsliv ("From the Spiritual Life of Modern America").

=== Married life ===
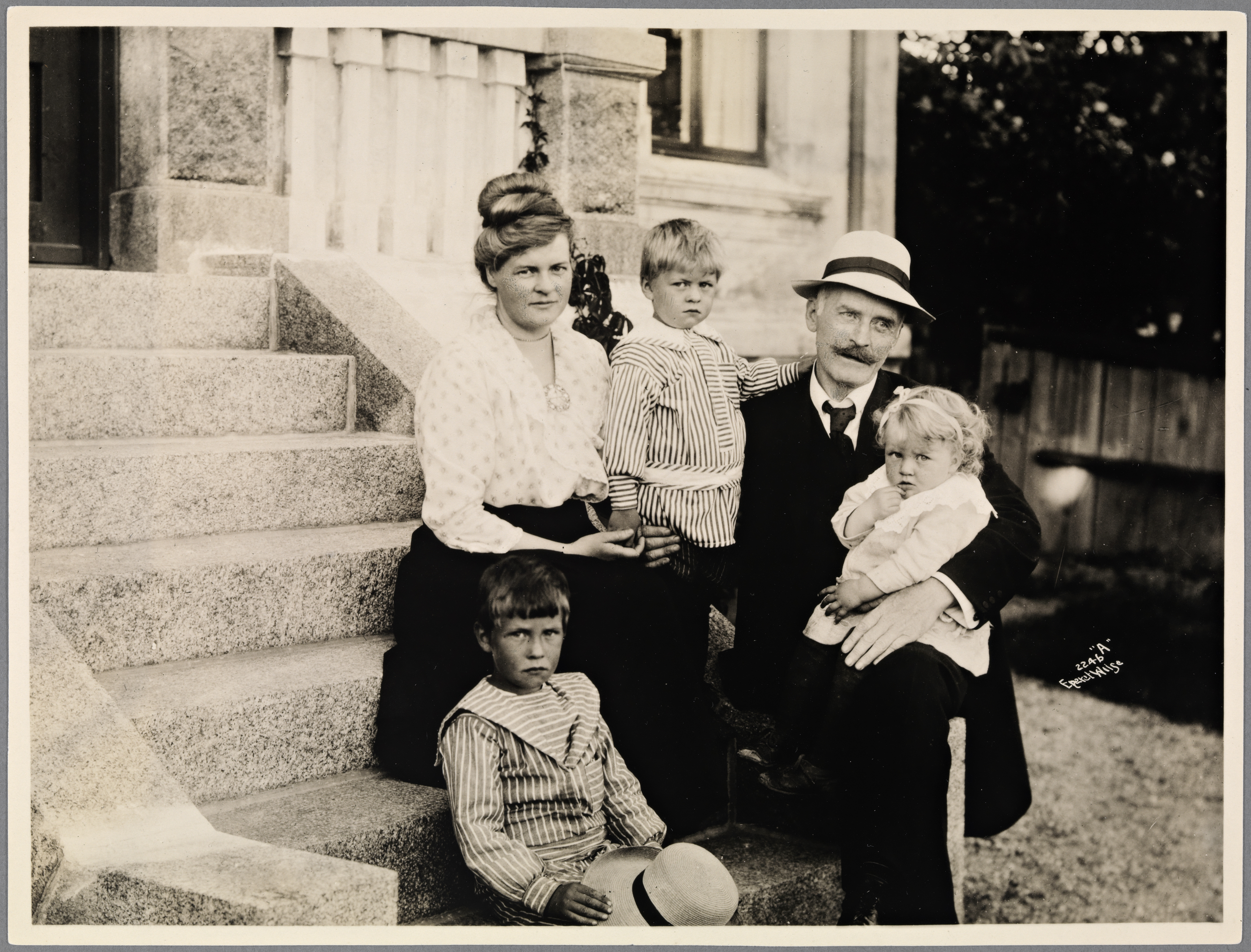
Family portrait on the stairs of "Villa Havgløtt"; left to right: Tore Hamsun, Marie Hamsun, Arild Hamsun, Knut Hamsun and Ellinor Hamsun.

In 1898, Hamsun married Bergljot Bech (later Göpfert), who bore daughter Victoria, but the marriage ended in 1906. Hamsun then married Marie Andersen (1881–1969) in 1909 and she was his companion until the end of his life. They had four children: sons Tore and Arild and daughters Ellinor and Cecilia.

Marie wrote about her life with Hamsun in two memoirs. She was a promising actress when she met Hamsun but ended her career and traveled with him to Hamarøy. They bought a farm, planning "to earn their living as farmers, with his writing providing some additional income".

After a few years they moved south, to Larvik. In 1918 they bought Nørholm, an old, somewhat dilapidated manor house in Landvik Municipality, between Lillesand and Grimstad. The main residence was restored and redecorated. Here Hamsun could occupy himself with writing undisturbed, although he often travelled to write in other cities and places, preferring spartan housing.

=== Early literary career ===
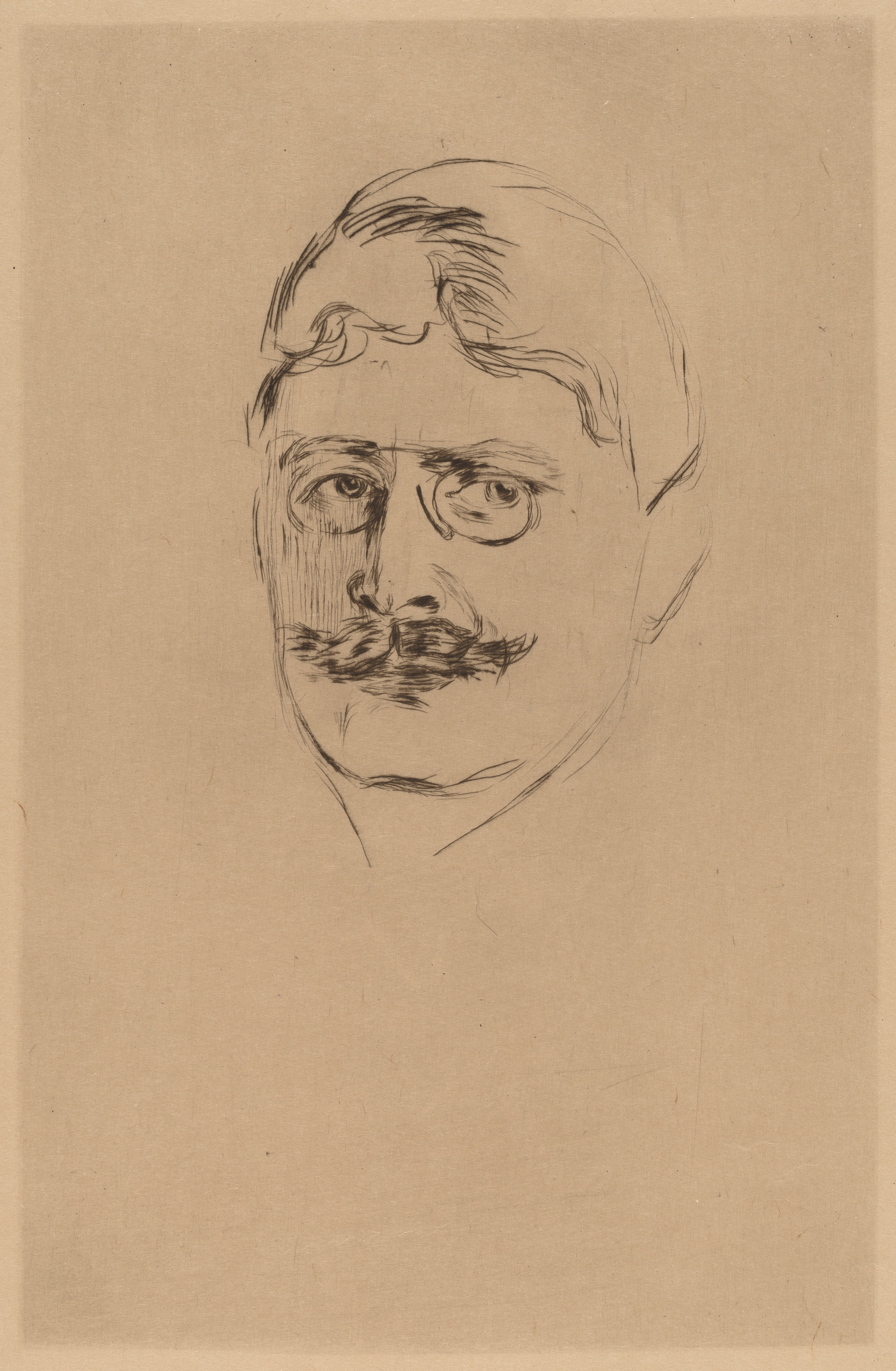
After Edvard Munch, Knut Hamsun, 1896, photogravure, National Gallery of Art, Washington, Rosenwald Collection, 1951.10.360

In 1877, he published his first book: Den Gaadefulde: En Kjærlighedshistorie fra Nordland (The Enigmatic Man: A Love Story from Northern Norway). It was inspired by his odd job experiences and struggles. In his second novel Bjørger (1878), he attempted to imitate Bjørnstjerne Bjørnson's writing style. The melodramatic story follows a poet, Bjørger, and his love for Laura. This book was published under the pseudonym Knud Pedersen Hamsund. This book served as the basis for Hamsun's later novel Victoria: En Kærligheds Historie (1898; translated as Victoria: A Love Story, 1923).

As of 1898 Hamsun was among the contributors of Ringeren, a political and cultural magazine established by Sigurd Ibsen.

=== Major works ===
Hamsun first received wide acclaim with his 1890 novel Hunger (Sult). The semiautobiographical work described a young writer's descent into near madness as a result of hunger and poverty in the Norwegian capital of Kristiania (modern name Oslo). To many, the novel presages the writings of Franz Kafka and other twentieth-century novelists with its internal monologue and bizarre logic.

A theme to which Hamsun often returned is that of the perpetual wanderer, an itinerant stranger (often the narrator) who insinuates himself into the life of small rural communities. This theme is central to the novels Mysteries, Pan, Under the Autumn Star, The Last Joy, Vagabonds, Rosa, and others.

Hamsun's prose often contains rapturous depictions of the natural world, with intimate reflections on the Norwegian woodlands and coastline. For this reason, he has been linked with the spiritual movement known as pantheism ("No one knows God," he once wrote, "man knows only gods."). Hamsun saw mankind and nature united in a strong, sometimes mystical bond. This connection between the characters and their natural environment is exemplified in the novels Pan, A Wanderer Plays on Muted Strings, and Growth of the Soil, "his monumental work" credited with securing him the Nobel Prize in Literature in 1920.

=== World War II, arrest and trial ===
As early as 1918 during World War I, Hamsun's pro-German attitude had been noted and The Atlantic speculated that the cause was "a love of opposition to average opinion." During World War II, Hamsun supported the German war effort. He courted and met with high-ranking Nazi officers, including Adolf Hitler. Nazi Minister of Propaganda Joseph Goebbels wrote a long and enthusiastic diary entry concerning a private meeting with Hamsun; according to Goebbels, Hamsun's "faith in German victory is unshakable". In 1940 Hamsun wrote that "the Germans are fighting for us".

On 13 June 1945, after the war, he was detained by police for treason, then committed to a hospital in Grimstad (Grimstad sykehus) "due to his advanced age", according to Einar Kringlen, a professor and medical doctor. In 1947 he was tried in Grimstad and fined. Norway's supreme court reduced the fine from 575,000 to 325,000 Norwegian kroner.

After the war, Norwegians were torn between aversion to Hamsun's Nazi sympathies and regard for his achievements and fame as a writer. At his trial Hamsun had pleaded ignorance. Other explanations have cited his contradictory personality, his distaste for hoi polloi, his inferiority complex, his distress at the spread of indiscipline, his dislike of Norway's interwar democracy, and especially his Anglophobia.

=== Death ===
Knut Hamsun died on 19 February 1952, aged 92, in Grimstad. His ashes are buried in the garden of his home at Nørholm in Landvik Municipality (now part of Grimstad Municipality).

== Style and themes ==
Scholar and translator Sverre Lyngstad explains that Hamsun had asserted in an 1890 article that for literature to accurately represent mental life, writers must explore:

"the mimosa-like sensitivities of the psyche and the secret stirrings in the remote parts of the mind, the incalculable welter of emotions, the random wanderings of thought and feeling, the uncharted, trackless journeys of heart and brain, the mysterious activities of the nerves, the whisper of the blood, the entreaty of the bones, all the unconscious life of the mind."

— Knut Hamsun in 1890

At the time of composing Mysteries (1892), Hamsun in essays and lectures was criticizing the state of Norwegian literature and promoting a new form of unpredictable psychological writing. Some of Hamsun's critical views received hostile reactions at the time, and he continued his political and cultural stance in dialog of the fictional character Nagel (who for example calls Ibsen's plays “dramatized wood pulp”), and used the book itself as an embodiment of his theory of literature. Hamsun had specifically criticized stereotypes of elder authors and called for characters of "changeable and divided mind" in whom "inconsistency is their fundamental trait."

Along with August Strindberg, Henrik Ibsen, and Sigrid Undset, Hamsun formed a quartet of Scandinavian authors who became internationally known for their works. Hamsun pioneered psychological literature with techniques of stream of consciousness and interior monologue, as found in material by, for example, Joyce, Proust, Mansfield and Woolf. His writing also had a major influence on Franz Kafka. Hamsun's works were translated into German by Cläre Mjøen.

Walter Benjamin wrote in 1929, "it is well known that the Germanic languages are particularly rich in heroes who are windbags, wastrels, and thieves, and who in general have gone to the dogs. Knut Hamsun, a master of such characters, has recently been discovered and celebrated."

== Reception ==
Thomas Mann described Hamsun as a "descendant of Fyodor Dostoyevsky and Friedrich Nietzsche." Arthur Koestler was a fan of his love stories. H.G. Wells praised Growth of the Soil, for which Hamsun was awarded the Nobel Prize in Literature. Isaac Bashevis Singer was a fan of Hamsun's modern subjectivism, flashbacks, fragmentation, and lyricism. A character in Charles Bukowski's book Women referred to Hamsun as the greatest writer who ever lived.

Hamsun's works remain popular. In 2009, a Norwegian biographer stated, "We can't help loving him, though we have hated him all these years.... That's our Hamsun trauma. He's a ghost that won't stay in the grave."

Scholar Reinhard Friederich stated that Hamsun's late-life political attitudes caused discussion of his earlier literary reputation and influence to become reduced to shallow half-hearted mention.

== Legacy ==
A fifteen-volume edition of Hamsun's complete works was published in 1954. In 2009, to mark the 150th anniversary of his birth, a new 27-volume edition of his complete works was published, including short stories, poetry, plays, and articles not included in the 1954 edition. For this new edition, all of Hamsun's works underwent slight linguistic modifications to make them more accessible to contemporary Norwegian readers. New English translations of two of his major works, Growth of the Soil and Pan, were published in 1998.

Three of Hamsun's homes (Hamsund gård in Hamarøy Municipality, Hamsunstugu in Garmo in Lom Municipality, and Nørholm in Grimstad Municipality) are open to the public as museums, as is the Knut Hamsun Centre in Hamarøy.

=== Studies on Hamsun's writings ===
Hamsun's writings have been the subject of numerous books and journal articles. Some of these writings compare and contrast Hamsun's literary works with the political and cultural ideas expressed in his non-fiction.

Hamsun produced a voluminous correspondence during his lifetime. Norwegian scholar and Hamsun expert Harald Næss spent four decades tracking these letters down in both the United States and Europe, producing a collection of thousands of letters. He published a selection in various volumes between 1994 and 2000.

== Racism and admiration for Hitler ==
From his youth onward, Hamsun espoused racist and anti-egalitarian beliefs. In The Cultural Life of Modern America (Fra det moderne Amerikas Aandsliv, 1889), he denounced miscegenation: "The Negros are and will remain Negros, a nascent human form the tropics, rudimentary organs on the body of white society. Instead of founding an intellectual elite, America has established a mulatto studfarm." Hamsun also wrote:

"[...] the nation’s blood was democratically mixed with that of the Negro, and intelligence sank rather than rose. Cohabitation with the blacks was foisted upon the people. Inhumanity stole them away from Africa where they belong, and democracy transformed them into civilized citizens against the entire order of nature. They have leaped over all the intermediate stages between voracious rat eater and Yankee. Now they are used as preachers, barbers, waiters, and sons-in-law."

— Knut Hamsun's racist statements in The Cultural Life of Modern America (1889)

Hamsun wrote several newspaper articles during World War II in support of Germany, including a notorious 1940 assertion that "the Germans are fighting for us, and now are crushing England's tyranny over us and all neutrals". In 1943, he sent Germany's minister of propaganda Joseph Goebbels his Nobel Prize medal as a gift. Its whereabouts since then are unknown. Hamsun's biographer Thorkild Hansen interpreted this as part of a strategy to get an audience with Hitler. Hamsun was eventually invited to meet with Hitler; during the meeting, Hamsun complained about the German civilian administrator in Norway, Josef Terboven and asked that imprisoned Norwegian citizens be released, enraging Hitler. Otto Dietrich describes the meeting in his memoirs as the only time that another person was able to get a word in edgeways with Hitler. He attributes this to Hamsun's deafness. Regardless, Dietrich notes that it took Hitler three days to get over his anger. Hamsun also on other occasions helped Norwegians who had been imprisoned for resistance activities and tried to influence German policies in Norway. After a visit to Nazi Germany, a radio interviewer asked Hamsun if he met Hitler, and Hamsun replied "You know, I met so many people, I can't really remember." The reply prompted a debate in the Times Literary Supplement between scholars about the meaning.

A week after Hitler's death, Hamsun wrote a eulogy for him, saying "He was a warrior, a warrior for mankind, and a prophet of the gospel of justice for all nations." Following the end of the war, angry crowds burned his books in public in major Norwegian cities and Hamsun was confined for several months in a psychiatric hospital.

Hamsun was forced to undergo a psychiatric examination, which concluded that he had "permanently impaired mental faculties," and on that basis the charges of treason were dropped. A civil liability case was raised against him, and in 1948 he had to pay the ruinous sum of 325,000 kroner ($65,000 or £16,250 at that time) to the Norwegian government. Specifically, he was held responsible for a willingness to be "taken for" a member of Nasjonal Samling (NS), and for the (questionable) presence of his name on a registration form, but acquitted of other charges, while the court decided there was not enough evidence to demonstrate he was a member.. Hamsun denied that he was a member of NS or any political party, though he admitted to having been "Quisling's man" for years.

He wrote his last book Paa giengrodde Stier (On Overgrown Paths) in 1949. A publisher Harald Grieg, thought the book demonstrated that Hamsun's faculties were not impaired. In it, Hamsun harshly criticizes the psychiatrists and the judges and, in his view, proves that he is not mentally ill.

Danish author Thorkild Hansen investigated the trial and wrote The Hamsun Trial (1978), which created a storm in Norway. Hansen viewed Hamsun's treatment as outrageous, writing, "If you want to meet idiots, go to Norway." In 1996, Swedish filmmaker Jan Troell based the movie Hamsun on Hansen's book. In Hamsun, Swedish actor Max von Sydow plays Knut Hamsun; his wife Marie is played by Danish actress Ghita Nørby.

== Film and TV adaptations ==
A biopic, Hamsun, was released in 1996, directed by Jan Troell. It stars Max von Sydow as Hamsun.

Hamsun's works have been the basis of 25 films and television mini-series adaptations, starting in 1916.

- 1922 - Pan was the basis of a 1922 film, and three more adaptations later.
- 1966 film Hunger,starring Per Oscarsson, directed by Henning Carlsen. A Danish, Norwegian and Swedish coproduction. It is considered one of the best film adaptations of a Hamsun work.
- 1978 - Mysteries by the Dutch film company Sigma Pictures), directed by Paul de Lussanet, starring Sylvia Kristel, Rutger Hauer, Andrea Ferreol and Rita Tushingham. Based on Mysteries
- 1990 - Landstrykere (Wayfarers), a Norwegian film directed by Ola Solum.
- 1993 - The Telegraphist, a Norwegian film directed by Erik Gustavson, based on the novel Dreamers (Sværmere, also published in English as Mothwise).
- 1995 - film of the same name, a Danish production directed by Henning Carlsen

Remodernist filmmaker Jesse Richards has announced he is in preparations to direct an adaptation of Hamsun's short story The Call of Life.

== Works ==
=== Novels ===
- 1890 Sult (Hunger)
- 1892 Mysterier (Mysteries)
- 1893 Redaktør Lynge (Editor Lynge)
- 1893 Ny Jord (Shallow Soil)
- 1894 Pan (Pan)
- 1898 Victoria. En kjærlighedshistorie (Victoria)
- 1904 Sværmere (Mothwise, 1921), (Dreamers)
- 1905 Stridende Liv. Skildringer fra Vesten og Østen (Fighting Life. Depictions from the West and the East)
- 1917 Markens Grøde 2 Volumes (Growth of the Soil)
- 1920 Konerne ved Vandposten 2 Volumes (The Women at the Pump)
- 1923 Siste Kapitel (2 Volumes) (Chapter the Last)
- 1936 Ringen sluttet (The Ring is Closed)

=== Series ===
The Wanderer Trilogy

1. 1906 Under Høststjærnen. En Vandrers Fortælling (Under the Autumn Star)
2. 1909 En Vandrer spiller med Sordin (A Wanderer Plays on Muted Strings)
3. 1912 Den sidste Glæde (Look Back on Happiness, AKA The Last Joy)

Benoni and Rosa

1. 1908 Benoni
2. 1908 Rosa: Af Student Parelius' Papirer (By Student Parelius' Papers) (Rosa)

Children of the Age and Segelfoss Town

1. 1913 Børn av Tiden (Children of the Age)
2. 1915 Segelfoss By 1 (2 Volumes) (Segelfoss Town)

The August Trilogy

1. 1927 Landstrykere (Wayfarers) (2 Volumes)
2. 1930 August (2 Volumes)
3. 1933 Men Livet lever (The Road Leads On) (2 Volumes)

=== Plays ===
- 1895 Ved Rigets Port (At the Gate of the Kingdom)
- 1896 Livets Spil (The Game of Life)
- 1898 Aftenrøde. Slutningspil (Evening Red: Inference Games)
- 1902 Munken Vendt. Brigantine's Saga I
- 1903 Dronning Tamara (Queen Tamara)
- 1910 Livet i Vold (In the Grip of Life)

=== Short story collections ===
- 1897 Siesta
- 1903 Kratskog

=== Stories ===
- 1877 "Den Gaadefulde. En kjærlighedshistorie fra Nordland".(The Gracious. A love story from Nordland) (Published as Knud Pedersen)
- 1878 "Bjørger" (Published as Knud Pedersen Hamsund)

=== Poetry ===
- 1878 Et Gjensyn (A Reunion) - epic poem (Published as Knud Pedersen Hamsund)
- 1904 Det vilde Kor, (The Wild Choir)

=== Non-fiction ===
- 1889 Lars Oftedal. Udkast (Draft) (11 articles, previously printed in Dagbladet)
- 1889 Fra det moderne Amerikas Aandsliv (The Cultural Life of Modern America) - lectures and criticism
- 1903 I Æventyrland. Oplevet og drømt i Kaukasien (In Wonderland) - travelogue
- 1918 Sproget i Fare (The Language in Danger) - essays
- 1949 Paa gjengrodde Stier (On Overgrown Paths)

=== In translation ===
Nobel Prize-winning writer Isaac Bashevis Singer translated some of his works into Yiddish.
