= Growth of the Soil (disambiguation) =

Growth of the Soil is a 1920 novel by Knut Hamsun.

Growth of the Soil may also refer to:

- Growth of the Soil (1921 film), a film by Gunnar Sommerfeldt based on the novel
- Growth of the Soil (2026 film), an upcoming film directed by Hans Petter Moland based on the novel
