= Growth of the Soil =

Novel by Knut Hamsun

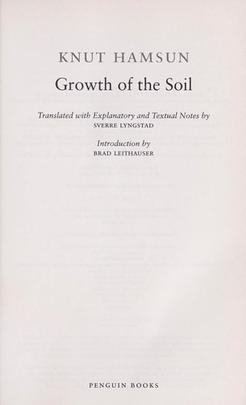
- Author: Knut Hamsun
- Original title: Markens Grøde
- Genre: Fiction
- Set in: Norway
- Publication date: 1917
- Publication place: Norway
- Awards: Nobel Prize for Literature
- ISBN: 9780143105107 (multiple exist)
- OCLC: 1835845
- Dewey Decimal: 839.8/2/3/6

Growth of the Soil (Norwegian: Markens Grøde) is a novel by Knut Hamsun which won him the Nobel Prize in Literature in 1920. It follows the story of a man who settles and lives in rural Norway. First published in 1917, it has since been translated from Norwegian into many languages including English. The novel was written in the popular style of Norwegian new realism, a movement dominating the early 20th century. The novel exemplified Hamsun's aversion to modernity and inclination towards primitivism and the agrarian lifestyle. The novel employed literary techniques new to the time such as stream of consciousness. Hamsun tended to stress the relationship between his characters and the natural environment. Growth of the Soil portrays the protagonist (Isak) and his family as awed by modernity, yet at times, they come into conflict with it. The novel contains two sections titled Book One and Book Two. The first book focuses almost solely on the story of Isak and his family and the second book starts off by following the plight of Axel and ends mainly focusing on Isak's family.

== Plot ==
=== Book One ===
The novel begins by following the story of Isak, a Norwegian man, who finally settled upon a patch of land which he deemed fit for farming. He began creating earthen sheds in which he housed several goats obtained from the village yonder. Isak asked passing by Lapps, nomadic indigenous people, to tell women that he is in need of help on his farm. Eventually, a “big, brown-eyed girl, full-built and coarse” with a harelip (Note: The archaic term for a cleft lip) named Inger, arrived at the house and settled in. Inger had her first child which was a son named Eleseus. She then had another son named Sivert.

The Lensmand (Note: An official in charge of a certain jurisdiction) Geissler came by their farm one day informing them that they were on State land and assisted them in purchasing it. They named the farm Sellanraa. Soon after, Geissler was discharged from his position as Lensmand after a sharp reprimand from his superior and was subsequently replaced with Lensmand Heyerdahl. One day while Isak had left the farm to sell a bull in the village, Inger gave birth to a child and had killed it upon seeing that it had a harelip and would undergo the inevitable suffering in life she herself had experienced. One day, Oline, Inger's relative, visited the farm and figured out that Inger had killed a child. The news of the infanticide now spread. One October day, the Lensmand and a man showed up at their doorstep to investigate and find evidence pertaining to the crime. Oline had agreed to serve at the farm while Inger was serving her eight-year sentence in prison.

Geissler returned one day, interested in prospective copper mining grounds near Sellanraa. Apparently, Geissler did not come to the farm just for the ore, but he also intended on planning to have Inger released from prison as soon as possible.

Brede Olsen, the Lensmand's assistant, had now settled on the land halfway between Sellanraa and the village. The farm of his was named Breidablik. One day, people came out to mark the route for a telegraph line that was to run near Isak's farm. Meanwhile, Inger had given birth to another baby girl, Leopoldine, at the prison. The following day, Geissler returned to Sellanraa. He first addressed the matter of the copper tract. He purchased the land for 200 daler from Isak, money unheard of to him until this day. Geissler also spoke of Inger and how he submitted a report to the King and the Governor regarding the case asking for her release. Inger was to be released early. Isak was stupefied by the generosity of Geissler.

Isak drove down to the village to meet Inger. Great changes had occurred while Inger was away. No longer had she the harelip but merely a scar on her face. And now she was with the daughter Isak had not yet met, Leopoldine. When one of the telegraph engineers stopped at Isak's house, a job was offered to Eleseus to work under his care in the village. Eleseus went to work in town.

A new settler arrived in between Sellanraa and Breidablik, his name was Axel Ström. He named his farm Maaneland. Axel Ström was offered by Brede to have his daughter Barbro assist him at his place.

Inger once again gave birth to a daughter named Rebecca. When Oline arrived one day, she told the family that Uncle Sivert, the one who Sivert was named after, had fallen terribly ill. It was agreed upon that Sivert was to inherit the big fortune which his uncle was to leave behind. Eventually, Uncle Sivert died and later, the fortune was to be determined.

Geissler and a few prospective mining buyers arrived at the farm by horse one day. Geissler acted as Isak's advocate and sold the section of Isak's land for four thousand Kroner. Isak marvels at how much Geissler has assisted him in making money.

News arrived that Breidablik was going to be sold. The real reason Brede was selling his place was because there were some money issues associated with the banks and stores at the village, but they made it seem as though he was selling the place on his own freewill in order to avoid disgrace.

The last part of Book One tells of Isak obtaining another wonder for his farm, this time, a mowing machine. He attempts to assemble it but fails and requires Eleseus’ reading skills to help him fix it. People from all over assemble to witness this luxury in use.

=== Book Two ===
After the officials went through the financial books, it was discovered to the shock of the family that Uncle Sivert had nothing left of his fortune.

Isak went to the auction of Breidablik. Axel, to the surprise of everyone, had purchased the farm. When asked, he said that he was buying it on someone else's behalf. Meanwhile, Eleseus had left the farm and headed back to town for a job which was no longer available for him.

On the third of September, Axel could not find Barbro anywhere. He searched around and eventually finds her on the banks of a stream. He wonders what has happened to the child Barbro was pregnant with. According to her, she had been near the stream collecting juniper twigs for cleaning buckets when suddenly, she slipped into the river at the same time she was to give birth. It was too late as the baby had already succumbed to drowning. Axel went to look for the infant and found it under a heap of moss and twigs wrapped in a cloth. He ran home for a shovel to bury the body properly. Axel and Barbro argued as she continued to claim that the baby drowned when she accidentally slipped into the water. Barbro, in the heat of the argument, confessed that she had once killed another baby and threw it off a boat. That winter, Barbro went to the village to visit the dentist. Axel had no faith in her returning, and, indeed, she went to Bergen, another large city, to stay.

One day, Axel was going out into the forest to fell some trees when he saw Brede going up the hill, most likely on an errand to fix something relating to the telegraph line. Axel started chopping down a tree when suddenly, his foot slipped into a cleft in a stone and the tree came crashing down on him. There was a blizzard that day and night was setting in. Axel struggled for hours trying to free himself, but was not able to reach for the axe lying on the ground to cut his way out. Axel yelled to Brede, hoping that he would be returning from his errand soon. Surely enough, after a few hours, Brede came by, but simply ignored him pretending that he was unaware of the situation. He walked on and left Axel to die. When all hope was lost, Oline found Axel. She freed him and helped him return home. On their way back, they encountered Brede, who claimed that when he encountered Axel on the ground, he showed no signs of needing help or that anything was wrong.

The next day, the news reported that there was a new settler arriving below Maaneland. He was apparently very rich and was going to open a store at the location. His name was Aronson, and he called his place Storborg. Spring arrived and engineers and workmen from Sweden began work on the mine. Storborg was prospering with all of these workers buying things at his trading post. The work on the mine continued but there was news that the yield of ore was not as good as promised. As expected, the commotion at the mine started to subside and workers were being dismissed. Now that the mine had been deemed fruitless, the engineer wanted to purchase the land south of the water owned by Geissler. Geissler anticipated that this would happen, and so he offered the land at an exorbitant price showing that he had nothing to lose if they did not want to buy it.

Eventually, the ordeal with Barbro was discovered, and she was arrested in Bergen, the city where she was staying. Now the time had come for Barbro and Axel's trial to take place. Amazingly, the Lensmand's wife, Mrs. Heyerdahl, had stepped up for Barbro by giving a great, eloquent speech that moved everyone. The jury was obviously affected by this speech, and Barbro and Axel were found innocent. Mrs. Heyerdahl then got Barbro to come work for her.

Meanwhile, Aronsen was furious that Geissler was refusing to sell his tract of land to the mining company. His trading business depended on a lot of foot traffic, but since there was no more of it, there were no more customers. Geissler was taking revenge on the village for removing him as Lensmand. The entire fate and economy of the district hinged on whether he would sell the land. Eventually, Aronsen, not able to handle it anymore, sold his place to Eleseus, who decided that he would become a farmer. Geissler had finally sold his land, and the mine became operational again. Later, Aronsen returned, trying to buy back the farm from Eleseus, but to no avail.

Barbro was evicted from Mrs. Heyerdahl's house after an argument in which Mrs. Heyerdahl discovered that Barbro was often sneaking out to celebrations when she was supposed to be working. Mrs. Heyerdahl was outraged that this was what she got after saving Barbro from the clutches of the law. Barbro daringly returned to Axel, but, unfortunately, Oline had taken her place in the household while she was away. Oline really did not want to leave the place and asked Axel to call for the doctor, as she was not feeling well one night. She criticized them for trying to evict such a poor, ill woman. Oline died that night.

When Eleseus returned home, he talked privately with Sivert, telling him of his big plans - he was going to start a new life in America. Sivert was shocked and advised his brother not to go, but seeing that this was futile, he gave him 25 kroner for his journey. Eleseus left that day on a boat and never came back. What was once barren land was now rich of settlers, all started by the one pioneer, Isak.

== Characters ==
=== Isak ===
Isak, the protagonist of the novel, is described as a "strong, coarse fellow, with a red iron beard, and little scars on face and hands". He is the first settler on the Almenning (Note: Not explicitly explained in the novel, the Almenning is presumed to be the large region where between Isak's farm and the village where many people were settling) near the village. He is the husband of Inger and father of Eleseus, Sivert, Leopoldine, and Rebecca. The character of Isak conforms to Hamsun's ideal individual: hard working, with a large family, and averted to modernity but rather finding roots with the agrarian lifestyle. Isak is often portrayed as very simple. He has no education and is unable to read well or write. Isak is a pioneer of the land, starting a farm and family from virtually nothing, a trait which Hamsun admired in individuals. There are several moments when Hamsun reveals Isak's crude and violent side, such as when he slams his wife Inger to the floor when he finds out she has been stealing from him. Isak is admired by many, his farm is very developed compared to his neighbors. He has many sheds, fancy tools that come as gifts from Geissler and a mining operator, good land, an advanced irrigation system, and more, which are a significant cause of this admiration.

=== Inger ===
Inger is Isak's wife. She is described as being "a big, brown-eyed girl, full built and coarse, with good, heavy hands, and rough hide brogues on her feet as if she had been a Lapp..." She also had a harelip. She is the mother of two boys, Eleseus and Sivert; two girls, Leopoldine and Rebecca; and a fifth child, whom she killed because it was born with a harelip. She wanted to spare the child the kind of suffering she knew this defect would bring. People soon realized that something had happened to her pregnancy, and the body of the child was discovered buried in the forest. Inger was sentenced to eight years in prison out of a maximum sentence of life. Prison was a positive experience for her. She learned how to knit, do various types of needlework, read, write, and other things. In addition, Inger's harelip was surgically repaired when she was in prison. Hamsun described Inger as being quite ugly, unrefined, and unintelligent. She is always amazed at everything Isak does. Whenever he purchases something at the village, Inger marvels at it. However, her time in prison and resulting introduction to modernity cause her to lose her fervor for Isak's abilities and their simple country life.

=== Isak's children ===
Isak had four children: Eleseus, Sivert, Leopoldine, and Rebecca. There was also one child that was killed just after birth by Inger. The eldest child is a boy named Eleseus. He represents the intellectual of the family. Eleseus was offered a job in the village by a man where he learned many academic skills which are foreign to the rest of his family. His parents frequently sent him money which he would spend frivolously thus angering them. Upon returning home for a vacation, his position at his former job was lost. While staying at the farm again, it is evident that Eleseus is weak compared to his brother and isn't a physical worker. After much consideration, Eleseus purchased Aronsens' home with Isak's money. He stayed for a while but, after realizing a general ineptitude for prospering off the land and being enticed by the grander things in life, set off to America, never to be seen again. Sivert, the second eldest son, is a strong, hard-working person. He is similar to his father in terms of strength. Sivert is named after his uncle who was supposed to leave his nephew most of his supposedly large fortune, which amounted to nothing at his death. Leopoldine is one of the daughters which Inger bore while she was serving her prison sentence for committing infanticide. Rebecca is the youngest daughter who was born afterwards.

=== Geissler ===
Geissler is the ex-Lensmand of the village. He was a great friend of Isak and helped him sell his land, release Inger from prison, and give advice on selling the mine. Geissler was replaced by Lensmand Heyerdahl after a sharp reprimand from his superior. Isak admired Geissler and was always excited when he came by. Geissler would often be doing big business with other people and travelling but, towards the end of the novel, he appears worn out and in ill health. As the plot progresses, Geissler becomes antagonistic, as his personal business begins negatively affecting the lives and businesses of the township.

=== Isak's neighbours ===
Isak's neighbours are Brede Olsen, Aronsen, Axel Strom and Barbro. The first neighbour to settle near Isak was Brede Olsen of the farm Breidablik. He was scatterbrained and unable to look after a farm properly. Evidence of neglect of Brede's tools were seen as Isak passed by his farm to go to the village. Brede's place was eventually sold because of outstanding charges with the banks in the villages. They allowed Brede to make it seem like he was selling Breidablik out of his own will to avoid unnecessary embarrassment. Breidablik was purchased by Axel Strom who bought it for his brother. Axel Strom was the owner of Maaneland. He was not as proficient at farming as Isak was but received help from Barbro, Brede's daughter, who went to work for him. Aronsen was another very rich settler who set up a store in order to make profit from the many miners who would be in the area working on the mine near Sellanraa (Isak's farm). His place was named Storborg. Seeing that there was no more business as they were leaving due to a failure of yield, Aronsen sold his place to Eleseus, Isak's son.

== Major themes ==
Hamsun's protagonists were often outcasts and vagabonds that opposed civilization, industrialization, and modernisation. These rootless individuals who distrusted organized society were a reflection of Hamsun himself. The novel “Growth of the Soil” expresses back-to-nature, old-school philosophies, and peasant life. His works set simple agrarian values against those of industrial society, showing a deep aversion to civilization proving that people's fulfillment lies with the soil. The novel showed Hamsun's favour of primitivism and aversion to modernity. He opposed naturalism and realism and wanted “modern literature to represent the complex intricacies of human mind”. Hamsun believed that the true nature of an individual could only be revealed through a subjective and irrational approach. Hamsun's political beliefs and ideologies were often expressed in his books, especially Growth of the Soil.

The character Isak conforms to Hamsun's vision of an ideal individual. He has little connection with industrialized society or modernity, and when he does, it usually is in a negative light. For example, when he was informed that he was needing to purchase the farms land from the State, Isak was confused as this had never crossed his mind. Luckily for him, the cost was mild thanks to Lensmand Geissler's generosity. Isak was a pioneer of the soil, he started with nothing and built a great farm out of it. The theme of hard work yielding results was evident throughout the book with Isak as an example.

== Style ==
The novel is written in the style of Norwegian new realism, a literary movement which was used in Hamsun's later novels. This style was common during the first half of the 20th century in Norwegian literature. Hamsun utilized techniques fairly new to the time such as stream of consciousness or interior monologue.

== Reception ==
Growth of the Soil is regarded as a historical classic. It has been acclaimed by many and won the Nobel Prize for Literature in 1920. Hamsun's support of the German occupation of Norway has drawn much controversy. Subsequently, many refuse to acknowledge his success as a writer. William Worster, in an afterword to his 1920 translation of Growth of the Soil, describes the novel as follows:

It is the life story of a man in the wilds, the genesis and gradual development of a homestead, the unit of humanity, in the unfilled, uncleared tracts that still remain in the Norwegian Highlands.

It is an epic of earth; the history of a microcosm. Its dominant note is one of patient strength and simplicity; the mainstay of its working is the tacit, stern, yet loving alliance between Nature and the Man who faces her himself, trusting to himself and her for the physical means of life, and the spiritual contentment with life which she must grant if he be worthy.

Modern man faces Nature only by proxy, or as proxy, through others or for others, and the intimacy is lost. In the wilds the contact is direct and immediate; it is the foothold upon earth, the touch of the soil itself, that gives strength.

The story is epic in its magnitude, in its calm, steady progress and unhurrying rhythm, in its vast and intimate humanity. The author looks upon his characters with a great, all-tolerant sympathy, aloof yet kindly, as a god. A more objective work of fiction it would be hard to find—certainly in what used to be called "the neurasthenic North."

== Film adaptation ==
Growth of the Soil is a 1921 Norwegian silent film based on Hamsun's Growth of the Soil by the Norrøna Film company with an orchestral accompaniment composed by Leif Halvorsen. It was directed by Gunnar Sommerfeldt who also wrote the script and played the role of Lensmand Geissler. The original film was 107 minutes long and cost about 240,000 kroner to make, a very considerable sum of money at the time. It was filmed in Rana Municipality, Norway. The film cast stars Amund Rydland as Isak, Karen Poulsen as Inger, and Ragna Wettergreen as Oline (Inger's relative). The chief photographer was George Schnéevoigt.

Hans Petter Moland adapted the novel into a feature film, starring Herbert Nordrum and Asta Kamma August. The film will have its world premiere at the 2026 Toronto International Film Festival.

== Nobel Prize ==
Knut Hamsun was awarded the 1920 Nobel Prize in Literature "for his monumental work, Growth of the Soil". This is Hamsun's speech at the Nobel Banquet at Grand Hôtel, Stockholm, December 10, 1920 (translated to English):

What am I to do in the presence of such gracious, such overwhelming generosity? I no longer have my feet planted on the ground, I am walking on air, my head is spinning. It is not easy to be myself right now. I have had honours and riches heaped on me this day. I myself am what I am, but I have been swept off my feet by the tribute that has been paid to my country, by the strains of her national anthem which resounded in this hall a minute ago.

It is as well perhaps that this is not the first time I have been swept off my feet. In the days of my blessed youth there were such occasions; in what young person's life do they not occur? No, the only young people to whom this feeling is strange are those young conservatives who were born old, who do not know the meaning of being carried away. No worse fate can befall a young man or woman than becoming prematurely entrenched in prudence and negation. Heaven knows that there are plenty of opportunities in later life, too, for being carried away. What of it? We remain what we are and, no doubt, it is all very good for us!

However, I must not indulge in homespun wisdom here before so distinguished an assembly, especially as I am to be followed by a representative of science. I will soon sit down again, but this is my great day. I have been singled out by your benevolence, chosen amongst thousands of others, and crowned with laurels! On behalf of my country I thank the Swedish Academy and all Sweden for the honour they have bestowed on me. Personally, I bow my head under the weight of such great distinctions, but I am also proud that your Academy should have judged my shoulders strong enough to bear them.

A distinguished speaker said earlier tonight that I have my own way of writing, and this much I may perhaps claim and no more. I have, however, learned something from everyone and what man is there who has not learned a little from all? I have had much to learn from Sweden's poetry and, more especially, from her lyrics of the last generation. Were I more conversant with literature and its great names, I could go on quoting them ad infinitum and acknowledge my debt for the merit you have been generous enough to find in my work. However, coming from a person like me, this would be mere name-dropping, shallow sound effects without a single bass note to support them. I am no longer young enough for this; I have not the strength.

No, what I should really like to do right now, in the full blaze of lights, before this illustrious assembly, is to shower every one of you with gifts, with flowers, with offerings of poetry - to be young once more, to ride on the crest of the wave. That is what I should wish to do on this great occasion, this last opportunity for me. I dare not do it, for I would not be able to escape ridicule. Today riches and honours have been lavished on me, but one gift has been lacking, the most important one of all, the only one that matters, the gift of youth. None of us is too old to remember it. It is proper that we who have grown old should take a step back and do so with dignity and grace.

I know not what I should do—I know not what is the right thing to do, but I raise my glass to the youth of Sweden, to young people everywhere, to all that is young in life.
