= Hjertetyven =

- Directed by: Lau Lauritzen Sr.
- Written by: Poul Gregaard
- Starring: Frederik Buch; Carl Schenstrøm; Gerhard Jessen; Erna Schøyen
- Cinematography: Hugo J. Fischer
- Distributed by: Nordisk Films Kompagni A/S
- Release date: 1919
- Running time: 21 minutes
- Country: Denmark
- Language: Danish

Hjertetyven (Thief of Hearts) is a Danish short silent comedy film from 1919 directed by Lau Lauritzen Sr. The screenplay was written by Poul Gregaard. The Norwegian actress Erna Schøyen plays the leading female role as Elva Marja.

The film was reviewed by the National Film Authority on November 11, 1916 and opened in Norwegian cinemas in 1917, but its Danish release did not occur until January 31, 1919.

== Plot ==
The dancer Elva Marja has a very faithful and enthusiastic admirer in Henry Corner, who is known for his wealth and eccentricity. Immediately after her performance, he writes in a letter that he has been following her from city to city for three months and hopes that she must have realized that she can no longer avoid him. Corner concludes that he will wait for Elva Marja in the vestibule. He asks a theater employee to give her the letter. Elva Marja is sitting in her changing room, surrounded by several men. She reads the letter to them, and they all laugh. Elva Marja asks the theater staff to tell "the conceited gentleman" that he should not waste his time waiting for answers. Corner is still waiting for her in the vestibule as announced. When Elva Marja passes him with her male companion, she makes a cutting remark.

Hjertetyven

The next evening, Corner has bought all the tickets to Elva Marja's performance and is the only spectator in the parquet. She refuses to dance for him because she thinks he has arranged everything just to annoy her. The director persuades Elva Marja to perform anyway, and she delivers a masterful performance before the lone spectator. After the show, Corner sends her a bouquet of flowers with a note. It says that he is waiting for her in the vestibule and that there are no words to express how much he is looking forward to spending the evening with her. Corner stands patiently and waits yet again. Elva Marja throws the bouquet at him as she walks past and travels home. After she returns home, her maid tells her that a messenger has delivered a magnificent bouquet of flowers. Like the first one, it is a gift from Corner.

The burglar Søren Svup is interested in the dancer's home. He climbs a ladder to the second floor. Elva Marja hears him and calls the police. The police officer replies that she lives so far away that it will take at least a quarter hour before they can reach her. Corner is outside her home and discovers the ladder.

== Cast ==
- Frederik Buch as Henry Corner
- Carl Schenstrøm
- Gerhard Jessen
- Erna Schøyen as Elva Marja
- Peter Jørgensen
