= Kærlighed og Mobilisering =

1915 film

- Directed by: Lau Lauritzen Sr.
- Written by: Alfred Kjerulf
- Cinematography: Hugo J. Fischer
- Distributed by: Nordisk Film
- Release date: 23 August 1915
- Country: Denmark
- Language: Silent

Kærlighed og Mobilisering (English: Put Me Amongst the Girls) is a 1915 Danish silent film directed by Lau Lauritzen Sr. The film stars Frederik Buch and Henny Lauritzen.

== Cast ==
- Frederik Buch - Fuldmægtig Bømler
- Henny Lauritzen - Enkefrue Siversen
- Helen Gammeltoft - Julie, enkefruens datter
- Gunnar Sommerfeldt - Hansen, Julies forlovede
- Ingeborg Bruhn Bertelsen
- Ingeborg Olsen
- Ebba Lorentzen
