= Ingeborg Spangsfeldt =

Danish actress

- Born: Christiane Ingeborg Margrete Olsen; 25 July 1895; Copenhagen, Denmark
- Died: 21 June 1968 (aged 72); Copenhagen, Denmark
- Other names: Ingeborg Olsen; I. Olsen
- Occupation: Actor
- Years active: 1912–1924
- Spouse: Dr. Tage Iversen
- Parent(s): Niels Hansen Olsen, Kirstine Marie Olsen

Ingeborg Spangsfeldt (born Christiane Ingeborg Margrete Olsen; 25 July 1895 – 21 June 1968) was a Danish film actress whose career began in the early 1910s until her retirement upon getting married in 1924.

== Early life ==
Ingeborg Spangsfeldt was born Christiane Ingeborg Margrete Olsen, the daughter of a merchant, Niels Hansen Olsen and his wife Kirstine Marie Olsen. She began her film career at Nordisk Film in 1912, and was often credited in her earliest performances as Ingeborg Olsen. Her earliest films were often small roles as maids or nurses. Her first film for Nordisk was a small role in the 1913 Holger-Madsen-directed Af elskovs nåde (English: By the Grace of Love), which starred Betty Nansen.

== Career ==
In 1916 and 1917, Spangsfeldt's career built momentum and she began receiving larger roles at Nordisk, appearing opposite such Danish leading men as Carl Lauritzen, Gunnar Sommerfeldt, Valdemar Psilander and Frederik Buch. In all, she appeared in nearly sixty films for Nordisk. At the peak of her career in the late 1910s and early 1920s, she achieved leading lady status and was a very popular film actress, but she chose to retire from film following her marriage to Dr. Tage Iversen on 3 March 1924. Her last film role was a starring role in the Carl Alstrup-directed Kokain-Rusen, filmed in 1924 and released in 1925.

== Selected filmography ==
- Praesten i Vejlby (English: The Vicar of Vjelby) - Mette (1922)
- Borgslægtens historie (English: Sons of the Soil) - Rúna (1919)
- Kærlighed og Mobilisering (credited as Ingeborg Olsen) (1915)
