= Københavnere =

1933 Danish film

- Poster
- Directed by: Lau Lauritzen Sr.
- Written by: Lau Lauritzen Jr. Alice O'Fredericks
- Produced by: Lau Lauritzen Sr.
- Starring: Christian Arhoff; Olga Svendsen; Ib Schønberg
- Cinematography: Carlo Bentsen
- Music by: Victor Cornelius
- Distributed by: Palladium Productions
- Release date: 30 December 1933
- Running time: 103 minutes
- Country: Denmark
- Language: Danish language

Københavnere is a 1933 Danish film directed by Lau Lauritzen Sr. and written by Lau Lauritzen Jr. and Alice O'Fredericks.

== Cast ==
- Christian Arhoff as Erik's stedfar
- Olga Svendsen as Olivia
- Agnes Rehni as Direktørfruen
- Aase Clausen as Danserinden
- Erling Schroeder as Erik
- Ib Schønberg
- Holger Strøm
- Per Knutzon
- Alex Suhr
- Anton De Verdier
- Randi Michelsen
- Ellen Jansø
- Ingeborg Pehrson
- Christian Schrøder
- Carl Schenstrøm
- Harald Madsen
- Mona Mårtenson
- Erling Schroeder
- Olga Svendsen
- Anton de Verdier
- Christian Schrøder
- Einar Juhl
- Alex Suhr
- Christen Møller
- Jørgen Lund
- Poul Reichhardt
- Asbjørn Andersen
- Henry Nielsen
- Aage Bendixen
- Bruno Tyron
- Gerda Neumann
- Else Nielsen
- Johannes Andresen
- Ejner Bjørkman
