= Circus Saran =

1935 film

- German film poster
- German: Zirkus Saran
- Directed by: E. W. Emo
- Written by: Hanns Leistenschneider; Hanns Sassmann
- Produced by: Oskar Glück
- Starring: Leo Slezak; Hans Moser; Georgia Holl
- Cinematography: Eduard Hoesch
- Music by: Robert Stolz
- Production company: Projektograph Film
- Distributed by: Kiba Kinobetriebsanstalt
- Release date: 4 December 1935
- Running time: 70 minutes
- Country: Austria
- Language: German

Circus Saran (German: Zirkus Saran) is a 1935 Austrian comedy film directed by E. W. Emo and starring Leo Slezak, Hans Moser, and Ole & Axel.

The film's sets were designed by the art director Julius von Borsody.

== Cast ==
- Leo Slezak as Direktor Saran
- Hans Moser as Knox, sein Kompagnon
- Georgia Holl as Lissi, dessen Tochter
- Carl Schenstrøm as Clown
- Harald Madsen as Clown
- Rolf Wanka as Kurt von Herdegen
- Adele Sandrock as Seine Großmutter
- Ilona Massey as Eine Sängerin
- Poldi Dur
- Auguste Pünkösdy
