= Højt paa en Kvist =

1929 film

Højt paa en kvist
- Directed by: Lau Lauritzen Sr.
- Written by: Lau Lauritzen Jr.
- Release date: 26 December 1929
- Country: Denmark
- Languages: Silent film; Danish intertitles

Højt paa en Kvist is a 1929 Danish silent family film directed by Lau Lauritzen Sr. and written by his son Lau Lauritzen Jr.

== Cast ==
- Carl Schenstrøm as Fyrtårnet
- Harald Madsen as Bivognen
- Victor Wulff
- Gerda Kofoed
- Marguerite Viby
- Nina Kalckar
- Bruno Tyron
- Emmy Schønfeld
- Mathilde Felumb-Friis
- Alex Suhr
- Christian Arhoff
- Emil Hass Christensen
