= Tove Wallenstrøm =

Danish actress (1915–2013)

Tove Wallenstrom
- Born: 12 January 1915
- Died: 5 March 2013 (aged 98)

Tove Agnes Christense Wallenstrøm (12 January 1915 in Copenhagen – 5 March 2013) was a Danish actress.

== Filmography ==
- Han, hun og Hamlet – 1932
- Københavnere – 1933
- 5 raske piger – 1933
- Provinsen kalder – 1935
- Prisoner Number One – 1935
- Frøken Vildkat – 1942
