= Oscar Stribolt =

Danish actor (1872–1927)

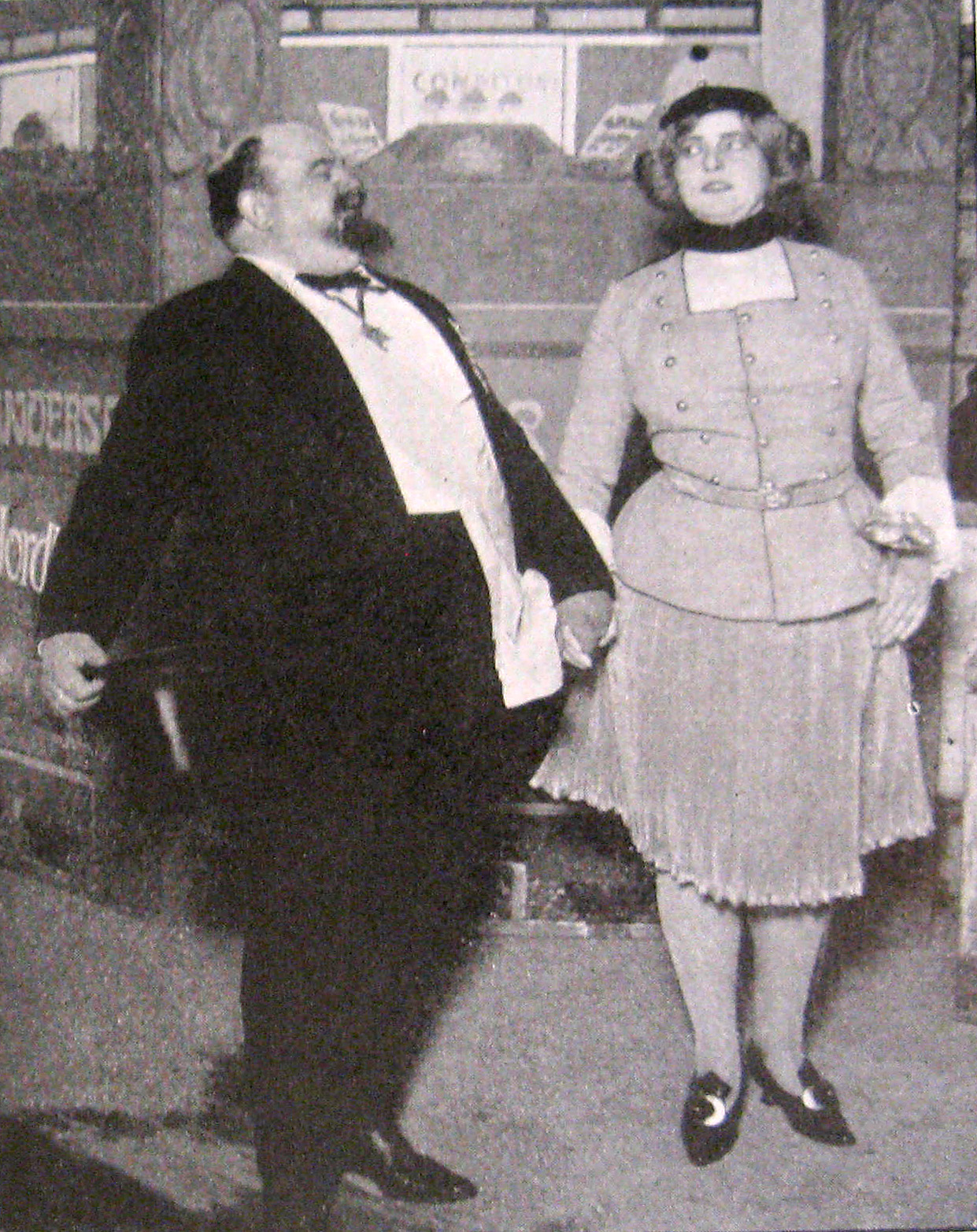
- Stribolt and Viktoria Petersen in 1909
- Born: 12 February 1872
- Died: 20 May 1927 (aged 55)
- Occupation(s): Stage and film actor

Peter Oscar Stribolt (12 February 1872 – 20 May 1927) was a Danish stage and film actor of the silent era in Denmark. He worked prolifically under director Lau Lauritzen Sr.

== Selected filmography ==
- Häxan (English release titles: The Witches and Witchcraft Through The Ages) (1922)
- Kong Bukseløs (English release title: His New Grey Trousers) (1915)
- Familien Pille som Spejdere (English release title: She Would Be a Scout) (1915)
- En slem Dreng (1915)
- De besejrede Pebersvende (1914)
- Afgrunden (English: The Abyss) (1910)
