= Towards the Light (1919 film) =

- Directed by: Holger-Madsen
- Written by: Holger-Madsen
- Starring: Asta Nielsen
- Cinematography: Sophus Wangøe
- Production company: Nordisk Film
- Release date: 21 July 1919
- Country: Denmark
- Languages: Silent; Danish intertitles

Towards the Light (Danish: Mod lyset) is a 1919 Danish silent film directed by Holger-Madsen and starring Asta Nielsen and Augusta Blad. It was Nielsen's last film in her native Denmark.

== Plot ==
Countess Ysabel (Asta Nielsen) is a superficial and coquettish aristocrat who plays with other people's feelings like they were puppets. Inga (Lilly Jacobsson), Professor Maninis (Nicolai Neiiendam) daughter, loves her cousin Felix (Harry Komdrup), but he has only thoughts for Ysabel, which does not go down well with Baron Sandro Grec (Anton de Verdier) who is engaged to the Comtesse.

While all these love entanglements are unfolding, there is also a revival preacher – Elias Renato (Alf Blütecher) – in town. He has dedicated his life to helping the homeless and the poor. He saves the poor orphan girl Wenka (Astrid Holm) who wants to drown herself in the city's park lake, as she has nothing else in life but a drunken stepfather (Hans Dynesen) and a backyard cat.

Felix, like the girl, also wants to commit suicide, but for completely different reasons; he is frustrated and desperate in his hopeless love for the countess. He leaves a suicide note for the countess.

Professor Manini blames the death of countess Felix and tells her that "what you sow, you must reap", but countess Ysabel feels no guilt for Felix's death and marries the baron – despite her mother's warnings against the man.

During the wedding, the baron is revealed to be a card cheat and petty criminal and in fact to be neither baron nor Sandro Grec as he had pretended to be, but instead Leon Spontazzi, so he is arrested by the police just as they are coming home. The scorned bride now finds herself alone with her terrible thoughts, and remembers Professor Manini's reproachful admonition.

Wenka, who has now joined the preacher, takes care of the countess's mother, the widowed countess Prosca (Augusta Blad), who has become seriously ill after her daughter's scandalous marriage. The preacher himself preaches in front of the Countess's castle and the sermon or the music that accompanies his sermon moves the Countess. She follows the preacher to his home for the homeless that he has set up on an island. But she is not a believer, and tries to entice him with her charm and wealth – as the devil (Carl Schenstrøm) tried to lure Jesus. But in vain. Countess Ysabel then sails back from the preacher's island, but now learns that her mother is dead and the grief and desperation drive her to faith and to start preaching herself.

Meanwhile, Wenka's stepfather has also moved to the preacher's island, but old habits are hard to give up and he treats Wenka badly, and accidentally sets the whole island on fire. The fire can be seen from the mainland where Ysabel is located. She immediately sails to the island, but now not as a godless countess, but as a believing woman. On the island, she tells the preacher about her miraculous transformation and declares to him her love and her love for God. They marry and then work together in spreading God's message.

== Cast ==
- Asta Nielsen as Komtesse Ysabel, grevindens datter
- Augusta Blad as Enkegrevinde Prosca
- Frederik Jacobsen as Stiftsprovst Cordes
- Carl Schenstrøm as Djævelen
- Alf Blütecher as Elias Renato, fattigpræst
- Axel Boesen
- Anton De Verdier as Sandro Grec
- Hans Dymsesen as Wenkas stiffader
- Astrid Holm as Wenka
- Lilly Jacobson as Inga, professorens datter
- Harry Komdrup as Felix, professorens nevø
- Henny Lauritzen
- Nicolai Neiiendam as Professor Manini
- Elith Pio as Suffløren
- Birger von Cotta-Schønberg
- Charles Willumsen as Kludesamler Peters

== Bibliography ==
- Sundholm, John & Thorsen, Isak & Andersson, Lars Gustaf & Hedling, Olof & Iversen, Gunnar & Moller, Birgir Thor. Historical Dictionary of Scandinavian Cinema. Scarecrow Press, 2012.
