= Haldis =

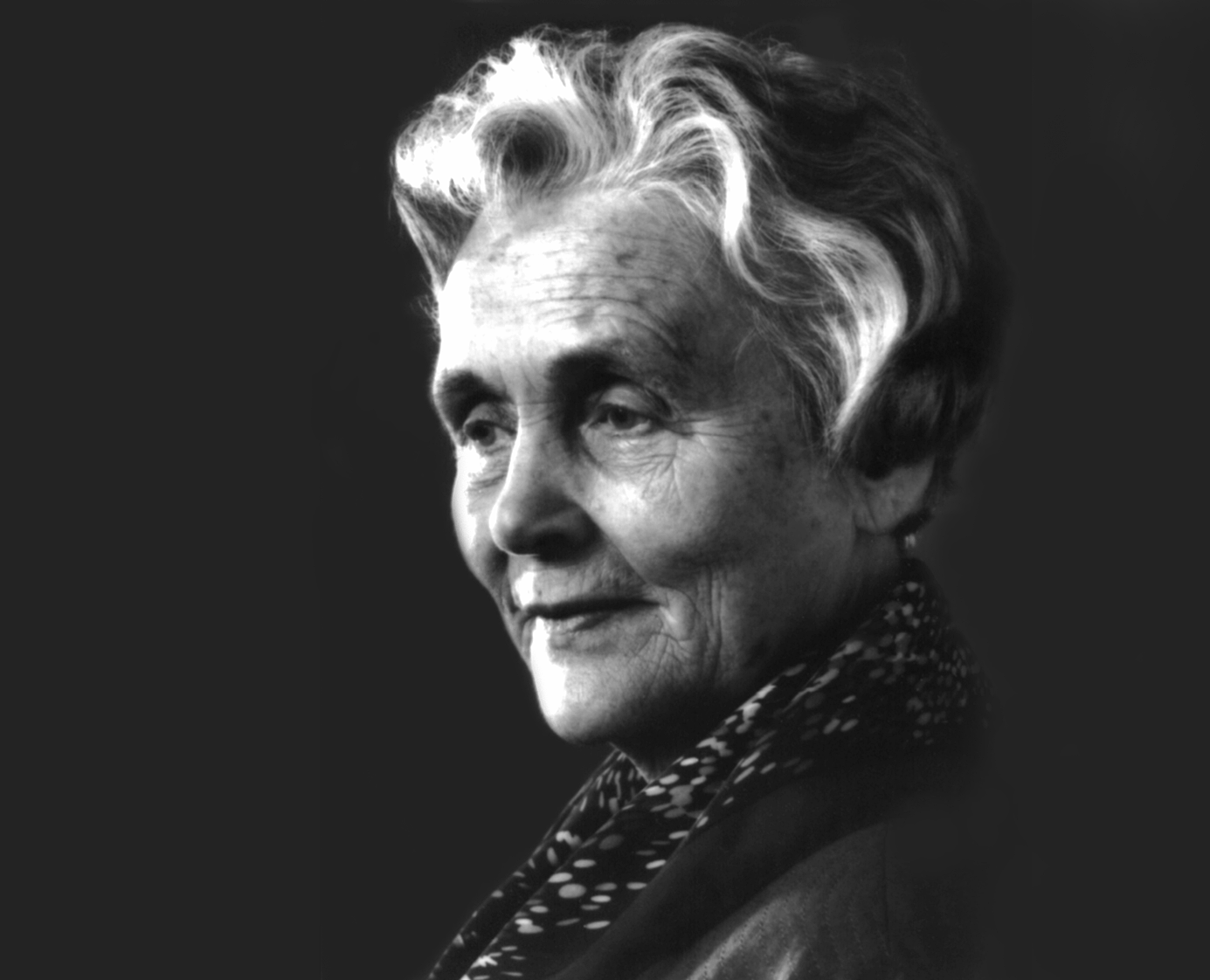
Norwegian poet Halldis Moren Vesaas (1907-1995)

Haldis is a given name. Notable people with the given name include:

- Haldis Halvorsen (1889–1936), Norwegian opera singer
- Haldis Havrøy (1925–2000), Norwegian politician
- Haldis Lenes (born 1957), Norwegian sport rower
- Haldis Tjernsberg (1903–1972), Norwegian politician
