= A Thousand Words of German =

1930 film

- Directed by: Georg Jacoby
- Written by: Walter Schlee; Walter Wassermann; Henry Koster; Hans Wilhelm
- Produced by: Leo Meyer
- Starring: Carl Schenstrøm; Harald Madsen; Paul Westermeier
- Cinematography: Robert Walter
- Music by: Anton Profes
- Production company: Deutsche Lichtspiel-Syndikat
- Distributed by: Deutsche Lichtspiel-Syndikat
- Release date: 5 December 1930
- Running time: 73 minutes
- Country: Germany
- Language: German

A Thousand Words of German (German: 1000 Worte deutsch) is a 1930 German comedy film directed by Georg Jacoby and starring Carl Schenstrøm, Harald Madsen and Paul Westermeier. It was shot at the Halensee Studios in Berlin and on location around the city. The film's sets were designed by the art director Max Heilbronner. Schenstrøm and Madsen appear in their Pat and Patachon personas. Although it was originally intended to be a Multiple-language version with both Danish and German versions, ultimately only the latter was produced.

== Synopsis ==
An international congress of vagrants are meeting in Berlin. It is decided that two representatives should be chosen to negotiate with the German government Fy and Bi are chosen. As the Danes to not speak German they undertake a crash course to learn a thousand words. They meet and are attracted to Mia, but faced problems when they are accused of having squandered the money they were given to learn German and pursued over the city.

== Cast ==
- Carl Schenstrøm as Fy
- Harald Madsen as Bi
- Paul Westermeier as Nunne
- Hans Wassmann as Tippelbrüder-Kongresses
- Hedwig Wangel as Harfenjule
- Adele Sandrock as Adele
- Margot Landa as Mia
- Lilian Ellis as Lilly
- Klaus Pohl as Friseurgehilfe
- Gerhard Dammann as Der Hauswirt
- Heinz Lingen as Verkäufer
- Hansi Arnstaedt as Frau Kersten
- Hans Sobeck as Fussballspieler
- Rolf von Goth as Fussballspieler

== Bibliography ==
- Engberg, Marguerite. Fy & Bi. Gyldendal, 1980.
- Klaus, Ulrich J. Deutsche Tonfilme: Jahrgang 1930. Klaus-Archiv, 1988.
- Tybjerg, Casper & Sorensen, Lars-Martin (ed.) Danish and German Silent Cinema: Towards a Common Film Culture. Edinburgh University Press, 2023.
