= Lau Lauritzen =

Lau Lauritzen may refer to:

- Lau Lauritzen Sr. (1878–1938), Danish film director, screenwriter and actor of the silent era
- Lau Lauritzen Jr. (1910–1977), Danish actor, screenwriter, and film director
