= I kantonnement =

1932 film

- Directed by: Lau Lauritzen Sr.
- Written by: Lau Lauritzen Sr. Lau Lauritzen Jr. Alice O'Fredericks
- Produced by: Svend Nielsen
- Starring: Carl Schenstrøm
- Cinematography: Carlo Bentsen
- Release date: 28 March 1932
- Country: Denmark
- Language: Danish

I kantonnement is a 1932 Danish silent comedy film directed by Lau Lauritzen Sr. It features the acting debut of Poul Reichhardt.

== Cast ==
- Carl Schenstrøm as Fyrtaarnet
- Harald Madsen as Bivognen
- Mona Mårtenson
- Erling Schroeder
- Olga Svendsen
- Anton De Verdier
- Christian Schrøder
- Einar Juhl
- Alex Suhr
- Johannes Andresen
- Christen Møller
- Jørgen Lund
- Poul Reichhardt
