= Han, hun og Hamlet =

1932 film

- Directed by: Lau Lauritzen Sr.
- Written by: Lau Lauritzen Jr. Alice O'Fredericks; A. V. Olsen
- Starring: Marguerite Viby
- Cinematography: Carlo Bentsen; Lau Lauritzen Sr.
- Release date: 8 November 1932
- Running time: 96 minutes
- Country: Denmark
- Language: Danish

Han, hun og Hamlet (He, She, and Hamlet) is a 1932 Danish comedy film directed by Lau Lauritzen Sr.

== Cast ==
- Marguerite Viby as Eva
- Hans W. Petersen as Evas kæreste
- Olga Svendsen as Institutsbestyrerinde
- Christian Arhoff as Teaterdirektøren
- Erna Schrøder as Skuespillerinde
- Jørgen Lund as Skipper
- Einar Juhl as Regissør
- Arthur Jensen as Sømand
- Christian Schrøder as Evas far
- Willy Bille
- Johannes Andresen as Sømand
- Henry Nielsen as Sømand
- Alex Suhr as Fordrukken sømand
- Carl Schenstrøm as Fyrtaarnet
- Harald Madsen as Bivognen
- Solveig Sundborg
- Tove Wallenstrøm as Pupil at the girls' boarding school
- Aage Bendixen as Short sailor
- Poul Reichhardt as Sømand i hængekøje (uncredited)
