= Blad =

Blad or Bladh may refer to:

== People ==
- Adrian Błąd (born 1991), Polish footballer
- Augusta Blad (1871–1953), Danish actress
- Hilding Bladh (1906–1982), Swedish cinematographer
- Lennart Bladh (1920–2006), Swedish politician, member of the Riskdag from 1974 to 1985
- Markus Bladh, Swedish drummer
- Mathias Blad, Swedish actor and singer
- Phillip Bladh, American sound engineer
- Tehilla Blad (born 1995), Swedish actress

== Fungicides ==
- Banda de Lupinus albus doce
- BLAD-containing oligomer, an oligomer of the above, for example in Lupinus mutabilis

== Other uses ==
- Bovine leucocyte adhesion deficiency, animal genetic disease
