= En slem Dreng =

1915 film

- Directed by: Lau Lauritzen Sr.
- Written by: Valdemar Andersen
- Cinematography: Frederik Fuglsang
- Distributed by: Nordisk Film
- Release date: 12 September 1915
- Country: Denmark
- Language: Silent

En slem Dreng (1915)

En slem Dreng is a 1915 Danish silent film directed by Lau Lauritzen Sr. The film stars Lauritz Olsen and Gyda Aller.

== Cast ==
- Lauritz Olsen - Karl King, forfatter
- Gyda Aller - Frøken Mimim, Karl kæreste
- Oscar Stribolt - Brumberg, Karls onkel
- Henny Lauritzen - Fru Brumberg
- Frederik Buch - "Drengen"
- Carl Schenstrøm - Læreren
- Julie Henriksen
