= Valdemar Andersen =

Danish screenwriter and film director

- Born: 9 June 1889; Helsingør, Denmark
- Died: 1 August 1956 (aged 67)
- Occupations: Writer, Director
- Years active: 1913–1942 (film)

Valdemar Andersen (1889–1956) was a Danish screenwriter and film director. He worked as script manager for Nordisk Film.

== Selected filmography ==
- De besejrede Pebersvende (1914)
- En slem Dreng (1915)
- The White Geisha (1926)

== Bibliography ==
- Jean Drum & Dale D. Drum. My Only Great Passion: The Life and Films of Carl Th. Dreyer. Scarecrow Press, 2000.
