= Aage Bendixen =

Danish actor (1887–1973)

- Born: 16 June 1887; Denmark
- Died: 30 December 1973 (aged 86)
- Occupation: Actor
- Years active: 1919–1935

Aage Bendixen (16 June 1887 – 30 December 1973) was a Danish actor. He is best known for his work in short comedy films of the 1920s and 1930s in the Cinema of Denmark.

== Career ==
He began acting in film in 1919 at the age of 32 in Væddeløberen.

== Filmography ==
- Prisoner Number One (1935) - Regissør
- Københavnere (1933)
- Han, hun og Hamlet (1932) - Short sailor
- Pas paa pigerne (1930)
- The Joker (1928)
- Don Quixote (1926)
- Fra Piazza del Popolo (1925)
- Landsvägsriddare (1921) - Släpvagnen
- Kärlek och björnjakt (1920) - Mr. Pålsson
- Flickorna i Åre (1920) - Porter
- Gudernes yndling (1920) - Jack Pudding
- Et Sommereventyr eller De keder sig på Landet (1919)
- Væddeløberen (1919)
