= Herberg for Hjemløse =

1914 film

- Directed by: Lau Lauritzen Sr.
- Written by: Oscar Petersen
- Cinematography: Hugo J. Fischer
- Distributed by: Nordisk Film
- Release date: 2 November 1914
- Country: Denmark
- Language: Silent

Herberg for Hjemløse is a 1914 Danish silent film directed by Lau Lauritzen Sr. The film stars Philip Bech and Torben Meyer.

== Cast ==
- Philip Bech - Forstanderen
- Torben Meyer - Journalist
- Franz Skondrup
- Carl Schenstrøm
- Oscar Nielsen
