= Prisoner Number One =

1935 Danish comedy film

- Directed by: Pál Fejös
- Written by: Fleming Lynge; Paul Sarauw
- Starring: Christian Arhoff; Robert Storm Petersen; Rasmus Christiansen
- Cinematography: Louis Larsen
- Edited by: Lothar Wolff
- Music by: Ferenc Farkas
- Production company: Nordisk Film
- Release date: 16 September 1935
- Running time: 94 minutes
- Country: Denmark
- Language: Danish

Prisoner Number One (Danish: Fange nr. 1) is a 1935 Danish comedy film directed by Pál Fejös and starring Christian Arhoff, Robert Storm Petersen and Rasmus Christiansen.

== Cast ==
- Christian Arhoff as Felix
- Robert Storm Petersen as Fangevogter
- Rasmus Christiansen as Politiinspektør Petræus
- Maria Garland as Fru Petræus
- Tove Wallenstrøm as Irene Petræus
- Victor Montell as Borgmester
- Eigil Reimers as Grev Romano
- Aage Bendixen as Regissør
- Christian Schrøder as Portner
- Erik Hoffman as Baron Satagos
- Petrine Sonne

== Bibliography ==
- Cunningham, John. Hungarian Cinema: From Coffee House to Multiplex. Wallflower Press, 2004. ISBN 978-1-903364-79-6.
- Georges Sadoul & Peter Morris. Dictionary of Film Makers. University of California Press, 1972. ISBN 978-0-520-02151-8.
