= The Monk from Santarem =

1924 film

- Directed by: Lothar Mendes
- Written by: Almeida Garrett (play); Ruth Goetz
- Starring: Evi Eva; Walter Rilla; Vivian Gibson
- Cinematography: Leopold Kutzleb
- Production company: Suprema-Film
- Release date: 4 September 1924
- Running time: 105 minutes
- Country: Germany
- Languages: Silent; German intertitles

The Monk from Santarem (German: Der Mönch von Santarem) is a 1924 German silent drama film, an adaption of the play of the same name by Almeida Garrett. It was directed by Lothar Mendes and stars Evi Eva, Walter Rilla and Vivian Gibson. The film's sets were designed by the art director Ernst Stern. Marlene Dietrich was rumoured to have played in the film but no evidence attests of that, the film being presumably lost.

== Cast ==
- Alf Blütecher
- Emmy Förster
- Vivian Gibson
- Tzwetta Tzatschewa
- Evi Eva
- Alice de Finetti
- Walter Rilla
- Magnus Stifter
- Marlene Dietrich

== Bibliography ==
- Hans-Michael Bock and Tim Bergfelder. The Concise Cinegraph: An Encyclopedia of German Cinema. Berghahn Books.
