= Alf Blütecher =

Norwegian actor

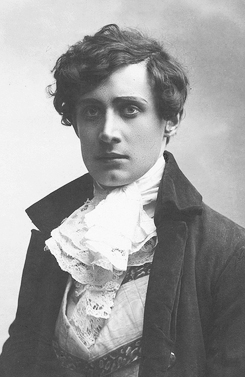
- Born: Alf Wiborg Blütecher; 7 February 1880; Laurdal Municipality, Sweden-Norway
- Died: 5 March 1959 (aged 79); Oslo, Norway
- Occupation: Actor
- Years active: 1913-1930

Alf Blütecher (7 February 1880 – 5 March 1959) was a Norwegian actor. He appeared in more than eighty films from 1913 to 1930.

== Selected filmography ==
Year	Title	Role	Notes
1916	The End of the World	Director Reymers	
1918	A Trip to Mars	Dr. Krafft	
1919	Towards the Light	Elias Renato	
1920	Darwin	Magnus Tibour	
1924	The Final Mask		
1924	The Monk from Santarem		
1925	The Dealer from Amsterdam	Oliver Morrisson	
1926	The Grey House	Herzog	
1926	The Queen of the Baths	Gibson	
