= Familien Pille som Spejdere =

- Directed by: Lau Lauritzen Sr.
- Distributed by: Nordisk Film
- Release date: 25 July 1915
- Country: Denmark
- Language: Silent

Familien Pille som Spejdere (English: She Would Be A Scout) is a 1915 Danish silent film directed by Lau Lauritzen Sr. The film stars Oscar Stribolt, Henny Lauritzen and Carl Schenstrøm.

== Cast ==
- Oscar Stribolt - Pille, apoteker i Lilleby
- Henny Lauritzen - Fru Pille, apotekerfrue
- Carl Schenstrøm - Gert Pille, apotekersøn
