= The White Geisha =

1926 film

- Directed by: Valdemar Andersen; Karl Heiland
- Written by: Valdemar Andersen; Maurice Krol
- Production company: Deutsch-Nordische Film-Union
- Distributed by: Deutsch-Nordische Film-Union
- Release date: 1 October 1926
- Countries: Denmark; Germany
- Languages: Silent; German intertitles

The White Geisha (German: Die weisse Geisha) is a 1926 Danish-German silent drama film directed by Valdemar Andersen and Karl Heiland.

== Cast ==
In alphabetical order

- Irene Ambrus as Lisa
- Philip Bech as Consul Vangen
- Kurt Hermann as Williams
- Loo Holl as Eva Lang
- La Jana
- Peter Nielsen as Sanders
- Hans W. Petersen
- Axel Strøm as Storm
- Carl Wilhelm Tetting as Berg

== Bibliography ==
- Williams, John. Weimar Culture Revisited. Springer, 2011.
