= His New Grey Trousers =

- Directed by: Lau Lauritzen Sr.
- Written by: Eigil Monk
- Cinematography: Hugo J. Fischer
- Distributed by: Nordisk Film
- Release date: 11 October 1915
- Country: Denmark
- Language: Silent

His New Grey Trousers (Danish: Kong Bukseløs) is a 1915 Danish silent film directed by Lau Lauritzen Sr. The film stars Oscar Stribolt and Carl Schenstrøm.

== Cast ==
- Oscar Stribolt - Paludan Plum, digter
- Carl Schenstrøm - Adam Brink, skuespiller
- Agnes Andersen - Bella, en livlig pige
- Frederik Buch - En skomagerdreng
- Franz Skondrup
