= Christian Arhoff =

Danish actor (1893–1973)

- Born: 26 January 1893; Horsens, Denmark
- Died: 9 August 1973 (aged 80)

Christian Hansen Arhoff (26 January 1893 in Horsens – 9 August 1973) was a Danish stage and film actor. Arhoff joined the National Socialist Workers' Party of Denmark in 1941.

== Selected filmography ==
- Talende film - 1923
- Kraft og skønhed - 1928
- Kys, klap og kommers - 1929
- Højt paa en kvist - 1929
- Fare på færde - 1930
- Pas paa pigerne - 1930
- Han, hun og Hamlet - 1932
- Med fuld musik - 1933
- Så til søs - 1933
- Københavnere - 1933
- Flight from the Millions - 1934
- Skaf en sensation - 1934
- Rasmines bryllup - 1935
- Prisoner Number One - 1935
- Sjette trækning - 1936
- Cocktail - 1937
- Flådens blå matroser - 1937
- Under byens tage - 1938
- En lille tilfældighed - 1939
- Sommerglæder - 1940
- I de gode gamle dage - 1940
- Tag det som en mand - 1941
- Ballade i Nyhavn - 1942
- Baby på eventyr - 1942
- Moster fra Mols - 1943
- Bedstemor går amok - 1944
- Lev livet let - 1944
- Panik i familien - 1945
- Mens sagføreren sover - 1945
- Den stjålne minister - 1949
- Lynfotografen - 1950
- Lån mig din kone - 1957
- Pigen og vandpytten - 1958
- Mor skal giftes - 1958
- Vagabonderne på Bakkegården - 1958
- Vi er allesammen tossede - 1959
- Kærlighedens melodi - 1959
- Far til fire på Bornholm - 1959
- Det skete på Møllegården - 1960
- Den grønne elevator - 1961
- Min kone fra Paris - 1961
- Soldaterkammerater på efterårsmanøvre - 1961
- Prinsesse for en dag - 1962
- Der brænder en ild - 1962
- Don Olsen kommer til byen - 1964
- Kampen om Næsbygaard - 1964
- Næsbygaards arving - 1965
- Krybskytterne på Næsbygaard - 1966
- Mig og min lillebror - 1967
- Brødrene på Uglegården - 1967
- Lille mand, pas på! - 1968
- De røde heste - 1968
- Mig og min lillebror og storsmuglerne - 1968
- Mig og min lillebror og Bølle - 1969
- Og så er der bal bagefter - 1970
