= Den kulørte Slavehandler =

1914 Danish silent film

- Directed by: Lau Lauritzen Sr.
- Written by: Martin Jørgensen, Marius Wulff
- Distributed by: Nordisk Film
- Release date: 18 December 1914
- Country: Denmark
- Language: Silent

Den Kulørte Slavehandler (The Colorful Slave Trader, other title Kærlighed og Diplomati or Love and Diplomacy) is a 1914 Danish silent film directed by Lau Lauritzen Sr. on his debut as a film director. Photographs of the film are available at the Danish Film Institute website.

== Cast ==
- Johanne Fritz-Petersen ... Alice
- Johannes Meyer ... Professor Hasse
- Johannes Ring ... Fabrikant Schultze
- Carl Schenstrøm ... Prins Gera
- Christian Schrøder ... Tom Bruce
- Torben Meyer
- Birger von Cotta-Schønberg
- Vita Blichfeldt
- Mathilde Felumb-Friis
