= Johanne Fritz-Petersen =

Danish actress

- Born: 18 October 1879; Denmark
- Died: 22 December 1961 (aged 82)
- Occupation: Actress
- Years active: 1912-1938

Johanne Fritz-Petersen (18 October 1879 – 22 December 1961) was a Danish actress. She appeared in more than 60 films between 1912 and 1938.

== Selected filmography ==
- Den kulørte Slavehandler (1914)
- The End of the World (1916)
- Blaavand melder storm (1938)
