= Darwin (1920 film) =

1920 film

- Directed by: Fritz Bernhardt
- Written by: Hans Brennert; Friedel Köhne
- Starring: Alf Blütecher; Ria Jende; Lya Sellin
- Cinematography: Carl Hilbiber
- Production company: John Hagenbeck-Film
- Release date: 2 April 1920
- Country: Germany
- Languages: Silent; German intertitles

Darwin is a 1920 German silent film directed by Fritz Bernhardt and starring Alf Blütecher, Ria Jende and Lya Sellin.

== Cast ==
- Alf Blütecher as Magnus Tibour
- Ria Jende as Helga Hilbing
- Lya Sellin as Marthe Blan
- Allan Durant as Axel Blan
- Madge Jackson as Winawa
- Wilhelmi as Professor

== Bibliography ==
- Noah William Isenberg. Weimar Cinema: An Essential Guide to Classic Films of the Era. Columbia University Press, 2009.
