= Leif Halvorsen =

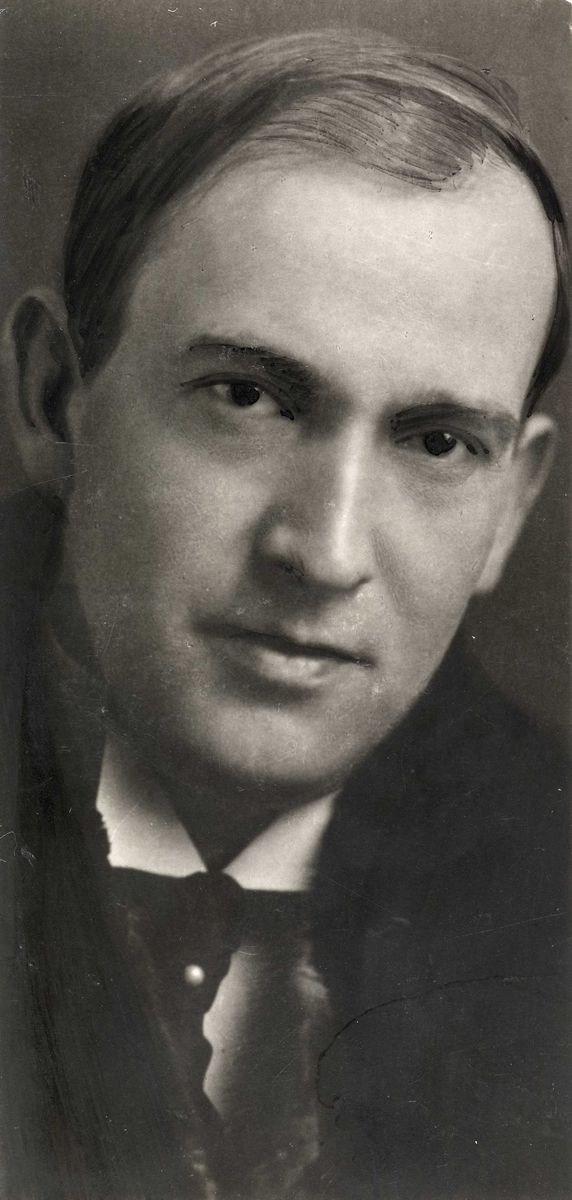

Background information
- Born: July 26, 1887; Kristiania
- Died: December 28, 1959 (aged 72)
- Instrument: Violin
- Years active: 1908–1930s

Leif Fritjof Halvorsen (July 26, 1887 – December 28, 1959) was a Norwegian violinist, conductor, and composer.

Halvorsen was born in Kristiania (now Oslo) and he debuted in Kristiania in 1908. He was a violinist with the National Theater Orchestra from 1904 to 1906, with the Bergen Philharmonic Orchestra from 1906 to 1907, and in Berlin and Paris from 1908 to 1914. Halvorsen was the concert master for the National Theater Orchestra from 1915 to 1917, and the conductor at Oslo's Opera Comique from 1918 to 1921, where he conducted a number of opera performances. He was a music critic for the newspaper Tidens Tegn from 1917 to 1918. For a number of years he was the leader of the Norwegian String Quartet.

In 1920, he succeeded Karl Nissen as director of the St. Cecilia Society Choir (Norwegian: Cæciliaforeningen), and in 1921 he became the director of the Trade Association Choir (Norwegian: Handelsstandens Sangforening). He became the director of the Holter Choir (Norwegian: Holters korforening) in 1930.

Leif Halvorsen was a highly sought-after violin teacher, and he composed violin pieces, a string quartet, two cantatas, piano pieces, and music for poems by Heinrich Heine and Vilhelm Krag.

In 1921 he composed music for the silent film Growth of the Soil (Markens Grøde), directed by the Danish film director Gunnar Sommerfeldt. This was the first Norwegian film to receive original music. The premiere took place at the National Theater on December 26, 1921, where Hamsun himself was present. In 2009, the film with its music by Leif Halvorsen was shown at the Hamsun jubilee in Hamarøy Municipality. A DVD with the movie has been released, with the Norwegian Radio Orchestra playing Leif Halvorsen's score.

Halvorsen was a pioneer in film music with regard to melody and instrumentation. Among his many violin students was Ørnulf Boye Hansen.

In 1915, Halvorsen married the singer Haldis Halvorsen, née Michelsen (1889–1936).

The composer Fartein Valen dedicated his Sonata for Violin and Piano (Opus 3), written between 1912 and 1919, to Halvorsen.
