= Alf's Carpet =

1929 British film by W. P. Kellino

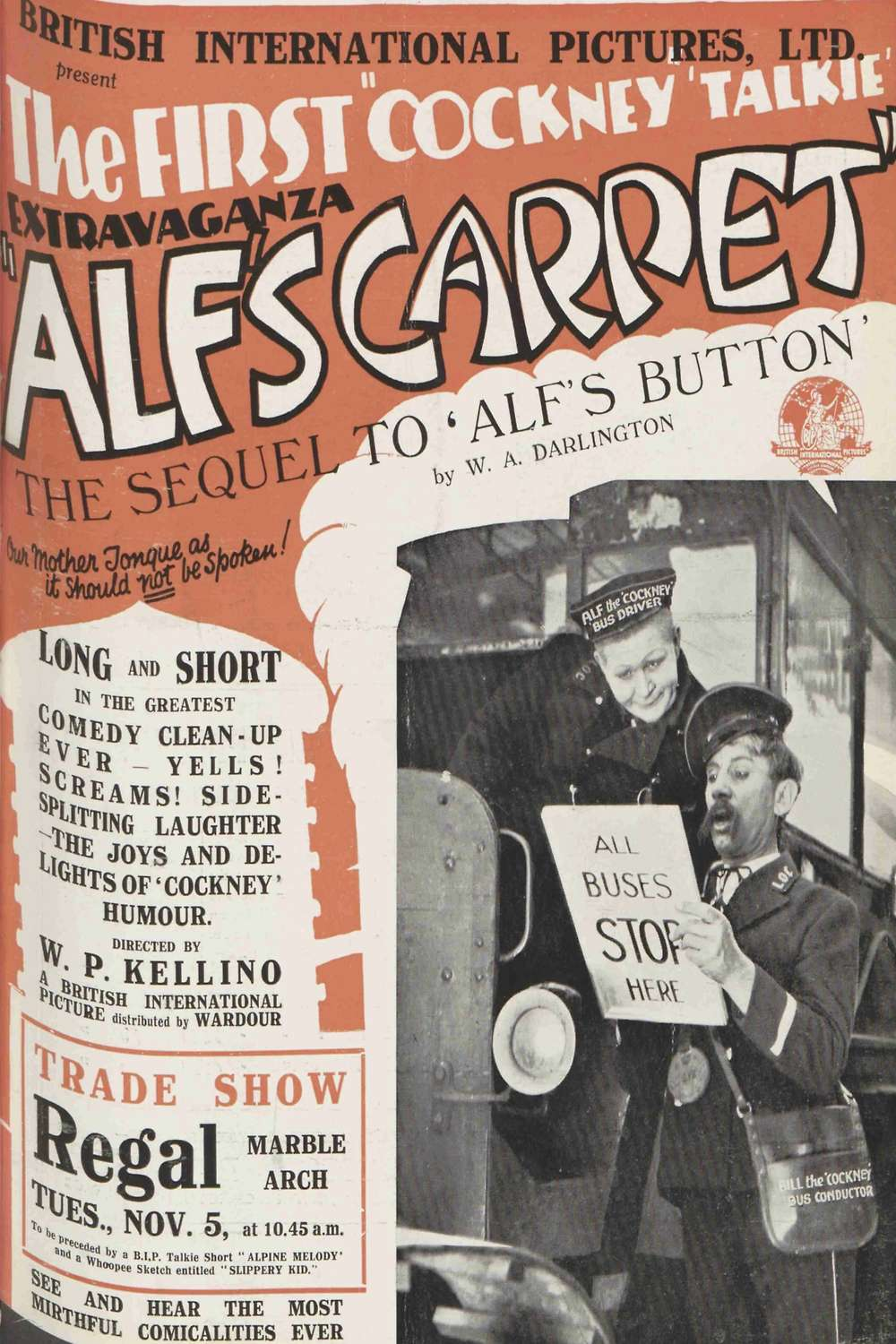
- Theatrical release poster
- Directed by: W. P. Kellino
- Written by: Val Valentine; Arthur Le Clerq; Blanche Metcalfe; Scott Sidney
- Based on: Alf's Button by William Darlington
- Produced by: P.J. de Venloo
- Starring: Gerald Rawlinson; Gladys Hamer; Harald Madsen; Carl Schenstrøm
- Cinematography: Theodor Sparkuhl
- Edited by: Emile de Ruelle
- Production company: British International Pictures
- Distributed by: Wardour Films
- Release date: November 1929
- Running time: 5,500 feet
- Country: United Kingdom
- Languages: Sound (Part-Talkie); English Intertitles

Alf's Carpet is a 1929 sound part-talkie British comedy film directed by W. P. Kellino and starring Gerald Rawlinson, Gladys Hamer, Harald Madsen and Carl Schenstrøm. In addition to sequences with audible dialogue or talking sequences, the film features a synchronized musical score and sound effects along with English intertitles. The film was loosely based on the 1920 novel Alf's Button by W.A. Darlington. It is also known by the alternative title The Rocket Bus.

== Production ==
The film was made by British International Pictures at Elstree Studios. It was originally intended as a synchronized film with a musical score and sound effects, but as British studios switched talking pictures, portions of the film were re-shot with dialogue.

== Cast ==
- Gerald Rawlinson as Jimmy Donaldson
- Gladys Hamer as Lizzie Fletcher
- Harald Madsen as Alf
- Carl Schenstrøm as Bill
- Philip Hewland as Djinn
- Edward O'Neill as Joan's Father
- Janice Adair as Joan
- Frank Perfitt as Caliph

== See also ==
- List of early sound feature films (1926–1929)

== Bibliography ==
- Low, Rachael. History of the British Film, 1918–1929. George Allen & Unwin, 1971.
- Warren, Patricia. Elstree: The British Hollywood. Columbus Books, 1988.
- Wood, Linda. British Films 1927–1939. British Film Institute, 1986.
