= Sons of the Soil =

1921 Danish film

Sons of the Soil Borgslægtens historie Saga Borgarættarinnar
- Directed by: Gunnar Sommerfeldt
- Written by: Gunnar Gunnarsson
- Produced by: Gunnar Sommerfeldt
- Distributed by: Nordisk Film
- Release date: 1920
- Country: Denmark

Sons of the Soil (Danish: Borgslægtens historie, Icelandic: Saga Borgarættarinnar) is a Danish film directed and shot by Gunnar Sommerfeldt in Iceland in 1919, based on the novel by Gunnar Gunnarsson. It was released in 1920, and it was the first film shot in Iceland.

== Cast ==
- Philip Bech – Vivild, banker
- Stefanía Guðmundsdóttir
- Guðmundur Thorsteinsson – Ormar Örlygsson
- Elisabet Jacobsen – Snæbjörg
- Frederik Jacobsen – Örlyg
- Ove Kuhl – Örn
- Karen Poulsen
- Gunnar Sommerfeldt – Ketill
- Inge Sommerfeldt – Danish girl
- Ingeborg Spangsfeldt – Rúna

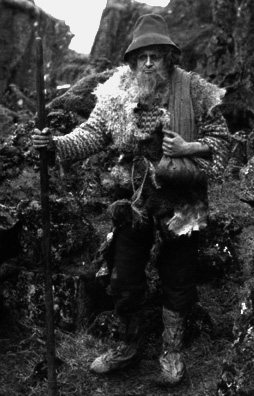
Gunnar Sommerfeldt as Ketill in Sons of the Soil.
