= Svend Kornbeck =

Danish actor (1869-1933)

Svend Kornbeck (3 July 1869 – 30 October 1933) was a Danish stage and film actor.

== Early life and career ==
Kornbeck was born in Copenhagen, the son of painter Johan Peter Kornbeck (1837–1894) and his wife Anna Nathalie Kornbeck (née Trolle) (1849–1930). He was employed in various Copenhagen and provincial theaters; the Dagmar Theatre, Det Ny Teater and the Odense Teater. In 1912 he debuted as a film actor and then starred in some 30 films, all but one were with the Nordisk Film company. One of Kornbeck's more memorable film roles is that of Christian Berg in the 1924 Swedish silent film The Saga of Gosta Berling, directed by Mauritz Stiller.

== Personal life ==
Kornbeck was first married to Asta Johanne Fernanda Jørgensen (1872–1904) and then to actress Ellen Kornbeck (née Pedersen).

== Death ==
Kornbeck died in 1933 in Helsingør, Denmark, at age 64 and is buried at Helsingør Cemetery in a closed tomb.

== Selected filmography ==
- Under mindernes træ (1913)
- Den hvide dame (1913)
- Atlantis (1913)
- Under Blinkfyrets Straaler (1913)
- Det mørke punkt (1913)
- Hvem var forbryderen? (1913)
- Staalkongens Villie (1913)
- Arbejdet adler (1914)
- Eventyrersken (1914)
- Gar el Hama III (1914)
- Evangeliemandens liv (1915)
- Revolutionsbryllup (1915)
- Godsforvalteren (1915)
- Kvinden, han mødte (1915)
- En Skæbne (1915)
- Held i uheld (1915)
- Midnatssolen (1916)
- Kærlighedslængsel (1916)
- Børnevennerne (1916)
- Den hvide Djævel (1916)
- Den omstridte Jord (1916)
- Himmelskibet (1918)
- Folkets Ven (1918)
- Skæbnesvangre Vildfarelser (1918)
- Lykkeper (1920)
- Kærlighedsvalsen (1920)
- Den flyvende Hollænder (I-IV) (1920)
- Vor fælles ven (1921)
- The Saga of Gosta Berling (1924)
- Grænsefolket (1927)
