= Olga Svendsen =

Danish actress

- Born: 22 February 1883; Copenhagen, Denmark
- Died: 22 October 1942 (aged 59); Copenhagen, Denmark

Olga Svendsen (22 February 1883 – 22 October 1942) was a Danish stage and film actress.

== Partial filmography ==
- Storstadens Hyæne (1912) – Zoë
- Gøglernes Elskov (1912) – Mutter Putois
- Sladder (1913, Short)
- Prins for en dag (1913) – Mayor's Wife
- Professor Buchs Rejseeventyr (1913, Short)
- Højt spil (1913, Short)
- Kæmpedamens bortførelse (1913)
- En nydelig ægtemand (1914) – Antoinette, pige hos Descombes
- En skindød ægtemand (1916)
- Maharajaens yndlingsflamme (1919) – Thilde Svæhr
- De er splittergale (1919, Short)
- Landsvägsriddare (1921, Short) – Ms. Svensson
- Film, flirt og forlovelse (1921) – The Lady
- Harestegen (1921) – Mrs. Nokkesen
- Han, hun og Hamlet (1922) – Widow Lykke
- Potteplanten (1922)
- Peter Ligeglad paa Eventyr (1925) – Landlady
- The Joker (1928)
- Hr. Tell og søn (1930) – Tante Malle
- I kantonnement (1931) – Tanten
- Krudt med knald (1931) – Værtinden
- Vask, videnskab og velvære (1932)
- Han, hun og Hamlet (1932) – Institutsbestyrerinde
- Med fuld musik (1933) – Forfatterinden
- Den ny husassistent (1933) – Direktørfruen
- Københavnere (1933) – Olivia
- Kidnapped (1935) – Hansine
- Provinsen kalder (1935)
- Bag Københavns kulisser (1935) – Pensionatsværtinde
- Snushanerne (1936) – Syngende Havfrue
- Sjette trækning (1936) – Fru Julie 'Julle' Lund (final film role)
