= Alex Suhr =

Danish actor (1898–1964)

- Born: 7 October 1898; Copenhagen, Denmark
- Died: 29 May 1964 (aged 65); Glostrup, Denmark
- Occupation: Actor
- Years active: 1923–1963

Alex Suhr (7 October 1898 – 29 May 1964) was a Danish film actor. He appeared in 32 films between 1923 and 1963. He was born in Copenhagen, Denmark and died in Denmark.

== Selected filmography ==
- Kan Kærlighed kureres? (1923)
- Grænsefolket (1927)
- Thi kendes for ret (1929)
- Hallo, Afrika forude (1929)
- Højt paa en Kvist (1929)
- Pas paa pigerne (1930)
- I kantonnement (1932)
- Han, hun og Hamlet (1932)
- Med fuld musik (1932)
- Københavnere (1933)
- Ud i den kolde sne (1934)
- Kidnapped (1935)
- Min kone er husar (1935)
- Frk. Møllers jubilæum (1937)
- Incognito (1937)
- Sommerglæder (1940)
- En mand af betydning (1941)
- Tak fordi du kom, Nick (1941)
- Kriminalassistent Bloch (1943)
- En ny dag gryer (1945)
- Sikken en nat (1947)
- Calle og Palle (1948)
- Den stjålne minister (1949)
- Lejlighed til leje (1949)
- Lynfotografen (1950)
- Mariannes bryllup (1958)
- Lyssky transport gennem Danmark (1958)
- Frihedens pris (1960)
- The Musketeers (1961)
- Reptilicus (1961)
- Sorte Shara (1961)
- Støv på hjernen (1961)
- Dronningens vagtmester (1963)
- Vi har det jo dejligt (1963)
