= Christian Schrøder =

Danish actor (1869–1940)

- Born: 13 July 1869; Middelfart, Denmark
- Died: 10 December 1940 (aged 71); Copenhagen, Denmark
- Occupations: Actor, screenwriter, director
- Years active: 1912–1940

Christian Schrøder (13 July 1869 – 10 December 1940) was a Danish film actor, screenwriter and director. He was also a captain in the reserve. He appeared in 30 films between 1912 and 1940, mostly farce and comedy. He was born in Middelfart, Denmark, and died in Copenhagen, Denmark.

== Selected filmography ==
- Atlantis (1913)
- Den kulørte Slavehandler (1914)
- The Joker (1928)
- I kantonnement (1932)
- Han, hun og Hamlet (1932)
- Københavnere (1933)
- Ud i den kolde sne (1934)
- Kidnapped (1935)
- Prisoner Number One (1935)
- Week-end (1935)
- Unfriendly Relations (1936)
- Conscientious Objector Adolf (1936)
- I de gode, gamle dage (1940)
