= De besejrede Pebersvende =

- Directed by: Lau Lauritzen Sr.
- Written by: Valdemar Andersen
- Cinematography: Hugo J. Fischer
- Distributed by: Nordisk Film
- Release date: 28 December 1914
- Country: Denmark
- Language: Silent

De besejrede Pebersvende is a 1914 Danish silent film directed by Lau Lauritzen Sr.

== Cast ==
- Oscar Stribolt - Dam, pebersvend
- Frederik Buch - Brik, pebersvend
- Carl Schenstrøm - Spill, pebersvend
- Franz Skondrup - Glud, nygift
- Ellen Kornbeck - Betty Glud, nygift
