= Cocktails (film) =

1928 British film by Monty Banks

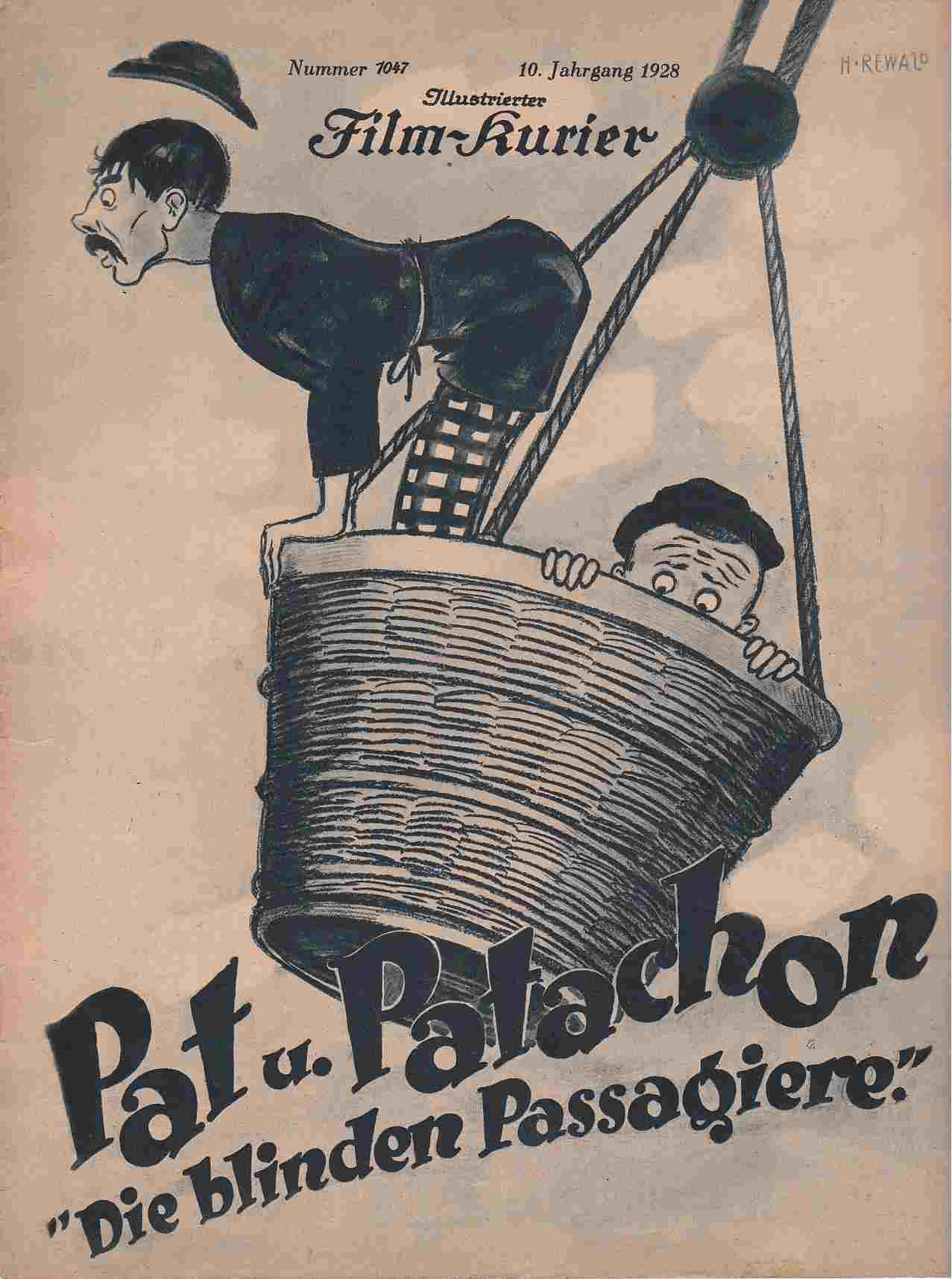
- German poster
- Directed by: Monty Banks
- Written by: Roger Burford; Rex Taylor
- Starring: Carl Schenstrøm; Harald Madsen; Enid Stamp-Taylor; Harry Terry
- Production company: British International Pictures
- Distributed by: Wardour Films
- Release date: December 1928
- Country: United Kingdom
- Language: English

Cocktails is a 1928 British silent comedy film directed by Monty Banks and starring Harald Madsen, Enid Stamp-Taylor and Carl Schenstrøm.

== Plot ==
The guardian of an heiress tries to destroy the reputation of her lover by planting drugs on him.

== Cast ==
- Carl Schenstrøm as Gin
- Harald Madsen as It
- Enid Stamp-Taylor as Betty
- Harry Terry as Bosco
- Tony Wylde as Jerry
- Nigel Barrie as Giles
- Lorna Duveen as Mary
- Warren Hastings as Judge

== Bibliography ==
- Low, Rachael. History of the British Film, 1918-1929. George Allen & Unwin, 1971.
