= Vildledt Elskov =

- Directed by: August Blom
- Cinematography: Axel Graatkjær
- Distributed by: Fotorama. Nordisk Films
- Release date: 3 July 1911
- Country: Denmark
- Language: Danish

Vildledt Elskov is a 1911 Danish silent film directed by August Blom under the Nordisk Films banner.

== Cast ==
- Otto Lagoni -Bankdirektøren
- Ella la Cour - Fruen
- Clara Wieth - Datteren
- Richard Christensen - Studenten
- Lau Lauritzen Sr. - Charles
- Julie Henriksen -Fabrikspigen
- Emilie Sannom - T-jenestepigen
- Svend Cathala
- Gudrun Bruun Stephensen
- Frederik Jacobsen
