= Sons in Law =

1926 film

- German: Schwiegersöhne
- Directed by: Hans Steinhoff
- Written by: Ida Jenbach; Hans Steinhoff
- Starring: Harald Madsen; Carl Schenstrøm; Wilhelm Diegelmann
- Production company: Hugo Engel-Filmgesellschaft
- Release date: 25 December 1926
- Running time: 102 minutes
- Country: Austria
- Languages: Silent; German intertitles

Sons in Law (German: Schwiegersöhne) is a 1926 Austrian silent comedy film directed by Hans Steinhoff and starring Harald Madsen, Carl Schenstrøm and Wilhelm Diegelmann.

== Cast ==
- Harald Madsen as Patachon
- Carl Schenstrøm as Pat
- Wilhelm Diegelmann
- Oskar Sima
- Marietta Millner
- Vera Voronina
- Gorm Schmidt
- Agnes Petersen-Mozzuchinowa
- Gisela Gunther
- Hans Jaray
- Eugen Neufeld
