= The Pale Count =

1937 film

- Directed by: Gösta Rodin
- Written by: Gösta Rodin; Guido Valentin
- Starring: Carl Schenstrøm; Harald Madsen; Hilding Gavle
- Cinematography: Sven Thermænius
- Edited by: Gösta Rodin
- Music by: Ernfrid Ahlin; Gunnar Malmström
- Production company: Triangelfilm
- Distributed by: Svensk Talfilm
- Release date: 22 February 1937
- Running time: 81 minutes
- Country: Sweden
- Language: Swedish

The Pale Count (Swedish: Bleka greven) is a 1937 Swedish comedy film directed by Gösta Rodin and starring Carl Schenstrøm, Harald Madsen and Hilding Gavle. The film's sets were designed by the art director Bertil Duroj.

== Synopsis ==
A series of hauntings take place at a baronial residence, but it becomes clear that these are in fact being staged to scare the occupants away.

== Cast ==
- Carl Schenstrøm as Fyrtornet
- Harald Madsen as Släpvagnen
- Hilding Gavle as Count Rouglas Gyllenspjuth
- Anna Olin as Countess Evelina Gyllenspjuth
- Karin Albihn as Anne-Marie Andersson
- Gösta Gustafson as Larsson
- Aina Rosén as Betty Larsson
- Magnus Kesster as Göran
- Torsten Bergström as Lawyer
- Emil Fjellström as Olsson

== Bibliography ==
- Larsson, Mariah & Marklund, Anders. Swedish Film: An Introduction and Reader. Nordic Academic Press, 2010.
