= Frederik Jacobsen =

Danish actor

- Born: 12 September 1876; Copenhagen, Denmark
- Died: 4 September 1922 (aged 45)
- Occupation: Actor
- Years active: 1933 – 1951

Frederik Jacobsen (12 September 1876 – 4 September 1922), was a Danish actor. He appeared in 27 films between 1911 and 1923.

== Selected filmography ==
- Vildledt Elskov (1911)
- A Trip to Mars (1918)
- Towards the Light (1919)
