= A Trip to Mars =

Himmelskibet
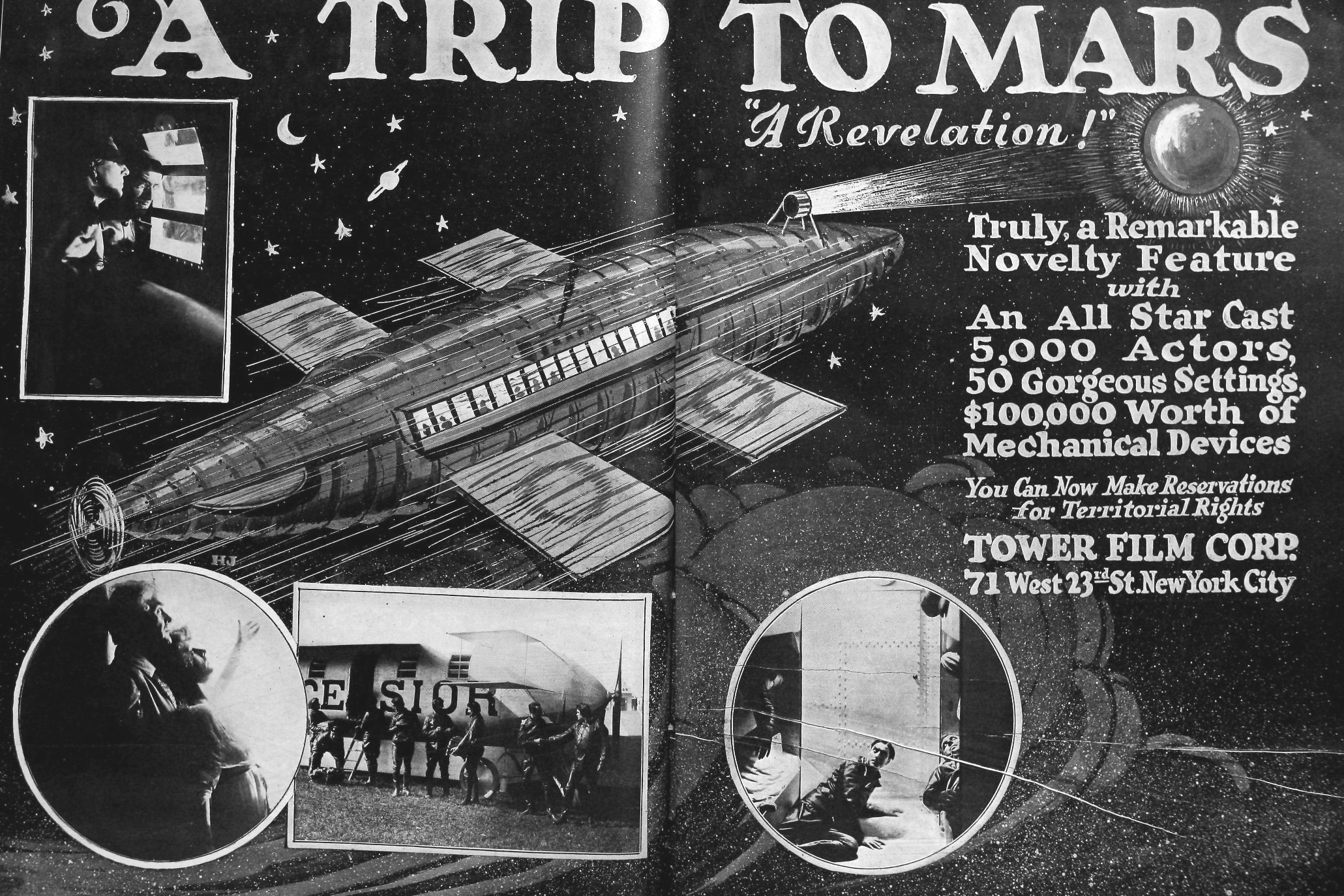
- Advertisement in Motion Picture News, 1920
- Directed by: Holger-Madsen
- Written by: Sophus Michaelis (the novel Himmelskibet) adapted by Ole Olsen
- Starring: Gunnar Tolnæs; Zanny Petersen; Nicolai Neiiendam; Alf Blütecher; Svend Kornbeck; Philip Bech; Lilly Jacobson; Frederik Jacobsen
- Cinematography: Frederik Fuglsang; Louis Larsen
- Distributed by: Nordisk Films Kompagni
- Release date: 22 February 1918
- Running time: 81 minutes
- Languages: Silent film Danish intertitles

Himmelskibet

A Trip to Mars (Danish: Himmelskibet, or Heaven Ship) is a 1918 Danish film about a trip to Mars. In 2006, the film was restored and released on DVD by the Danish Film Institute.

Phil Hardy says it is "the film that marked the beginning of the space opera subgenre of science fiction," but notes that Denmark did not make another science fiction film until Reptilicus in 1961.

== Plot ==
Scientists build an airship called the Excelsior, and travel to Mars. They find a utopian civilization on the planet, dedicated to pacifism. The captain falls in love with Marya, the daughter of Mars' philosopher-king, and she must get her father's blessing before they return to Earth and get married.

== Cast ==
- Gunnar Tolnæs as Avanti Planetaros - Captain of the Space Ship
- Zanny Petersen as Corona, Avanti's Sister
- Nicolai Neiiendam as Professor Planetaros, Astronomer
- Alf Blütecher as Dr. Krafft, Avanti's Friend
- Svend Kornbeck as David Dane, American
- Philip Bech as Martian leader - Wise Man
- Lilly Jacobson as Marya, Martian Leader's Daughter
- Frederik Jacobsen as Professor Dubius

== Production crew ==
- Production Design by Carlo Jacobsen
- Art Direction by Axel Bruun

== Reception ==
Critic Jörg Hartmann observes, "The humanoid Martian woman may still play the role of a coveted object, but it is her own independent decision to leave her home planet to spread a Martian message of peace through her love affair with the human captain. The pacifist attitude propagated in A Trip to Mars was aimed at the contemporary film audience, who saw the film when the First World War was still raging."

Similarly, Matthew Coniam writes, "A Trip to Mars was produced at a time when the First World War was showing little sign of ending, and in this respect the film cannot fail to impress when seen as a plea for compassion and tolerance, featuring as it does perhaps the least antagonistic meeting of Martians and Earthlings in screen history."

== See also ==
- List of films set on Mars
- Human mission to Mars
