= Growth of the Soil (1921 film) =

1921 film

- Norwegian: Markens grøde
- Directed by: Gunnar Sommerfeldt
- Written by: Gunnar Sommerfeldt
- Based on: Growth of the Soil, by Knut Hamsun
- Produced by: Gunnar Sommerfeldt
- Starring: Amund Rydland; Karen Thalbitzer; Almar Hamsun; Sivert Eliassen; Gunnar Sommerfeldt
- Cinematography: George Schnéevoigt
- Music by: Leif Halvorsen
- Distributed by: Norrøna Film
- Release date: 1921
- Running time: 117 minutes
- Country: Norway
- Language: Norwegian

Growth of the Soil (Norwegian: Markens grøde) is a Norwegian silent film from 1921 based on Knut Hamsun's novel Growth of the Soil. The Danish filmmaker Gunnar Sommerfeldt wrote the screenplay and directed the film, and he also played the role of the bailiff Geissler in the film. Sommerfeldt invested DKK 240,00 in the film, which was a considerable sum in 1921.

== Story ==
Growth of the Soil (1921)

The film opens with images from a forest under a glacier, where Isak Sellanrå is clearing the land. Eventually, however, the perspective begins to change, and smaller stories break in and toward the story of Isak and Inger. A modern society is emerging around the two. The story of young Barbro walking into the river with her child, but still ending with Aksel, also receives significant attention.

== Filming ==
The filming took place in Rana Municipality in Norway and was a very big local event. A number of locals were used as extras and for minor roles. Isaac's clearing was filmed in Røvassdalen, and other parts were filmed at Tverånes in Mo i Rana, and Hemnesberget and Korgen. A couple of Sami were also hired from the neighboring Swedish municipality of Tärna.

== Rediscovery ==
For many years, the film was presumed lost. It then reappeared in several places. An American professor owned a shortened edition, and it is believed that this 60-minute film was the version that was screened in the United States in 1928. A longer version surfaced in the Netherlands. These two copies were combined to create the version that was screened in 2009 during Hamsun Days.

== Cast ==
- Amund Rydland: Isak
- Karen Poulsen: Inger (credited as Karen Thalbitzer)
- Ragna Wettergreen: Oline
- Gunnar Sommerfeldt: Geissler, the bailiff
- Inge Sommerfeldt: Barbro
- Almar Bjørnefjell: Elesius, a young farmer
- Sigurd Berg Bruland: Brede Olsen, a farmboy
- Siljusson av Terna: Os-Anders
- Sivert Eliassen. Sivert
- Ernst Vaumund: Aksel Strøm
- Rolf Christensen
- Sigurd Køvatn
- Sesse Schanke

== See also ==
- Growth of the Soil (2026 film)
