= Augusta Blad =

Danish actress (1871–1953)

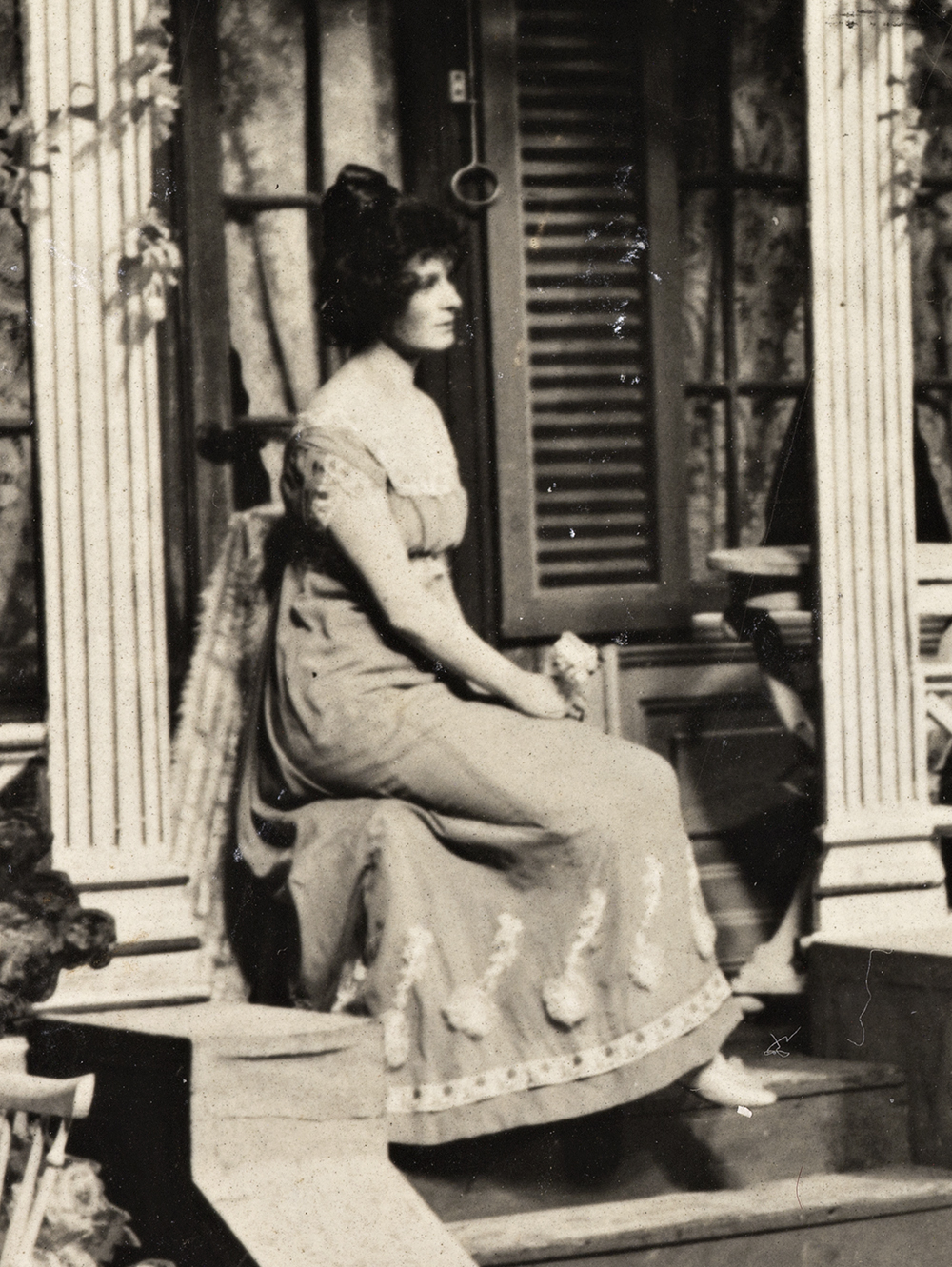
- Augusta Blad in De Danske i Paris
- Born: 10 January 1871; Copenhagen, Denmark
- Died: 9 November 1953 (aged 82); Frederiksberg
- Spouse: Wilhelm Wiehe
- Parent(s): Caspar Frederik Siegfred Blad & Louise Dorothea Blad (born Rasmussen)

Augusta Blad (10 January 1871 in Copenhagen – 9 November 1953 in Frederiksberg) was a Danish actress.

She was educated at the Royal Theatre's student school (admitted to 1889) and debuted at the Royal Danish Theatre in 1892 as Sophie in Adam Oehlenschläger's piece Erik and Abel of 1820. From 1894 to 1910 she was at Dagmarteatret and then returned to the Royal Theatre where she spent the next forty years until 1950. She played with many of the greatest names of the time and was especially known for being an excellent performer of Oehlenschläger's work.

She made her film debut in 1911 at Nordisk Film in the successful film At the Prison Gate. After that, she was one of Nordisk Film's most prominent actresses and appeared in over 30 silent films. In 1917 she joined Valdemar Psilander's new film company, which was taken over by Olaf Fønss after his death in the same year. In this company, she starred in four silent films, including Towards the Light in 1929. She also starred in a single sound film: Summer Joys from 1940, which was also her last film.

She was the daughter of director Siegfred Blad (1835–1902) and Louise Dorothea Blad (née Rasmussen) (1837–1917). In December 1899 she married actor Wilhelm Wiehe (1858-1916). The marriage was dissolved in 1904. Augusta Blad died on 9 November 1953, and is buried at Mariebjerg Cemetery in Gentofte.

She received the Danish royal Ingenio et arti award in 1934.
