= Karen Poulsen =

Danish actress (1881–1953)

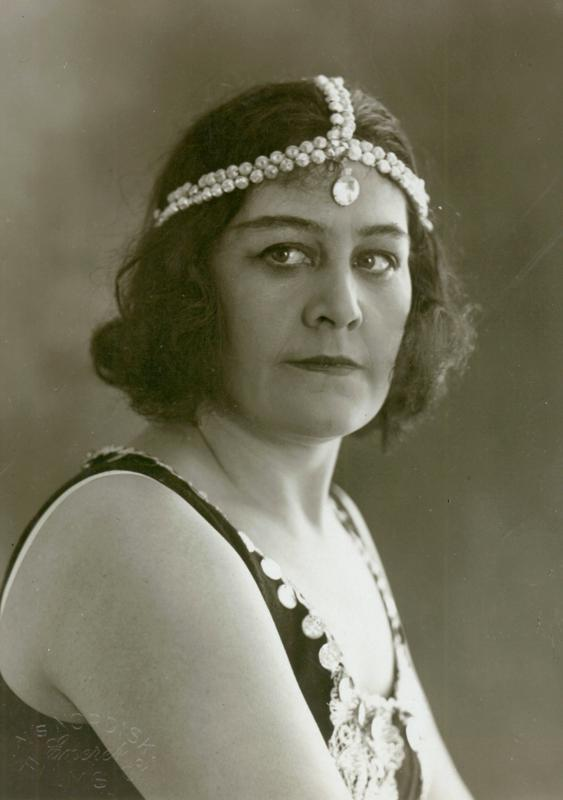
- Born: 10 May 1881; Denmark
- Died: 15 February 1953 (aged 71)
- Other names: Karen Lund; Karen Thalbitzer

Karen Poulsen (10 May 1881 – 15 February 1953) was a Danish stage and early film actress. She performed regularly at the Royal Danish Theatre until 1938 and took part in many silent and sound films from 1911 to 1950.

== Early life ==
Born in Copenhagen on 10 May 1881, Karen Poulsen was the daughter of the celebrated stage actor Olaf Poulsen (1849–1923) and his wife, the ballet dancer Henriette Emilie née Bryde (1846–1909). After being trained by her father, she became a pupil at the school of the Royal Danish Theatre where she made her debut on 4 February 1900 as Pernille in Ludvig Holberg's Gert Westphaler. She was appreciated for her good humour and clear diction.

== Career ==
After gaining further experience while performing for a number of seasons at Copenhagen's Dagmarteatret, she went on to perform in the provinces, including a period at the Aarhus Theatre, where she played the leading role in Hervé's Frøken Nitouche. She then performed at Det Ny Teater in Copenhagen from its opening in 1908. With her father's assistance, she was able to return to the Royal Theatre in 1912 where she performed comic roles such as Tante Malle in Bjørnstjerne Bjørnson's Geografi og Kærlighed. Maintaining a good place in the company's repertoire, she performed particularly well in her Holberg roles. She remained with the company until 1938, when disappointed with her lack of progress, she left to perform in the more promising private theatres of Copenhagen. At the Frederiksberg Teater, she took the leading role in Gustav Wied's Hendes gamle Naade (1941) and played Julia Gibbs, a mother in Thornton Wilder's Our Town (1942).

Poulsen made her film debut in 1911 with Nordisk Film, appearing in 28 silent movies until 1928. In 1931, as Tosse-Grete in Hotel Paradis, she embarked on her career in sound films taking mainly fairly minor roles, frequently as a strong or bohemian women. She was however acclaimed for playing the Grandmother in Ditte, Child of Man (1946). Her last film appearance was in 1950 as Ane, the fortune teller in Historien om Hjortholm. Poulsen also frequently took part in Danish radio dramas.

== Marriages ==
Karen Poulsen was married three times, first to the actor Valdemar Lund in 1902, then to the journalist and athlete Bjørn Thalbitzer in 1919, and finally to the banker Mogens la Cour Kruse in 1928. As a result, she also appeared as Karen Lund and Karen Thalbitzer.

== Filmography ==
This list includes her appearances as Karen Lund and Karen Tralbizter.

Year	Title	Role	Notes
1911	Privatsekretæren	Rigs wife	
1911	Balletdanserinden	Simon's Frau	
1912	Jernbanens datter	Alexandra	
1912	Den kære Afdøde	Mrs. Bang	
1913	Paa Vildspor		
1915	Billedhuggeren	Nanna	
1915	Zirli	Sasa	
1916	Gloria		
1916	Lotte vil paa Landet	Singer	
1916	Mørkets Fyrste	Cleo Bernard - Adventuress	
1917	Naar Hadet slukkes	Lolo - Adventuress	
1918	Dommens dag	Pitch black, gypsy woman	
1920	Sons of the Soil		
1921	Growth of the Soil	Inger	
1922	Jafet, der søger sig en Fader I-IV	Natté - Gipsy	
1922	Der var engang	Bolette	
1931	Hotel Paradis	Tosse-Grete	
1932	Kirke og orgel	Grethis moster	
1933	Nyhavn 17	Hilda Rask	
1933	Tango	Tangobar-gæst	
1934	Nøddebo Præstegård	Sidse	
1937	Det begyndte ombord	Emma Fischer	
1939	Elverhøj	Mor Karen	
1940	Sommerglæder	Fru Graa	
1941	Gå med mig hjem	Enkefrue	
1942	Alle mand på dæk	Hertuginde i bar	
1943	Møllen	Lises mor	
1944	Mordets melodi	Påklæderske Flora Kristiansen	
1946	Fyrtøjet	Heksen	Voice
1946	Ditte Menneskebarn	Maren - Dittes bedstemor	
1950	Historien om Hjortholm	Ane Steffens	(final film role)
