= Norwegian new realism =

Literary movement

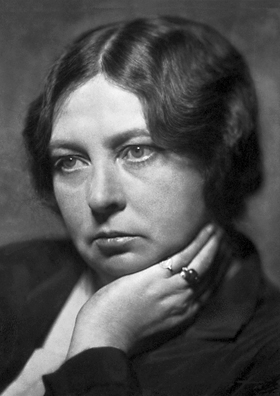
Sigrid Unset headshot

The Norwegian new realism was a literary movement that dominated Norwegian literature in the first half of the 20th century. Prominent examples include Knut Hamsun's later work, Sigrid Undset, Johan Falkberget, and Olaf Bull. Both Knut Hamsun and Sigrid Undset were awarded the Nobel Prize in Literature.
