= Haldis Halvorsen =

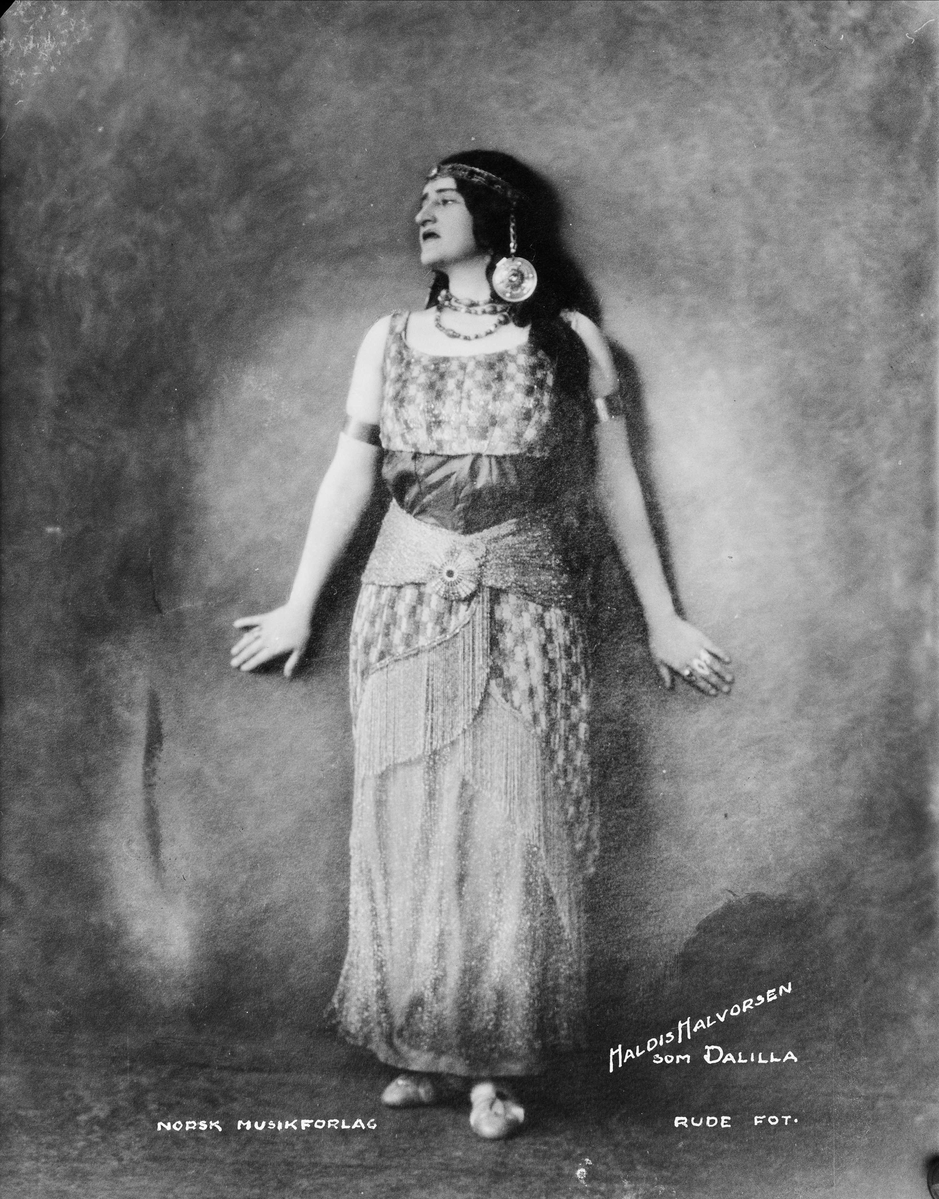
- Haldis Halvorsen as Delilah in 1919

Background information
- Born: September 22, 1889; Dale, Norway
- Died: August 17, 1936 (aged 46) Høyanger, Norway
- Occupation: Opera singer
- Years active: 1912–1921

Haldis Halvorsen (September 22, 1889 – August 17, 1936) was a Norwegian mezzo-soprano opera singer.

== Biography ==
Halvorsen was born Haldis Michelsen in Dale, Norway, the daughter of the parish priest Edvard Johan Michelsen and Helene Sofie Ziesler Smith. From 1907 to 1912 she studied singing under Marie Irgens in Kristiania (now Oslo) and then continued her training in Berlin. She debuted as a singer in Kristiania in 1912. In 1915, she married the violinist Leif Halvorsen.

Halvorsen worked for Oslo's Opera Comique from 1918 to 1921, where among other roles she played Delilah in Samson and Delilah, Rachel in La Juive, Elisabeth in Tannhäuser, and Azucena in Il trovatore. She performed in Norway, Sweden, Denmark, and Germany, and appeared with the Berlin State Opera and at the Kiel Opera House.

Halvorsen gave the debut performances of several works by Norwegian composers, including Fartein Valen's Ave Maria (opus 4) and Mignon – Zwei Gedichte von Goethe (opus 7). The latter work was also dedicated to Halvorsen.
