= Henny Lauritzen =

Danish actress

- Born: Henny Johanne Marie Lauritzen; 5 April 1871; Denmark
- Died: 7 December 1938 (aged 71)

Henny Johanne Marie Lauritzen (5 April 1871 – 7 December 1938) was a Danish stage and film actress of the silent era in Denmark. She worked under directors such as August Blom and Lau Lauritzen Sr.

== Selected filmography ==
- En slem Dreng (1915)
- Familien Pille som Spejdere (1915)
- The Mysterious Footprints (1918)
