= Carl Schenstrøm =

Danish actor (1881–1942)

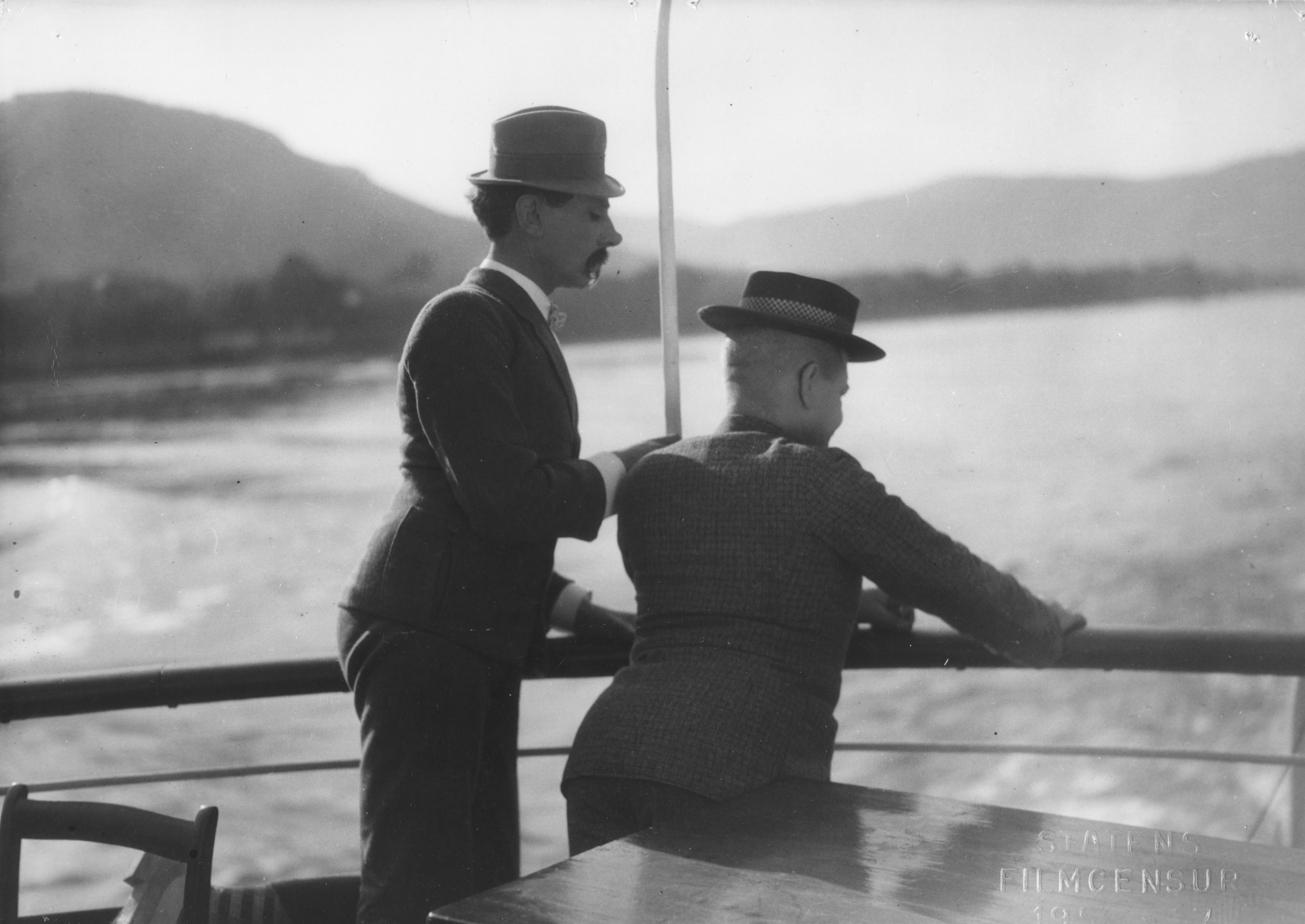
- 'Kys, klap og kommers' 1929
- Born: 13 November 1881; Denmark
- Died: 10 April 1942 (aged 60)

Karl Georg Harald Schenstrøm (13 November 1881 – 10 April 1942) was a Danish stage and film actor of the silent era in Denmark. He worked under directors such as August Blom and Lau Lauritzen Sr.

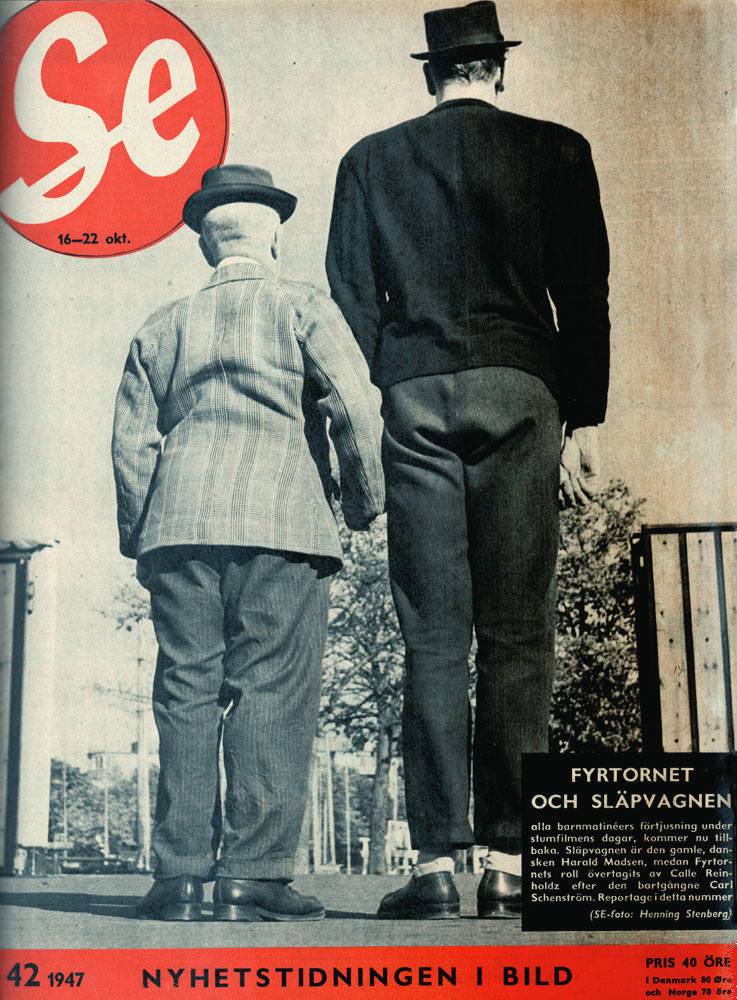
Fy og Bi in the magazine Se, 1947

Together with Harald Madsen, Schenstrøm formed the Danish comedian couple Fyrtårnet og Bivognen (Fy og Bi), known as "Long & Short" in England and "Ole & Axel" in the U.S.

== Selected filmography ==
- Den hvide Slavehandels sidste Offer (1911) - Count X
- Mormonens offer (English:A Victim of the Mormons) (1911) - Larssons Mormon Friend
- Vampyrdanserinden (English: The Vampire Dancer) (1912)
- Historien om en moder (1912)
- Bøffen og bananen (1913)
- Kæmpedamens bortførelse (1913)
- Chatollets Hemmelighed (1913)
- Atlantis (1913)
- Elskovsleg (1914) - Doden
- I kammerherrens klæder (1914)
- Millionærdrengen (1914) - Prof. Sihm
- Midnatssolen (1914) - Miner
- Helvedesmaskinen (1914)
- Herberg for Hjemløse (1914, Short)
- Detektivens barnepige (1914) - Count von Warden
- Uden Fædreland (1914)
- Den kulørte Slavehandler (1914) - Prins Gera
- De besejrede Pebersvende (1914) - Spill
- Bytte Roller (1914)
- Evangeliemandens liv (1915)
- Skorstensfejeren kommer i morgen (1915)
- Det blaa vidunder (1915)
- Familien Pille som Spejdere (1915, Short) - Gert Pille
- En slem Dreng (1915, Short)
- Kong Bukseløs (English release title: His New Grey Trousers) (1915, Short) - Adam Brink - Actor
- Kampen om barnet (1915) - Pub Guest
- Den hvide djævel (1916)
- Gar el Hama IV (1916)
- Værelse Nr. 17 (1916)
- Filmens Datter (1916)
- Hjerteknuseren (1918) - Theobald Smit
- Mästerkatten i stövlar (1918) - En man på festen
- Brændt a (1919)
- Hans store Chance (1919)
- Krigsmillionæren (1919)
- Manden der gøer (1919) - Bønne
- Towards the Light (1919) - Djævelen
- Hvorledes jeg kom til Filmen (1919)
- Hendes mands forlovede (1919)
- Gudernes yndling (1920)
- De nygifte (1920)
- Silkesstrumpan (1921) - Alfred
- Ungkarleliv (1921) - Knast - Bachelor
- Vor fælles Ven (1921)

=== Ole & Axel Films ===
- Film, flirt og forlovelse (1921) - Fyrtaarnet
- Landliggeridyl - Vandgang (1921) - Fyrtaarnet
- Sol, sommer og studiner (1922) - Fyrtaarnet
- Han, hun og Hamlet (1922) - Fyrtaarnet
- Kan Kærlighed kureres? (1923) - Long
- Vore venners vinter (1923) - Fyrtaarnet
- Daarskab, dyd og driverter (1923) - Fyrtaarnet
- Mellem muntre musikanter (1923) - Fyrtaarnet
- Lille Lise let-paa-taa (1923) - Fyrtaarnet
- Blandt byens børn (1923) - Fyrtaarnet
- Professor Petersens Plejebørn (1924) - Long
- Raske Riviera Rejsende (1924) - Fy
- Ole Opfinders offer (1924) - Fyrtaarnet
- The Last Laugh (1924) - Wedding Musician (uncredited)
- Takt, tone og tosser (1925) - Fy
- Polis Paulus' påskasmäll (1925) - Lunken
- Vagabonder i Wien (1925)
- Grønkøbings glade gavtyve (1925) - Fy
- Ulvejægerne (1926) - Fy
- Dødsbokseren (1926) - Fy
- Sons in Law (1926)
- Ebberöds bank (1926) - Tadeus, Bankangestellter
- Lykkehjulet (1926) - Fy
- Don Quixote (1926) - Don Quixote
- Kraft og skønhed (1927) - Fy
- Vester Vov-Vov (1927) - Fy
- Tordenstenene (1927) - Fy
- Kongen af Pelikanien (1928) - Fy
- Filmens helte (1928) - Fyrtaarnet 'Paf'
- Cocktails (1928) - Gin
- Kys, klap og kommers (1929) - Fyr
- Hallo! Afrika forude! (1929) - Fyrtaarnet
- Alf's Carpet (1929) - Bill
- Højt paa en kvist (1929) - Fyrtaarnet
- Hr. Tell og Søn (1930) - Fyrtaarnet
- A Thousand Words of German (1930) - Fy
- Pas paa pigerne' (1930) - Fy
- I kantonnement (1931) - Fyrtaarnet
- Krudt med knald (1931) - Fy
- Lumpenkavaliere (1932) - Pat
- Han, hun og Hamlet (1932) - Fyrtaarnet
- Med fuld musik (1933) - Fyrtaarnet
- Circus Saran (1935) - Clown
- Mädchenräuber (1936) - Pat
- Blinde Passagiere (1936) - Pat, blinder Passagier
- The Pale Count (1937) - Fyrtornet
- Pat und Patachon im Paradies (1937) - Pat
- Midt i byens hjerte (1938)
- I de gode, gamle dage (1940) - Fyrtaarnet / Pat (final film role)
