= Growth of the Soil (2026 film) =

2026 Norwegian romantic drama film

- Theatrical release poster
- Norwegian: Markens Grøde
- Directed by: Hans Petter Moland
- Written by: Hans Petter Moland; Gard B. Eidsvold
- Based on: Growth of the Soil by Knut Hamsun
- Produced by: Håkon Øverås
- Starring: Herbert Nordrum; Asta Kamma August
- Cinematography: Oskar Dahlsbakken
- Edited by: Linda Man
- Music by: Kaspar Kaae
- Production company: 4½
- Release dates: 12 September 2026 (TIFF); 28 October 2026 (Norway)
- Running time: 155 minutes
- Country: Norway
- Language: Norwegian

Growth of the Soil (Norwegian: Markens Grøde) is a 2026 epic romantic drama film directed by Hans Petter Moland, co-written with Gard B. Eidsvold and based on the 1917 novel by Knut Hamsun. It stars Herbert Nordrum, Asta Kamma August, Eidsvold, Anders Baasmo, Oddgeir Thune, and Sjur Vatne Brean.

The film had its world premiere in the Special Presentations section of the 2026 Toronto International Film Festival on 12 September, and it will be theatrically released in Norway on 28 October. It was also selected as the Norwegian entry for Best International Feature Film at the 99th Academy Awards.

== Premise ==
A farmer seeks to build a life and start a family in the remote Norwegian wilderness.

== Cast ==
- Herbert Nordrum as Isak
- Asta Kamma August as Inger
- Gard B. Eidsvold
- Anders Baasmo
- Oddgeir Thune
- Sjur Vatne Brean

== Production ==
In October 2023, it was reported that Hans Petter Moland would adapt Knut Hamsun's 1917 novel Growth of the Soil. In November 2023, the project received a €1,500,000 production grant from the Norwegian Film Institute. The project was presented at the 2024 Nordic Film Market, held during the Gothenburg Film Festival.

Principal photography took place on location in Norway from June to December 2025.

== Release ==
Growth of the Soil had its world premiere at the Special Presentations section of the 2026 Toronto International Film Festival on 12 September. It was also programmed in the main competition of the 74th San Sebastián International Film Festival. Prior to its premiere, Beta Cinema had acquired the film's international sales rights. The film will be released in Norwegian theatres on 28 October 2026.

== Reception ==
Guy Lodge of Variety deemed the film to be "stately and pleasingly old-fashioned", feeling like the kind of film that Bille August "might have made in his heyday".

== Accolades ==
Year	Award	Category	Nominee(s)	Result	Ref.
2026	74th San Sebastián International Film Festival	Silver Shell for Best Leading Performance	Asta Kamma August	Won	
2026	74th San Sebastián International Film Festival	Jury Prize for Best Cinematography	Oskar Dahlsbakken	Won	

== See also ==
- Growth of the Soil (1921 film)
- List of submissions to the 99th Academy Awards for Best International Feature Film
- List of Norwegian submissions for the Academy Award for Best International Feature Film
- List of Nordic Academy Award winners and nominees
