= Harald Madsen =

Danish actor (1890–1949)

Harald Martin Bergmann Madsen
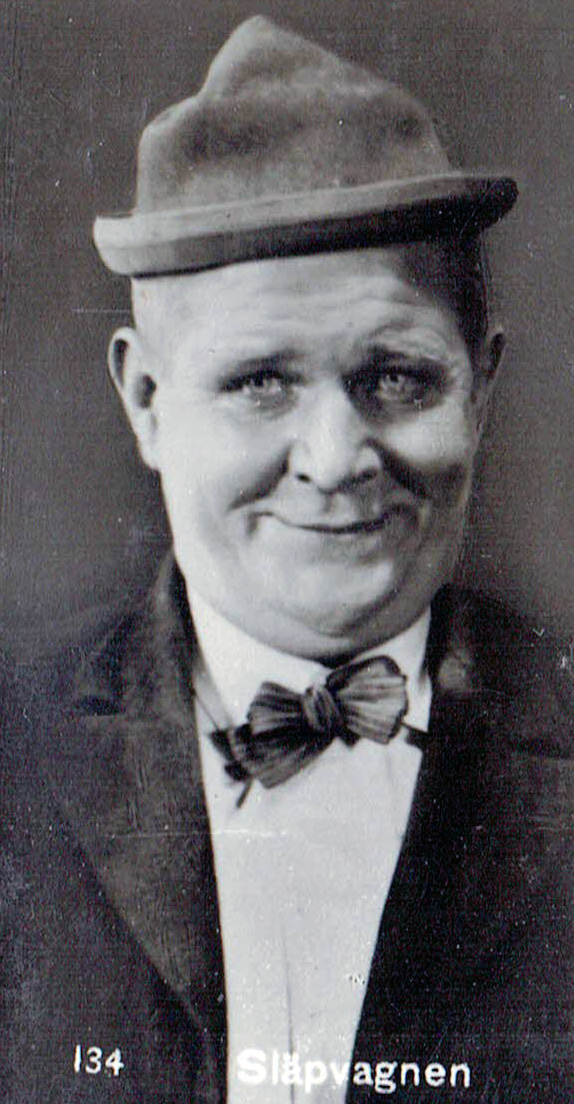
- Madsen in the 1930s
- Born: 20 November 1890; Silkeborg, Denmark
- Died: 13 July 1949 (aged 58); Usseroed, Denmark
- Occupation: Actor
- Years active: 1917-1948

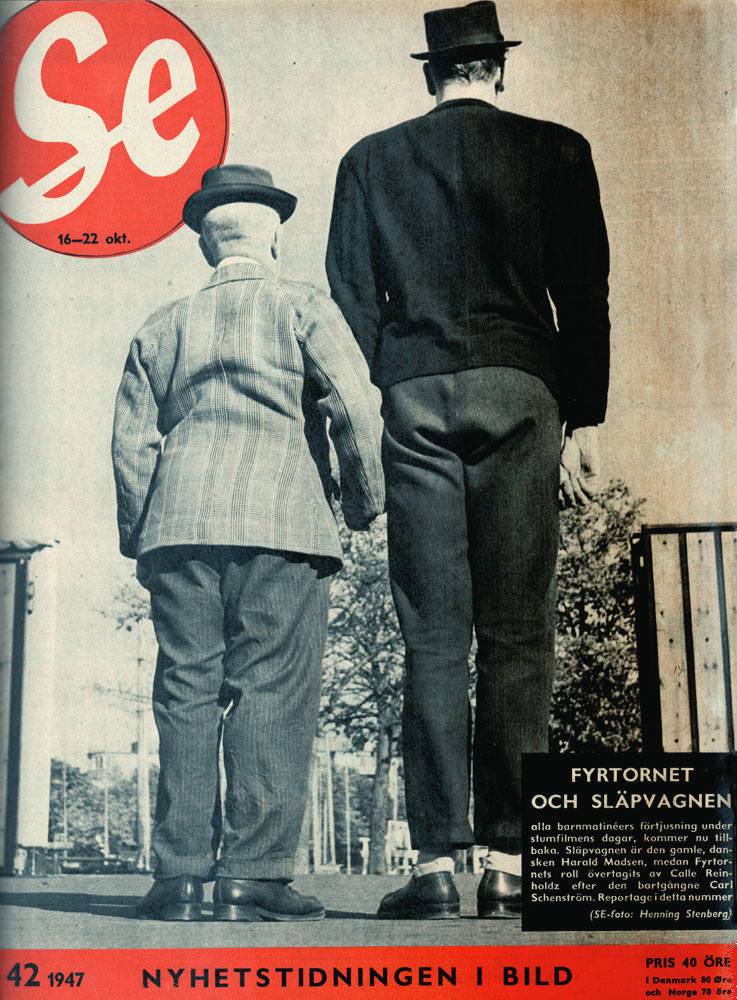
Fy og Bi in the magazine Se, 1947

Harald Martin Bergmann Madsen (20 November 1890 – 13 July 1949) was a Danish film actor. He appeared in 51 films between 1917 and 1948. Harald Madsen was a part of the Danish comedian couple Fyrtårnet og Bivognen (Fy og Bi), known as "Long & Short" in the United Kingdom and "Ole & Axel" in the United States, alongside his partner Carl Schenstrøm (Fy).

He was born in Silkeborg, Denmark and died in Usseroed, Denmark.

== Selected filmography ==
- Sons in Law (1926)
- Cocktails (1928)
- Alf's Carpet (1929)
- Højt paa en kvist (1929)
- A Thousand Words of German (1930)
- I kantonnement (1932)
- Han, hun og Hamlet (1932)
- Circus Saran (1935)
- The Pale Count (1937)
- I de gode, gamle dage (1940)
