= Gunnar Sommerfeldt =

Danish actor and filmmaker (1890–1947)

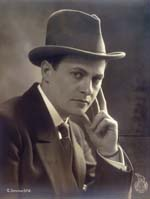
- Born: 4 September 1890
- Died: 30 August 1947 (aged 56)

Gunnar Sommerfeldt (4 September 1890 – 30 August 1947) was a Danish actor and filmmaker. In 1919 he directed Saga Borgarættarinnar, which was released in 1920 and was the first feature film shot in Iceland. Sommerfeldt also wrote the script, based on Gunnar Gunnarsson's novel by that name. He made his last feature film in 1921, an adaption of Knut Hamsun's Growth of the Soil, which received the Nobel Prize in Literature the year before.

== Filmography ==
=== Actor ===
- Kærlighed og Mobilisering (1915) - Grev Heinrich von Borgh
- Nattens gaade (1915)
- Fyrstindens skæbne - Alf Hardy (1916)
- Lotteriseddel No. 22152 - Belling, Detective (1916)
- Pro Patria (1916)
- Hotel Paradis (1917)
- Synd skal sones (1917)
- Gillekop (1919)
- Rytterstatuen - Baron v. Nobel (1919)
- Borgslægtens historie - Ketill aka Gæst (1920) (Iceland)
- Growth of the Soil - Geissler, lensmannen (1921)
- Lykkens galoscher (1921)

=== Director ===
- Lykkens Pamfilius (1917)
- Borgslægtens historie (1920)
- Growth of the Soil (1921)
- Lykkens galoscher (1921)

=== Writer ===
- Growth of the Soil (1921)
- Lykkens galoscher (1921)
