= Frederik Buch =

Danish actor

- Buch in the 1910s
- Born: 8 December 1875; Denmark
- Died: 13 April 1925 (aged 49)

Frederik Buch (8 December 1875 – 13 April 1925) was a Danish film actor of the silent era in Denmark. He starred in over 100 films, and prolifically worked under Lau Lauritzen Sr. for thirty years.

== Filmography ==
- His New Grey Trousers (1915)
- En slem Dreng (1915)
- De besejrede Pebersvende (1914)
