= Ole & Axel =

Danish comedic duo (1921–1940)

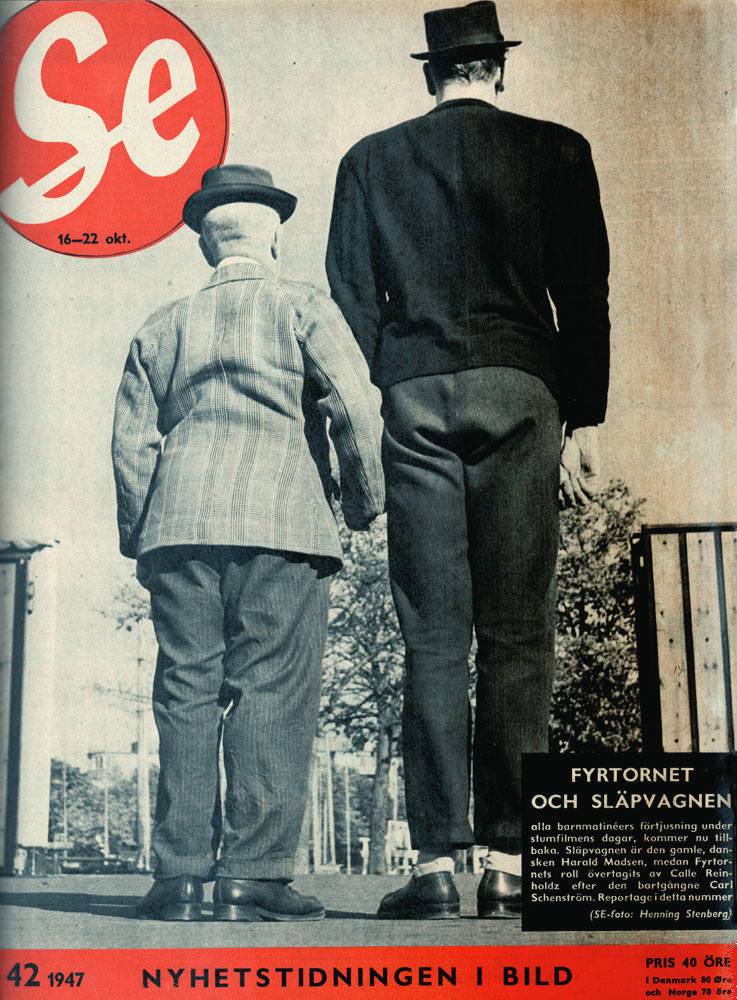
Ole & Axel on the front page of the Swedish weekly magazine Se in 1947. The roles here were played by Harald Madsen and Calle Reinholdz (who succeeded Carl Schenstrøm).

Ole & Axel (American) or Long & Short (British) were a pair of comics from Denmark, known in Danish as Fyrtårnet og Bivognen (Lighthouse and Sidecar), often called Fy og Bi for short. The pair were played by Carl Schenstrøm (1881–1942) and Harald Madsen (1890–1949).

The duo debuted in 1921 with the film Film, Flirt og Forlovelse (Film, Flirt, and Fiancées), and they appeared until 1940 in about 50 comedies, mostly silent films. Of these, 13 were made outside Denmark (in Sweden, Germany, Austria, and England). Their heyday was in the 1920s, when Ole & Axel were Danish cinematography's major export product and the world's first internationally renowned film comedy double act.

Ole & Axel were known as Telegrafstolpen og Tilhengeren in Norway, Fyrtornet och Släpvagnen in Sweden, Majakka ja Perävaunu (The Lighthouse and the Trailer) in Finland, Doublepatte et Patachon in France, Watt en Halfwatt in the Netherlands, and Long & Short in England. Relatively few of their films were screened in the United States. In other countries the duo was known by their German name, Pat und Patachon.

In the 1950s, the rights owners created a number of feature films by combining several short films. These versions were again cut into serials (with 59 episodes) by Federal German television ZDF from 1968 to 1970. Humorist Hanns Dieter Hüsch provided the narration and all other voices. This version kept Pat und Patachon well known in Germany due to numerous reruns.

Clip of Ole & Axel and their Danish traveling companions during a visit to Amsterdam in 1924
