= Lau Lauritzen Sr. =

Danish film director (1878–1938)

Lauritz Lauritzen
- Born: 13 March 1878; Silkeborg, Denmark
- Died: 2 July 1938 (aged 60)
- Occupations: Film director, screenwriter, actor of the silent era
- Children: Lau Lauritzen Jr.

Lau Lauritzen Sr., born Lauritz Lauritzen (13 March 1878, in Silkeborg – 2 July 1938) was an early Danish film director, screenwriter and actor of the silent era in Denmark. His son, Lau Lauritzen Jr. became one of Denmark's leading directors in the 1940s and 1950s.

== Filmography ==
=== As an actor ===
- Den farlige alder (1911)
- Christian Schrøder i Panoptikon (1911)
- Vildledt Elskov (1911)
- Kun en Tigger (1912)
- Den svundne lykke (1912)
- Atlantis (1913)
- Kærlighed gør stærk (1913)
- Chatollets hemmelighed (1913)
- Fra fyrste til knejpevært (1913)
- Grev Dahlborgs hemmelighed (1914)
- Det sidste møde (1914)
- Balleteusens hævn (1914)
- Inderpigen (1914)
- Grev Zarkas bande (1914)
- Midnatssolen (1916)
- Gadeoriginalen
- Frelserpigen
- Knap og Hægte
- Den bortførte Brud

=== As a director ===
- Den kulørte Slavehandler (1914)
- De besejrede Pebersvende (1914)
- Herberg for Hjemløse (1914) - directorial debut
- En slem Dreng (1915)
- Kærlighed og Mobilisering (1915)
- Kong Bukseløs (1915)
- Familien Pille som Spejdere (1915)
- Carl Alstrup og hans Tvillingebro'r (1915)
- Held i Uheld (1915)
- En søvnig Brudgom (1915)
- Uniformens Magt (1915)
- De Nygifte (1915)
- Hans Kusine (1915)
- En Kone søges (1915)
- En Vandgang (1915)
- Kærlighed pr. Flytteomnibus (1915)
- Cowboymillionæren (1915)
- To Mand frem for en Enke (1915)
- Helten fra Østafrika (1915)
- Hjertefejlen (1915)
- Tyvepak (1915)
- Den gale Digter (1915)
- Susanne paa Eventyr (1915)
- Tre om Een (1915)
- Carl Alstrups Kærlighed paa Aktier (1915)
- En virkelig Helt (1915)
- Susanne i Badet (1915)
- Oldtid og Nutid (1915)
- Lige for lige (1915)
- Flyttedags-Kvaler (1915)
- En moderne Don Juan (1915)
- Gammel Ost og Blomsterduft (1916)
- En bevæget Nat (1916)
- En skindød Ægtemand (1916)
- Hønseministerens Besøg (1916)
- Det bertillonske System (1916)
- En dejlig Dag (1916)
- Studentens glade Liv (1916)
- En nydelig Onkel (1916)
- Sommer-Kærlighed (1916)
- Arvetanten (1916)
- En uheldig Skygge (1916)
- Den forrykte Komponist (1916)
- Min Onkel Generalkonsulen (1916)
- Skinsyge-Digteren (1916)
- En munter Klinik (1916)
- En landlig Uskyldighed (1916)
- Den værdifulde Husassistent (1916)
- Gullasch Grossererens Vogter (1916)
- En sød Logerende (1916)
- Den flyvende Kuffert (1916)
- En nobel Fødselsdagsgave (1916)
- Det gaadefulde Væsen
- Konfetti (1916)
- Eventyr paa Fodrejsen (1916)
- I tjenstligt Øjemed (1916)
- Den livstrætte Theodor (1916)
- Kærlighed og Spøgelser (1916)
- Don Juans Overmand (1916)
- Paraplyen (1916)
- Min Svigerinde fra Amerika (1917)
- De tossede Kvindfolk (1917)
- Diskenspringeren (1917)
- Et livligt Pensionat (1917)
- Je' sku' tale me' Jør'nsen (1917)
- Ridderen af den bedrøvelige Skikkelse (1917)
- Den forfulgte Brudgom (1917)
- Et fremmeligt Barn (1917)
- Professorens dyrebare Krukke (1917)
- Ung og forelsket (1917)
- Den glemsomme Professor (1917)
- Abemennesket (1917)
- De forheksede Støvler (1917)
- Hyrdepigens Kærlighed (1917)
- Gentleman for en Time (1917)
- Den megen Kærlighed (1917)
- Sufflørens Stedfortræder (1917)
- En hyggelig Morgenudflugt (1917)
- Askepot (1917)
- Den ny Kokkepige (1917)
- Dydsdragonen (1918)
- Pigespejderen (1918)
- Ung Pige i Huset (1918)
- Hun skriver paa Maskine (1918)
- Naar Ungdommen raser (1918)
- Hjerterkonge (1918)
- Hjertebetvingeren (1918)
- Ned med Kærligheden (1918)
- Tøffelheltens Fødselsdag (1918)
- Bunkebryllup (1918)
- Hendes stille Sværmeri (1918)
- Naar man er ung og forelsket (1918)
- En uheldig Tyveknægt (1918)
- Kærlighedsspekulanten (1918)
- Damernes Ridder (1918)
- Ægteskabshaderne (1918)
- Han er løbet med min Kone (1918)
- Jalousiens Magt (1918)
- Kærlighed og Pædagogik (1918)
- Mirakeltjeneren (1918)
- Hatten med skatten (1918)
- Brændt a' (1919)
- Det lille Pus (1919)
- Agentens Tvillinger (1919)
- Hans Kones Veninde (1919)
- Bægersvingeren (1919)
- Byens Herkules (1919)
- Nellys Riddere (1919)
- Boksernes Konge (1919)
- Den store Gevinst (1919)
- Fugleskræmslet (1919)
- Med og uden Kone (1919)
- Godsejeren (1919)
- Mesterdetektiverne (1919)
- Nalles Børnehave (1919)
- Maharajaens Yndlingsflamme (1919)
- En forfløjen Ægtemand (1919)
- Lotterisedlen (1919)
- Den Sømand han maa lide (1919)
- Skørtejægeren (1919)
- Har været med et Brev i Postkassen (1919)
- Studentmagersvenden (1919)
- Han vil til Filmen (1919)
- De er splittergale (1919)
- Den skønne Ubekendt instruktøre (1919)
- Han skal duellere (1919)
- Har De ikke set Cecilie? (1919)
- Mandens Overmand (1919)
- Klavervirtuosen (1919)
- Skandalemageren (1919)
- Kærlighed og Kontanter (1919)
- Hjertetyven (1919)
- Mesterhypnotisøren (1919)
- En hustru till låns (SE, 1920)
- En Sølvbryllupsdag (1920)
- Væddeløberen (1920)
- De keder sig paa Landet (1920)
- Evas Forlovelse (1920)
- De Nygifte (1920)
- Frøken Larsens Karriere (1920)
- Den tapre Skrædder (1920)
- Den standhaftige Spillemand (1920)
- Hans bedre Halvdel (1920)
- Den lille Don Juan (1920)
- Hun fik ham ikke (1920)
- Kærlighed og Overtro (1920)
- En Fiasko (1920)
- Den forvandlede Don Juan (1920)
- Den fattige Millionær (1920)
- Film, Flirt og Forlovelse (1921) - the first Fy & Bi film
- Den kære Husfred (1921)
- Silkesstrumpan (SE, 1921)
- Rejsen til Maanen (1921)
- Skaf mig en Kæreste (1921)
- Ungkarleliv (1921)
- De livlige Statuer (1921)
- Metode i Galskaben (1921)
- Harems-Mystik (1921)
- Kæledæggen (1921)
- Hans Ungdomsbrud (1921)
- Amatørdetektiven (1921)
- Kærlighed og Fuglekvidder (1921)
- Kärlek och hypnotism (SE, 1921)
- Harestegen (1921)
- Han er Mormon (1922)
- Hans Kones Mand (1922)
- Sol, Sommer og Studiner (1922)
- Blandt Byens Børn (1923)
- Daarskab, Dyd og Driverter (1923)
- Grønkøbings glade Gavtyve (1925)
- Takt, Tone og Tosser (1925)
- Ulvejægerne (1926)
- Dødsbokseren (1926)
- Don Quixote (1926) - Lauritzen's most ambitious film shot during 8 months in Spain
- Filmens Helte (1928)
- Kys, Klap og Kommers (1929)
- Krudt med Knald (1931)
- Københavnere (1933)
- Barken Margrethe (1934)
- Giftes - nej Tak! (1936)
