= Carl Viggo Meincke =

Danish actor and composer (1902–1959)

- Born: Fritz Carl Viggo Meincke; 8 March 1902; Copenhagen, Denmark
- Died: 27 September 1959 (aged 57); Copenhagen, Denmark
- Burial place: Vestre Cemetery, Copenhagen; 55°39′28″N 12°31′45″E
- Occupations: Actor; Composer

Fritz Carl Viggo Meincke (8 March 1902 – 27 September 1959) was a Danish composer, revue author, theater manager and actor.

== Early years ==
Carl Meincke was born on 8 March 1902 on Frederiksborggade 5, Copenhagen, in the parish Trinitatis. He was the biological son of oil trader Carl Christian Viktor Bang Rasmussen (born 28 October 1861 in Fredensborg) and his wife Olga Johanne (née Christensen, born 12 December 1873 in Copenhagen). His biological parents were married on 2 April 1892 in Frederiksberg Kirke.

Meincke was adopted by wholesale trader Carl Vilhelm Harald Viggo Meincke (born 30 July 1860 in Copenhagen) and his wife Regina Augustine Christensine (née Olsen born 15 July 1876 in Helsingør) and baptized on 29 June 1902 in Vor Frue Kirke, Copenhagen by Rev. Hoffmeyer. For several years, the family lived on Studiestræde 34, Copenhagen.

By 1916, the family had moved to Gentofte (Jernbanevej 3), where Carl was confirmed on 1 October 1916. He graduated in 1919 from Sankt Andreas Kollegiet in Ordrup (near Charlottenlund). Carl grew up as an only child.

== Personal life ==
In the 1930s, Meincke married a woman called Dolly Helstrup, a Danish revue and theater actress. After World War II, Meincke lived together with the pianist and composer Hans Ole Nielsen, with whom he also worked on various projects. When Meincke died in 1959, Nielsen was his sole inheritor.

The occupation of Denmark (9 April 1940 – 5 May 1945) had a great influence on Meincke’s life. He joined the Danish Nazi Party (DNSAP) on 14 October 1940, openly declaring his views. During the occupation, Meincke worked on revues and plays that were sympathetic towards the occupying Nazis. When the occupation ended, Meincke was punished for his collaboration, and was expelled from all possible organizations.

== Career ==
From 1917 and into the 1920s, Meincke participated in the local revue in Gentofte as a text writer. He debuted at age 17 (circa 1919) with song texts for the summer theater in Stege (Danish: Stege Sommerteater). For some years, Meincke was also director for the theater Over Stalden in Charlottenlund, and Fønix Teatret, where he at times also came on stage.

Ludvig Brandstrup started a revue group called Co-optimisterne in 1925, and it was soon joined by several prominent Danes, among these Meincke. The group performed in yellow clown costumes and entertained with satirical and humorous songs and sketches, and was disbanded in the early 1930s. Some famous members include:

- Ann-Sofie Norén
- Christian Gottschalch
- Susanne Palsbo
- Mogens Dam (author)
- Kai Normann Andersen (composer)
- Sigurd Langberg
- Peter Malberg
- Robert Storm Petersen
- Agnes Rehni
- Osvald Helmuth

During the German occupation, Meincke became enemies with his audience and many of his colleagues due to his political views. He participated in a German-friendly revue, and he complained to the German censorship over being made fun of in a song by Poul Henningsen. After the war ended, Meincke was isolated, an isolation which was only broken at the celebration of his 40 year anniversary as a writer.

== Death ==
Carl Viggo Meincke died on 27 September 1959 and was buried in Vestre Kirkegård in Copenhagen.

== Work ==
=== Acted in the following movies ===
- Snushanerne (1935) – as a musical furniture remover
- Panserbasse (1936) – as a yard singer
- Plat eller krone (1937)
- En lille tilfældighed (1939)
- Jeg har elsket og levet (1940) – as Kofoed, a student
- En mand af betydning (1941) - as Nielsen, a painter
- Thummelumsen (1941) - as Consul Eriksen

=== Song texts for the following movies ===
- Copenhagenere (1933)
- Med fuld musik (1933)
- Bag Copenhagens kulisser (1935)
- Week-End (1935)
- De bør forelske Dem (1935)
- Kidnapped (1935)
- Snushanerne (1935)
- Panserbasse (1936)
- Sol over Danmark (1936)
- En fuldendt gentleman (1937) – also worked on manuscript
- Flådens blå matroser (1937)
- Frk. Møllers Jubilæum (1937)
- Plat eller krone (1937)
- En lille tilfældighed (1939)
- Familien Olsen (1940

=== Other songs ===
- Gem du dine kys til det bliver forår
- Alle fugle fløjter på en sang om kærlighed - Victor Cornelius/C.V. Meincke
- Man bli'r så glad, når solen skinner (1939) - Kai Normann Andersen/C.V. Meincke
- Der går altid både tilbage
- Hvem kan sejle foruden vind – Swedish folk melody/C.V. Meincke
- Hvorfor er lykken så lunefuld (1937) - Kevin/Jönsson/C.V. Meincke
- Ih hvor er det kommunalt
- Jeg kan ikke gøre for det, men jeg kan så godt li' pi'er
- Julia, Julia
- Copenhagen, Copenhagen - Victor Cornelius/C.V. Meincke
- Nu skal vi ud at slå til Søren
- Når lygterne tændes - Kennedy/Williams/C.V. Meincke
- Mit Lille Private Højskolehjem (1942 fra Helsingørrevyen) - C.V. Meincke/Willy Kierulff
- Alt hvad der er værd at få (1959) - Inger Christrup/C.V. Meincke/Emilie Noller
