= Karen Jønsson =

Danish actress

- Born: 17 January 1909; Denmark
- Died: 2 December 1942 (aged 33)

Karen Jønsson (or Jönsson ) born Karen Sylvia Therese Pedersen (17 January 1909 – 2 December 1942) was a Danish actress of Swedish descent. She was also a notable, gifted and popular singer, songwriter and composer. Throughout the 1930s she composed and recorded a number of catchy tunes and songs, often centered on her voice and refined stride-like piano playing, of which well over a handful still retain a certain recognition and popularity as evergreens, such as Hvorfor er Lykken så lunefuld, I Aften, Han kommer og banker, Din Melodi and Would You Miss One Little Kiss. She also composed several filmscores, as well as a jazz rhapsody which was well received in Britain, all in between touring with her music and appearances on screen.

She died at the age of 33. According to some sources the cause of death was pneumonia (at that time still a serious disease before the emergence of penicillin), while others claim, it was an overdose of sleeping pills, and a possible suicide.

== Filmography ==
- Frøken Møllers jubilæum – 1937
- En fuldendt gentleman – 1937
- Alarm – 1938
- I dag begynder livet – 1939
