= Panserbasse =

1936 film

- Front cover of the Danish VHS video
- Directed by: Lau Lauritzen Jr. Alice O'Fredericks
- Written by: Lau Lauritzen Jr. Alice O'Fredericks
- Starring: Ib Schønberg
- Cinematography: Carlo Bentsen
- Edited by: Edith Schlüssel
- Music by: Victor Cornelius
- Release date: 1 October 1936
- Running time: 99 minutes
- Country: Denmark
- Language: Danish

Panserbasse is a 1936 Danish film directed by Lau Lauritzen Jr. and Alice O'Fredericks.

== Cast ==
- Knud Almar
- Carl Carlsen
- Victor Cornelius
- Carl Fischer
- Aage Fønss
- Ingeborg Gandrup
- Ellen Jansø
- Arthur Jensen
- Gunnar Lauring as Slubberten
- Lau Lauritzen Jr.
- Albert Luther
- Karen Lykkehus
- Connie Meiling as Lille Connie
- Carl Viggo Meincke
- Carola Merrild
- Poul Reichhardt as Mekanikeren
- Ib Schønberg as Gadebetjent Peter Basse
- Lis Smed
- Erika Voigt
