= Marie Ejlersen =

Danish film editor

- Born: 1 August 1892; Denmark
- Died: Unknown
- Occupation: Film editor
- Years active: 1937–1950

Marie Ejlersen was a Danish film editor active in the 1930s, 1940s, and 1950s. She was the editor on many of directors Alice O'Fredericks and Lau Lauritzen.

== Selected filmography ==
- Mosekongen (1950)
- Cafe Paradise (1950)
- Den opvakte jomfru (1950)
- Min kone er uskyldig (1950)
- The Red Horses (1950)
- We Want a Child! (1949)
- Hr. Petit (1948)
- The Viking Watch of the Danish Seaman (1948)
- Lise kommer til Byen (1947)
- I Love You Karlsson (1947)
- The Swedenhielm Family (1947)
- Naar Katten er ude (1947)
- I Love Another (1946)
- We Meet at Tove's (1946)
- Red Meadows (1945)
- De kloge og vi gale (1945)
- Panik i familien (1945)
- Affæren Birte (1945)
- Bedstemor går amok (1944)
- Elly Petersen (1944)
- Teatertosset (1944)
- Hans Onsdagsveninde (1943)
- Det brændende Spørgsmaal (1943)
- Tyrannens Fald (1942)
- Frk. Vildkat (1942)
- Derailed (1942)
- Tag til Rønneby Kro (1941)
- Far skal giftes (1941)
- Tror du jeg er født i Gaar! (1941)
- En ganske almindelig pige (1940)
- Pas på Svinget i Solby (1940)
- Familien Olsen (1940)
- I dag begynder livet (1939)
- Nordhavets mænd (1939)
- De tre måske fire (1939)
- Blaavand melder Storm (1938)
- Livet paa Hegnsgaard (1938)
- Der var engang en Vicevært (1937)
- Frk. Møllers jubilæum (1937)
- En fuldendt gentleman (1937)
