= Ingeborg Pehrson =

Danish actress

- Born: Ingeborg Pouline Pehrson; 16 December 1886
- Died: 11 April 1950 (aged 63)
- Other name: Ingeborg Pouline Christiansen

Ingeborg Pehrson (16 December 1886 – 11 April 1950) was a Danish stage and film actress.

== Selected filmography ==
- Elverhøj - 1917
- Den sidste af Slægten - 1922
- En Nat i København - 1924
- Lille Dorrit - 1924
- Københavnere - 1933
- Flight from the Millions - 1934
- Week-End - 1935
- Min kone er husar - 1935
- De bør forelske Dem - 1935
- Flådens blå matroser - 1937
- Der var engang en vicevært - 1937
- Plat eller krone - 1937
- Bolettes brudefærd - 1938
- Under byens tage - 1938
- Nordhavets mænd - 1939
- Pas på svinget i Solby - 1940
- Familien Olsen - 19
- Sommerglæder - 1940
- En pige med pep - 1940
- Niels Pind og hans dreng - 1941
- En søndag på Amager - 1941
- Søren Søndervold - 1942
- Ta' briller på - 1942
- Tordenskjold går i land - 1942
- Frøken Vildkat - 1942
- Et skud før midnat - 1942
- Ebberød Bank - 1943
- Hans onsdagsveninde - 1943
- Kriminalassistent Bloch - 1943
- Mordets melodi - 1944
- Teatertosset - 1944
- Familien Gelinde - 1944
- Det bødes der for - 1944
- Biskoppen - 1944
- Man elsker kun een gang - 1945
- Jeg elsker en anden - 1946
- Billet mrk. - 1946
- Op med lille Martha - 1946
- Sikken en nat - 1947
- Tre år efter - 1948
- Min kone er uskyldig - 1950
