= I Love You Karlsson =

1947 film

- Directed by: Lau Lauritzen; John Zacharias
- Written by: Grete Frische; Gösta Stevens
- Produced by: Inge Ivarson
- Starring: Marguerite Viby; Sture Lagerwall; Olof Winnerstrand
- Cinematography: Rudolf Frederiksen
- Edited by: Marie Ejlersen
- Music by: Sven Gyldmark
- Production company: Kungsfilm
- Distributed by: Kungsfilm
- Release date: 13 September 1947
- Running time: 86 minutes
- Country: Sweden
- Language: Swedish

I Love You Karlsson (Swedish: Jag älskar dig, Karlsson!) is a 1947 Swedish comedy film directed by Lau Lauritzen and John Zacharias and starring Marguerite Viby, Sture Lagerwall and Olof Winnerstrand. It was shot at the ASA Film Studios at Lyngby in Copenhagen and on location in Stockholm. It was a remake of the 1946 Danish film I Love Another.

== Synopsis ==
Marie enjoys working at her nursery but is shocked to discover that the owner of its site has sold the house and the new owner wishes to close the school. She sets out to change the mind of Connie, who just inherited the property, and discovers help from an unexpected direction.

== Cast ==
- Marguerite Viby as Marie Hagberg
- Sture Lagerwall as John Sylvander
- Olof Winnerstrand as Kalle
- Ib Schønberg as Johansen
- Lillebil Kjellén as Connie Schmidt
- Viveca Serlachius as Elsa
- Curt Masreliez as Torsten
- Astrid Bodin as Karin
- Linnéa Hillberg as Daghemsföreståndarinnan
- Solveig Lagström as Tora
- Jullan Kindahl as Hulda
- Lau Lauritzen as Karlsson
- Kaj Hjelm as Springpojken
- Magnus Kesster as Taxichauffören
- Ingrid Luterkort as Kvinna
- Hanny Schedin as Kvinna
- Ruth Weijden as Connies husjungfru
- John Zacharias as Arkitekten
- Georg Årlin as Karlsson senior

== Bibliography ==
- Krawc, Alfred. International Directory of Cinematographers, Set- and Costume Designers in Film: Denmark, Finland, Norway, Sweden (from the beginnings to 1984). Saur, 1986.
