= Olivo =

Olivo is both a Spanish, Italian, and French surname and a masculine given name, and it referred to someone who grew olives. Notable people with the name include:

Surname:

- America Olivo (born 1978), American actress and singer
- Brock Olivo (born 1976), American football player
- Chi-Chi Olivo (1928–1977), Dominican Republic baseball player
- Daniel Olivo (born 1989), American businessman and healthcare professional
- Diomedes Olivo (1919–1977), Dominican Republic baseball player
- Dora Olivo (born 1943), American politician
- Frank Olivo, American politician
- Horacio Olivo, Puerto Rican actor and comedian
- Karen Olivo (born 1976), American actress
- Miguel Olivo (born 1978), Dominican Republic baseball player
- Raúl Olivo, Venezuelan actor
- Renzo Olivo (born 1992), Argentine tennis player
- Roberto Olivo (1914–2005), Venezuelan professional baseball umpire
- Rosario Olivo (born 1940), Italian politician

Given name:

- Olivo Barbieri (born 1954), Italian artist and photographer
- Olivo Krause (1857–1927), Danish oboist and composer
- Oscar Olivo (born 1981), American actor

== See also ==
- Olivo (Mexico City Metrobús), a BRT station in Mexico City
- Olivos (disambiguation)
