= Marguerite Viby =

Danish actress

- Promotional Photo of Marguerite Viby
- Born: Ida Marguerite Steenberg Jensen Viby; 25 June 1909; Copenhagen, Denmark
- Died: 8 April 2001 (aged 91); Frederiksberg, Denmark
- Years active: 1929–1985

Marguerite Viby (25 June 1909 – 8 April 2001) was a Danish actress of stage, film and television. Considered one of the great comedy actresses of Danish cinema, Viby received honorary Bodil and Robert Awards in 2000 for lifetime achievement. She appeared in more than 50 films and television shows during a career that spanned from the silent film era in 1929 until a television series in 1983.

== Career ==
Marguerite Viby was born Ida Marguerite Steenberg Jensen Viby in Copenhagen, Denmark on 25 June 1909, the daughter of a policeman and a secretary. Her father died when she was 16 and her mother a year later. Viby had left school at 14 and was working part-time to pay for dance lessons. She was schooled as a dancer at Emilie Walbom's Ballet School as well as through private instruction from the Danish Royal Dancer John Andersen. In 1923, 14-year-old Viby debuted in a summer revue at Tivoli Gardens. She continued to perform in revues and stage musicals throughout her life.

In 1929, Viby began her film career in the silent film Højt på en kvist (High on in the Attic). She followed with four “Fy og Bi” comedy films, being cast mostly for her physical attraction. However in her final Fy og Bi film, He, She and Hamlet (1932), the first Danish combined sound film, Viby danced and sang a romantic duet with leading man Hans W. Petersen.

According to Danish film historian Morten Piil, it was Viby's next role which established her most noted persona: the energetic, witty woman who acts however is necessary to maneuver in a man's world. In this 1932 George Schnéevoigt film Tretten År (13 Years), Viby was an office girl who plays a thirteen-year-old Lolita to avoid men's advances. Piil wrote that it was only Viby's "fundamental cheerful innocence which saved this erotic farce..."

Viby made her next nine films under the direction of her second husband, Emanuel Gregers. This included four films after they divorced in 1938, and she had married the actor Knud Wold. Her greatest success during this period was Mille, Marie og Mig (Mille, Marie and Me) in which Viby played a woman with three personalities—the prim, bespectacled student Klaus; the erotic nightclub singer Mille; and the homebody Marie. As Mille, in Marlene Dietrich-style men's clothing, Viby sings the popular Danish hit Jeg har elsket dig så længe jeg kan mindes (I Have Loved You as Long as I Can Remember).

In the early 1940s, Viby made two popular comedies with the directing duo of Alice O'Fredericks and Lau Lauritzen Jr. -- Frøken Kirkemus (Mrs. Churchmouse) and Frøken Vildkat (Mrs. Wildcat). The style of direction—quick light-hearted banter similar to American screw-ball comedies—was better suited to Viby than the heavier exposition of Gregers’ direction. She quickly became one of the most popular actresses and performed in a string of romantic comedies including Som du vil ha' mig-! (However You Will Have Me-!)(1943), Jeg elsker en anden (I Love Someone Else) (1946), and Den Store Gavtyv (1956).

During the period 1938-1956 she made over a dozen films in Sweden, including Swedish versions of some of her major Danish film successes. Also three films she first made in Swedish were made in Danish versions, Fröken Kyrkråtta (Mrs. Churchmouse (1941)), Fröken Vildkatt (Mrs. Wildcat (1942)) and Lyckan kommer (Happiness Comes (1942)).

In the 1970s and 80s, Viby continued her acting in television, including the continuing role of Olga Mortensen in the comedy series En Stor Familie (One Big Family). In 2000, Viby was presented with lifetime achievement awards at both the Bodil and Robert awards ceremonies. Viby died the following year on 8 April 2001 at the age of 91.

== Personal life ==
While her professional acting life was steady, her personal life was more volatile. Viby married five times. Her first marriage was to actor and dancer Poul Christian Guldager (1926–1931), then to Danish film director Emanuel Gregers (1932–1938). In 1938, Viby married businessman Knud Wold with whom she had her only child, the actress Susse Wold. During the early 1940s, Viby was linked with Prince Bertil of Sweden. In 1953, she married actor Preben Mahrt, and after they divorced, she was married to schoolteacher Erik Henry Tangfelt from 1967 until his sudden death at 48 in 1971.

I don't like the word 'girlfriends.' That's ladies with big hats who sit and drink tea and talk about irrelevant things. Naturally, I get together with women... but my acquaintances are mostly men. I feel best in the company of men.

— Marguerite Viby, 1968

== Filmography ==
- Højt paa en kvist – (1929)
- Pas paa pigerne (1930)
- Hr. Tell og søn (1930)
- Ve' den, der lyver (1930) ... a.k.a. Woe to Him who Lies
- Krudt med knald (1931)
- Han, hun og Hamlet – (1932) ... a.k.a. He, She and Hamlet
- Skal vi vædde en million? – 1932 ... a.k.a. Do You want to bet a Million?
- Tretten år – 1932
- Fem raske piger – 1933
- Så til søs – 1933
- Skaf en sensation – 1934
- Min kone er husar – 1935
- Cocktail – 1937
- Mille, Marie og mig – 1937
- Komtessen på Stenholt – 1939
- En pige med pep – 1940
- Sørensen og Rasmussen – 1940
- Frøken Kirkemus – 1941
- Lykken kommer – 1942
- Frøken Vildkat – 1942
- Op med humøret – 1943
- Som du vil ha' mig – 1943
- Dolly Takes a Chance – 1944
- Teatertosset – 1944
- Lilla helgonet – 1944
- Jeg elsker en anden – 1946
- Peggy on a Spree – 1946
- I Love You Karlsson (1947)
- Den opvakte jomfru – 1950
- Den store gavtyv – 1956
- Hvad vil De ha'? – 1956
- A Little Nest (1956)
- Pigen og vandpytten – 1958
- Mine tossede drenge – 1961
- Don Olsen kommer til byen – 1964
- Far laver sovsen – 1967
- Mordskab – (1969) ... a.k.a. The Busybody
- På'en igen Amalie – 1973

== Awards ==
- Johanne Luise Heiberg Memorial Grant
- Liva Weel Anniversary Grant
- Ole Haslund Artists Fund (1969)
- Frederiksberg Artist of the Year (1983)
- Clara Pontoppidans Fødseldaglegat (1987)
- Karl Gerhardts Hæderpris (1987)
- Bodil Award (2000)
- Robert Award (2000)
