= Osvald Helmuth =

Danish stage and film actor and revue singer

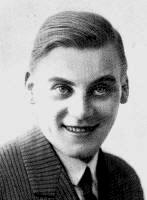
- Osvald Helmuth in 1919
- Born: 14 July 1894; Copenhagen, Denmark
- Died: 18 March 1966 (aged 71)

Osvald Helmuth (14 July 1894 – 18 March 1966) was a Danish stage and film actor and revue singer.

== Life and career ==
His career began in Randers in 1913, and he later appeared in the Nørrebro Teater in Copenhagen. In 1929 he got his big break with the revue song Ølhunden glammer by Poul Henningsen.

In 1936 he appeared in his first film, Cirkusrevyen, a musical comedy in which he displayed his singing talents, directed by acclaimed directors Lau Lauritzen, Jr. and Alice O'Fredericks. This paved the way for a successful film career in the 1930s and 1940s, successively appearing in leading roles in musical comedies directed by these people such as Der var engang en vicevært (1937), En fuldendt gentleman (1937) but also thrillers such as Blaavand melder storm (1938). After the family film Familien Olsen in 1940, Helmuth ended his duel partnership with Lauritzen Jr. and Fredericks and in 1941 played the leading role in Emanuel Gregers's En mand af betydning in which he starred alongside Inger Stender and Sigrid Horne-Rasmussen . Helmuth did however reconcile with Fredericks in 1947 in the comedy Stjerneskud, co-directed with Jon Iversen.

In 1960 he performed as a narrator in the short documentary film directed by Jørgen Roos, A City Called Copenhagen. The film was nominated for an Academy Award for Best Documentary Short.

Of his more serious roles are in Jeppe in Jeppe på bjerget, performed at the Det kongelige Teater in 1954, and Doolittle in My Fair Lady in 1960. On 21 March 1954 Osvald Helmuth appeared on Broadway in New York City with Victor Borge. Together with Poul Reumert he also sang a selection of "Gluntarne" duets.

Notable songs sung by Helmuth include Dit hjerte er i fare Andresen, Herlig en sommernat, 100 mand og en bajer and Bar' engang imellem.

He was award a Knight of the Dannebrog in 1953 and during his 50-year anniversary in 1963, he was elevated to Knight of the 1st Degree.

In 1961 he starred as an authority figure in the film, The Boy Who Loved Horses.

Helmuth's last film appearance was shortly before his death in Henning Carlsen's Hunger, based upon the novel Hunger by Norwegian Nobel Prize-winning author Knut Hamsun. The film was nominated for the Palme D'Or and won the Bodil Award for Best Danish Film in 1967 and other awards for the cast after his death.

== Death ==
He died on 18 March 1966 at the age of 71 following a nearly 60-year-long career. He was buried at Ordrup Cemetery. Osvald Helmuth was the father of actor Frits Helmuth.

== Selected filmography ==
- Operabranden - 1912
- Det evige Had - 1915
- I Storm og Stille - 1915
- Hævnens Nat - 1916
- Hendes Mands Forlovede - 1919
- De Nygifte - 1920
- Silkesstrumpan - 1921
- Tyvepak - 1921
- Ungkarleliv - 1921
- Cirkusrevyen - Hen te' kommoden - 1936
- Der var engang en vicevært - 1937
- En fuldendt gentleman - 1937
- Cocktail - 1937
- Den mandlige husassistent - 1938
- Blaavand melder storm - 1938
- Familien Olsen - 1940
- En mand af betydning - 1941
- Ebberød Bank - 1943
- Op med humøret - 1943
- Stjerneskud - 1947
- Berlingske Tidende (film) - 1949
- Som sendt fra himlen - 1951
- Vores fjerde far - 1951
- Den kloge mand (1956) - 1956
- Pigen i søgelyset - 1959
- En by ved navn København - 1960
- Den hvide hingst - 1961
- Harry og kammertjeneren - 1961
- Jensen længe leve - 1965
- Hunger - 1966

== Literature ==
- John Lindskog, Faders vilje - Osvald, Søster og Frits Helmut - dramaet bag scenen, Aschehoug, 2006. ISBN 87-11-30017-5.
- Sven Borre, Bogen om Osvald, Stig Vendelkjærs Forlag, 1967.
- Osvald Helmuth, Lev stærkt - dø gammel, Stig Vendelkær, 1963. (Erindringer)
