= Lulu Ziegler =

Danish actress, singer and theatre director (1903–1973)

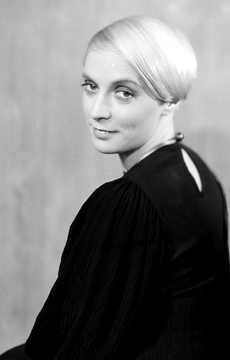
- Ziegler in 1934
- Born: Karen Margrete Maria Ziegler; 18 April 1903; Sorø, Denmark
- Died: 14 November 1973 (aged 70); Copenhagen, Denmark
- Occupations: Actress, singer
- Years active: 1930 — 1973
- Spouse(s): Hugo Lorenz Jensen, Per Thor Brockdorff Knutzon, Kristian Carsten Lindqvist
- Children: 2
- Parent(s): Axel Johan Ziegler-Andersen, Johanne Margrethe Veistrup

Karen Margrete Maria "Lulu" Ziegler (18 April 1903 – 14 November 1973) was a Danish actress, singer and theatre director active in Denmark and Sweden. She gained fame as a cabaret singer in the 1930s, enchanting her audiences in her own expressive style. In 1942, after attracting anti-German support at her cabaret in central Copenhagen, she was forced to flee to Sweden where she continued her highly popular anti-Nazi performances in revues. After the war, she returned to Denmark where she was welcomed as a heroine. When her popularity waned in the 1950s, she returned to Sweden, performing in the cabaret restaurant Hamburger Börs. There she directed shows with performances including Lars Forssell's increasingly popular chansons. She later devoted her skills to theatre management, directing shows in Gothenburg and Odense where she staged the musical Cabaret in 1968.

== Early life and education ==
Born on 18 April 1903 in Sorø, Margrete Maria Ziegler-Andersen was the daughter of the dentists Axel Johan Ziegler-Andersen (1875–1960) and Johanne Margrethe Veistrup (1873–1960). In October 1926, she married the representative Hugo Lorenz Jensen; the marriage was dissolved in 1936. In December 1936, she married the stage director Per Thor Brockdorff Knutzon (1897–1948). In September 1950, she married the Norwegian director Kristian Carsten Lindqvist. She had two children: Anne Jensen (1935) and Lars Knutzon (1941).

Lulu Ziegler was raised in a comfortable middle-class environment in Sorø together with her younger sister Aase (1906–1975) who also became an actress. After matriculating from high school in 1921, she moved to Copenhagen where she began to study English and singing at the University of Copenhagen. She was nevertheless attracted by the stage, first performing in a student production in 1926. She gave up her university studies and in the late 1930s turned to acting, becoming a pupil of Svend Methling at Det Ny Teater.

== Career ==
It was at Det Ny Teater that she made her debut in 1930 as Jenny in Bertolt Brecht's musical play Laser og pjalter. While on a visit to Berlin, she became a personal friend of Brecht. When he fled to Denmark from Nazi Germany in 1934, he lived for a period in her home. For a few seasons she was attached to the Betty Nansen Theatre but never made any real headway.

It was only when she met her second husband Per Knutzon that she began to receive attention. On his recommendation, in 1933 she impressed her audience at the Riddersalen Theatre as she sang alone on the stage. One reviewer welcomed her striking performance, describing her as "A fully-fledged artist in her field". When Knutzon became the theatre's director, she performed in revues interpreting texts by Poul Henningsen. In 1938, she moved to Paris where she sang in a cabaret in the Latin quarter. On moving back to Copenhagen. she opened her own "Lulu Ziegler Cabaret" on Kongens Nytorv. There she managed to attract full houses as she developed a reputation of resistance during the German occupation. When threatened with arrest, she escaped to Sweden in a rowing boat in 1942, together with her husband, Per Knutzon, and her two small children.

In Sweden, she quickly established herself, performing in revues in Stockholm arranged by the anti-Nazi director Karl Gerhard and the less politically motivated Kar de Mumma. She reported she had appeared in over 700 performances. Between revues, she toured the country and sang in public parks.

After the end of the war, Ziegler returned to Denmark where she was welcomed as a heroine and a former resistance worker. Her songs and the related recordings gained popularity, especially her own theme song "Ved Kajen" (On the Quayside) and, in 1948, her "Den sidste turist i Europa" (The Last Tourist in Europe), lyrics by Mogens Dam, music by Henrik Blichmann. But as time moved on, the Danes grew tired of their war heroes and her popularity suffered. As a result, she moved back to Sweden where she became hugely successful at the Hamburger Börs Restaurant, often appearing alone on the stage but also acting as a show director for other performers. In particular, Forssell's chansons such as "Jag står här på ett torg" (I'm Here in the Square) and "Säg vad ni vill" (Say What You Want) gained popularity there.

Ziegler spent the last years of her career touring the Nordic countries but ultimately devoted her time to directing theatre productions, especially at the Gothenburg City Theatre in Sweden and at the Odense Teater, where she staged the first Danish performance of the musical Cabaret.

Lulu Ziegler died in Copenhagen on 14 November 1973, aged 70.

== Filmography ==
Year	Title	Role	Director	Notes
1937	Der var engang en vicevært	Lulu	Lau Lauritzen	
1938	A Cruise in the Albertina	Nightclub singer		
1951	Fireogtyve Timer	Singer	Asbjørn Andersen	
1951	Ukjent mann	Cabaret singer	Astrid Henning-Jensen	
1973	Mig og Mafiaen	Danish-American	Henning Ørnbak	
