= Cirkusrevyen 1936 =

1936 film

- Directed by: Lau Lauritzen Jr. Alice O'Fredericks
- Starring: Ingeborg Bruhn Bertelsen
- Release date: 2 November 1936
- Running time: 90 minutes
- Country: Denmark
- Language: Danish

Cirkusrevyen 1936 is a 1936 Danish comedy film directed by Lau Lauritzen Jr. and Alice O'Fredericks.

== Cast ==
- Ingeborg Bruhn Bertelsen - Herself / Various roles
- Ludvig Brandstrup - Himself / Various Roles
- Emil Hass Christensen - Himself / Various Roles
- Osvald Helmuth - Himself / Various Roles
- Lau Lauritzen, Jr. - Himself / Various Roles
- August Miehe - Himself / Various Roles
- Ella Peaters - Herself / Various Roles
