= Lars Knutzon =

Danish actor and director

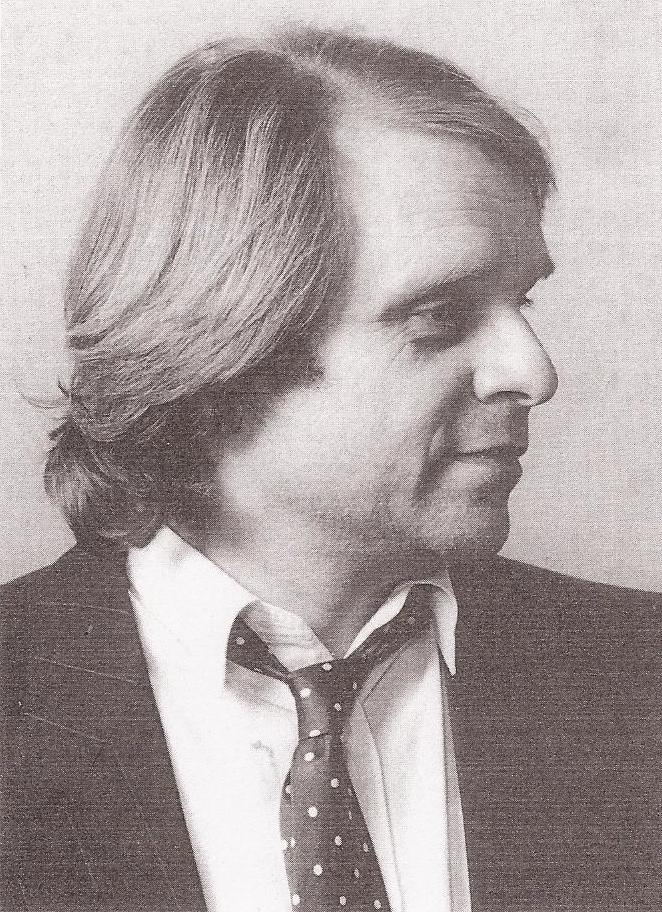
Lars Knutzon, 1990.

Lars Knutzon (born 1 October 1941) is a Danish actor and director, best known to international audiences for his role as Bent Sejrø in the Danish TV drama Borgen.

He is the son of actor, director and theatre director Per Knutzon and cabaret singer Lulu Ziegler and was trained in acting at the Odense Theatre in 1967 and was then employed by the theatre.

Lars Knutzon has worked for many years as director and actor in a number of Danish theatre and has also played a number of roles in TV, on radio and in film.

On the stage he has appeared in A Midsummer Night's Dream, As You Like It, Don Quixote, Koks i Kulissen, Waiting for Godot, Woyzeck, Slutspil and Hamlet.

On television Knutzon has appeared in Krøniken, TAXA, A great family, Ludo, Kald mig-Liva, Bryggeren, all four seasons of Borgen. and Christmas series Nissebanden, Alletiders Nisse and Jul in Kronborg.

== Selected films ==
- Gertrud – 1964
- Jensen længe leve – 1965
- Den gale dansker – 1969
- Det gode og det onde – 1975
- Hjerter er trumf – 1976
- Verden er fuld af børn – 1980
- Med lille Klas i kufferte – 1983
- Kurt og Valde – 1983
- Lykken er en underlig fisk – 1989
- Viktor og Viktoria – 1993
- Hjælp - Min datter vil giftes – 1993
- Kun en pige – 1995
- Ørnens øje – 1997
- TAXA – 1999
- Toast – 1999
- I Wonder Who's Kissing You Now – 1998
- Albert – 1998
- Manden som ikke ville dø – 1999
- En kort en lang – 2001
- Oh Happy Day – 2004
- Det grå guld – 2010
- Borgen – 2010 - 2012
