= Frøken Kirkemus =

1941 film

- Directed by: Lau Lauritzen Jr. Alice O'Fredericks
- Written by: Ladislas Fodor (play); Ragnar Hyltén-Cavallius; Paul Sarauw
- Produced by: Henning Karmark
- Starring: Marguerite Viby
- Cinematography: Rudolf Frederiksen; Alf Schnéevoigt
- Edited by: Marie Ejlersen
- Release date: 26 December 1941
- Running time: 93 minutes
- Country: Denmark
- Language: Danish

Frøken Kirkemus (lit. Miss Churchmouse) is a 1941 Danish family film directed by Lau Lauritzen Jr. and Alice O'Fredericks starring Marguerite Viby. The film was remade in Sweden the same year (as Fröken Kyrkråtta), directed by Schamyl Bauman, again with Viby in the lead role. The film is an adaptation of Ladislas Fodor's play A templon egére, which was adapted into an English play titled A Church Mouse by Benn Levy in 1931 and then an American film, Beauty and the Boss, by Roy del Ruth in 1932.

== Cast ==
- Marguerite Viby as Frk. Eva Holm
- Poul Reumert as Direktør Thomas Berg
- Johannes Meyer as Obersten
- Ib Schønberg as Bogholder Blom
- Else Jarlbak as Lilli Lund
- Knud Rex as Berg junior
- Knud Heglund as Overtjener
- Buster Larsen as Frode
- Henry Nielsen as Nattevagt Andersen

== Release and screenings ==
In 1942, the film was the first film to be screened at Saga Bio, when the cinema opened, on Vesterbrogade, in Copenhagen.

== Reception ==
Both versions of the film as well as Frk. Vildkat's were noted for Viby's roles, through which the actress "continued to charm younger and especially older men with her youthful enthusiasm, her straightforwardness". In particular, the Danish film is remembered for Reumert's "charming interaction" with Viby.
