= En sømand går i land =

1954 film

- Directed by: Lau Lauritzen Jr.
- Written by: Grete Frische
- Produced by: Poul Bang
- Starring: Poul Reichhardt
- Cinematography: Rudolf Frederiksen
- Edited by: Wera Iwanouw
- Music by: Sven Gyldmark
- Distributed by: ASA Film
- Release date: 26 July 1954
- Running time: 101 minutes
- Country: Denmark
- Language: Danish

En sømand går i land is a 1954 Danish comedy film directed by Lau Lauritzen Jr. and starring Poul Reichhardt.

== Cast ==
- Poul Reichhardt as Vladimir W. Olsen
- Lau Lauritzen, Jr. as Frederik Larsen
- Mogens Hermansen as porter in the seamen's home
- Carl Johan Hviid as Manager Nielsen in the seamen's home
- Fernanda Movin as Fru Nielsen
- Jørn Jeppesen as Pastor Poulsen
- Knud Heglund as Hr. Jespersen
- Paul Hagen as Værtshusgæst
- Emil Hass Christensen - police assistant
- Ib Schønberg as Bach / 'Beethoven'
- Carl Ottosen as Herman
- Per Gundmann as Herman's companion
- Lisbeth Movin as Inger Knudsen
- Marie Brink as Fru Mortensen
- Birgitte Bruun as Esther
- Tove Grandjean as lady at the maternity aid office
- Thorkil Lauritzen as head of department in the department store
