= Lise kommer til Byen =

1947 film

- Directed by: Lau Lauritzen Jr. Alice O'Fredericks
- Written by: Grete Frische
- Starring: Gerda Gilboe
- Cinematography: Rudolf Frederiksen
- Edited by: Marie Ejlersen
- Music by: Sven Gyldmark
- Release date: 18 August 1947
- Running time: 101 minutes
- Country: Denmark
- Language: Danish

Lise kommer til Byen is a 1947 Danish family film directed by Lau Lauritzen Jr. and Alice O'Fredericks.

== Cast ==
- Gerda Gilboe as Lise Olsen
- Poul Reichhardt as Instruktør Dan 'Basse' Burling
- Lau Lauritzen Jr. as Filmdirektør Hans Berg
- Lisbeth Movin as Scriptgirlen Irma Hansen
- Lise Thomsen as Skuespiller Nanna Johansen
- Preben Mahrt as Skuespiller Karl
- Henning Ahrensborg as Skolelærer Nielsen
- Kjeld Petersen as Forsikringsagent Tage Sørensen
- Einar Juhl as Direktør Svendsen
- Marius Hansen as Krovært
- Ib Schønberg as Skuespiller Kristoffer 'Steff' Steffensen
- Sven Gyldmark as Himself
- Mogens Dam as Himself
- Poul Bundgaard as Medlem af filmholdet (uncredited)
- Marie Ejlersen as Herself (uncredited)
- Johan Jacobsen as Himself (uncredited)
- Kjeld Jacobsen as Filmoperatør (uncredited)
- Henry Nielsen as Taxachauffør (uncredited)
- Ove Sprogøe as Filmoperatør (uncredited)
