= The Red Meadows =

1945 film by Bodil Ipsen, Lau Lauritzen

- 1945 movie poster by Kai Rasch
- Danish: De røde enge
- Directed by: Bodil Ipsen; Lau Lauritzen Jr.
- Written by: Lech Fischer; Ole Juul (book)
- Produced by: Jens Dennow; Henning Karmark
- Starring: Poul Reichhardt; Lisbeth Movin
- Cinematography: Rudolf Frederiksen
- Edited by: Marie Ejlersen
- Music by: Sven Gyldmark
- Distributed by: ASA Film
- Release date: 1945
- Running time: 85 minutes
- Country: Denmark
- Language: Danish

The Red Meadows (Danish: De røde enge) is a 1945 Danish war drama directed by Bodil Ipsen and Lau Lauritzen Jr. based on resistance fighter Ole Valdemar Juul's 1945 novel of the same name. The film, starring Poul Reichhardt and Lisbeth Movin, is a suspense tale revolving around the memories of a Danish saboteur as he awaits his execution in a German war-time prison. Filmed in Denmark only months after the end of the German occupation during World War II, Red Meadows was a tribute to the Danish resistance fighters. The film received the Palme d'Or at the Cannes Film Festival and is considered a stylistic masterwork.

== Plot ==
In German-occupied Denmark during World War II, the young Danish saboteur Michael (Poul Reichhardt) sits in a Gestapo jail and awaits his execution. His thoughts go back to the events that led to his capture. In a meadow in Jutland, Michael and his comrades wait for a British airdrop of weapons and explosives to use for the resistance. Afterward, while in his hideout, Michael is surprised by German soldiers. He shoots his way out and is able to slip free. On a country road, a car driven by a German Field Officer (Arne Hershold) stops. Michael overpowers the officer and shoots him. Dressed in the officer's uniform, Michael is able to reach Copenhagen and find his girlfriend Ruth (Lisbeth Movin) at the hotel where she lives. Toto (Lau Lauritzen), the leader of the resistance group, is waiting for him. They are planning to sabotage a weapons factory. However, there is suspicion that there is an informant in the group, so the plan is delayed. One of the group's members, Dreyer (Freddy Koch), is arrested, so Ruth and Michael flee to her uncle's summer house. Ruth is frightened of losing Michael. She says, If you die, then everything is meaningless - then I'm not a person anymore - and the meadows aren't green anymore -- they are colored the red of your blood. Plans for the sabotage are completed and the group goes into action. But it is revealed that there has been an informant, when the group is surprised by soldiers lying in wait for them. During the firefight, Michael is wounded. However, he is able to blow up the factory before he is captured. Back in the Gestapo jail, the prison guard Steinz (Per Buckhøj) who hates the war and the Nazis, tries to help Michael in small ways, but is unable to prevent his torture. Michal is able to resist during the brutal torture, but he is condemned to death. While in jail, Michael suspects who the informant is and through Steinz gets a message to his comrades: The apple is rotten. A trap is set and Prikken (Preben Neergaard) reveals himself as the informer. There is no other way but to kill him and it is not difficult to find members who will do it. While being driven to his execution, Steinz tells Michael that he has received a message—Steinz's entire family was killed during an Allied aerial bombardment that week. Michael asks Steinz to escape with him. Steinz declines and shoots himself in the car. Michael flees and seeks refuge in a bakery where he is able to contact Toto. Both Michael and Ruth find transport to Sweden where they can finally rest.

== Cast ==
Actor	Role
Poul Reichhardt	Micheal Lans
Lisbeth Movin	Ruth Isaksen
Per Buckhøj	Prison guard Steinz
Gyrd Løfqvist	Gustav
Preben Kaas	Erik
Kjeld Jacobsen	Hansen
Arne Hersholdt	German field marshal
Karl Jørgensen	German major
Lau Lauritzen	Toto
Preben Neergaard	Prikken
Bjørn Watt-Boolsen	Tom
Preben Lerdorff Rye	Alf
Freddy Koch	Dryer
Hjalmar Madsen	Hotel clerk
Bjørn Spiro	German officer
