= Nordhavets mænd =

1939 film

- Directed by: Lau Lauritzen
- Written by: Peter Tutein
- Produced by: Henning Karmark
- Cinematography: Karl Andersson, Poul Eibye, Leo Hansen
- Edited by: Marie Ejlersen
- Music by: Peter Deutsch
- Release date: 1939
- Running time: 101 minutes
- Country: Denmark
- Language: Danish

Nordhavets mænd is a 1939 Danish family adventure film directed by Lau Lauritzen.

== Cast ==
- Johannes Meyer as Sigurds far, konsul Jernø
- Lau Lauritzen as Sigurd Jernø
- Poul Reichhardt as Lorens
- Gull-Maj Norin as Aino Flatø
- Knud Almar as Edwin Flatø
- Victor Montell as Gamle August
- Carlo Wieth as Kaptajn Ek
- Paul Rohde as Sverre
- Thorkil Lauritzen as Kok
- Ingeborg Pehrson as Gamle Lise
