= Tove Bang =

Danish actress (1904–1977)

- Born: 18 February 1904; Copenhagen, Denmark
- Died: 26 March 1977 (aged 73)
- Occupation: Actress
- Years active: 1930-1975

Tove Bang (18 February 1904 – 26 March 1977) was a Danish actress. She appeared in more than 20 films between 1930 and 1975.

== Selected filmography ==
- Jeg har elsket og levet (1940)
- En mand af betydning (1941)
- Hr. Petit (1948)
- The Crime of Tove Andersen (1953)
