= Dolly Takes a Chance =

1944 film

- Directed by: Gustaf Edgren
- Written by: Paul Sarauw; Gardar Sahlberg; Gustaf Edgren
- Starring: Marguerite Viby; Karl-Arne Holmsten; Lasse Krantz
- Cinematography: Åke Dahlqvist
- Edited by: Oscar Rosander
- Music by: Nils Castegren; Kai Gullmar; Sven Gyldmark; Sune Waldimir
- Production company: Fribergs Filmbyrå
- Release date: 6 November 1944
- Running time: 79 minutes
- Country: Sweden
- Language: Swedish

Dolly Takes a Chance (Swedish: Dolly tar chansen) is a 1944 Swedish comedy film co-written and directed by Gustaf Edgren and starring Marguerite Viby, Karl-Arne Holmsten and Lasse Krantz. A separate Danish version Teatertosset was also made the same year.

The film's sets were designed by Arne Åkermark.

== Synopsis ==
An aspiring actress, currently working as a waitress, tries to land a big stage role.

== Main cast ==
- Marguerite Viby as Dolly Holm
- Karl-Arne Holmsten as Knut Lambert
- Lasse Krantz as Adrian Brummer
- Hjördis Petterson as Nanna Sten
- John Botvid as Lund
- Ludde Gentzel as Vogel
- Rune Halvarsson as Hasse Frank
- Göte Ahrnbring as Ludde
- Julia Cæsar as Antonia Nero
- Douglas Håge as Remover

== Bibliography ==
- Per Olov Qvist & Peter von Bagh, Guide to the Cinema of Sweden and Finland. Greenwood Publishing Group, 2000.
