= Kjeld Jacobsen =

Danish actor (1915–1970)

- Born: 11 November 1915; Denmark
- Died: 6 June 1970 (aged 54)
- Occupation: Actor
- Years active: 1945–1970

Kjeld Jacobsen (11 November 1915 – 6 June 1970) was a Danish actor. He appeared in more than 40 films between 1945 and 1970. For his role as the father in Once There Was a War he won the Bodil Award for Best Actor in a Supporting Role.

== Selected filmography ==
- The Red Meadows (1945)
- The Invisible Army (1945)
- Lise kommer til Byen (1947)
- The Swedenhielm Family (1947)
- The Viking Watch of the Danish Seaman (1948)
- Den opvakte jomfru (1950)
- Alt dette og Island med (1951)
- This Is Life (1953)
- Der kom en dag (1955)
- Hidden Fear (1957)
- Englen i sort (1957)
- Faith, Hope and Witchcraft (1960)
- Komtessen (1961)
- Paradise and Back (1964)
- To (1964)
- Once There Was a War (1966)
- Brødrene på Uglegaarden (1967)
