= Lise Thomsen =

Danish actress

- Born: 26 December 1914; Florida, United States
- Died: 26 November 2003 (aged 88); Denmark
- Occupation: Actress
- Years active: 1938–1977

Lise Thomsen (26 December 1914 – 26 November 2003) was a Danish film actress. She appeared in 38 films between 1938 and 1977. She was born in Florida and died in Denmark.

== Filmography ==
- Terror (1977)
- Nøddebo Præstegård (1974)
- Sankt Hansaften-spil] (1972)
- Daddy, Darling (1970)
- Ved du hvad du skulle? Gifte dig med Tulle! (1970)
- Midt i en jazztid (1969)
- Dyrlægens plejebørn (1968)
- Mig og min lillebror og storsmuglerne (1968)
- Jag en kvinna, II - äktenskapet (1968)
- Mig og min lillebror (1967)
- Min kones ferie (1967)
- Bukserne (1967)
- Jeg - en marki (1967)
- I stykker (1966)
- Jag - en älskare (1966)
- Dyden går amok (1966)
- Mor bag rattet (1965)
- Jensen længe leve (1965)
- Landmandsliv (1965)
- Alt for kvinden (1964)
- Støv for alle pengene (1963)
- Den hvide hingst (1961)
- Krudt og klunker (1958)
- Sønnen fra Amerika (1957)
- Nålen (1951)
- Unge piger forsvinder i København (1951)
- Hvor er far? (1948)
- Lise kommer til Byen (1947)
- Jeg elsker en anden (1946)
- Diskret Ophold (1946)
- Billet mrk. (1946)
- Afsporet (1942)
- Gå med mig hjem (1941)
- Wienerbarnet (1941)
- En forbryder (1941)
- I de gode, gamle dage (1940)
- I dag begynder livet (1939)
- Blaavand melder Storm (1938)
