= Rikki og mændene =

1962 film

- Directed by: Lau Lauritzen Jr. Lisbeth Movin
- Written by: Johannes Allen; Jon Iversen; Sara Kordon
- Produced by: Lau Lauritzen Jr.
- Starring: Ghita Nørby
- Cinematography: Rudolf Frederiksen
- Edited by: Wera Iwanouw
- Music by: Sven Gyldmark
- Distributed by: ASA Film
- Release date: 15 October 1962
- Running time: 101 minutes
- Country: Denmark
- Language: Danish

Rikki og mændene is a 1962 Danish drama film directed by Lau Lauritzen Jr. and Lisbeth Movin and starring Ghita Nørby.

== Cast ==
- Ghita Nørby as Rikki
- Poul Reichhardt as Ole
- Holger Juul Hansen as Peter
- Preben Mahrt as Chris
- Bodil Steen as Dorte
- Bendt Rothe as Knud
- Palle Huld as Pedersen
- Kaspar Rostrup as Den unge mand
- Knud Schrøder as Ubehagelig kunde
- Poul Müller as Rikkis chef
- Ebba Høeg as Prostitueret
- Bjarne Forchhammer as Mand på huslejekontor
- Hugo Herrestrup as Købmand
- Bente Wienberg Hansen
- Ole Wisborg as Inspektør i bar
- Bodil Miller as Prostitueret
- Gitte Lee as Prostitueret (as Gitte Kröncke)
- Lisbeth Movin as Peters kone
- Karin as Rikkis datter
- Thorkil Lauritzen as George, bartender
