= Fantasy Pieces for Oboe and Piano =

Compositions by Carl Nielsen

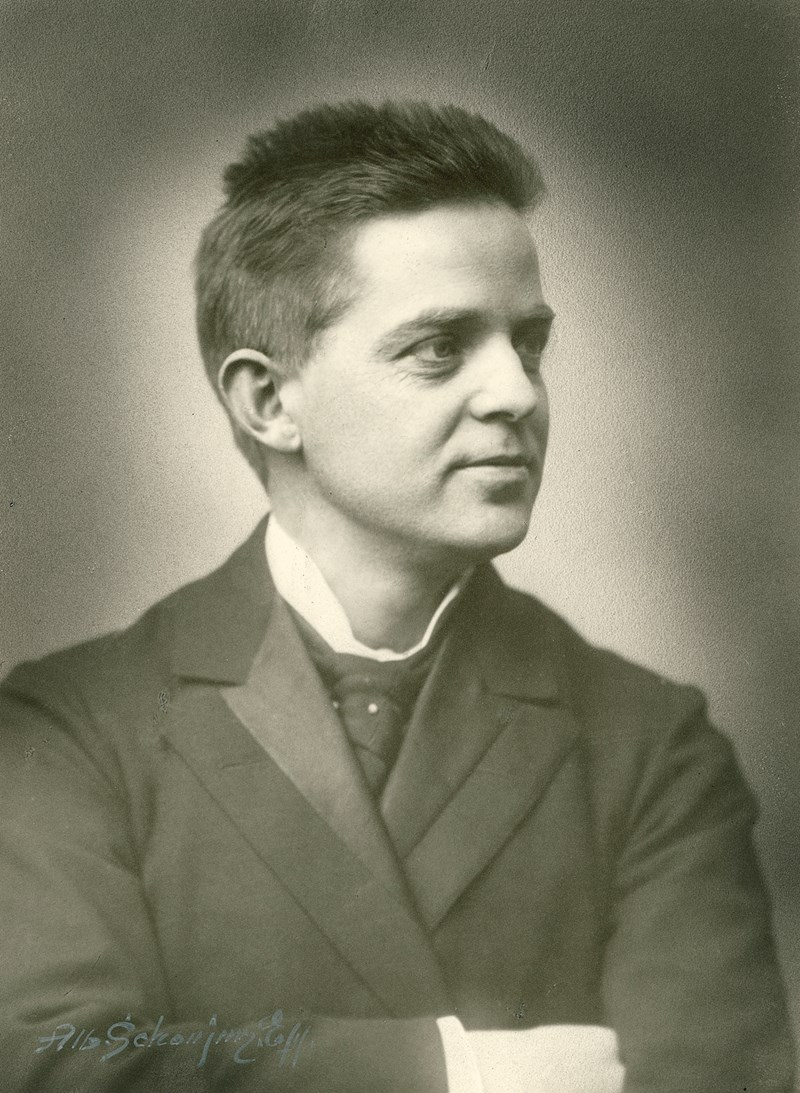
Carl Nielsen in 1901

Carl Nielsen's Fantasy Pieces for Oboe and Piano (Danish: Fantasistykker for obo og klavier), Op. 2, were composed shortly after the composer had taken up the post of second violinist in the Royal Danish Orchestra in 1889. The two pieces which make up the opus were first performed at the Royal Orchestra Soirée in Copenhagen on 16 March 1891. The oboist was Olivo Krause (to whom they are dedicated) and the pianist Victor Bendix.

== Background ==
In her list of Nielsen's compositions, Emilie Demant Hatt notes that the first fantasy piece, "Andante" (later "Romance") was completed on 30 November 1889, and that "Intermezzo", was finished on 9 March 1890. From the same source, it appears that the Romance was originally intended to be for oboe and organ. In the summer of 1890, Nielsen had sent his manuscript to Orla Rosenhoff who had instructed him at the Conservatory. Rosenhoff responded: "Here and there a little adjustment has been made in the piano part; you will easily discover what I refer to, but could with the same ease restore the original if you do not agree with me about the changes."

Changes were indeed made to the piano part. Nielsen, who was in Dresden on a grant when he read the proofs in the autumn of 1890, commented in his diary entry for 18 September: "Have spent the day reading proofs of my oboe pieces. At one place in the second piece some A’s had to be deleted, so now it says a bort, a bort (A away, A away). The joke that I have aborted my own brainchild suggests itself rather strongly." Just four days later, Nielsen explains that he and the pianist Victor Bendix played the fantasy pieces at a social gathering in Dresden: "First we played Bendix’s trio (I played the violin). Beautiful piece of music! Then B. and I played my two oboe pieces. This was in reality the greatest triumph I have had so far." Nielsen no doubt played the oboe part on the violin.

== Reception ==
The first public performance of the fantasy pieces was at the Royal Orchestra Soirée on 16 March 1891. The oboist was Olivo Krause and the pianist Victor Bendix. Aftenbladet was enthusiastic: "As for new pieces, what was on offer last night was Carl Nielsen’s Fantasy Pieces for Oboe and Piano. In this the young, talented composer has revealed no mean knowledge of the peculiarities of the oboe as well as great technical skill in the structure of the composition. It is not ordinary, hackneyed motifs that Mr Carl Nielsen uses; calmly and steadily he goes his own way. For that reason one can safely pin great hopes on the future of the young artist. Mr Olivo Krause performed the not entirely easy oboe part with a full, beautiful tone, and Mr Victor Bendix played the piano part tastefully and finely." Politiken also praised the young composer's "decided compositional talent" while Berlingske Tidende highlighted Nielsen's "close knowledge of the peculiarities of the oboe as a solo instrument" and mentioned "the lively applause" at the end.

The pieces were performed on several other occasions during Nielsen's lifetime. Hans Sitt's transcriptions of the Romance for violin and orchestra and for violin and piano were also popular. On at least one occasion Nielsen appeared as the violinist and in 1926 he conducted the orchestral work in Aarhus, Silkeborg and Odense.

== Music ==
In a programme note written at least 20 years after he composed the oboe piece, Nielsen offered the following short description: "The two oboe pieces are a very early opus. The first — slow — piece gives the oboe the opportunity to sing out its notes quite as beautifully as this instrument can. The second is more humorous, roguish, with an undertone of Nordic nature and forest rustlings in the moonlight."
