= Farlig Ungdom =

- 1953 Movie Poster by Aage Lundvald
- Directed by: Lau Lauritzen Jr.
- Written by: Johannes Allen
- Produced by: Lau Lauritzen Jr.
- Starring: Ib Mossin; Birgitte Bruun
- Cinematography: Rudolf Frederiksen
- Edited by: Wera Iwanouw
- Music by: Sven Gyldmark
- Distributed by: ASA Film
- Release date: 1953
- Running time: 109 minutes
- Country: Denmark
- Language: Danish

Johnny Farlig (English; Dangerous Youth) is a 1953 Danish crime drama directed by Lau Lauritzen Jr. and starring Ib Mossin and Birgitte Bruun. The film tells the dark story about a naive youth being drawn into a life of petty crime and unable to break away. The film received the Bodil Award for Best Danish Film in 1954.

== Plot ==
Seventeen-year-old Egon (Ib Mossin), an apprentice mechanic in a small town near Copenhagen, naively falls into the company of criminals. When the thieves dare Egon to prove himself worthy of their company, Egon steals a doctor's bag from a parked car. Getting away easily, Egon becomes involved with crime. After brutally mugging a local butcher one evening, Egon and his buddies are arrested. Egon is sentenced to a home for juvenile delinquents. He meets the sympathetic Ruth (Anni Stangerup), who tries to encourage him to go straight, but finds she has little power to change him. When Egon is released from the juvenile home, he has lost his naivete and become a hardened criminal. He organizes a gang, proving himself a merciless leader, and says they will commit crimes "the right way." Egon surrounds himself with a group of the town's antisocial individuals: Manchester (Ole Wisborg) a drug addict and dealer, Johnny (Thomas Rasch) the spoiled doctor's son, the callous Karl (Per Lauesgaard), the weakling Ejnar (Klaus Nielsen), and the dimwitted but sweetly loyal Alice (Birgitte Bruun). Egon decides to burgle a slaughterhouse. But his new girlfriend Tove (Kirsten Venner) betrays him to the police out of jealousy. The new band of criminals is arrested and sentenced to prison. Only Ejnar is able to break free of his criminal connections, and the community gives him a new chance.

== Selected cast ==
- Ib Mossin as Egon Madsen
- Birgitte Bruun as Alice
- Per Lauesgaard as Balladekarl
- Ole Wisborg as Alfred (Manchester)
- Kirsten Verner as Tove
- Claus Nielsen as Einar
- Thomas Rasch as John 'Johnny' Høyer
- Anni Stangerup as Ruth Jensen
- Anders Taasti as Leif
- Poul Petersenas Politiadvokaten
- Ib Freuchen as Dr. H.V. Høyer
- Karl Stegger as Slagtermesteren
- Carl Heger as Sømanden
- Irwin Hasselmann as Fru Agnes Høyes
