= Olivos =

Olivos may refer to:

- Olivos, Argentina, a city in the Argentine province of Buenos Aires
- Los Olivos District, a district of the province of Lima in Peru
- Los Olivos, California, an unincorporated place in Santa Barbara County, California, U.S.
- Quinta de Olivos, one of the official residences of president of Argentina
- Olivos metro station, a Mexico City Metro station

== See also ==
- Olivo, a surname
