= Shipwrecked Max =

1936 film

- Directed by: Fritz Schulz; Sigurd Wallén
- Written by: Torsten Flodén; Norbert Garai; Börje Larsson; Guido Valentin; Rudolf Wendbladh; Kar de Mumma
- Produced by: Bengt Janzon; Rudi Löwenthal; Lorens Marmstedt
- Starring: Max Hansen; Gull-Maj Norin; Brita Appelgren
- Cinematography: Heinrich Balasch; Carl Halling; Václav Vích
- Edited by: Thor L. Brooks; Hans Gullander
- Music by: Axel Flyckt
- Production companies: National Film
- Distributed by: National Film; Götafilm; Wiener Film KG Morawsky & Company
- Release date: 9 November 1936
- Running time: 88 minutes
- Countries: Austria; Sweden
- Languages: German; Swedish

Shipwrecked Max (German: Rendezvous im Paradies, Swedish: Skeppsbrutne Max) is a 1936 Austrian-Swedish drama film directed by Fritz Schulz and Sigurd Wallén and starring Max Hansen, Gull-Maj Norin and Brita Appelgren. The script was written by no less than half a dozen writers, including Börje Larsson.

The film was produced in separate German and Swedish-language versions. Such Multiple-language version were common in the first few years of sound film before dubbing became more widespread.

The film was shot at the Sundbyberg Studios in Stockholm The film's sets were designed by the art directors Bertil Duroj and Bibi Lindström.

== Cast ==
=== Swedish version ===
- Max Hansen as Max Mattsson
- Björn Berglund as Sten Sergius - pilot
- Gull-Maj Norin as Ann-Kathrine
- Brita Appelgren as Bibi
- Greta Wenneberg as Karin
- Ragnar Falck as Olle - pianist
- Gösta Kjellertz as Bo Sanger - Bibi's brother
- Ingrid Wiksjö as Operetta primadonna
- Carl-Gunnar Wingård as Director Köhler
- Elof Ahrle as Publicity Expert
- John Norrman as Theater Director
- Viran Rydkvist as Julia - Bibi's maid
- Helge Andersson as Guest
- Gösta Bodin as Stagehand
- Emil Fjellström as Fisherman
- Richard Lindström as Bureau chief
- Einar Molin as Operetta singer
- Rutger Nygren as Operetta singer
- Karl-Magnus Thulstrup as Editor Johansson
- Rolf von Nauckhoff as Waiter

=== German version ===
- Max Hansen as Hans Madsen
- Alf von Sievers as Sergius - pilot
- Lizzi Waldmüller as Bibi
- Adolf E. Licho as Köhler
- Georgia Lind as Daisy Köhler
- Annemarie Sörensen as Karin
- Emil Fjellström as Axel Axelsson

== Bibliography ==
- Larsson, Mariah & Marklund, Anders (ed.). Swedish Film: An Introduction and Reader. Nordic Academic Press, 2010.
- Qvist, Per Olov & von Bagh, Peter. Guide to the Cinema of Sweden and Finland. Greenwood Publishing Group, 2000.
