= Blaavand melder storm =

1938 film

- Front cover of the Danish DVD
- Directed by: Lau Lauritzen Jr. Alice O'Fredericks
- Written by: Lau Lauritzen Jr. Børge Müller; Alice O'Fredericks
- Starring: Osvald Helmuth
- Cinematography: Karl Andersson
- Edited by: Marie Ejlersen
- Release date: 26 December 1938
- Running time: 102 minutes
- Country: Denmark
- Language: Danish

Blaavand melder storm is a 1938 Danish thriller film co-written and directed by Lau Lauritzen Jr. and Alice O'Fredericks.

== Cast ==
- Osvald Helmuth as Fiskeskipper Jens Olesen
- Frits Helmuth as Jens Olesen som barn
- Betty Söderberg as Anna Olesen
- Ellen Løjmar as Johanne Olesen
- Lise Thomsen as Inger
- Axel Frische as Fiskeskipper Christian Larsen
- Lau Lauritzen, Jr. as Svend Larsen
- John Price as Thorsten Larsen
- Johanne Fritz-Petersen as Karen
- Sigurd Langberg as Fiskeskipper Mads Olsen
- Carl Fischer as Fiskeskipper Claus Mikkelsen
- Carl Heger as Førstemand på 'Frida'
- Erik Malberg as Hjælper på 'Frida'
- Elith Foss as Kokkedreng på 'Frida'
- Gunnar Lauring as Førstemand på 'Falken'
- Thorkil Lauritzen as Kokkedreng på 'Falken'
