= Gull-Maj Norin =

Danish actress

- Born: 20 April 1913; Helsingborg, Sweden
- Died: 27 November 1997 (aged 84); Copenhagen, Denmark
- Occupation: Actress
- Years active: 1936–1947
- Spouse(s): Søren Melson (1940–1984)

Gull-Maj Norin (20 April 1913 – 27 November 1997) was a Danish actress of stage and film who performed in Denmark and Sweden during the 1930s and 1940s. She is best known for her leading role as the suspected serial murderer in the 1944 film noir thriller Melody of Murder.

== Early life ==
Norin was born in Helsingborg, Sweden, the daughter of the Swedish actress Ann-Sofi Norin (1893–1942), then moved to Denmark when she was 10.

== Career ==
At the age of 18, Norin appeared on stage in a production of Lysistrata at Copenhagen's Riddersalen Theater. The following year Norin landed a small role as a choirgirl in Emanuel Gregers's comedy film Odds 777. During the next several years she performed as a cabaret singer and stage actress in theaters in Denmark and Sweden.

Following several small film roles, she gained international recognition as the heroine in George Schnéevoigt's melodrama Fredløs (Outlawed). Hollywood director Josef von Sternberg saw her performance and asked Norin to replace the injured Merle Oberon in his film I, Claudius. She agreed and signed a contract with Alexander Korda, but the outbreak of World War II prevented the production. Norin remained in Scandinavia, working for ASA Film company in such movies as De Tre, måske fire, Nordhavets mænd and with Max Hansen in Wienerbarnet. With her Swedish background, she also made several films in Sweden.

In 1942, Norin stated that she would only do films and, preferably, only with Danish director Bodil Ipsen. Norin's finest performance came in Ipsen's 1944 crime thriller Mordets Melodi, in which Norin played a cabaret singer suspected of serial murder. The film is cited as a classic in Denmark and considered the first Danish film noir thriller.

Norin made only three more films, ending with 1947's Mani. After her brief career, she withdrew from public performance, later stating simply, "I didn't want to anymore." The Danish film critic Morten Piil wrote that Norin's acting created a "different female type with figures filled with tragic undertones and vague suffering."

== Personal life ==
Norin married film and television director Søren Melson in 1940. They remained married until his death in 1984. Norin died on 27 November 1997. She is buried in Mariebjerg Cemetery in Gentofte.

== Partial filmography ==
- Odds 777 (1932) – Korpige
- Two Men and a Widow (1933) – Karin Lundvall
- Karl Fredrik regerar (Karl Fredrik Reigns) (1934) – Lena
- Sången om den eldröda blomman (Man's Way with Women) (1934) – Maikki
- Fredløs (1935) – Aino
- Unfriendly Relations (1936) – May, hennes fosterdotter
- Shipwrecked Max (1936) – Ann-Kathrine
- Det begyndte ombord (1937) – Else Fischer
- De tre, måske fire (1939) – En Svensk dame
- Nordhavets mænd (1939) – Aino Flatø
- Tante Cramers testamente (1941) – Karine Lemberg
- Wienerbarnet (1941) – Else Sibone
- Et skud før midnat (1942) – Lili Holme
- Ballade i Nyhavn (1942) – Anna-Lisa
- Alle mand på dæk (1942) – Ellinor Berggren
- En herre i kjole og hvidt (A Gentleman in Top Hat and Tails) (1942) – Gloria Brandt
- For folkets fremtid (1943) – Speaker
- Drama på slottet (1943) – Justine Rosenkrantz
- Mordets Melodi (Melody of Murder) (1944) – Kabaretsangerinde Odette Margot / Sonja
- I går og i morgen (1945) – Dansende gæst i natklub
- Så mødes vi hos Tove (We Meet at Tove's) (1946) – Gerd
- Mani (1947) – Barbera Frank (final film role)
