= Per Gundmann =

Danish actor

- Born: 30 January 1906; Jystrup, Denmark
- Died: 6 October 1967 (aged 61); Copenhagen, Denmark

Per Gundmann (30 January 1906 – 6 October 1967) was a Danish stage and film actor.

== Filmography ==
- Fem raske piger – 1933
- Kidnapped – 1935
- Week-End – 1935
- Snushanerne – 1936
- Frøken Møllers jubilæum – 1937
- De tre måske fire – 1939
- I dag begynder livet – 1939
- Frøken Vildkat – 1942
- Mens sagføreren sover – 1945
- Hatten er sat – 1947
- En sømand går i land – 1954
- Mennesker mødes og sød musik opstår i hjertet – 1967
