= Lisbeth Movin =

Danish actress (1917–2011)

- Born: 25 August 1917; Odense, Denmark
- Died: 7 November 2011 (aged 94); Hillerød, Denmark
- Occupations: Actress, Director
- Years active: 1941–1987
- Spouse: Lau Lauritzen Jr.

Lisbeth Movin (25 August 1917 – 7 November 2011) was a Danish actress of stage and film best known for her role as Anne, the pastor's wife accused of witchcraft in the film Day of Wrath (1943) directed by Carl Theodor Dreyer. She also appeared as the widow in the screen adaptation of Babette's Feast (1987), directed by Gabriel Axel. She was the mother of actress Lone Lau.

Movin died on 7 November 2011 in Hillerød, Denmark, aged 94.

== Partial filmography ==
- Et skud før midnat (1942) - Inge Gram
- Søren Søndervold (1942) - Gerda Lundrup
- Når man kun er ung (1943) - Aase
- Day of Wrath (1943) - Anne Pedersdotter (Absalon's second wife) (uncredited)
- Jeg mødte en morder (1943) - Agnete Lønning
- Frihed, lighed og Louise (1944) - Gerda
- The Red Meadows (1945) - Ruth Isaksen
- Lise kommer til Byen (1947) - Scriptgirlen Irma Hansen
- Støt står den danske sømand (1948) - Mille Andersen
- Hr. Petit (1948) - Marguerite Palsler
- Det gælder os alle (1949) - Edith
- Den opvakte jomfru (1950) - Frk. Grøndal
- Café Paradis (1950) - Fortælleren
- Det Sande Ansigt (1951) - Redaktørens datter frk. Sonja
- Det store løb (1952) - Gerda Hein
- Avismanden (1952) - Dorrit
- Hejrenæs (1953) - Ulla Biehle
- This Is Life (1953) - Ulla Biehle
- En sømand går i land (1954) - Inger Knudsen
- Den store gavtyv (1956) - Sekretær
- Taxa K 1640 efterlyses (1956) - Else Svendsen
- Sønnen fra Amerika (1957) - Ingrid
- Det lille hotel (1958) - Pauline Wadenius
- Det skete på Møllegården (1960) - Martha
- Min kone fra Paris (1961) - Gerda Dreyer
- Rikki og mændene (1962) - Peters kone
- Sikke'n familie (1963) - Kvinde, hos hvem der bliver begået indbrud
- Jensen længe leve (1965) - Fru Landstrup
- Den røde kappe (1967) - Bengerd
- Mig og min lillebror og Bølle (1968) - (uncredited)
- Farlige kys (1972) - Birthes mor
- Øjeblikket (1980) - Line's mom
- Sidste akt (1987) - Gloria
- Babettes gæstebud (1987) - Widow (final film role)
