= En fuldendt gentleman =

1937 film

- Film poster
- Directed by: Lau Lauritzen Jr. Alice O'Fredericks
- Written by: Flemming Geill; Osvald Helmuth; Carl Viggo Meincke
- Produced by: Henning Karmark
- Starring: Osvald Helmuth
- Cinematography: Eskild Jensen
- Edited by: Marie Ejlersen
- Distributed by: 108 minutes
- Release date: 13 October 1937
- Country: Denmark
- Language: Danish

En fuldendt gentleman is a 1937 Danish family film directed by Lau Lauritzen Jr. and Alice O'Fredericks.

== Cast ==
- Osvald Helmuth as Mortensen
- Lau Lauritzen Jr. as Baron Henrik Falkenstjerne
- Oda Pasborg as Bodil von Hauch
- Karen Jønsson as Karen von Hauch
- Albrecht Schmidt - Grev Urne
- Ellen Margrethe Stein as Grevinde Urne
- Eigil Reimers as Grev Tage Urne
- Else Jarlbak as Ulla Platen
- Thorkil Lauritzen as Kammerjunker Torben von Gothenburg
- Erika Voigt as Apoteker Hornfleth
- Knud Almar as Inspektør Boye
- Alex Zander as Chauffør
- Carola Merrild as Stuepige
- Henry Nielsen as Frisørkunde
- Betty Helsengreen
