= The Viking Watch of the Danish Seaman =

1948 film

- 1948 Movie Poster by Kai Rasch
- Directed by: Bodil Ipsen; Lau Lauritzen Jr.
- Written by: Grete Frische
- Produced by: Lau Lauritzen Jr.
- Starring: Poul Reichhardt; Lisbeth Movin
- Cinematography: Rudolf Frederiksen
- Edited by: Marie Ejlersen
- Music by: Sven Gyldmark
- Distributed by: ASA Film
- Release date: 1948
- Running time: 105 minutes
- Country: Denmark
- Language: Danish

The Viking Watch of the Danish Seaman (Danish: Støt står den danske sømand) is a 1948 Danish war drama directed by Bodil Ipsen and Lau Lauritzen Jr. The film, known alternatively as Perilous Expedition or its literal title translation Steady stands the Danish sailor, written by Grete Frische based upon the wartime diary of Kaj Frische, tells the true story of Danish sailors who sailed with the Allied forces during the German occupation of Denmark in World War II. It stars Poul Reichhardt and Lisbeth Movin. The film received the Bodil Award for Best Danish Film in 1949.

== Cast ==
Actor	Role
Poul Reichhardt	Seaman Richardt Hansen
Lisbeth Movin	Mille Andersen
Lau Lauritzen, Jr.	Seaman Kaj (Frische)
Johannes Meyer	Jonas Olsen
Pauline Murray	Marion
Jørn Ording	Seaman Kaare
Per Buckhøj	Captain of the Marie Grubbe
Preben Lerdorff Rye	First Mate of the Marie Grubbe
Axel Frische	Captain of the Jette
Kjeld Jacobsen	First Mate of the Jette
Bjørn Watt-Boolsen	Telegraph Operator
Carl Heger	Seaman Frederik
Preben Neergaard	Seaman Lauritz
Karl Jørgensen	Captain of the Anne Margrete
Ove Sprogøe	Seaman Henry
Preben Uglebjerg	Cabin Boy
Jon Iversen	Danish Ambassador
Aksel Stevnsborg	German Ambassador
Henning Windfeldt	Seaman Per
Poul Secher	
Poul Bundgaard	Mate
