= Julia jubilerar =

1938 film

- Directed by: Lau Lauritzen Jr. Alice O'Fredericks
- Written by: Lau Lauritzen Jr. Alice O'Fredericks
- Starring: Katie Rolfsen
- Cinematography: Karl Andersson
- Edited by: Marie Ejlersen
- Release date: 13 August 1938
- Running time: 92 minutes
- Countries: Sweden; Denmark
- Language: Swedish

Julia jubilerar is a 1938 Swedish-Danish comedy film directed by Lau Lauritzen Jr. and Alice O'Fredericks.

The film is a remake of the 1935 German comedy Winter Night's Dream (Original title: Winternachtstraum).

== Synopsis ==
Just as the titular Julia, a cashier at a piano factory, goes on a vacation with her friends, her boss discovers that there is money missing at work.

== Cast ==
- Katie Rolfsen as Julia Lundkvist
- Thor Modéen as Mårten Lagergren, piano tuner
- Annalisa Ericson as Greta Ahlbom
- Lau Lauritzen, Jr. as Erik Kruse
- Åke Söderblom as Åke Jansson
- Oscar Törnblom as Oscar Hansson
- Eric Gustafson as Manager
- Nils Nordståhl as Secretary
- Hilding Rolin as Hallberg 'Professor'
- Claes Thelander as Hallberg 'Doctor'
- John Degerberg as Receptionist
- George Thunstedt as Porter
- Harald Svensson as Svensson, senior accountant

== See also ==
- Winter Night's Dream (1935)
- Frk. Møllers jubilæum (1937)
