= Kidnapped (1935 film) =

1935 film

- Directed by: Lau Lauritzen Jr. Alice O'Fredericks
- Written by: Lau Lauritzen Jr. Alice O'Fredericks
- Starring: Ib Schønberg
- Cinematography: Carl Helm; Eskild Jensen
- Edited by: Edith Schlüssel
- Music by: Victor Cornelius
- Release date: 10 January 1935
- Running time: 92 minutes
- Country: Denmark
- Language: Danish

Kidnapped is a 1935 Danish family film written and directed by Lau Lauritzen Jr. and Alice O'Fredericks.

== Cast ==
- Ib Schønberg as Peter Basse
- Arthur Jensen as Larsen
- Olga Svendsen as Hansine
- Osa Massen as Grethe
- Eigil Reimers as Benjamin Smith
- Per Gundmann as Automobilagent Hansen
- Holger-Madsen as Kriminalassistent
- Connie Meiling as Lille Connie
