= Frk. Møllers jubilæum =

1937 film

Frøken Møllers jubilæum
- Poster
- Directed by: Lau Lauritzen Jr. Alice O'Fredericks
- Written by: Lau Lauritzen Jr. Alice O'Fredericks
- Produced by: Henning Karmark
- Starring: Liva Weel
- Cinematography: Karl Andersson
- Edited by: Marie Ejlersen
- Music by: Victor Cornelius; Karen Jønsson
- Distributed by: ASA Film
- Release date: 30 August 1937
- Running time: 95 minutes
- Country: Denmark
- Language: Danish language

Frøken Møllers jubilæum is a 1937 Danish comedy film directed and written by Lau Lauritzen Jr. and Alice O'Fredericks. The film stars Liva Weel and Victor Borge.

== Cast ==
- Liva Weel as Frk. Møller
- Victor Borge as Klaverstemmer Asmussen ... credited as Børge Rosenbaum
- Karen Jønsson as Grete Holm
- Lau Lauritzen Jr. as Ingeniør Peter Juhl
- Poul Reichhardt as Peters friend
- Per Gundmann as Peters friend
- Jon Iversen as Direktør Smith
- Thorkil Lauritzen as Secretary
- Paul Rohde as Fuldmægtig Petersen
- Holger Strøm as Hotelrotte
- Olaf Ussing as Hotelrotte
- Alex Suhr as Konduktør
- Erik Olsson as Hotelkarl

== See also ==
- Winter Night's Dream (1935)
- Julia jubilerar (1938)
