= Connie Meiling =

Danish actress

Connie Meiling (born 29 November 1930) is a retired Danish child actress of the 1930s.

== Filmography ==
- Kidnapped (1935)
- Snushanerne (1936)
- Panserbasse (1936)
- Der var engang en vicevært (1937)
- Inkognito (1937)
- Pas på svinget i Solby (1940)
- En ganske almindelig pige (1940)
