= Den opvakte jomfru =

1950 film

- Film poster
- Directed by: Lau Lauritzen Jr. Alice O'Fredericks
- Written by: Poul Henningsen
- Produced by: Henning Karmark
- Starring: Marguerite Viby
- Cinematography: Rudolf Frederiksen
- Edited by: Marie Ejlersen
- Music by: Sven Gyldmark
- Release date: 16 April 1950
- Running time: 100 minutes
- Country: Denmark
- Language: Danish

Den opvakte jomfru (The Awakened Maiden) is a 1950 Danish comedy family film directed by Lau Lauritzen Jr. and Alice O'Fredericks.

In 1520, a ship is caught in a violent hurricane in the North Sea. The sailors are convinced that the abbot they have on board is the cause of their misfortune. They throw him overboard along with his holy scriptures.

== Cast ==
- Marguerite Viby as Skønjomfruen Anne Pedersdatter
- Helge Kjærulff-Schmidt as Profossor Ebenezer Steenhammer
- Lisbeth Movin as Frk. Grøndal
- Kjeld Jacobsen as Journalist
- Kjeld Petersen as Pressefotograf
- Sigurd Langberg as Profossor A.P. Jørgensen
- Elith Pio as Chefredaktør
- Knud Schrøder as Redaktionssekretær
- Minna Jørgensen as Steenhammers husbestyreinde
- Ib Schønberg as Abbeden
