= Stjerneskud =

1947 film

- Poster
- Directed by: Jon Iversen; Alice O'Fredericks
- Written by: Peer Guldbrandsen
- Starring: Dirch Passer
- Cinematography: Rudolf Frederiksen
- Music by: Kai Normann Andersen; Aage Stentoft
- Distributed by: Scandinavian Airlines System
- Release date: 1 December 1947
- Country: Denmark
- Language: Danish language

Stjerneskud is a 1947 Danish comedy film directed by Jon Iversen and Alice O'Fredericks. The film starred Osvald Helmuth and Einar Sissener and marked the debut of Dirch Passer. Stjerneskud is the Danish word for Meteor.

== Cast ==
- Osvald Helmuth
- Einar Sissener
- Betty Helsengreen
- Sigrid Horne-Rasmussen
- Helmuth Larsen
- Stig Lommer
- Henry Nielsen
- Dirch Passer
