= Klingende toner =

1945 film

- Directed by: Lau Lauritzen Jr. Alice O'Fredericks
- Written by: Lau Lauritzen Jr. Alice O'Fredericks
- Starring: Emil Christoffersen
- Cinematography: Rudolf Frederiksen
- Release date: 6 August 1945
- Country: Denmark
- Language: Danish

Klingende toner is a 1945 Danish film directed by Lau Lauritzen Jr. and Alice O'Fredericks.

== Cast ==
- Emil Christoffersen as himself
- Kirsten Thrane Petersen as herself
- Erik Sjöberg as himself
- Wandy Tworek as himself
