= Karl Jørgensen =

Danish actor (1890–1966)

- Born: 12 June 1890; Denmark
- Died: 26 February 1966 (aged 75)

Karl Jørgensen (12 June 1890 – 26 February 1966) was a Danish stage and film actor.

== Selected filmography ==
- Vesterhavsdrenge – 1950
- Støt står den danske sømand – 1948
- Penge som græs – 1948
- Tre år efter – 1948
- Lykke på rejsen – 1947
- Ditte Menneskebarn – 1946
- Affæren Birte – 1945
- De røde enge – 1945
- Frihed, lighed og Louise – 1944
- Besættelse – 1944
- Når man kun er ung – 1943
- Damen med de lyse handsker – 1942
- Alle mand på dæk – 1942
- Regnen holdt op – 1942
- Thummelumsen – 1941
- Tror du jeg er født i Gaar! – 1941
- Hallo! Afrika forude! – 1929
- Kys, klap og kommers – 1929
- Kongen af Pelikanien – 1928
- Kraft og skønhed – 1928
- Vester Vov-Vov – 1927
- Grænsefolket – 1927
- Raske Riviera Rejsende – 1924
- Blandt byens børn – 1923
