= Ingeborg Bruhn Bertelsen =

Danish actress (1894–1977)

- Born: 26 April 1894; Copenhagen, Denmark
- Died: 26 June 1977 (aged 83); Madison, Wisconsin, U.S.
- Occupation: Actress
- Years active: 1912–1936
- Spouses: Paul Sarauw; Edgar Hansen

Ingeborg Bruhn Bertelsen (26 April 1894 – 26 June 1977) was a Danish actress. She appeared in more than 80 films between 1911 and 1936.

== Selected filmography ==
- Kærlighed og Mobilisering (1915)
- Cirkusrevyen 1936 (1936)
