= A City Called Copenhagen =

1960 film

- Directed by: Jørgen Roos
- Written by: Elsa Gress; Roger Maridia; Jørgen Roos; Ole Roos
- Narrated by: Osvald Helmuth
- Cinematography: Jørgen Roos
- Release date: 27 June 1960
- Country: Denmark
- Language: Danish

A City Called Copenhagen (Danish: En by ved navn København) is a 1960 Danish short documentary film directed by Jørgen Roos. It was nominated for an Academy Award for Best Documentary Short. The film received positive reception.

== Synopsis ==
The film documents Copenhagen which includes its buildings, sights, and citizens.

== Production ==
It took a long time to commission and fund the film, which is referenced in the film and is "an example of its use of humour". The film was produced using Eastmancolor film stock. The group that commissioned the production disliked the content which resulted in it not being released until two years later, but it received positive reception upon release. The film's success gave Roos more opportunities to produce films within more countries. Similar to the director's next two films, A City Called Copenhagen has to do with the lives of citizens and walking throughout the city. The film's producers are the National Film Board (Statens Filmcentral), with sponsorships by the City Council of Copenhagen along with the Port of Copenhagen Authority. It was released by Brandon Films and Minerva Films in colour. Clive Bayliss is the English narrator and Bill Caldwell is the American narrator.

== Reception ==
The Santa Ynez Valley News said that the film "is a self ironic masterpiece; a genuine and informal picture of the Danish capital with emphasis on the picturesque features of everyday life in the street, at the waterfront and in merry Tivoli, the gayest spot in Europe."

It gained second place at the Cannes Film Festival in 1960. In 1961, the film was nominated for an Academy Award for "Distinctive achievement in documentary production (short subjects)".
