= Elith Foss =

Danish actor (1911–1972)

- Born: 8 August 1911; Århus, Denmark
- Died: 19 April 1972 (aged 60); Denmark
- Occupation: Actor
- Years active: 1933–1968

Elith Foss (8 August 1911 – 19 April 1972) was a Danish film actor. He appeared in 29 films between 1933 and 1968. He was born in Århus, Denmark and died in Denmark.

== Selected filmography ==
- De blaa drenge (1933)
- Blaavand melder storm (1938)
- Kampen mod uretten (1949)
- Skibet er ladet med (1960)
- Støv for alle pengene (1963)
- Summer in Tyrol (1964)
