= De tre måske fire =

1939 film

- Front cover of the Danish DVD
- Directed by: Lau Lauritzen Jr. Alice O'Fredericks
- Written by: Lau Lauritzen Jr. Børge Müller; Alice O'Fredericks
- Starring: Victor Borge
- Cinematography: Karl Andersson
- Edited by: Marie Ejlersen
- Release date: 27 February 1939
- Running time: 99 minutes
- Country: Denmark
- Language: Danish language

De tre måske fire is a 1939 Danish family film directed by Lau Lauritzen Jr. and Alice O'Fredericks.

== Cast ==
- Victor Borge as Kontorist
- Lau Lauritzen as Kontorist
- Poul Reichhardt as Kontorist
- Per Gundmann as Kontorist
- Børge Munch Petersen as Kontorchef
- Henry Gleditsch as Generaldirektør
- Betty Söderberg as Generaldirektørens forlovede
- Inge-Lise Rune as Generaldirektørens sekretær
- Erika Voigt as Generaldirektørens bogholderske
- Eigil Reimers as Generaldirektørens chauffør
- Gull-Maj Norin as En Svensk dame
- Gunnar Lauring as Hendes kompagnion
- Knud Almar as En gammel mand
- Sigurd Langberg as En tjener
