= Affæren Birte =

1945 film directed by Lau Lauritzen Jr.

- Directed by: Lau Lauritzen Jr. Alice O'Fredericks
- Written by: Svend Rindom
- Produced by: Henning Karmark
- Starring: Poul Reumert
- Cinematography: Rudolf Frederiksen
- Edited by: Marie Ejlersen
- Music by: Sven Gyldmark
- Release date: 26 February 1945
- Country: Denmark
- Language: Danish

Affæren Birte is a 1945 Danish family film directed by Lau Lauritzen Jr. and Alice O'Fredericks.

== Cast ==
- Poul Reumert - Dr.med. Hans Ellekær
- Anna Borg - Martha Ellekær
- Verna Olesen - Birte Ellekær
- Ib Schønberg - Laboratorieassistent
- Tove Grandjean - Fru Hammer
- Bente Lange - Lisbeth Hammer
- Birgit Nielsen - En veninde
- Ilselil Larsen - Anne
- Edouard Mielche - Blikkenslager Brømer
- Karl Jørgensen - Retsformand
- Per Buckhøj - Anklager
- Poul Petersen - Forsvarer
- Elith Pio - Opdagerchef
- Asbjørn Andersen - Politikommissær
- Aage Winther-Jørgensen - Professor Olesen
- Henry Nielsen - Opsynsmand
- Irwin Hasselmann - En vred herre
- Lotte Hasselmann - En vaskekone
