= Der var engang en vicevært =

1937 film

- Movie poster
- Directed by: Lau Lauritzen Jr. Alice O'Fredericks
- Written by: Lau Lauritzen Jr. Børge Müller
- Starring: Osvald Helmuth
- Cinematography: Karl Andersson
- Edited by: Marie Ejlersen
- Music by: Willy Kierulff
- Distributed by: ASA Film
- Release date: 26 December 1937
- Running time: 100 minutes
- Country: Denmark
- Language: Danish

Der var engang en vicevært is a 1937 Danish family film directed by Lau Lauritzen Jr. and Alice O'Fredericks and written by Børge Müller. The film stars Osvald Helmuth and Connie Meiling.

== Cast ==
- Osvald Helmuth ... Vicevært Christensen
- Connie Meiling ... Connie
- Victor Borge ... Komponist Bøegh ... credited as Børge Rosenbaum
- Sigurd Langberg ... Direktør Haller
- Asta Hansen ... Asta Haller
- Poul Reichhardt ... Paul
- Inger Stender ... Den lyse Inger
- Lulu Ziegler ... Sangerinden Lulu
- Sigfred Pedersen ... Digteren Sigfred
- Thorkil Lauritzen... Onkel Aksel
- Erika Voigt ... Tante Eulalia
- Bjørn Spiro ... Sagfører Birck
- Lau Lauritzen
- Tove Wallenstrøm ... Girl being picked up in the road
