= Tror du jeg er født i går! =

1941 film

- Directed by: Lau Lauritzen Jr. Alice O'Fredericks
- Written by: Lau Lauritzen Jr. Alice O'Fredericks
- Produced by: Henning Karmark
- Starring: Max Hansen
- Cinematography: Rudolf Frederiksen; Alf Schnéevoigt
- Edited by: Marie Ejlersen
- Release date: 10 March 1941
- Running time: 99 minutes
- Country: Denmark
- Language: Danish

Tror du jeg er født i går! is a 1941 Danish family film directed by Lau Lauritzen Jr. and Alice O'Fredericks.

== Cast ==
- Max Hansen as Cornelius Nielsen
- Maria Garland as Tante Emma Solberg
- Bodil Steen as Frk. Johanne Solberg
- Tove Arni as Paula
- Knud Heglund as Fætter Henrik Hahe
- Eigil Reimers as Direktør Hans Hahe
- Victor Montell as Overretssagfører Brix Jensen
- Berthe Qvistgaard as Sekretær Frk. Poulsen
- Mathilde Nielsen as Frk. Møller
- Petrine Sonne as Frk. Møller
- Karl Goos
- Erika Voigt
- Karl Jørgensen
- Thorkil Lauritzen
- Alex Suhr
- Bruno Tyron
- Helga Frier
