= I Love Another =

1946 film

- Directed by: Lau Lauritzen Jr. Alice O'Fredericks
- Written by: Grete Frische
- Produced by: Henning Karmark
- Starring: Ib Schønberg
- Cinematography: Rudolf Frederiksen
- Edited by: Marie Ejlersen; Edith Nisted Nielsen
- Music by: Sven Gyldmark
- Release date: 1946
- Running time: 87 minutes
- Country: Denmark
- Language: Danish

I Love Another (Danish: Jeg elsker en anden) is a 1946 Danish family film directed by Lau Lauritzen Jr. and Alice O'Fredericks.

== Cast ==
- Ib Schønberg - Onkel Polle
- Marguerite Viby - Annelise 'Peter' Petersen
- Ebbe Rode - John Eriksen
- Erni Arneson - Connie Smith
- Bjørn Watt-Boolsen - Læge Preben Hansen
- Betty Helsengreen - Køkkenpigen Viola
- Henry Nielsen - Taxachauffør
- Ebba Amfeldt - Smith
- Ingeborg Pehrson - Karlsen / 'Karl'
- Helga Frier - Husholderske hos frk. Smith
- Knud Heglund - Sivertsen
- Else Colber
- Astrid Holm
- Preben Kaas - Blomsterbud
- Sigrid Horne-Rasmussen
- Benny Juhlin
- Tove Maës
- Lise Thomsen
