= Snushanerne =

1936 film

- Directed by: Lau Lauritzen Jr. Alice O'Fredericks
- Written by: Lau Lauritzen Jr. Alice O'Fredericks
- Starring: Per Gundmann
- Cinematography: Carlo Bentsen
- Edited by: Edith Schlüssel
- Release date: 1 January 1936
- Country: Denmark
- Language: Danish

Snushanerne is a 1936 Danish film directed by Lau Lauritzen Jr. and Alice O'Fredericks.

== Cast ==
- Per Gundmann
- Kai Holm
- Arthur Jensen
- Sigurd Langberg
- Lau Lauritzen, Jr.
- Connie Meiling
- Carl Viggo Meincke
- Carola Merrild
- Palle Reenberg
- Eigil Reimers
- Ib Schønberg - Peter Basse
