= I dag begynder livet =

1939 film

- Directed by: Lau Lauritzen Jr. Alice O'Fredericks
- Written by: Paul Sarauw
- Produced by: Henning Karmark
- Starring: Sigfred Johansen
- Cinematography: Karl Andersson
- Edited by: Marie Ejlersen
- Release date: 26 December 1939
- Running time: 109 minutes
- Country: Denmark
- Language: Danish

I dag begynder livet is a 1939 Danish family film directed by Lau Lauritzen Jr. and Alice O'Fredericks.

== Cast ==
- Sigfred Johansen as Peter Sommer
- Berthe Qvistgaard as Korpigen Vera Holm
- Eigil Reimers as Danseinstruktør Børge Ravn
- Bodil Steen as Karin Sommer
- Ib Schønberg as Betjent Emil Lundstrøm
- Maria Garland as Johanne Lundstrøm
- Tove Arni as Korpigen Margot
- Lise Thomsen as Korpigen Nelly
- Sigrid Horne-Rasmussen as Korpigen Ditten Larsen
- Tove Wallenstrøm as Laura, chorus girl
- Per Gundmann as Pianist
- Kaj Mervild as Kriminalassistent Klitgaard
- Hans Egede Budtz as Kriminalkommisær Frederiksen
