= Olivo Krause =

Danish oboist and composer

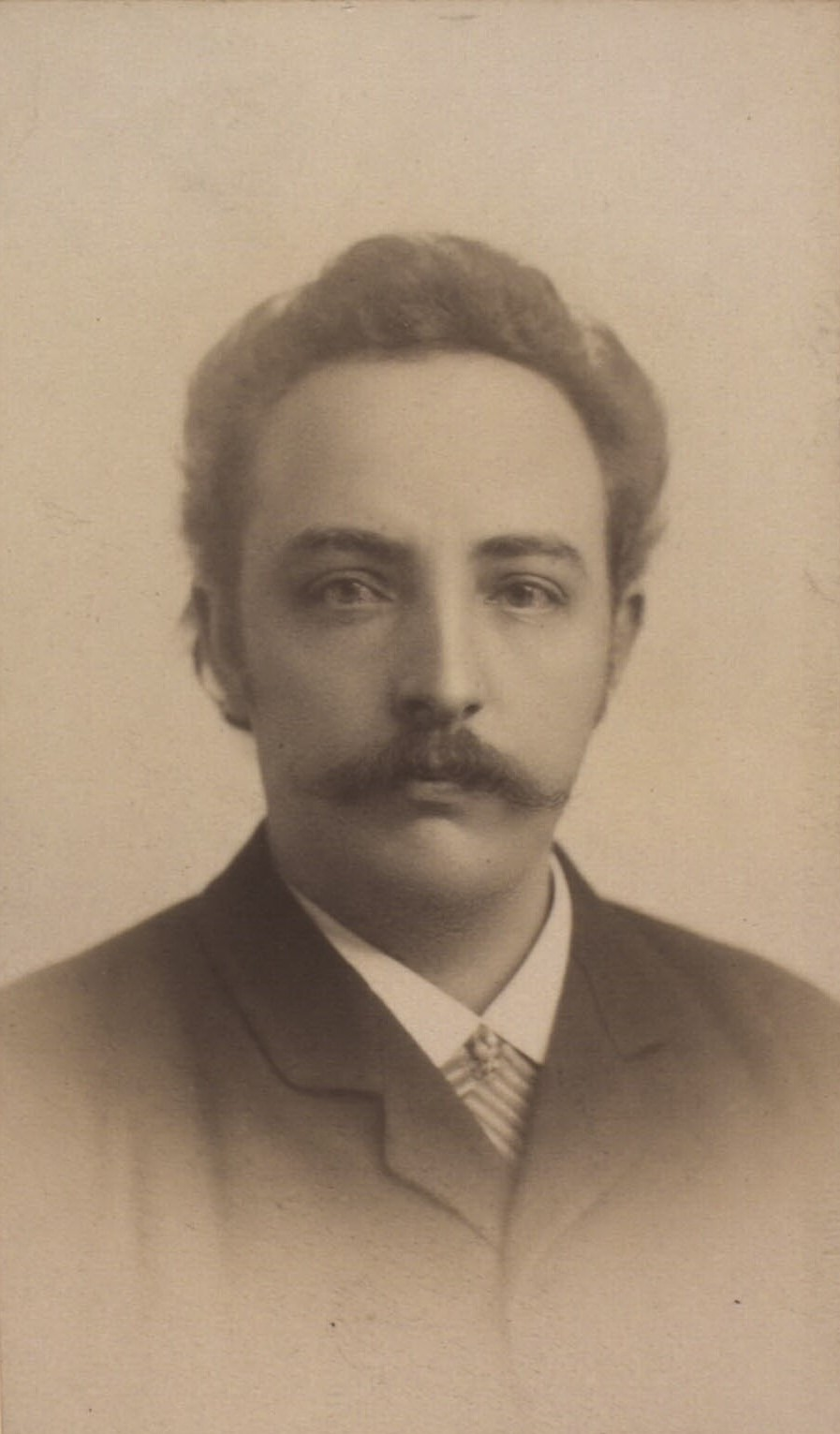
Olivo Krause

Olivo Vilhelm Eduard Oscar Krause (2 July 1857 Copenhagen, Denmark – 20 July 1927) was a Danish oboist and composer who had studied under Edmund Neupert and Agnes Adler. A member of the Royal Danish Orchestra from 1882, he became first soloist in 1893 when he also played as a soloist at the Bayreuth Festival. In 1915, he founded and played in the Olivo Krause Ensemble. Among his compositions are the opera Popoff (1912), Sonata for Violin and Piano as well as songs and piano pieces. It was for Olivo Krause that Carl Nielsen wrote the two works for oboe and piano known as Fantasy Pieces for Oboe and Piano (1890).

From 1918, Krause taught piano music at the Royal Danish Conservatory where Victor Borge was one of his students.

Married to Helga Nathalie Neubert, he had a daughter, Nathalie Krause (1884–1953), a Danish actress who featured in a number of early films.
