= Victor Borge =

Danish-American comedian and pianist (1909–2000)

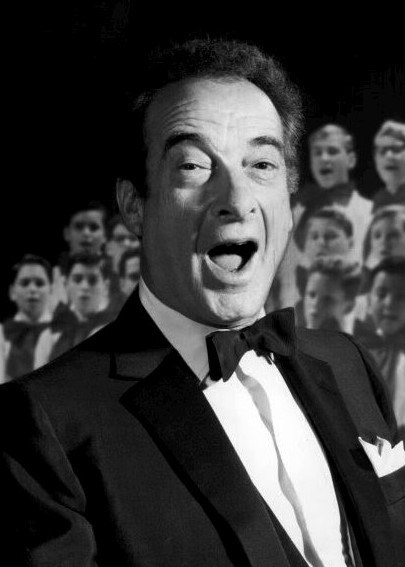
- Borge in 1968
- Born: Børge Rosenbaum; January 3, 1909; Copenhagen, Denmark
- Died: December 23, 2000 (aged 91); Greenwich, Connecticut, U.S.
- Other names: The Clown Prince of Denmark; The Unmelancholy Dane; The Great Dane
- Citizenship: Danish; American (naturalized 1948)
- Occupations: Actor; comedian; pianist
- Years active: 1917–2000
- Spouse(s): Elsie Chilton (m. 1933; div. 1953) Sarabel Sanna Scraper (m. 1953; died 2000)
- Children: 5
- Musical career
- Genres: Classical, comedy
- Instrument: Piano

Børge Rosenbaum (Danish: [ˈpɶɐ̯wə ˈʁoːsn̩pɑwm]; January 3, 1909 – December 23, 2000), known as Victor Borge (/ˈbɔːrɡə/ BOR-gə), was a Danish-American actor, comedian, and pianist who achieved great popularity in radio and television in both North America and Europe. His blend of music and comedy earned him the nicknames "The Clown Prince of Denmark," "The Unmelancholy Dane," and "The Great Dane."

== Early life and education ==
Victor Borge was born Børge Rosenbaum on January 3, 1909 in Copenhagen, Denmark, into an Ashkenazi Jewish family. His parents, Frederikke (née Lichtinger) and Bernhard Rosenbaum, were both musicians: his father a violist in the Royal Danish Orchestra, and his mother a pianist. Borge began piano lessons at the age of two, and it was soon apparent that he was a prodigy. He gave his first piano recital when he was eight years old, and in 1918 was awarded a full scholarship at the Royal Danish Academy of Music, studying under Olivo Krause. Later on, he was taught by Victor Schiøler, Liszt's student Frederic Lamond, and Busoni's pupil Egon Petri.

== Career ==
=== Early career ===
Borge played his first major concert in 1926 at the Odd Fellows Mansion concert hall. After a few years as a classical concert pianist, he started his now-famous stand-up act with the signature blend of piano music and jokes. He married the American Elsie Chilton in 1933, the same year he debuted with his revue acts. Borge started touring extensively in Europe, where he began telling anti-Nazi jokes.

When the German armed forces occupied Denmark on April 9, 1940, during World War II, Borge was playing a concert in neutral Sweden and decided to go to Finland. He traveled to America on the United States Army transport American Legion, the last neutral ship to make it out of Petsamo, Finland, and arrived 28 August 1940, with only $20 (about $460 today), with $3 going to the customs fee. Disguised as a sailor, Borge returned to Denmark once during the occupation to visit his dying mother.

=== Move to America ===
Even though Borge could not speak English upon arrival, he quickly managed to adapt his jokes to the American audience, learning English by watching movies. He took the name of Victor Borge and, in 1941, he started on Rudy Vallee's radio show. He was hired soon after by Bing Crosby for his Kraft Music Hall programme.

Borge quickly rose to fame, winning Best New Radio Performer of the Year in 1942 and earning favorable reviews for his performances at New York City's Roxy Theater and Capitol Theatre in 1943. Soon after the award, he was offered film roles with stars such as Frank Sinatra (in Higher and Higher). While hosting The Victor Borge Show on NBC beginning in 1946, he developed many of his trademarks, including repeatedly announcing his intent to play a piece but getting "distracted" by something or other, making comments about the audience, or discussing the usefulness of Chopin's "Minute Waltz" as an egg timer. He would also start out with some well-known classical piece like Beethoven's "Moonlight Sonata" and suddenly move into a pop or jazz tune, such as Cole Porter's "Night and Day" or "Happy Birthday to You".

=== Style ===
One of Borge's other famous routines was "Phonetic Punctuation," in which he read a passage from a book and added exaggerated sound effects to stand for most of the main punctuation marks, such as periods, commas, and exclamation marks. Another is his "Inflationary Language", in which he added one to every number or homophone of a number in the words he spoke. For example: "once upon a time" becomes "twice upon a time", "wonderful" becomes "twoderful", "forehead" becomes "fivehead", "anyone for tennis" becomes "anytwo five elevennis", "I ate a tenderloin with my fork, and so on and so forth" becomes "I nine an elevenderloin with my fivek, and so on and so fifth".

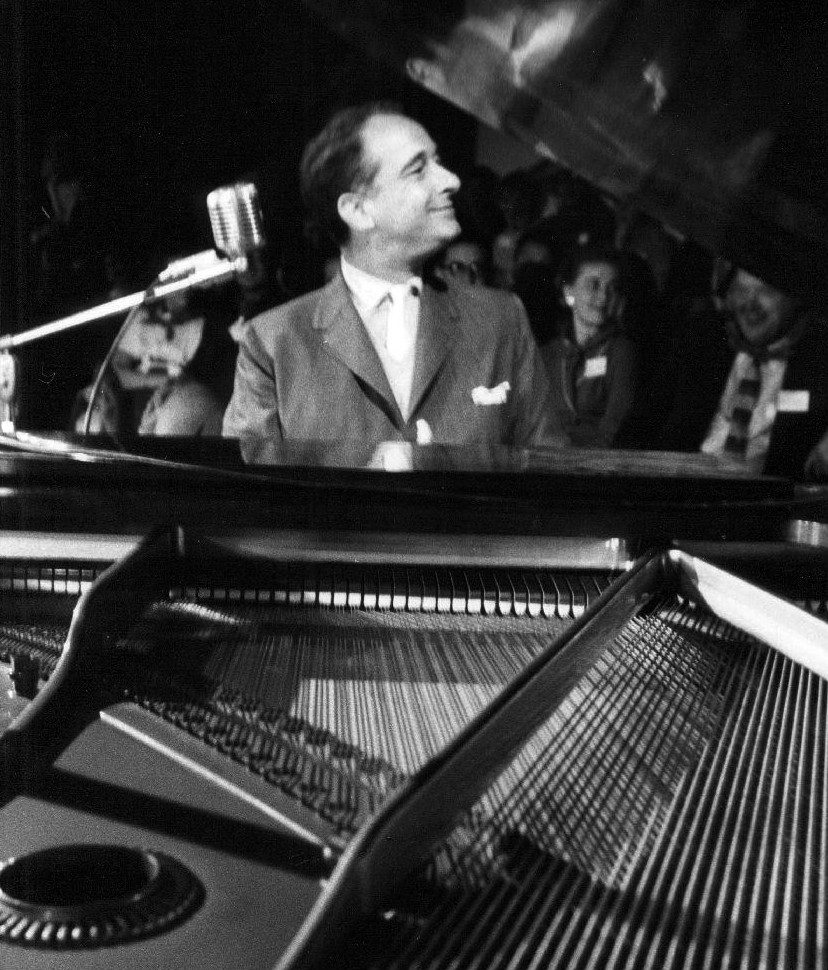
Borge performing before an audience in 1957

Borge used physical and visual elements in his live and televised performances. He would play a strange-sounding piano tune from sheet music, looking increasingly confused; turning the sheet upside down or sideways, he would then play the actual tune, flashing a joyful smile of accomplishment to the audience (he had, at first, been literally playing the tune upside down or sideways).

When his energetic playing of another song would cause him to fall off the piano bench, he would open the seat lid, take out the two ends of an automotive seat belt, and buckle himself onto the bench, "for safety". Conducting an orchestra, he might stop and order a violinist who had played a sour note to get off the stage, then resume the performance and have the other members of the section move up to fill the empty seat while they were still playing: from off stage would come the sound of a gunshot.

His musical sidekick in the 1960s, Leonid Hambro, was also a well-known concert pianist. In 1968, classical pianist Şahan Arzruni joined him as his straight man, performing together on one piano a version of Liszt's Second Hungarian Rhapsody, considered a musical-comedic classic. Borge performed a version of the routine with Rowlf the Dog on Season 4 of The Muppet Show.

He also enjoyed interacting with the audience. Seeing an interested person in the front row, he would ask them, "Do you like good music?" or "Do you care for piano music?" After an affirmative answer, Borge would take a piece of sheet music from his piano and say, "Here is some", and hand it over. After the audience's laughter died down, he would say, "That'll be $1.95" (or whatever the current price might be). He would then ask whether the audience member could read music; if the member said yes, he would ask a higher price. If he got no response from the audience after a joke, he would often add "… when this ovation has died down, of course." The delayed punchline to handing the person the sheet music would come when he would reach the end of a number and begin playing the penultimate notes over and over, with a puzzled look. He would then go back to the person in the audience, retrieve the sheet music, tear off a piece of it, stick it on the piano, and play the last couple of notes from it.

Making fun of modern theater, he would sometimes begin a performance by asking if there were any children in the audience. There always were, of course. He would sternly order them out, then say, "We do have some children in here; that means I can't do the second half in the nude. I'll wear the tie (pause). The long one (pause). The very long one, yes."

In his stage shows in later years, he would include a segment with opera singer Marylyn Mulvey. She would try to sing an aria, and he would react and interrupt, with such antics as falling off the bench in "surprise" when she hit a high note. He would also remind her repeatedly not to rest her hand on the piano, telling her that if she got used to it, "and one day a piano was not there – Fffftttt!" After the routine, the spotlight would rest on Mulvey, and she would sing a serious number with Borge accompanying in the background.

=== Later career ===
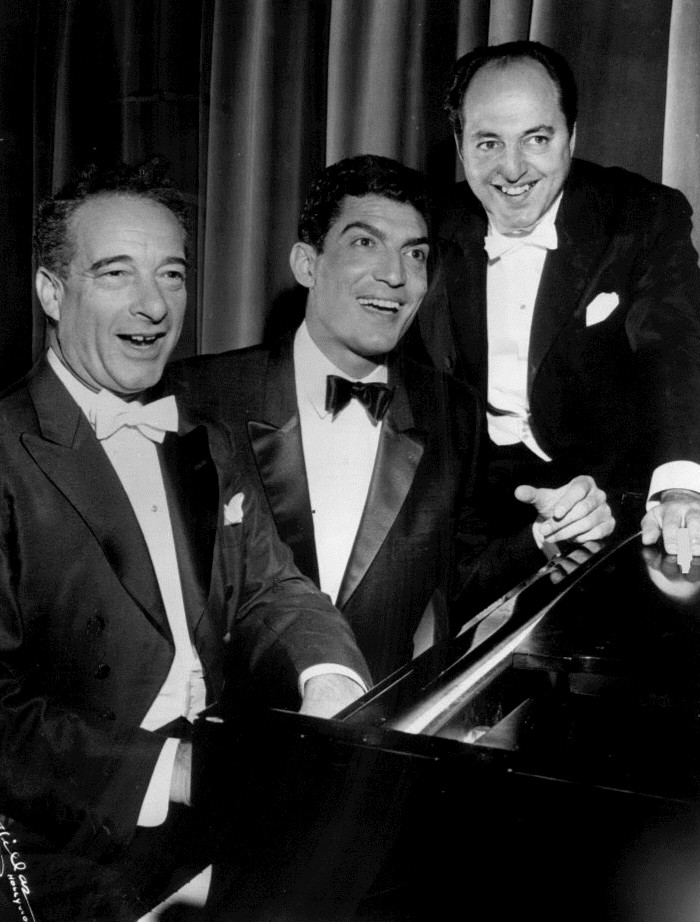
Victor Borge, Sergio Franchi, Leonid Hambro at Carnegie Hall, 1963

Borge appeared on Toast of the Town hosted by Ed Sullivan several times during 1948. He became a naturalized citizen of the United States the same year. He started the Comedy in Music show at John Golden Theatre in New York City on October 2, 1953. Comedy in Music became the longest running one-man show in the history of theater with 849 performances when it closed on January 21, 1956, a feat which placed it in the Guinness Book of World Records.

Continuing his success with tours and shows, Borge played with and conducted orchestras including the Chicago Symphony Orchestra, the New York Philharmonic and London Philharmonic. He appeared with the Cleveland Opera Company in Mozart's The Magic Flute in 1979 and at London's Royal Opera House Covent Garden in Bizet's Carmen in 1986. Always modest, he felt honored when he was invited to conduct the Royal Danish Orchestra at the Royal Danish Theatre in Copenhagen in 1992.

His later television appearances included his "Phonetic Punctuation" routine on The Electric Company in a filmed sketch. He would also use this sketch on The Electric Company's subsequent LP record, during its "Punctuation" song. In addition, he appeared several times on Sesame Street, and he was a guest star during the fourth season of The Muppet Show.

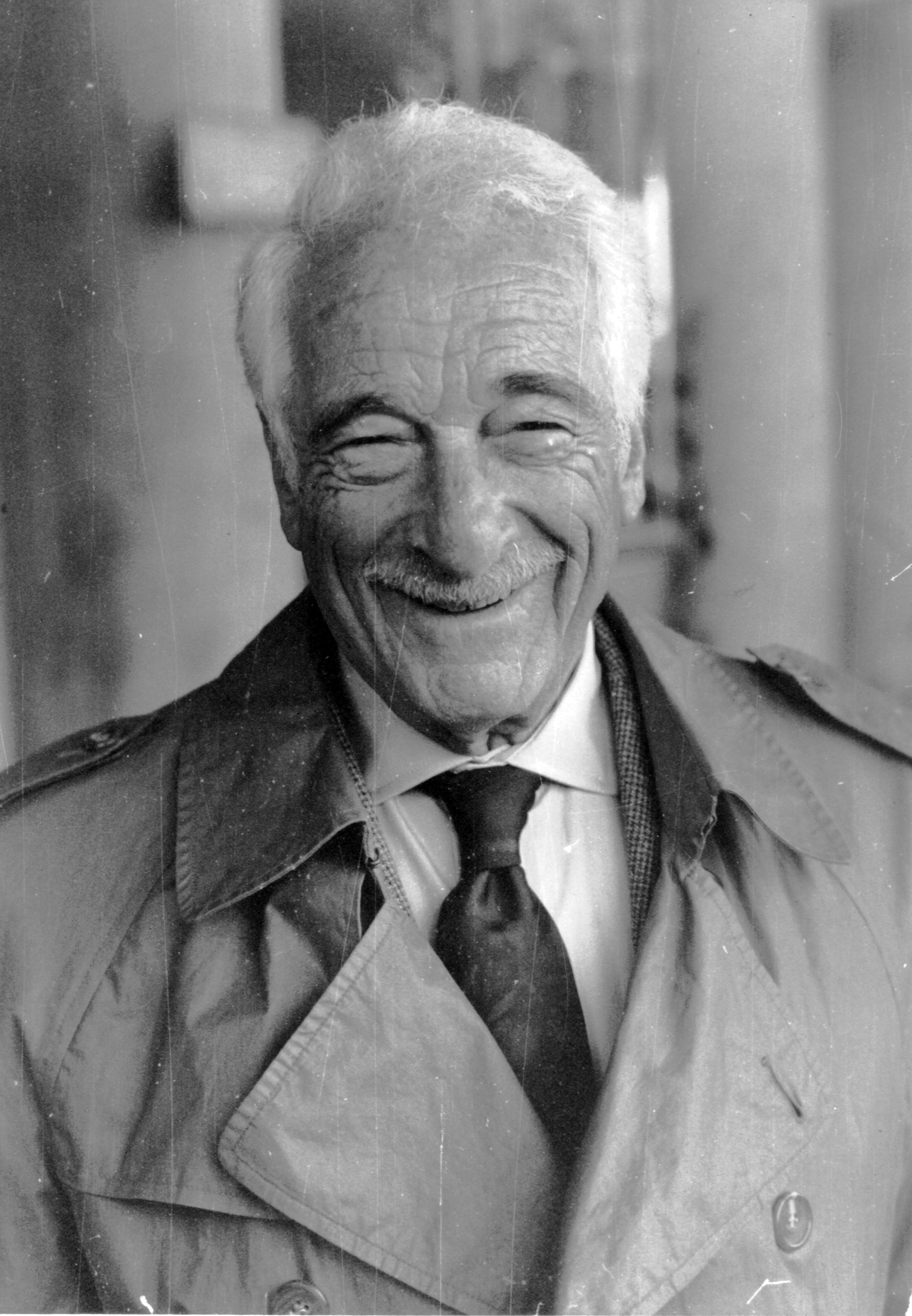
Borge in 1990

Victor Borge continued to tour until his last days, performing up to 60 times per year when he was 90 years old. His microphone of choice since circa 1982 was the Shure SM59.

=== Other endeavors ===
Borge made several appearances on the TV show What's My Line?, both as a celebrity panelist and as a contestant with the occupation "poultry farmer". (The latter was not a comedy routine: as a business venture, Borge raised and popularized Rock Cornish game hens, starting in the 1950s.)

External audio
- You may hear Victor Borge performing with Robert Sherman on WQXR-FM's "Great Artist's Series" in 1984 & 1977; Here on WQXR.org

Borge helped start several trust funds, including the Thanks to Scandinavia Fund, which was started in dedication to those who helped the Jews escape the German persecution during the war.

Aside from his musical work, Borge wrote three books: My Favorite Intermissions and My Favorite Comedies in Music (both with Robert Sherman), and the autobiography Smilet er den korteste afstand ("The Smile is the Shortest Distance") with Niels-Jørgen Kaiser.

In 1979 Borge founded the American Piano Awards (then called the Beethoven Foundation) with Julius Bloom and Anthony P. Habig. American Piano Awards now produces two major biennial piano competitions: the Classical Fellowship Awards and the Jazz Fellowship Awards.

Borge was a member of the executive committee of the Writers and Artists for Peace in the Middle East, a pro-Israel group.

== Personal life ==
Victor Borge married his first wife, Elsie Chilton, in 1933. After divorcing Elsie, he married Sarabel Sanna Scraper in 1953, and they stayed married until her death at the age of 83 in September 2000.

Borge had five children (who occasionally performed with him): Ronald Borge and Janet Crowle (adopted) with Elsie Chilton, and Sanna Feirstein, Victor Bernhard (Vebe) Jr., and Frederikke (Rikke) Borge with Sarabel.

== Death ==
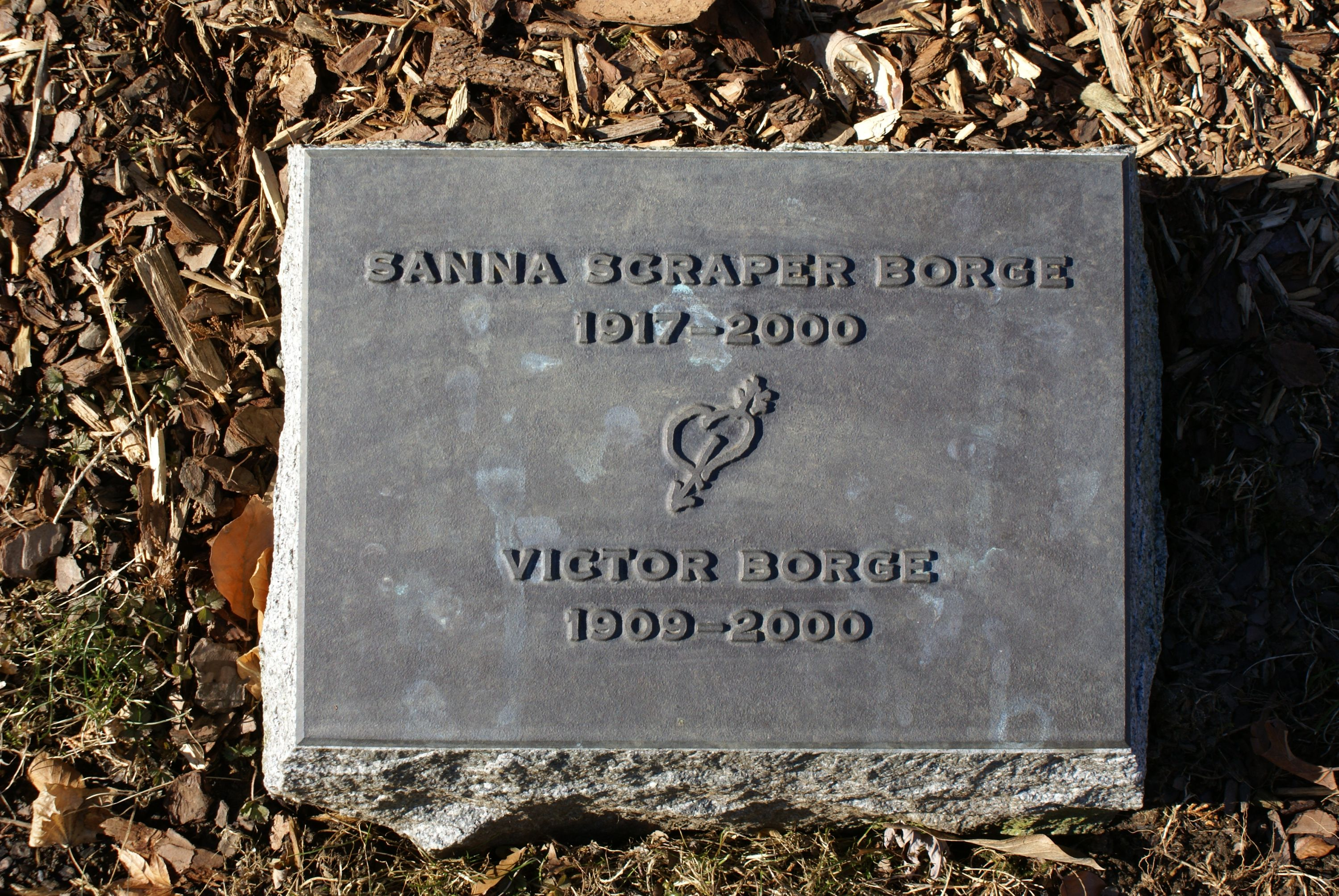
The footstone of Victor Borge

On 23 December 2000, Borge died in Greenwich, Connecticut, at the age of 91, after 75 years of entertaining. He died peacefully in his sleep a day after returning from a concert in Denmark. "It was just his time to go," Frederikke Borge said. "He's been missing my mother terribly." (His wife had died only three months earlier.) Barely a week earlier he had recorded what would be his final televised interview with Danish television, later aired on New Year's Eve. When asked where he would be spending his Christmas and New Year's, Borge responded "somewhere completely different".

In accordance with Borge's wishes, his connection to both the United States and Denmark was marked by having part of his ashes interred at Putnam Cemetery in Greenwich, with a replica of the iconic Danish statue The Little Mermaid sitting on a large rock at the grave site, and the other part in Western Jewish Cemetery (Mosaisk Vestre Begravelsesplads), in Copenhagen.

== Awards and honors ==
Borge received an honorary degree from Trinity College Connecticut in 1997. Over the years, he was also awarded an honorary Doctorate of Music from Butler University in 1970, Dana College in 1976 and the University of Connecticut in 1983. In addition, he was awarded a Doctorate of Humane Letters from Luther College in 1985.

When the Royal Danish Orchestra celebrated its 550th anniversary in 1998, Borge was appointed an honorary member — at that time one of only ten in the orchestra's history.

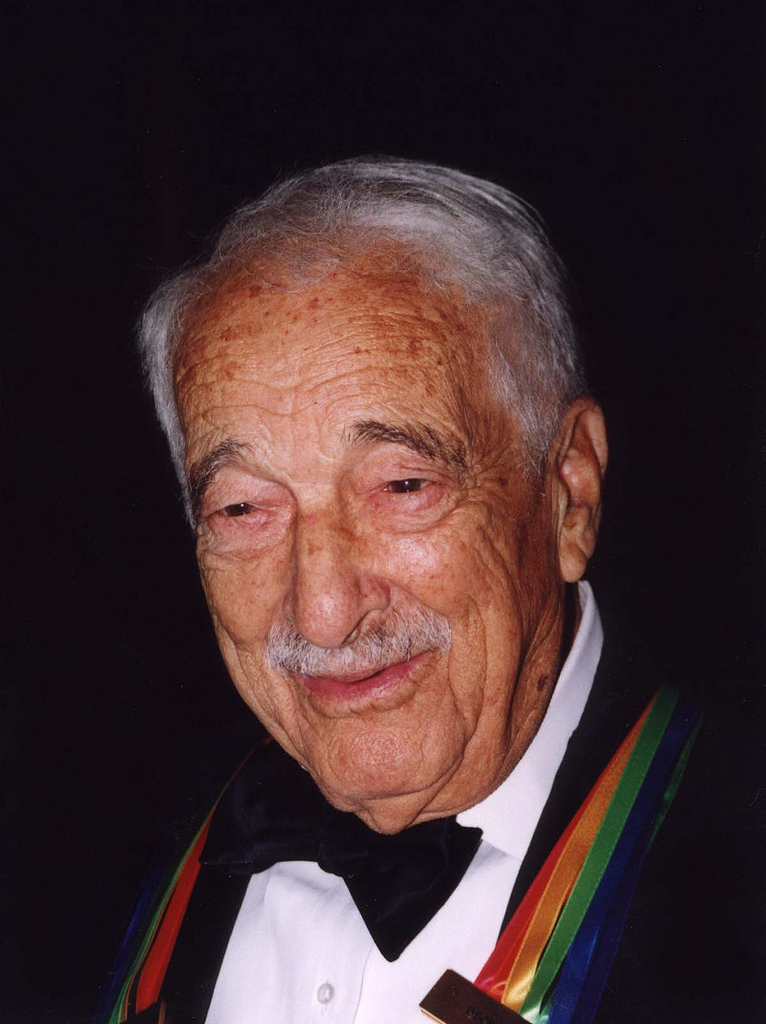
Borge with Kennedy Center Honors in 1999

Victor Borge received numerous awards and honors during the course of his career. Borge received Kennedy Center Honors in 1999. He was decorated with badges of chivalric orders by the five Nordic countries, receiving the Order of the Dannebrog (Denmark), Order of Vasa (Sweden), in 1973 the Knight First Class of the Order of St. Olav (Norway), Order of the White Rose of Finland, and the Order of the Falcon (Iceland). In 1986, he was a recipient of the Ellis Island Medal of Honor in recognition of his contributions to the improvement of American society.

== Legacy ==
Victor Borge Hall, located in Scandinavia House in New York City, was named in Borge's honor in 2000, as was Victor Borges Plads ("Victor Borge Square") in Copenhagen in 2002. In 2009, a statue celebrating Borge's centennial was erected on the square.

Asteroid (5634) Victorborge is named in his honor.

From January 23 to May 9, 2009, the life of Borge was celebrated by The American-Scandinavian Foundation with Victor Borge: A Centennial Celebration.

=== Film and television ===
On March 14, 2009, a television special about Borge's life, 100 Years of Music and Laughter, aired on PBS.

On February 7, 2017, it was reported that, according to a press release by the Danish production company M&M Productions, both a television series and cinematic film about the life of Borge were planned to be filmed in 2018.

== Filmography ==
Year	Title	Role	Notes
1937	Frk. Møllers jubilæum	Piano tuner Asmussen	
1937	Der var engang en vicevært	Composer Bøegh	
1938	Alarm	Tjener Cæsar	
1939	De tre måske fire	Kontorist – Bøjesen	
1944	Higher and Higher	Sir Victor Fitzroy Victor	
1944	The Story of Dr. Wassell	Man	Uncredited, Unbilled
1964	Victor Borge at Carnegie Hall		TV special, ABC
1966	The Daydreamer	Zenith (The Second Tailor)	Voice
1982	The King of Comedy	Victor Borge	
1989	Hanna-Barbera's 50th: A Yabba Dabba Doo Celebration	Himself	TV special, TNT

== Discography ==
External audio
- "Victor Borge Presents His Own Enchanting Version of Hans Christian Andersen", 1966
- "The Adventures of Piccolo, Saxie and Company", 1958
- "A Victor Borge Program", 1945

- Phonetic Punctuation Parts 1 and 2 (1945, Columbia Records 36911, 78 rpm)
- The Blue Serenade / A Lesson in Composition (1945, Columbia Records 36912, 78 rpm)
- Brahms' Lullaby / Grieg Rhapsody (1945, Columbia Records 36913, 78 rpm)
- A Mozart Opera by Borge / All The Things You Are (1945, Columbia Records 36914, 78 rpm)
- A Victor Borge Program (1946, Columbia Album C-111, 4 discs 78 rpm – a set containing the four previous releases)
- Unstarted Symphony / Bizet's Carmen (1947, Columbia Records 38181, 78 rpm)
- Intermezzo / Stardust (1947, Columbia Records 38182, 78 rpm)
- Rachmaninoff's Concerto No. 2 / Inflation Language (1947, Columbia Records 38183, 78 rpm)
- Clair de Lune / Vuggevise (1947, Columbia Records 38184, 78 rpm)
- An Evening with Victor Borge (1948 Columbia Album C-161, 4 discs 78 rpm – a set containing the four previous releases)
- A Victor Borge Program (1951, Columbia Records CL-6013, 10-inch LP)
- Comedy in Music, Vol. 1 (1954, Columbia Records CL-6292, 10-inch LP)
- Comedy in Music, Vol. 2 (1954, Columbia Records CL-6293, 10-inch LP)
- Comedy in Music (1954, Columbia Records CL-554, LP)
- Caught in the Act (1955, Columbia Records CL-646, LP)
- Brahms, Bizet and Borge (1955, Columbia Records CL-2538, 10-inch LP)
- ½ Time På Dansk (1958, Fona 251 HI-FI, 10-inch LP)
- The Adventures of Piccolo, Saxie and Company (1959, Columbia Records CL-1223, LP)
- The Adventures of Piccolo, Saxie and Company (1959, Coronet KLP 762, LP (AUS))
- Victor Borge Plays and Conducts Concert Favorites (1959, Columbia Records CL-1305/CS-8113, LP)
- Borge's Back (1962, MGM E/SE-3995P, LP)
- Borge's Back (1962, MGM CS-6055, LP (UK))
- Borgering on Genius (1962, MGM 2354029, LP – same material as Borge's Back)
- Great Moments of Comedy (1964, Verve V/V6 15044, LP – same material as Borge's Back)
- Victor Borge presents his own enchanting version of Hans Christian Andersen (1966, Decca DL7-34406 Stereo, LP)
- Comedy in Music (1972, CBS S 53140, LP)
- Victor Borge at His Best (1972, PRT Records COMP 5, 2 LPs)
- Victor Borge Live At The London Palladium (1972, Pye NSPL 18394, LP)
- My Favorite Intervals (1975, PYE NSPD 502, LP)
- 13 Pianos Live in Concert (1975, Telefunken-Decca LC-0366)
- Victor Borge 50 Års Jubilæum (1976, Philips 6318035, LP)
- Victor Borge Show (1977, CBS 70082, LP, in Danish)
- Victor Borge Live in der Hamburger Musikhalle (1978, Philips 6305 369, LP)
- Victor Borge Live (1978, Starbox LX 96 004 Stereo, LP)
- Victor Borge – Live(!) (1992, Sony Broadway 48482, CD)
- The Piano & Humor of the Great Victor Borge (1997, Sony Music Special Products 15312, 3 CDs)
- The Two Sides of Victor Borge (1998, GMG Entertainment, CD)
- Caught in the Act (1999, Collectables Records 6031, CD)
- Comedy in Music (1999, Collectables Records 6032, CD)
- Phonetically Speaking – And Don't Forget The Piano (2001, Jasmine 120, CD)
- En aften med Victor Borge (2003, UNI 9865861, CD)
- I Love You Truly (2004, Pegasus (Pinnacle) 45403, CD)
- Victor Borge King of Comedy (2006, Phantom 26540, CD)
- Verdens morsomste mand: alle tiders Victor Borge (2006, UNI 9877560, CD)
- Unstarted Symphony (2008, NAX-8120859, CD)
- Comedy in Music (2009, SHO-227, CD)
