= Lau Lauritzen Jr. =

Danish actor (1910–1977)

- Promotional Photo of Lauritzen for the 1935 film Weekenden
- Born: 26 June 1910; Vejle, Denmark
- Died: 12 May 1977 (aged 66); Copenhagen, Denmark
- Occupations: Actor, director, studio head, screenwriter
- Years active: 1931–1965
- Spouse: Lisbeth Movin
- Awards: Bodil Award; 1949 Støt står den danske sømand Bodil Award; 1951 Café Paradis Bodil Award; 1952 Det Sande Ansigt Bodil Award; 1954 Farlig Ungdom Palme d'Or; 1946 De Røde Enge

Lau Lauritzen Jr. (26 June 1910 – 12 May 1977), was a Danish actor, screenwriter, and film director. As a director, he was a 4-time recipient of the Bodil Award for Best Danish Film. Lauritzen co-founded the Danish film studio ASA Film and served as the studio's artistic director (1937–1945) and administrative director (1945–1964).

== Career ==
Lau Lauritzen Jr. was born 26 June 1910 in Vejle, Denmark, the son of silent film actor and director Lau Lauritzen Sr. He pursued an education in the film industry by working at film studios in England, Germany, France, and Belgium. After returning to Denmark, he worked for his father at Palladium Film productions in multiple positions including screenwriter, cameraman, soundman, and director's assistant. In 1934, Lauritzen made his acting debut in the comedy Barken Margrethe. Earlier that same year, before he was 24 years old, Lauritzen made his directorial debut with the 1934 farcical comedy, Ud I den kold sne (Out in the Cold Snow). Lauritzen co-directed the film with Alice O'Fredericks who had also been working as a director's assistant for Lauritzen's father at Palladium. The Lauritzen-O'Fredericks partnership flourished and they eventually made 27 films together during the 1930s and 1940s.

In 1937, Lauritzen, along with director John Olsen and Henning Karmark, established the ASA Film studio, where Lauritzen worked as the company's artistic director. At ASA, he often co-directed films, notably with the leading women directors Alice O'Fredericks and Bodil Ipsen. During the years of German occupation in World War II, Lauritzen directed 22 films through ASA Film. In 1946, Lauritzen shared with Ipsen the Palme d'Or at the Cannes Film Festival for their film The Red Meadows (De røde enge) which told about Danish resistance fighters during the German occupation. The film starred Lauritzen's new wife, Lisbeth Movin, whom he had married the previous year.

Lauritzen shared with Ipsen the Bodil Award for Best Danish Film three times: In 1949, for Støt står den danske sømand (The Viking Watch of the Danish Seaman) which also starred both Lauritzen and Movin; in 1951, for Café Paradis (Paradise Cafe), which has received praise as a Danish "masterpiece"; and in 1952, for Det Sande Ansigt (The True Face), a taut psychological thriller which starred Lauritzen as an architect wrongly accused of rape and murder. In 1954, Lauritzen was again awarded the Bodil Award, this time as the sole director for his crime drama Farlig Ungdom (Dangerous Youth). Lauritzen's four Bodils for Best Danish film was a record that would stand more than forty years until Lars von Trier in 1997 received his fourth Best Danish Film Bodil for Breaking the Waves.

From 1945 until 1965, Lauritzen was the administrative director of ASA Film. He directed and produced his final film, Me and My Kid Brother and Doggie in 1969. During his career, Lauritzen directed 64 films, acted in 27 movies, and wrote 25 produced screenplays. Lauritzen died on 12 May 1977 and is buried in Hørsholm church cemetery.

== Personal life ==
Lauritzen was married for the first time to Nina Borthen, the daughter of a Norwegian shipping magnate. He married the second time on 30 January 1945 to the Danish actress Lisbeth Movin. Lauritzen is the father of the actress Lone Lau.

== Filmography ==
=== Director ===
- Ud i den kolde sne (1934)
- Kidnapped (1935)
- Week-end (1935)
- Snushanerne (1936)
- Panserbasse (1936)
- Cirkusrevyen 1936 1936 (1936)
- En fuldendt gentleman (1937)
- Frk. Møllers jubilæum (1937)
- Der var engang en vicevært (1937)
- Alarm (1938)
- Julia jubilerar (1938)
- Life on the Hegn Farm (1938)
- Blaavand melder storm (1938)
- De tre måske fire (1939)
- Nordhavets mænd (1939)
- I dag begynder livet (1939)
- Familien Olsen (1940)
- Västkustens hjältar (1940)
- Pas på svinget i Solby (1940)
- En desertør (1940)
- En ganske almindelig pige (1940)
- Niels Pind og hans dreng (1941)
- Tror du jeg er født i går! (1941)
- Far skal giftes (1941)
- Frøken Kirkemus (1941)
- Afsporet (1942)
- Søren Søndervold (1942)
- Frk. Vildkat (1942)
- Hans onsdagsveninde (1943)
- Det ender med bryllup (1943)
- Jeg mødte en morder (1943)
- Frihed, lighed og Louise (1944)
- Rejsefeber (1944)
- Dansk sport i småglimt (1944)
- Bedstemor går amok (1944)
- Affæren Birte (1945)
- Panik i familien (1945)
- Klingende toner (1945)
- De kloge og vi gale (1945)
- The Red Meadows (1945)
- I Love Another (1946)
- The Swedenhielm Family (1947)
- Når katten er ude (1947)
- Lise kommer til Byen (1947)
- I Love You Karlsson (1947)
- Røverne fra Rold (1947)
- The Viking Watch of the Danish Seaman (1948)
- Vi vil ha' et barn (1949)
- Den opvakte jomfru (1950)
- Café Paradis (1950) ... a.k.a. Cafe Paradise
- Det Sande Ansigt (1951)
- Vejrhanen (1952)
- Farlig Ungdom (1953)
- En sømand går i land (1954)
- Taxa K 1640 efterlyses (1956)
- Danmarks konge (1957)
- The Richest Girl in the World
- Sømand i knibe (1960)
- Min kone fra Paris (1961)
- Rikki og mændene (1962)
- Jensen længe leve (1965)
- Mig og min lillebror (1967)
- Mig og min lillebror og storsmuglerne (1968)
- Me and My Kid Brother and Doggie (1969)

=== Actor ===
- Sømand i knibe (1960) .... Admiral
- Taxa K 1640 efterlyses (1956) .... Jacob Svendsen
- En Sømand går i land (1954) .... Frederik Larsen
- Det Sande Ansigt (1951) .... Architect Troels Rolff
- Café Paradis (1950) .... Psychologist Ivers
- The Viking Watch of the Danish Seaman (1948) .... Kaj Frische .
- Værelse søges (1948) .... Narrator
- I Love You Karlsson (1947) .... Karlsson Jr.
- Lise kommer til Byen (1947) .... Film Director Hans Berg
- De røde enge (1945) .... Toto
- Den Usynlige Hær (1945) .... German Defender
- Afsporet (1942)
- Tag til Rønneby Kro (1941) .... Attorney
- En Ganske almindelig pige (1940) .... Filmmaker Poul Hansen
- Nordhavets mænd (1939) .... Sigurd Jernø
- Tre måske fire, De (1939) .... Officed Worker
- Blaavand melder Storm (1938) .... Svend Larsen
- Julia jubilerar (1938) .... Erik Kruse
- Alarm (1938) .... Jess Clark
- Der var engang en vicevært (1937)
- Frk. Møllers jubilæum (1937) .... Engineer Peter Juhl
- Fuldendt gentleman, En (1937) .... Baron Henrik Falkenstjerne
- Panserbasse (1936)
- Snushanerne (1936)
- Week-end (1935) .... Poul
- Barken Margrethe (1934) .... First Mate Poul Hansen
- Ud i den kolde sne (1934)

=== Writer ===
- Danmarks konge (1957)
- Klingende toner (1945)
- Bedstemor går amok (1944)
- Tror du jeg er født i Gaar! (1941)
- Västkustens hjältar (1940)
- De Tre måske fire (1939)
- Blaavand melder Storm (1938)
- Julia jubilerar (1938)
- Alarm (1938)
- Der var engang en vicevært (1937)
- Frk. Møllers jubilæum (1937)
- Panserbasse (1936)
- Snushanerne (1936)
- Week-end (1935)
- Kidnapped (1935/I)
- Barken Margrethe (1934)
- Ud i den kolde sne (1934)
- Københavnere (1933)
- Med fuld musik (1933)
- Han, hun og Hamlet (1932)
- I kantonnement (1932)
- Krudt med knald (1931)
- Pas paa pigerne (1930)
- Hr. Tell og søn (1930)
- Højt paa en kvist (1929)

== Sources ==
- Piil, Morten Danske Skuespillere, Gyldendal, 2003
