= Victor Cornelius =

Danish composer, pianist, and singer

Victor Cornelius (22 September 1897 – 9 May 1961) was a Danish composer, pianist, and singer, born in Copenhagen.

He is best known for his songs Toner fra himlen, Tre røde roser, Lille kammerat, Tak for gode som for onde år, I en sal på hospitalet and Mor er den bedste i verden. Cornelius also sung the first Danish-language version of "When You Wish Upon a Star" in the 1940 version of Pinocchio.

Cornelius also composed for a number of films including:

- Alle går rundt og forelsker sig
- Med fuld musik
- Snushanerne
