= John Fawcett =

John Fawcett may refer to:

== In the arts ==
- John Fawcett (actor died 1793), British actor
- John Fawcett (actor) (1768–1837), his son, English actor and playwright
- John Fawcett (director) (born 1968), Canadian director of film and television
- John Fawcett (of Bolton) (1789–1867), composer/musician
- John Fawcett (organist) (1825–1857), his son, English organist

== Other people ==
- John Fawcett (entrepreneur) (born 1977), American technology businessman
- John Fawcett (humanitarian) (died 2017), founder of the John Fawcett Foundation in Bali, 2003 winner of the John Curtin Medal
- John Fawcett (surgeon) (1866–1944), English surgeon
- John Fawcett (theologian) (1739–1817), British theologian, pastor and hymn writer
- John C. Fawcett (1859–1908), American Boston harbor pilot

== See also ==
- John M. Faucette, American science fiction writer
- John Fawcett Gordon (1879–1965), politician in Northern Ireland
