= Fawcett (surname) =

Fawcett is an English surname. Notable people with the surname include:

- A. Chase Fawcett (1863–1934), Canadian politician.
- Benjamin Fawcett (1808–1893), English woodblock colour printer
- Brian Fawcett (1944–2022), Canadian poet and novelist
- Cesar Fawcett (born 1983), Colombian footballer
- Charles Fawcett (historian), British historian
- Charles Bungay Fawcett (1883–1952), British geographer
- Charles Fernley Fawcett (1915–2008), U.S. soldier, actor, and co-founder of the International Medical Corps
- Charlotte Fawcett (1942–2021), British artist, mother of British Prime Minister Boris Johnson
- David Fawcett (born 1963), Australian politician
- Edward Fawcett (disambiguation), several persons with the name
- Eric Fawcett (1927–2000), British-Canadian physicist
- Farrah Fawcett (1947–2009), U.S. actress
- Fausto Fawcett (born 1957), Brazilian singer-songwriter, writer, playwright, journalist, actor and screenwriter
- Henry Fawcett (1833–1884), British economist and politician
- J. Malcolm Fawcett (1855–1924), English entomologist who specialised in Lepidoptera
- James Edmund Sandford Fawcett (1913–1991), Barrister and member of the European commission for human rights
- Joan Fawcett (1937–2015), Canadian politician
- John Fawcett (actor) (1768–1837), English actor and playwright
- John Fawcett (of Bolton) (1789–1867), English composer
- Joseph Fawcett (1758–1804), English Presbyterian minister and poet
- Joy Fawcett (born 1968), American soccer player
- Kim Fawcett, American politician
- Michael Fawcett (born 1962), British courtier
- Millicent Fawcett (1847–1929), British feminist
- Nicole Fawcett (born 1986), American volleyball player and coach
- Norman Fawcett (1910–1997), Canadian politician
- Novice Gail Fawcett (1909–1998), American academic administrator
- Percy Fawcett (1867 – c. 1925), British archaeologist and explorer
- Philippa Fawcett (1868–1948), British mathematician and educator
- Quinn Fawcett, pen name of a pair of authors, Chelsea Quinn Yarbro and Bill Fawcett
- Ron Fawcett (born 1955), English rock climber
- Ruth Fawcett (born 1961), Canadian physicist
- Sarah Fawcett, South African oceanographer
- Taylor Fawcett (born 1993), British actor
- Theodore Fawcett (1832–1898), Australian settler and politician
- Vince Fawcett (1970–2026), English professional rugby league footballer
- Wilford Fawcett (1885–1940), American publisher
- William Fawcett (disambiguation), several persons with the name

== See also ==
- Fawcett (disambiguation)
