= Kuikuro (disambiguation) =

The Kuikuro are an indigenous people of Brazil.

Kuikuro may also refer to:

- Kuikuro language
- Kuikúro-Kalapálo language, or Amonap
