= Fawcett =

Fawcett may refer to:

== People ==
- Fawcett (surname)

== English gentry family ==
- Fawcett family (of Sandford Hall, of Shibden Hall, of Scaleby Castle), an English family from Yorkshire

== English musical family ==
- Fawcett (musical family), several generations of English orchestral players from Yorkshire

== Places ==
- Fawcett, Alberta, a hamlet in Alberta, Canada

== Other uses ==
- Fawcett City, a fictional DC Comics city
- Fawcett Publications, an American publishing company
  - Fawcett Comics, a division of Fawcett Publications
- Fawcett Society, an organisation in the United Kingdom that campaigns for women's rights
- Fawcett Stadium
