= Psi Hydrae =

Binary star system in the constellation Hydra

Observation data Epoch J2000.0 Equinox J2000.0 (ICRS)
- Constellation: Hydra
- Right ascension: 13^{h} 09^{m} 03.27026^{s}
- Declination: −23° 07′ 05.0501″
- Apparent magnitude (V): 4.97

Characteristics
- Spectral type: K0 III
- U−B color index: +0.95
- B−V color index: +1.05

Astrometry
| Radial velocity (R_{v}) | −17.2±0.6 km/s |
| Proper motion (μ) | RA: −20.08 mas/yr Dec.: −39.81 mas/yr |
| Parallax (π) | 14.09±0.48 mas |
| Distance | 231 ± 8 ly (71 ± 2 pc) |
| Absolute magnitude (M_{V}) | +0.54 |

Details
| Radius | 10.6 R_{☉} |
| Luminosity | 56 L_{☉} |
| Surface gravity (log g) | 2.72 cgs |
| Temperature | 4,680 K |
| Metallicity [Fe/H] | −0.19±0.04 dex |

Other designations
- ψ Hya, 45 Hydrae, BD−22°3515, HD 114149, HIP 64166, HR 4958, SAO 181410

Database references
| SIMBAD | data |

Psi Hydrae (ψ Hydrae) is a star system in the equatorial constellation of Hydra. Based upon an annual parallax shift of 14.09 mas as seen from Earth, it is located around 231 light years away from the Sun. It is faintly visible to the naked eye with an apparent magnitude of 4.97.

== System ==
This is a probable astrometric binary system. The primary, component A, is an evolved giant star with a stellar classification of K0 III. It is a red clump star that is generating energy through the fusion of helium at its core. The measured angular diameter is 1.39±0.02 mas, which, at the estimated distance of Psi Hydrae, yields a physical size of about 10.6 times the radius of the Sun. It is radiating 56 times the solar luminosity from its photosphere at an effective temperature of 4,680. K.

== Cultural significance ==
The Kalapalo people of Mato Grosso state in Brazil called this star and β Hya Kafanifani.
