= Beta Hydrae =

Double star in the constellation Hydra

β Hydrae
- Location of β Hydrae (circled)

Observation data Epoch J2000.0 Equinox J2000.0 (ICRS)
- Constellation: Hydra
- Right ascension: 11^{h} 52^{m} 54.52149^{s}
- Declination: −33° 54′ 29.2672″
- Apparent magnitude (V): 4.29 (combined) (4.67 + 5.47)

Characteristics
- Spectral type: B9IIIp Si + ? kB8hB8HeA0VSi
- U−B color index: −0.34
- B−V color index: −0.100±0.003
- R−I color index: −0.08
- Variable type: α^{2} CVn

Astrometry
Radial velocity (R_{v})	−1.0±3.7 km/s
Proper motion (μ)	RA: −56.56 mas/yr Dec.: +0.19 mas/yr
Parallax (π)	10.53±0.60 mas
Distance	310 ± 20 ly (95 ± 5 pc)
Absolute magnitude (M_{V})	−0.59

Details

A
Mass	3.36±0.15 M_{☉}
Radius	3.89±0.08 R_{☉}
Luminosity	257+45 −38 L_{☉}
Surface gravity (log g)	2.52±0.03 cgs
Temperature	10,980±110 K
Rotation	2.35666±0.00002 d
Age	178+62 −12 Myr

B
Mass	~3 M_{☉}

Other designations
- Beta Hydrae, Beta Hya, HJ 4478AB, β Hya, CD−33°8018, CPD−33°3159, GC 16258, HD 103192, HIP 57936, HR 4552, SAO 202901, PPM 289465, CCDM J11529-3354AB, WDS 11529-3354AB

Database references
SIMBAD	data
- A
- B

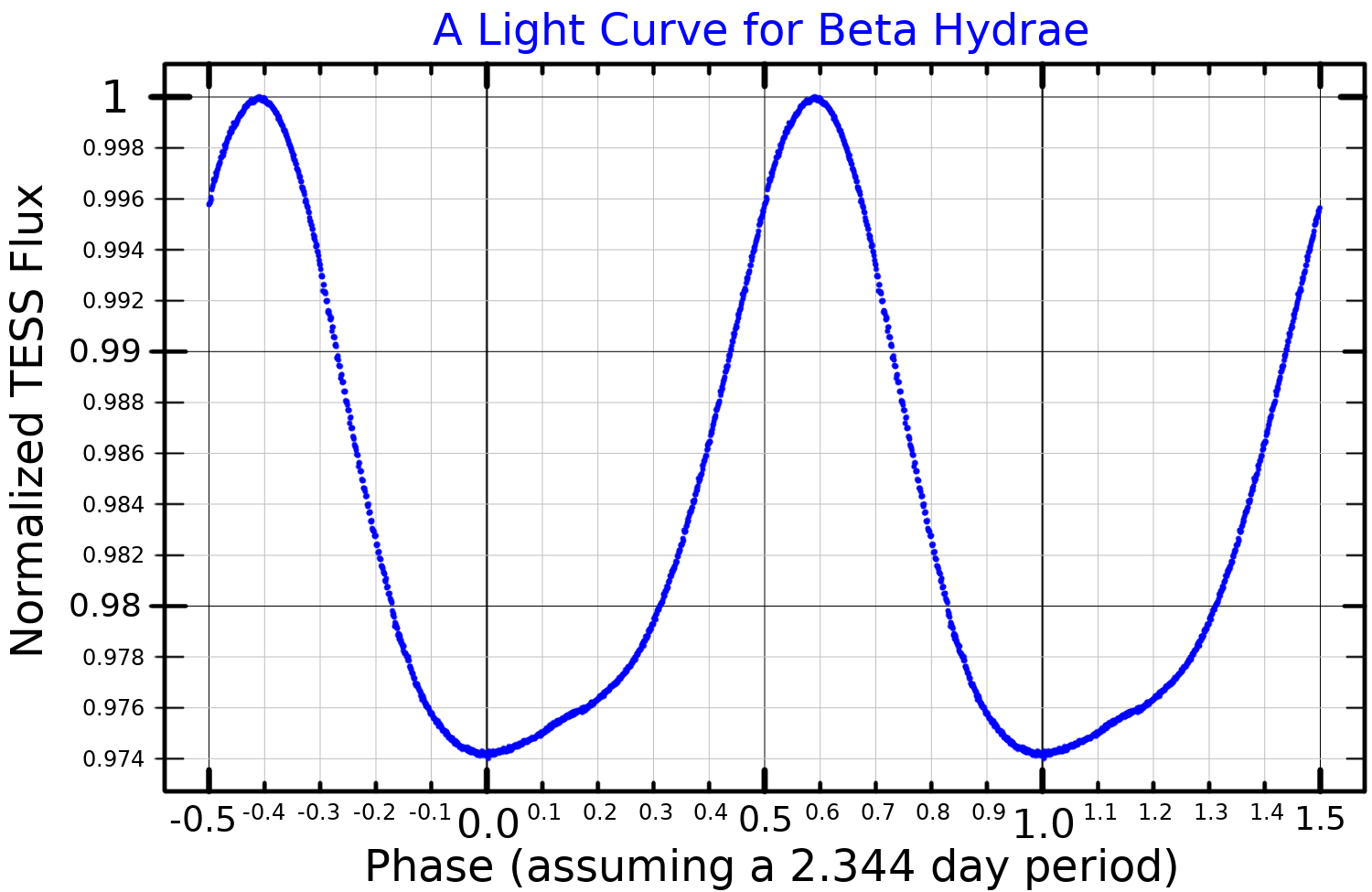
light curve for Beta Hydrae plotted from TESS data

Beta Hydrae, Latinized from β Hydrae, is a double star in the equatorial constellation of Hydra. Historically, Beta Hydrae was designated 28 Crateris, but the latter fell out of use when the IAU defined the permanent constellation boundaries in 1930. The system is faintly visible to the naked eye with a combined apparent visual magnitude that ranges around 4.29. It is located at a distance of approximately 310 light years from the Sun based on parallax.

The double nature of this system was first reported by English astronomer John Herschel in 1834. The brighter primary, designated component A, has an average visual magnitude of 4.67, while the secondary, component B, is of magnitude 5.47. As of 2002, the secondary is located at an angular separation of 0.65 arcseconds from the primary, along a position angle of 28.5°.

The brighter component is an α^{2} Canum Venaticorum variable that changes in brightness with a period of 2.344 days and an amplitude of 0.04 in visual magnitude. It is a magnetic chemically-peculiar star with an average quadratic field strength of (−206±68)×10^{−4} T. The star is around 178 million years old with 3.4 times the mass of the Sun and 3.9 times the Sun's radius. On average, it is radiating 257 times the luminosity of the Sun from its photosphere at an effective temperature of 10,980 K.

In 1972, M. R. Molnar found a stellar classification of B9IIIp Si for β Hydrae A, showing an abundance anomaly for silicon. R. F. Garrison and R. O. Gray assigned it a class of kB8hB8HeA0VSi in 1994. This notation indicates the Calcium K line matches a star of class B8, the hydrogen lines also match a B8 spectrum, while the helium lines match an A-type main-sequence star of class A0V. They noted that the hydrogen lines have "curious rounded profiles". Later studies list abundance anomalies of silicon, chromium, and strontium.

== Cultural significance ==
The Kalapalo people of Mato Grosso state in Brazil called β Hydrae and ψ Hya Kafanifani.
