= Edward Fawcett =

Edward Fawcett may refer to:

- Edward Fawcett (anatomist) (1867–1942), British anatomist
- Edward Fawcett (conservationist) (1920–2013), British conservationist
- Edward Fawcett (cricketer) (1839–1884), British army officer and English cricketer
- Edward Douglas Fawcett (1866–1960), English mountaineer, philosopher and novelist
- M. Edward Fawcett (1865–1935), American bishop
