= Fawcett (musical family) =

Musical family of orchestral players active in the UK in the 1800s and 1900s

The Fawcett musical family, most active in 19th and early 20th century England, came from Yorkshire. At least 36 professional orchestral players were the descendants of John Fawcett of Tadcaster (c.1770-1855) and his wife Elizabeth Cowell (1772-1845) in the West Riding of Yorkshire. They were often named after composers and included many amateur musicians as well as full professionals. The family became well known all over the North of England, but none rose to national eminence. Some were members of the Carl Rosa Opera Company, The Hallé and Queen's Hall Orchestras, others toured regularly, performing with spa and resort orchestras (Llandudno, Douglas, Saltburn, Blackpool) and participated in chamber music concerts.

== Family members ==
- William Fawcett (1812-1879) was born in Chapel Allerton and married Martha Smith. He died in Horsforth.
  - Benjamin was a violinist and music teacher.
    - William (cello, bass, born 1864).
      - Verdi (cello).
      - Arthur (violin).
    - John (bass player at the Grand Theatre, Leeds, born 1869).
      - Harold Rossini (sub-principal bassist of the London Philharmonic Orchestra in the 1950s).
      - Elgar Arnold (bass).
- Thomas Fawcett (1815–98) worked as a weaver in Horsforth. In 1840 he moved to Eccleshill where he became involved with the New Connexion Chapel. He sang tenor in the choir and became choirmaster, also playing violin and cello. He was singing with the Bradford Festival Choral Society when it appeared before Queen Victoria at Buckingham Palace in June 1858.
  - Mary Fawcett (born 1833–4) married Sam Fawcett Midgley, a bassoonist.
  - John Fawcett (1837–1919) was an alto trombonist.
    - Harry (violin).
      - Norman was a bassoonist.
    - Mendelssohn (clarinetist, 1869–1940, played at Covent Garden Opera, was deputy conductor, Scarborough Spa Orchestra),
      - Frederick was a clarinetist.
      - Derek was a player in the Spa Orchestra.
    - Handel (trombone, born 1875).
    - William (double bass).
    - Tom (flute).
      - Reginald was a cellist.
  - Samuel Fawcett (1837–1898) was a bass trombonist, Bradford Permanent Orchestra.
    - Charlesworth (clarinet, played at Crystal Palace).
    - Verdi (violin, played with Thomas Beecham from 1907).
    - Weber (oboe, Riviere Orchestra, Llandudno, and The Hallé, born 1874).
      - Weber Fawcett had an oboist son.
  - Joseph Fawcett (1840–1915) was a tenor trombonist, organist, choral and brass band conductor (including three years conducting the Black Dyke Band).
    - Charles (violin, born 1871).
    - Herbert (trombone).
    - Haydn, violinist The Hallé, Queen's Hall Orchestra; conductor, Haydn Fawcett and his Orchestra, 1930s.
  - Thomas Fawcett (1852–????) was a pianist and organist.
  - Handel Fawcett (1861–1940) played the double bass and was one of the first members of the Bournemouth Municipal Orchestra.

== The Lancashire Fawcetts ==
The Lancashire composer John Fawcett (1789–1867) and his son John Fawcett (1824–1857), appear to be unrelated. Fawcett senior was a composer and writer, born in Kendal, who taught music in Bolton and composed sacred music and hymns. His son was a composer and organist born in Bolton. He composed anthems, glees, songs and piano music.

== See also ==
- List of musical families (classical music)
- Grimson (musical family)
- Fawcett family
