= William Fawcett =

William or Bill Fawcett or variation, may refer to:

== People ==
- William Fawcett (actor) (1894–1974), American actor who was awarded the Légion d'honneur
- William Fawcett (author) (1902–1941), English journalist and writer on horses, hunting, and racing
- William Fawcett (botanist) (1851–1926), British botanist and co-author of the Flora of Jamaica
- William Fawcett (British Army officer) (1727–1804), former Adjutant-General to the Forces
- William Fawcett (engineer) (1763–1844), British engineer and manufacturer of guns and steam engines
- Bill Fawcett (footballer) (1890–1970), Australian rules footballer for Melbourne
- Bill Fawcett (writer) (born 1947), mystery and science-fiction author and editor who also publishes as Quinn Fawcett and William Fawcett
- Wilford Fawcett, aka "Captain Billy", "Billy Fawcett" (1885–1940), publisher and founder of Fawcett Publications

== Other uses ==
- William Fawcett (paddle steamer), two ships named after the engineer

== See also ==
- Fawcett (surname)
