= List of science fiction films before 1920 =

A list of science fiction films released before the 1920s. These films include core elements of science fiction and are widely available with reviews by reputable critics or film historians.

Title	Director	Cast	Country	Subgenre/Notes
1895
La Charcuterie mécanique	Lumière Brothers	No casts included	France	Short film
1897
Gugusse et l'Automate	Georges Méliès	Georges Méliès	France	Short film, lost
The X-Rays	George Albert Smith		United Kingdom	Short film
1898
Les rayons Röntgen	Georges Méliès		France	lost film
The Astronomer's Dream	Georges Méliès		France	
1902
A Trip to the Moon	Georges Méliès	Georges Méliès	France	Short film
1904
The Impossible Voyage; Le Voyage à travers l'impossible	Georges Méliès	Georges Méliès, Fernande Albany, Jehanne d'Alcy	France	Short film
1907
Under the Seas; AKA Deux Cents Milles sous les mers ou le Cauchemar du pêcheur AKA 20,000 Leagues Under the Sea	Georges Méliès	Georges Méliès	France	Short film
The Eclipse, or the Courtship of the Sun and the Moon	Georges Méliès	Georges Méliès	France	
1908
El hotel eléctrico	Segundo de Chomón	Segundo de Chomón	Spain	Short film
1909
Airship Destroyer	Walter R. Booth		United Kingdom	Short film
Viaje al planeta Júpiter	Segundo de Chomón	Segundo de Chomón	Spain	Short film
1910
Frankenstein	J. Searle Dawley	Augustus Phillips, Charles Stanton Ogle, Mary Fuller	United States	Short film
Viaje al centro de la tierra	Segundo de Chomón	Segundo de Chomón	Spain	Short film
1911
The Aerial Anarchists	Walter R. Booth		United Kingdom	Short film, lost film
Little Moritz enlève Rosalie	Henri Gambard		France	Short film
1912
Dr. Jekyll and Mr. Hyde	Lucius J. Henderson	James Cruze, Florence La Badie	United States	Short film
The Conquest of the Pole	George Melies	George Melies	France	Short film
1913
Amerika – Europa im Luftschiff	Alfred Lind		Germany	
Le avventure straordinarissime di Saturnino Farandola	Marcel Fabre		Italy	
A Message from Mars	J. Wallett Waller		United Kingdom	
1915
Der Kraftmeier	Ernst Lubitsch	Ernst Lubitsch	Germany	
Der Tunnel a.k.a The Tunnel	William Wauer	Friedrich Kayssler, Fritzi Massary, Hermann Vallentin, Felix Basch	Germany	
William Voss	Rudolf Meinert		Germany	
1916
20,000 Leagues Under the Sea	Stuart Paton	Leviticus Jones, Allen Holubar	United States	
Homunculus	Otto Rippert	Olaf Fønss, Friedrich Kuehne	Germany	Serial film
Tales of Hoffmann	Richard Oswald	Erich Kaiser-Titz, Werner Krauss	Germany	
Titanenkampf	Joseph Delmont	Erich Kaiser-Titz	Germany	
Verdens Undergang	August Blom	Alf Blütecher, Olaf Fønss, Johanne Fritz-Petersen	Denmark	
1917
Himmelskibet	Holger-Madsen	Ole Olsen	Denmark	
1918
Alraune	Michael Curtiz, Edmund Fritz	Géza Erdélyi, Gyula Gál	Hungary	
Alraune, die Henkerstochter, genannt die rote Hanne	Eugen Illés, Joseph Klein	Max Auzinger, Joseph Klein	Germany	
The Master Mystery	Burton King	Harry Houdini, Ruth Stonehouse, William Pike, Floyd Buckley	United States	Serial film
The Star Prince	Madeline Brandeis	Zoe Rae, Dorphia Brown	United States	
A Trip to Mars; AKA Himmelskibet	Holger-Madsen	Gunnar Tolnæs, Zanny Petersen, Nicolai Neiiendam	Denmark	
1919
Die Arche	Richard Oswald	Leo Connard, Eva Speyer	Germany	
The First Men in the Moon	Bruce Gordon, J.L.V. Leigh	Bruce Gordon, Heather Thatcher, Lionel d'Aragon	United Kingdom	lost film
The Mistress of the World	Joe May	Mia May, Michael Bohnen, Hans Mierendorff	Germany	

== See also ==
- History of science fiction films
