= Edward Fawcett (cricketer) =

English cricketer

Captain Edward Boyd Fawcett (11 October 1839 – 26 September 1884) was a British army officer and English cricketer active from 1859 to 1863. He was the father of explorer Percy Fawcett.

== Early life ==
Edward was born in India in Poona, British India to Henry Fawcett and Mary Sophia Fawcett. He was educated at Brighton College and Trinity College, Cambridge.

The Fawcetts were a family of old Yorkshire gentry (Fawcett of Scaleby Castle) who had prospered as shipping magnates during the late 18th and 19th century in the East Indies.

== Career ==
Fawcett played for the Sussex County Cricket Club. He appeared in 21 first-class matches as a righthanded batsman who bowled right-arm fast medium with a roundarm action. He scored 326 runs with a highest score of 53 and took 57 wickets with a best performance of six for 56.

Fawcett enjoyed a privileged upbringing. He became friends with the Prince of Wales, Albert Edward, the future Edward VII, and was appointed the prince's royal equerry.

== Personal life ==
In 1865, he married Myra Elizabeth MacDougall, only daughter of Colonel Andrew MacDougall, of Halebank, Torquay. He settled the family in Devon, where they had two sons, Edward Douglas in 1866 and Percy Harrison in 1867, followed by three daughters.

Fawcett earned a reputation for heavy drinking, gambling and philandering. He was born into money and married into it, and he squandered away both family fortunes. Already ill from alcoholism, he died of tuberculosis at age 44 in Teignmouth, Devon. His widow died in London on 14 October 1902.
