= Matipuhy language =

Language

Matipuhy
- Native to: Brazil
- Region: Xingú
- Ethnicity: 103 Matipu people (2006)
- Native speakers: 10 (2012)
- Language family: Cariban: Kuikuroan; Kuikúro–Matipuhy; Matipuhy

Language codes
- ISO 639-3: mzo
- Glottolog: mati1253
- Linguasphere: 80-AIB-bb
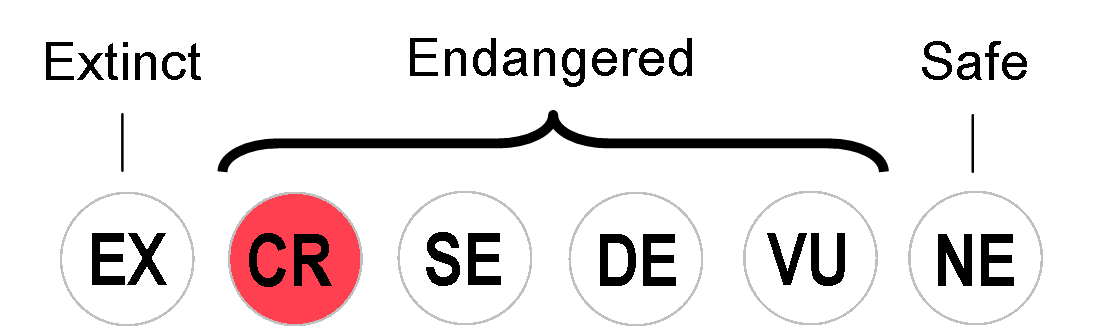
- Matipu is Critically Endangered according to the UNESCO Atlas of the World's Languages in Danger

Matipuhy is a moribund Cariban language of Brazil.
