= The Aerial Anarchists =

1911 British science fiction silent film by Walter R. Booth

- Screen shot
- Directed by: Walter R. Booth
- Produced by: Charles Urban
- Distributed by: Kineto Film
- Release date: 19 October 1911
- Running time: 15 minutes
- Country: United Kingdom
- Languages: Silent film English intertitles

The Aerial Anarchists is a 1911 British silent science fiction film directed by Walter R. Booth. It is the third and final film in Booth's science fiction series seeking to present a picture of futuristic aerial warfare. Aerial Anarchists followed on from Aerial Torpedo and Aerial Submarine and the films constitute the first real science fiction series made in the United Kingdom. The story focuses on an attack against London by a fleet of airships from an unknown country. (Note: Sources including www.silentsf.com posit that this film is based upon the Edward Douglas Fawcett novel, Hartmann the Anarchist.)

== Plot ==
There is currently no known surviving footage of this film and all information is based upon the original catalog synopsis from Kineto Film Studios. The film contains scenes of a bombing and its aftermath throughout London. Sequences such as the bombing of St. Paul's Cathedral and a railway disaster in which a train is seen to leap into a chasm, feature prominently.

== Production ==
Airships provide the "engine of destruction" in The Aerial Anarchists. The Kineto Film Catalogue describes the film as follows:

"This thrilling and amazing film depicts with far more realism than could be conveyed by the pen of the imaginative novelist, the horrors of warfare upon society if carried on by means of the latest development of mechanics - Aviation.

The picture is a series of thrills from beginning to end, but the most extraordinary and vivid incidents are the bombardment of St. Paul's Cathedral from an Aeroplane and a Railway Accident, in which a train leaps into a chasm.

These exciting scenes are so magnificent and realistically staged that they will fill audiences with amazement and mystification."

== Reception ==
Aviation film historian Michael Paris in From the Wright Brothers to Top Gun: Aviation, Nationalism, and Popular Cinema (1995) described the connection of The Aerial Anarchists to the novels of Jules Verne. "Clearly the paradox that while the flying machine could be a powerful agent of civilization and progress, in the wrong hands, it could also be a terrifying engine of destruction which would change the whole nature of warfare."

== See also ==
- Hartmann the Anarchist
- The Airship Destroyer
- The War in the Air
- Invasion literature
