= Kuikuro =

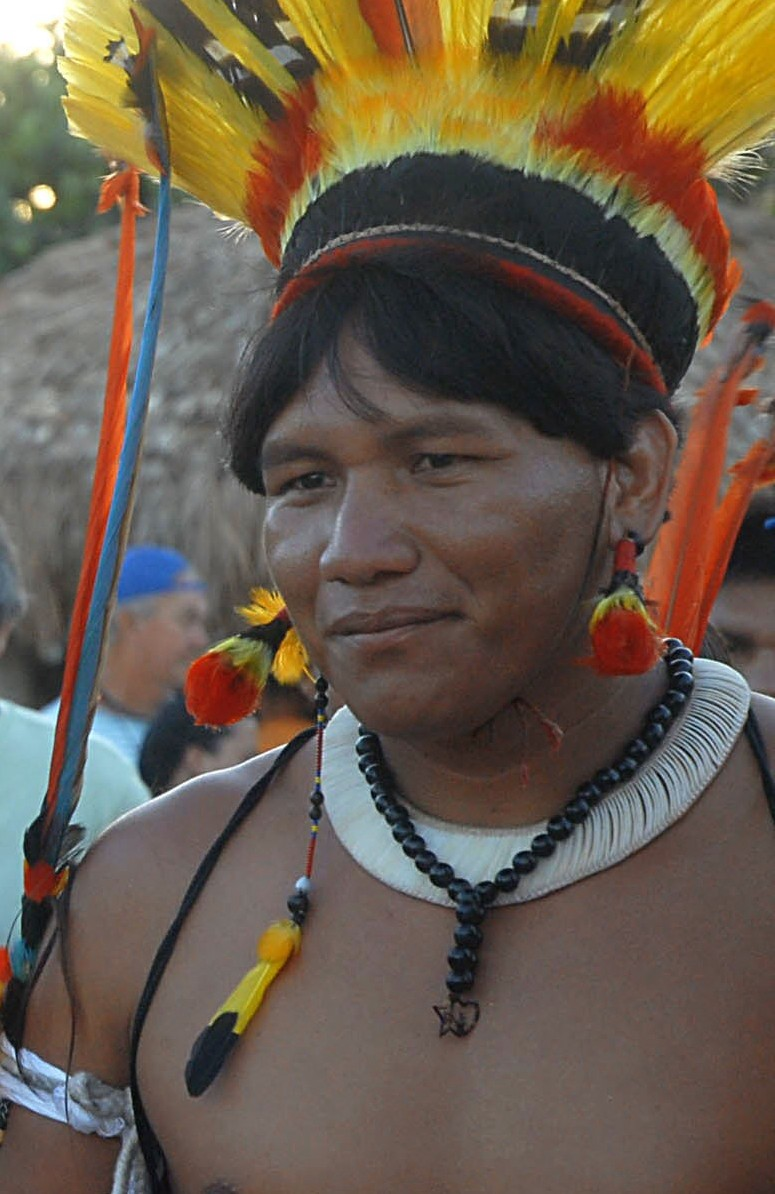
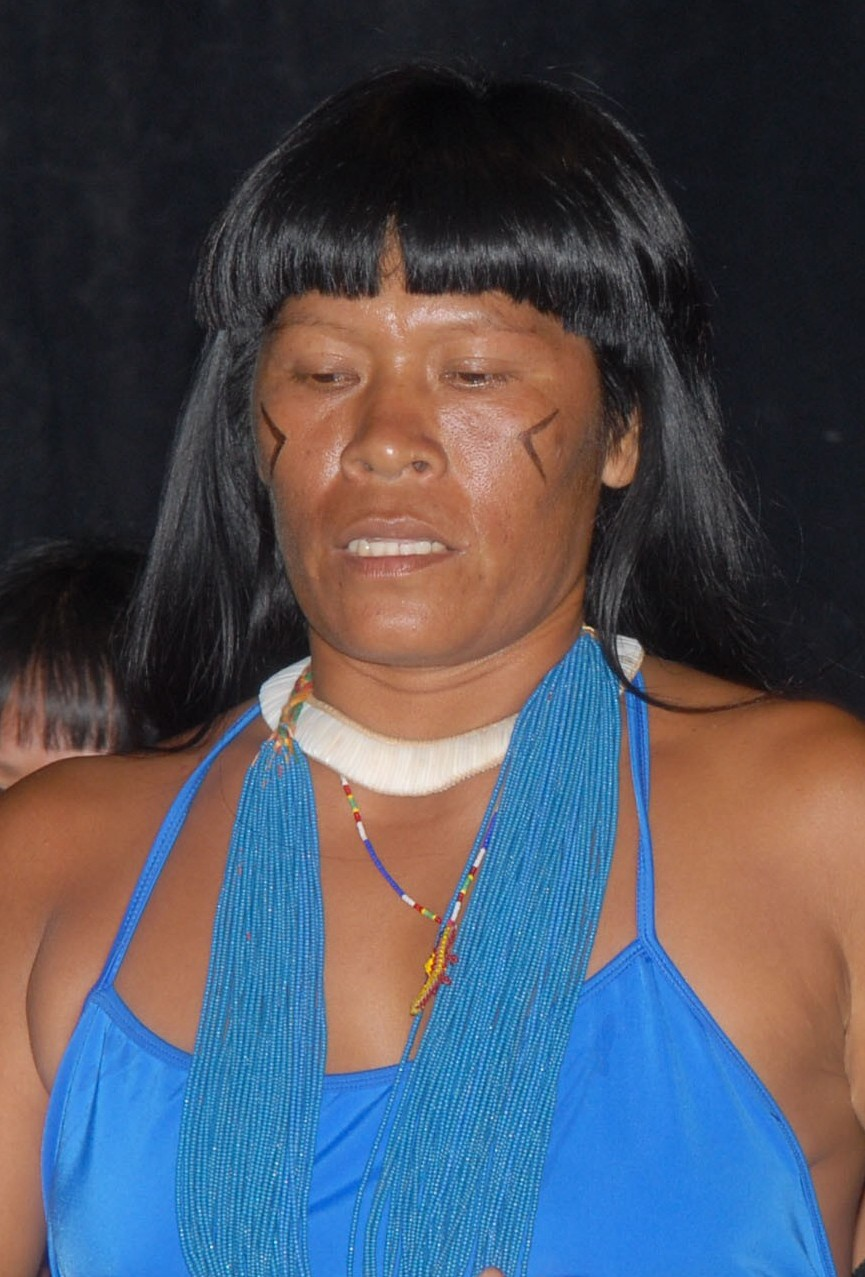
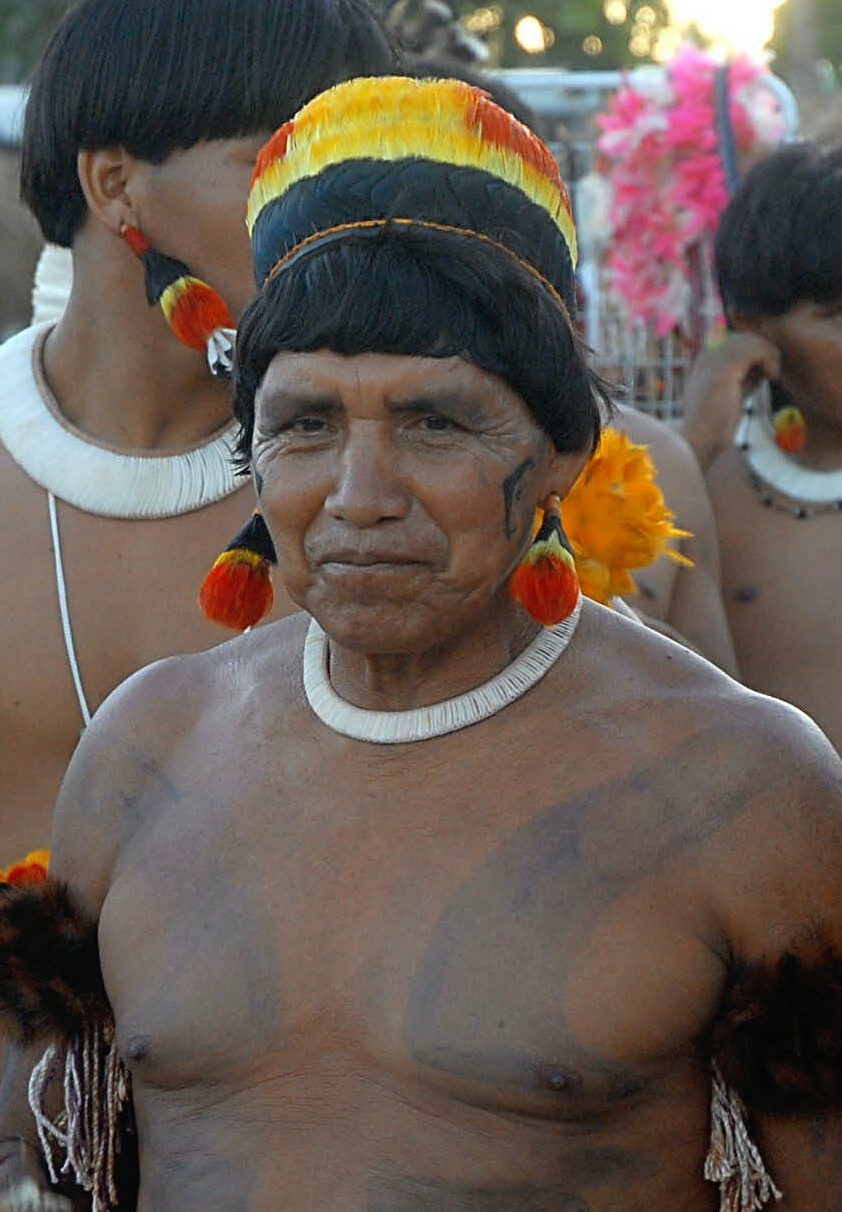
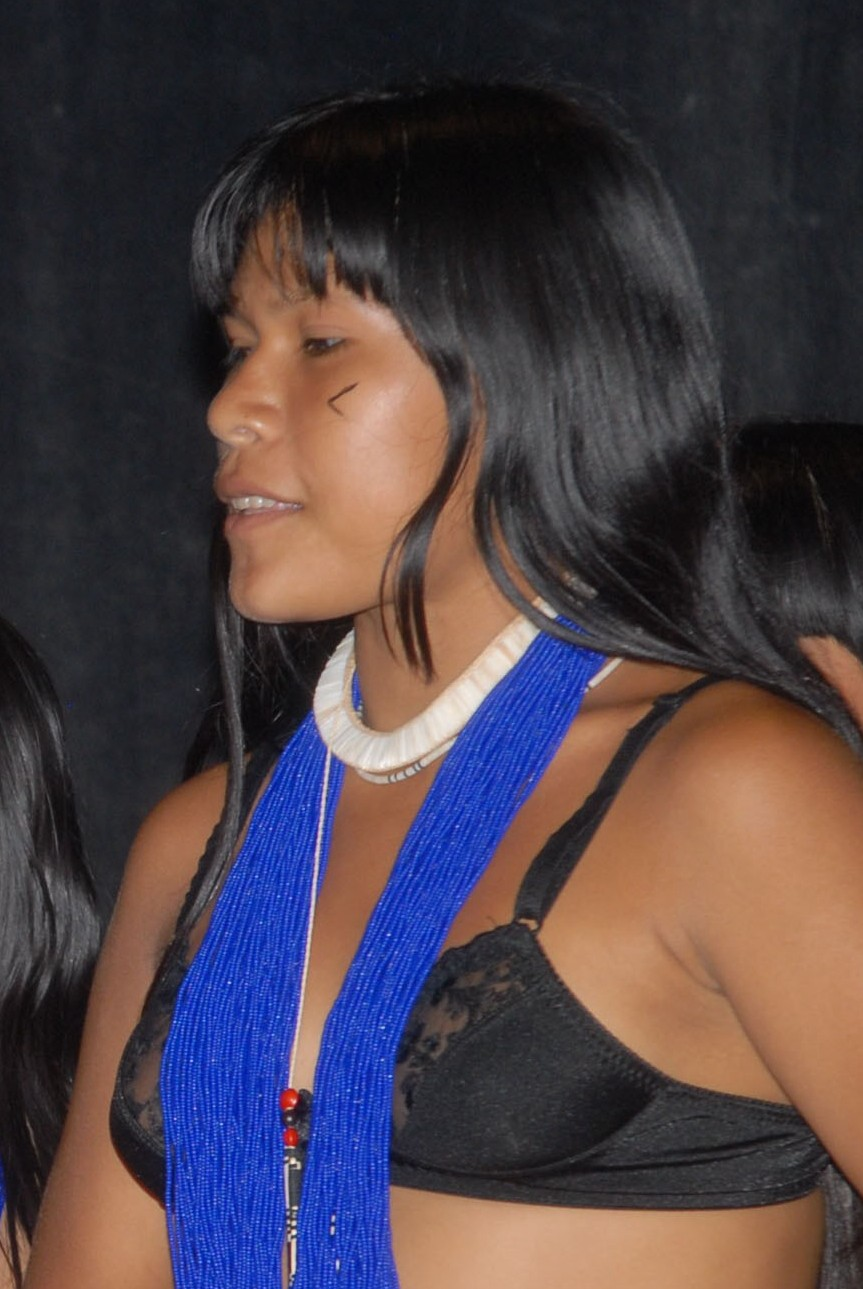
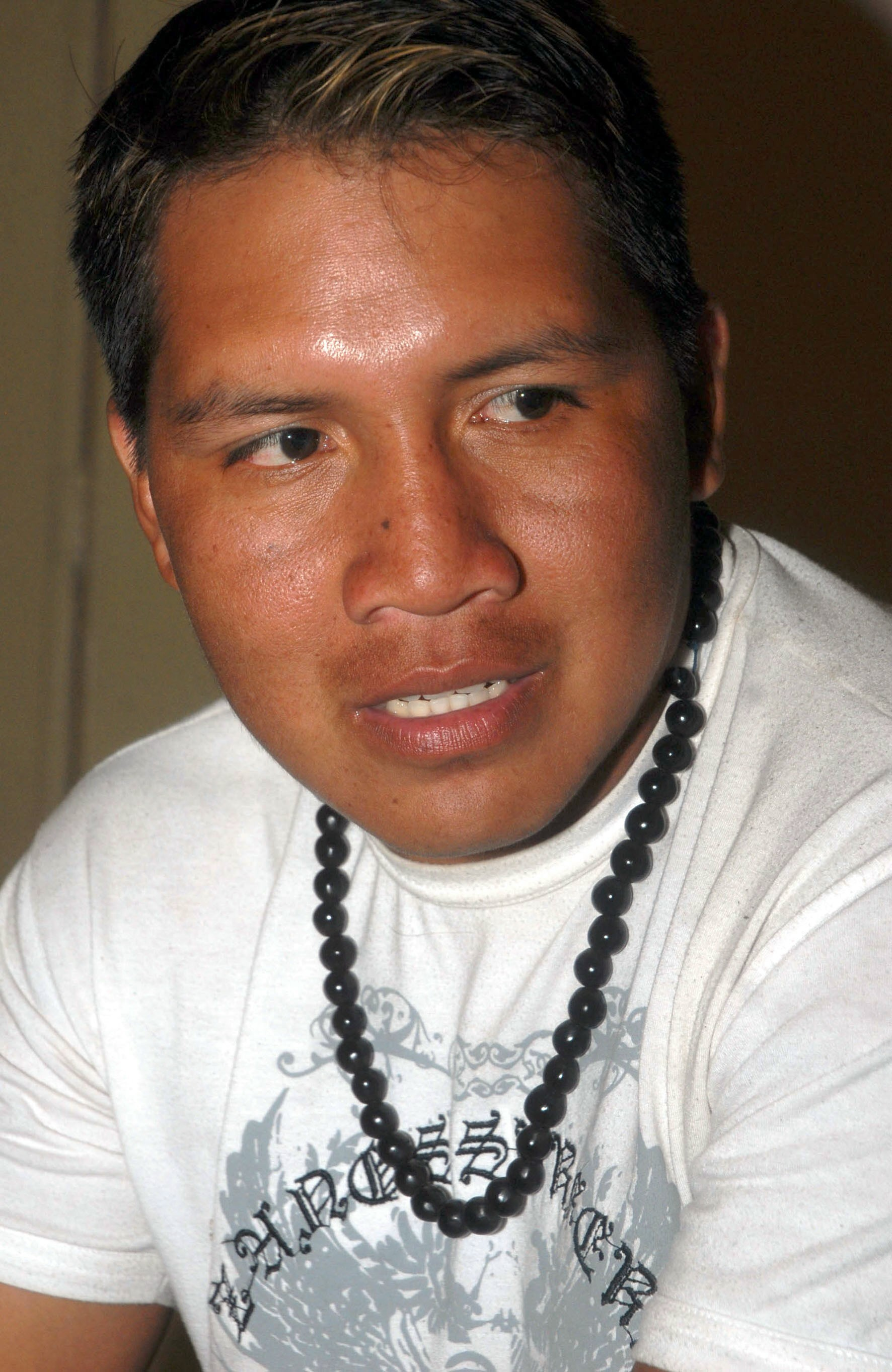
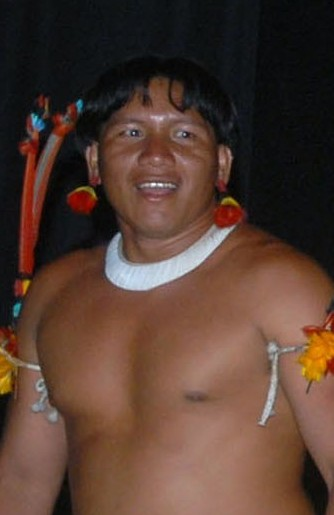

Total population
- 592 (in 2010)

Regions with significant populations
- Brazil

Languages
- Kuikuro (Karib), Portuguese

The Kuikuro are an Indigenous people from the Mato Grosso region of Brazil. Their language, Kuikuro, is a part of the Cariban language family. The Kuikuro have many similarities with other Xingu tribes. They have a population of 592 in 2010, up from 450 in 2002.

The Kuikuro are likely the descendants of the people who built the settlements known to archaeologists as Kuhikugu, located at the headwaters of the Xingu River. The settlements were probably inhabited from around 1,500 years ago to about 400 years ago; after this point the population may have been reduced by diseases introduced by Europeans or, indirectly, by other native tribes who had traded with Europeans. Stories of Kuhikugu may have inspired the British explorer Percy Fawcett on his ill-fated expedition looking for the "Lost City of Z" in the 1920s.

== Language ==
The Kuikuro language is a language of the Karib language family, one of four dialects from the southern Karib language, the other three being the Kalapalo, Nahukuá and Matipu languages. The Kuikuro language is still used in all aspects of life of the Kuikuros, except with communicating with other tribes. Intermarriage and Increased access to television and trading with the outside world has increased the need for the use of Portuguese. Tribal leaders and men most often know Portuguese, and it is rarer for women to know it, but this has been changing in recent years.

An orthography has been developed for Kuikuro and other Upper Xingu languages for training native teachers and creating educational materials. These teachers have now written a large number of texts, some used in local schools. Linguist Bruna Franchetto collected audio recordings of stories told in Kuikuro with transcriptions, which are permanently archived at the Archive of the Indigenous Languages of Latin America.

== History ==
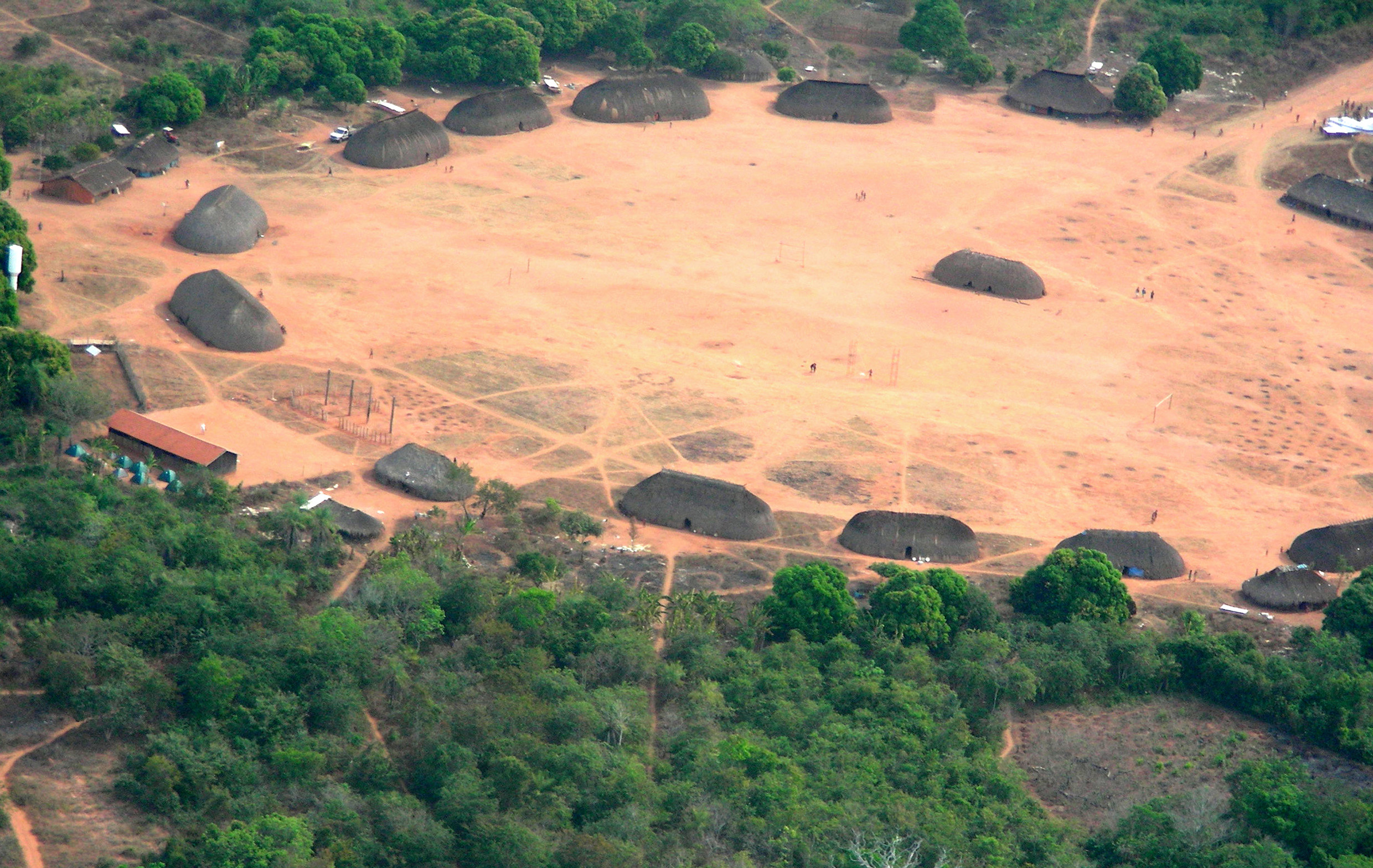
Principal Kuikuro village in the Xingu National Park

According to archaeological research, the history of the ancestors of the Kuikuros began around a thousand years ago. According to studies done in the Xingu region, by AD 1400 indigenous villages had reached great proportions, with buildings, palisades, bridges, and entry gates, with bridges and roads having congruent angles to each other. It is estimated that nearly 10,000 natives lived in the region at the time.

One of the first contact of the Kuikuros with Europeans was with the German Karl von den Steinen’s 1884 expedition. Steinen is known in Kuikuro narratives as Kalusi, "the first white man to come in peace." The Kuikuro’s oral history extends back to even before Steinen, to the first European man to visit the Xingu, though these people were not like Steinen, and captured and killed natives, and were known as bandeirantes. During contact with the Europeans, many deadly diseases were distributed to the natives and their numbers dropped dramatically. It is estimated that the population dropped from 3,000 natives in 1900 to little over 700 by the end of 1940.

== Religion ==
The Kuikuro’s religion is a mixture of Shamanist and healing beliefs. Their beliefs are based on traditional narratives that explain how and why things exist. They believe that Giti (Sun) and Alukuma (Moon) created the world, but they also believe in the ancestors of the sun and moon and how they were created. They also believe in Itseke, beings that live in the waters and in the forest that bring illness and death.

The Kuikuro follow shamans, who serve as religious leaders and healers. The shamans can also connect with the Itseke, while ordinary people can not. The shamans go through many rituals and initiations to become shamans, and must be in a state of seclusion during these initiations. They can then diagnose diseases and causes of natural disasters and theft in the village.
