= Edmund Alderson Sandford Fawcett =

English civil engineer, civil servant (1868–1938)

Edmund Alderson Sandford Fawcett CB, M.Inst.C.E., (27 April 1868 – 1 April 1938) was a British civil engineer and senior civil servant. He was secretary of the Ministry of National Service during World War I and chief engineer to the Ministry of Health from 1921 to 1930.

== Family and personal life ==
Edmund Alderson Sandford Fawcett was born at Childwick Hall, St Albans. A member of the Fawcett family, his father, Edmund Alderson Fawcett, originally from Sandford Hall, Warcop in Cumberland and later of Coleshill House, was a land owner and entrepreneur. His mother, Jane Harrison, was from Sandford House, Richmond, Yorkshire.

He married Gladys Heath, daughter of George Weller, of Amersham. They had three sons (Hugh, Eric and John) and one daughter (Loveday). He lived for a time in Chalfont St Giles and in 1918 bought The Rosary, a house in Coleshill.

In 1908, Fawcett won the Champion Cup (later the President's Cup) for croquet at the All England Club at Wimbledon, and also won croquet events at Hurlingham.

Fawcett died in Taunton on 1 April 1938. His funeral was held in Penn Street on 5 April 1938.

== Career ==
Fawcett practised as a civil engineer in Westminster until 1898, at which date - and at an unusually early age - he was appointed an engineering inspector at the Local Government Board, taking on some of the Board's most challenging inquiries. In 1911 he was appointed second deputy chief engineer to the Board and was no longer involved in public inquiries. In 1913 he became deputy chief engineer.

During World War I, Fawcett worked as a special investigator for the Ministry of Munitions, later working for the Manpower Distribution Board. He became secretary of the Ministry of National Service upon its formation. In the 1919 New Year Honours, he was created a CB in recognition of his services at the Ministry. In 1921 he was appointed chief engineer to the Ministry of Health, which - following the Ministry of Health Act 1919 - had absorbed the Local Government Board. He retired in 1930 and became a consulting engineer in Westminster, where he mainly worked on water supply schemes. His projects included the Amersham, Beaconsfield and District Waterworks.

Fawcett was a member of the Institution of Civil Engineers, an honorary member of the Institution of Water Engineers and of the Institution of Municipal and County Engineers, a Fellow of the Royal Sanitary Institute, and a past president of the Institution of Sanitary Engineers. He was elected a member of the Geological Society of London in January 1897.

=== Publications ===
- The purification of the water of swimming baths (1929), published by HMSO.
- "Rainfall and runoff", (1930) J. Inst. Munic. County Eng.
