= Hartmann the Anarchist =

1893 novel by E. Douglas Fawcett

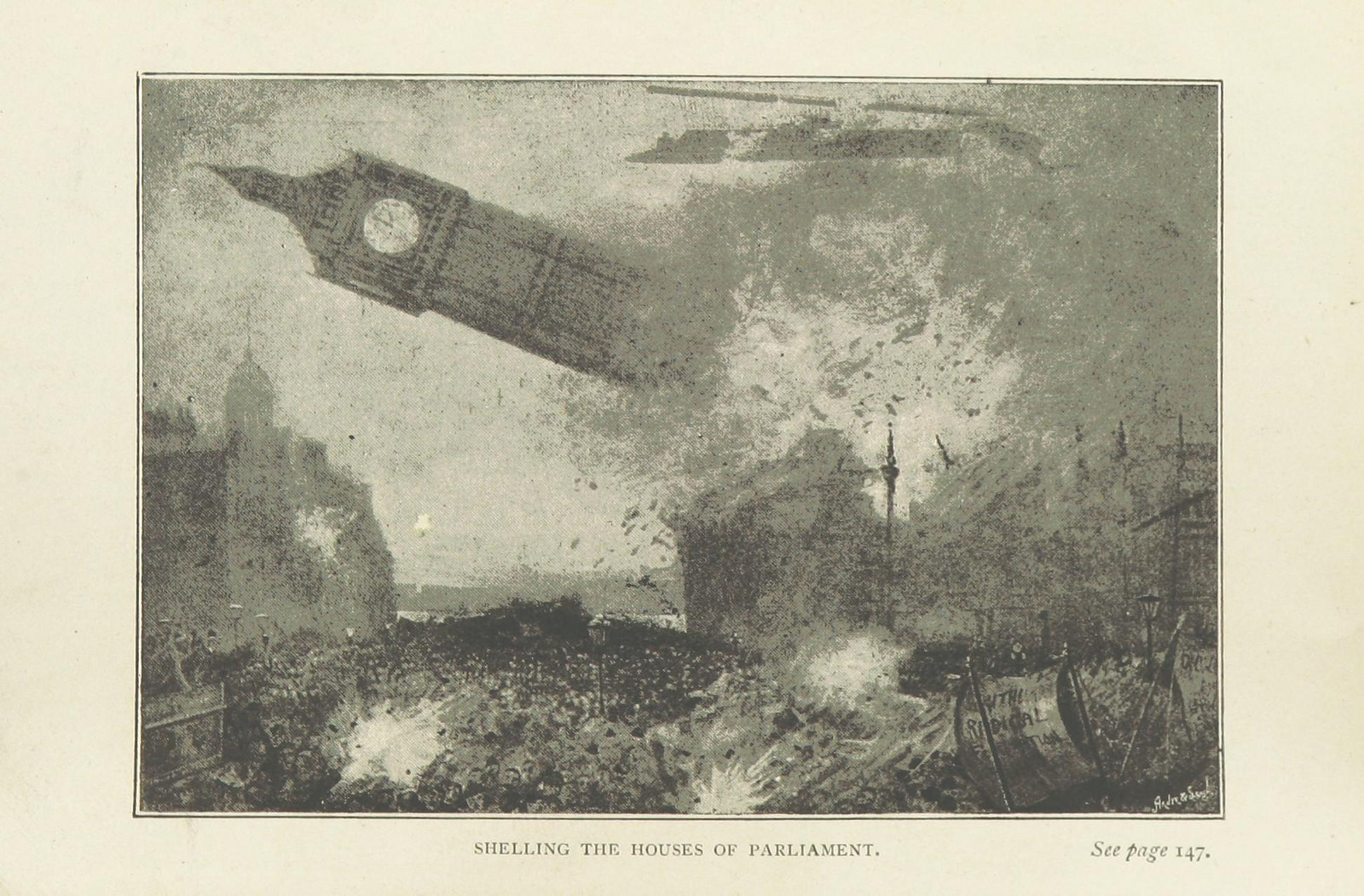
- Shelling the Houses of Parliament
- Author: Edward Douglas Fawcett
- Original title: Hartmann the Anarchist; or, The Doom of the Great City
- Language: English
- Genre: Science fiction
- Publisher: English Illustrated Magazine
- Publication date: 1893
- Publication place: UK
- Media type: book

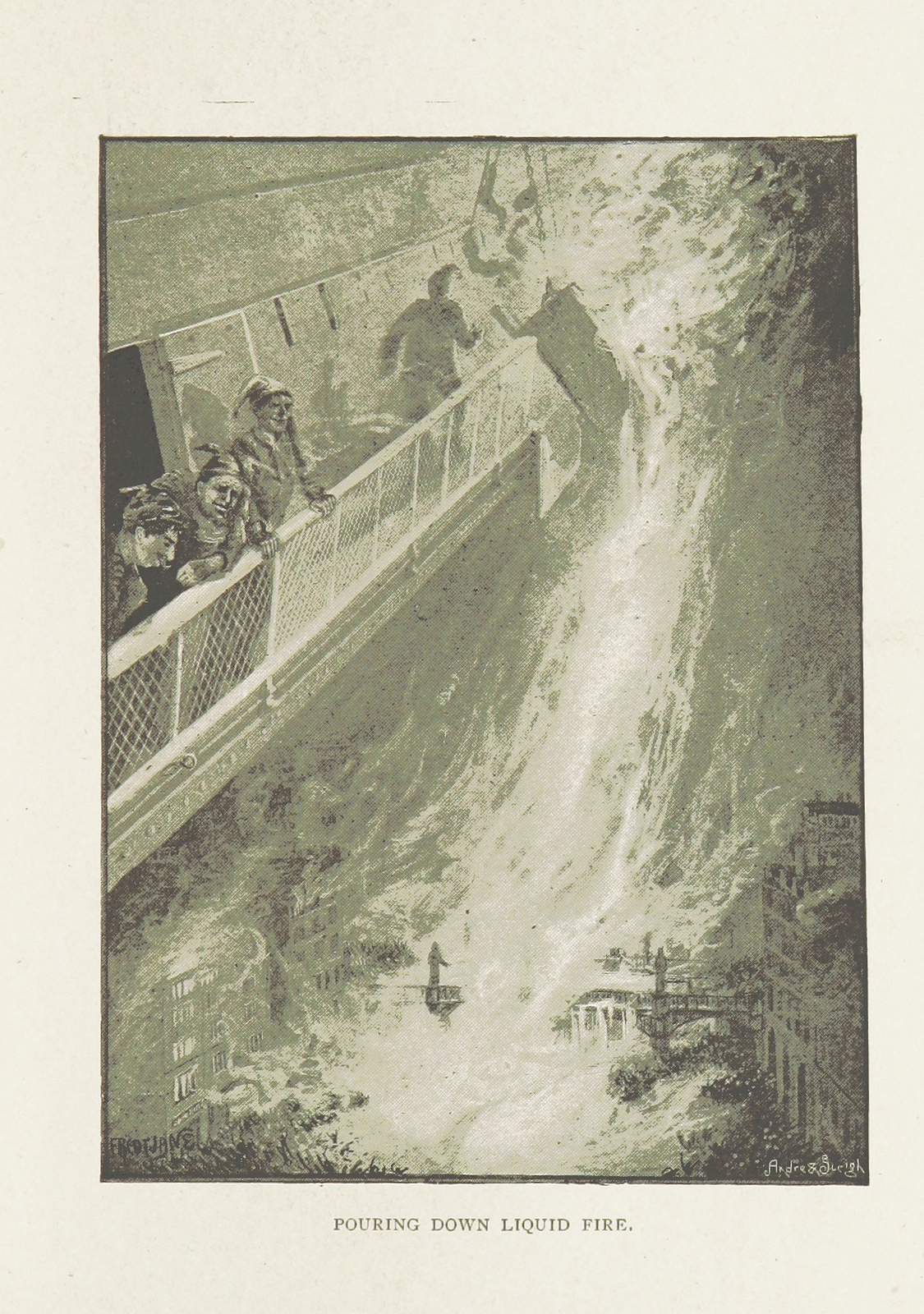
Pouring down liquid fire

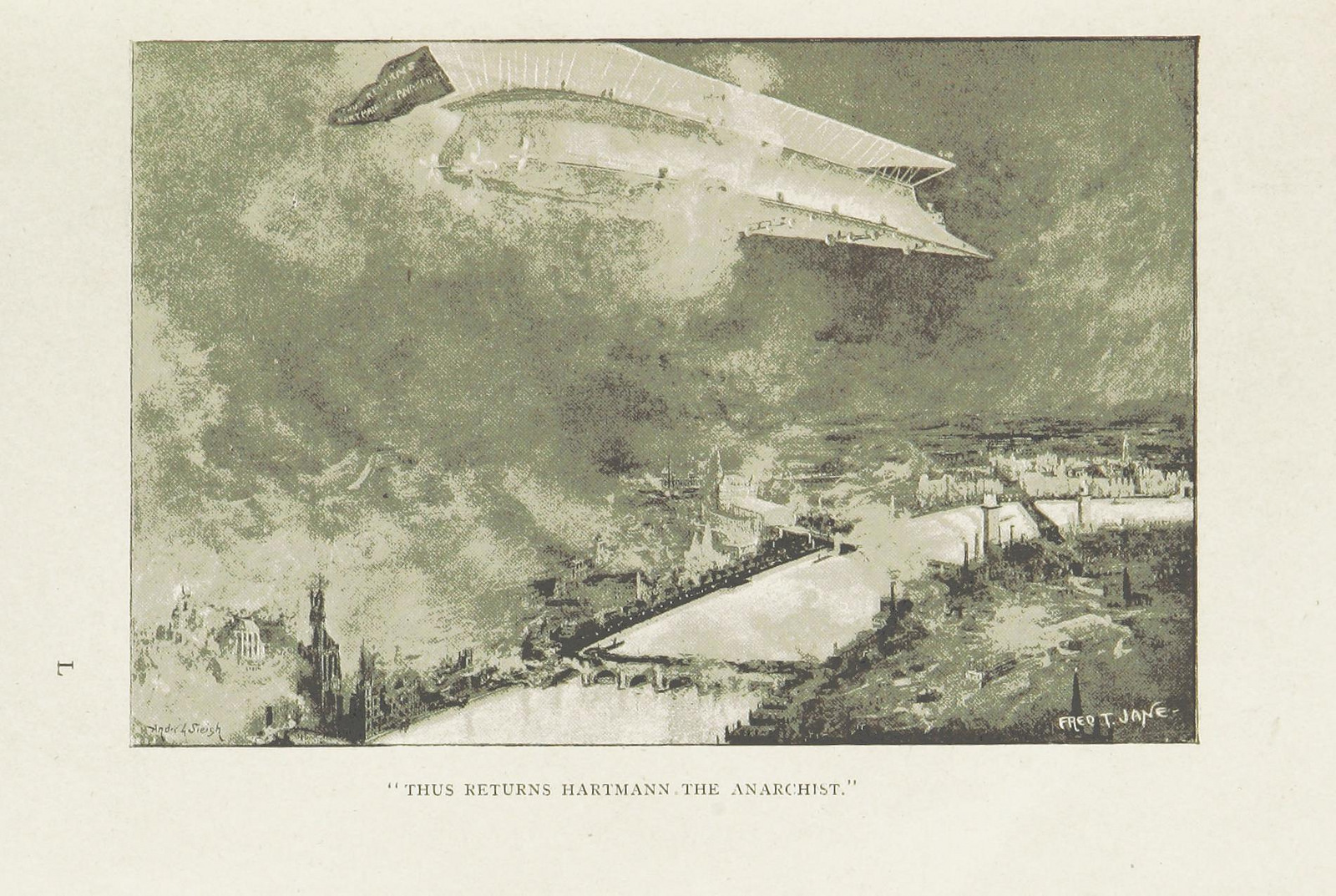
"Thus returns Hartmann the Anarchist."

Hartmann the Anarchist or The Doom of the Great City is a science fiction novel by Edward Douglas Fawcett first published in 1893. It remained out of print for over 100 years and has only recently been re-published.

The plot centers around Mr Stanley, a young moneyed gentleman who aims to stand for election as part of the Labour party in the early 20th century. Through his associations with many of London's most prominent socialists and anarchists, he encounters and befriends Rudolf Hartmann, an anarchist notorious for an attack on a bridge in London.

Hartmann was a talented engineer, and during exile in Switzerland had invented a new lightweight material from which his aircraft the Attila was constructed. It was a large heavier-than-air flying machine, consisting of a hull suspended below an aeroplane (or aerofoil.) The power source was electricity generated directly from coal, with motors driving external screws. Various saftely features were included such as redundancy and spare parts, with an emergency supply of compressed hydrogen which could be used to inflate a balloon. Hiram Maxim's design for a flying machine was suggested as an inspiration.

Hartmann uses his machine to attack London, intending to destroy civilisation to allow for it to be reconstructed on anarchist principles. Much of London is destroyed by fire and shells.

"But how is the new order to take shape? How educe system from chaos?"

"We want no more 'systems,' or 'constitutions' -- we shall have anarchy. Men will effect by voluntary association, and abjure the foulness of the modern wage-slavery and city-mechanisms."

"But can you expect the more brutal classes to thrive under this system. Will they not rather degenerate into savagery?"

"You forget the Attila will still sail the breeze, and she will then have her fleet of consorts."

"What! You do not propose, then, to leave anarchy unreasoned?"

"Not at once -- the transition would be far too severe. Some supervision must necessarily be exercised, but, as a rule, it will never be more than nominal."

== See also ==
- Die Anarchisten, an 1891 novel by John Henry Mackay also set in the fin de siècle London anarchist milieu
- The Aerial Anarchists
- Invasion literature
