= Fawcett family =

English gentry family

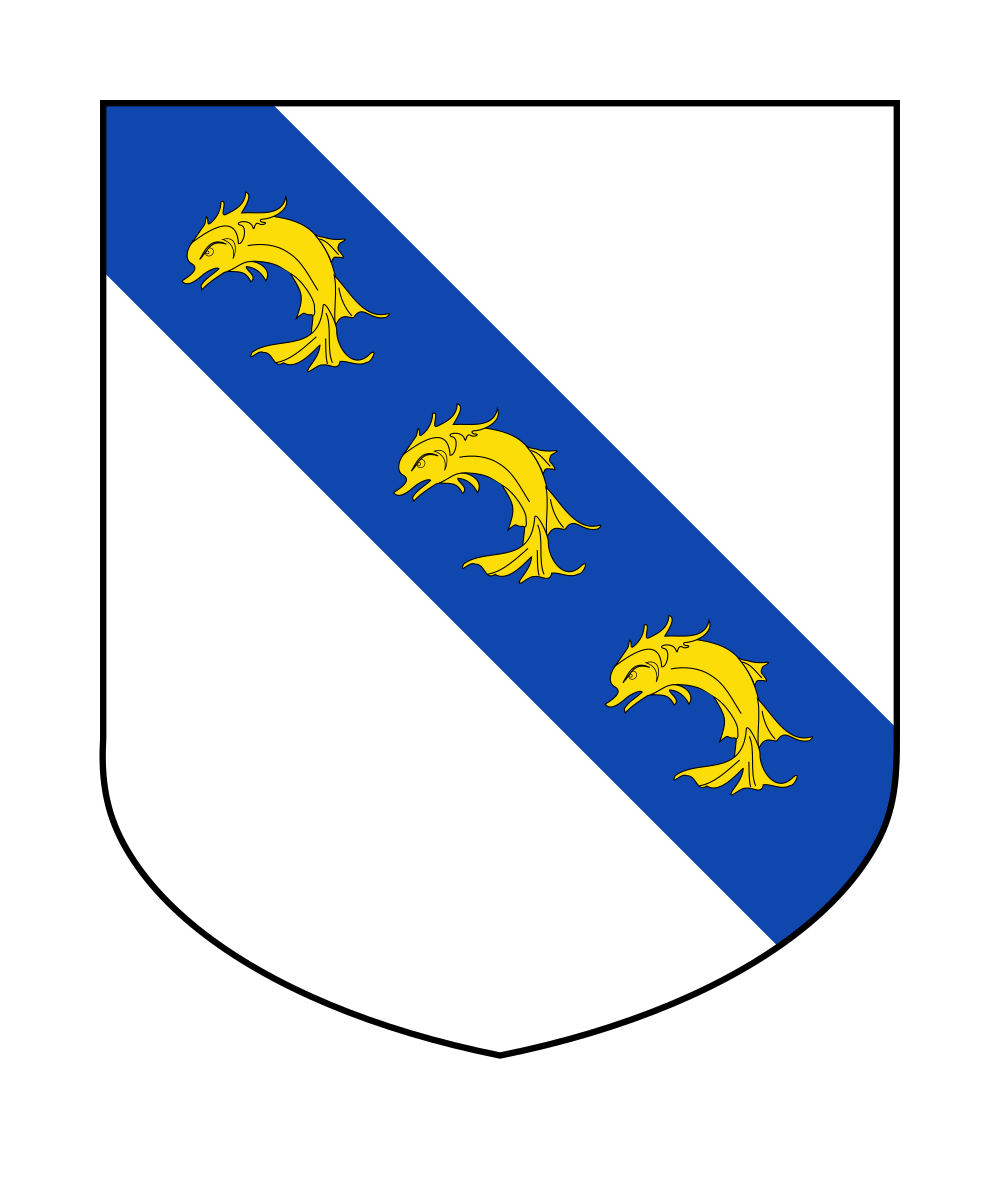
Arms of Fawcett of Sandford Hall: argent on a bend azure three dolphins embowed

Fawcett is the name of an old English gentry family which held lands in Cumbria, Northumberland, North Yorkshire and West Yorkshire. Prominent members of the family have included politicians, Privy Counsellors, senior army officers and civil servants, shipping magnates, explorers, and archaeologists.

== History ==
The Fawcett family shares its name with Fawcett street in Kensington, Fawcett Forest in Cumbria, Fawcett Moor in North Yorkshire, and a village in North Yorkshire listed as Forset in the Domesday Book of 1086.

Well documented sources of the family prior to the 14th century are scarce. According to the Oxford Dictionary of Family Names, the name Fawcett likely derives from earlier forms such as Forcett or Forset which it replaced over the course of the 15th century following the Hundred Years' War. The earliest recorded bearer of this name is Gilbert de Forcett, the younger son of Ervis, lord of Appleby-upon-Tees, who granted him the lands of Forcett upon his marriage; he appears under Henry II. Ervis was the grandson of a certain Ulf, listed as the lord of Appleby-Upon-Tees and Forcett in the Domesday Book. Following the First War of Scottish Independence in the 13th century, the family was granted the Manor of Hertesheved (modern Hartside) in the Breamish Valley, Northumberland with the task to oversee this area and defend the northeast border of the Kingdom of England.

From the 14th century onwards, the Fawcett family frequently appear in military records. They are recorded as having served with the Percy family in the Anglo-Scottish wars of the 14th century, and with the Clifford family, who held the offices of Warden of the Marches, in the battle of Flodden Field in 1513. The family's involvement in the Hundred Years' War is also recorded at the battle of Agincourt and the siege of Harfleur.

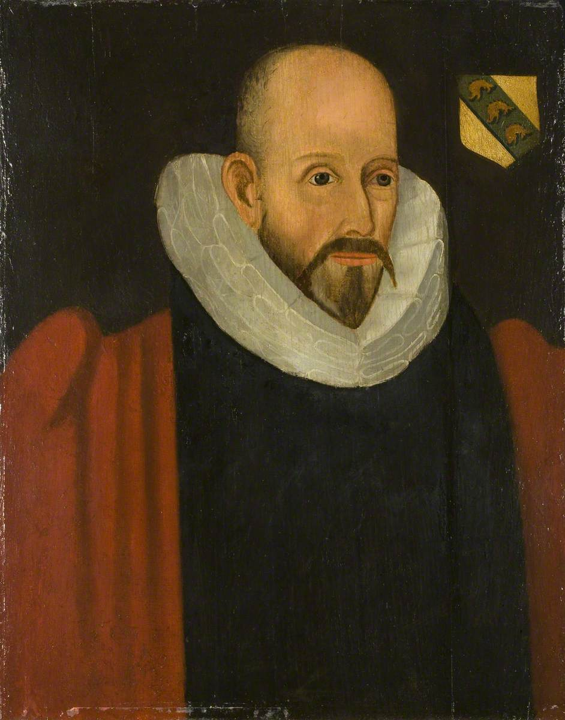
Henry Fawcett of Over Hesleden (1562 - 1619), Sheriff and Alderman of Norwich

During the Tudor and Stuart periods, the Fawcett family extended its land holdings southward mainly into the Yorkshire Dales and eastward into Cumbria. They formed strong ties with the Fountains Abbey, acting as both protectors and tenants of its lands. The family played a notable role in the Pilgrimage of Grace, protesting against the dissolution of the monasteries. The Fawcett family eventually became substantial landowners in the area when Miles Fawcett acquired 2,000 acres of former Fountains Abbey land from George Clifford, 3rd Earl of Cumberland, having assisted him financially during a period of bankruptcy. His brother, Henry Fawcett, a prosperous wool merchant became Alderman and Sheriff of Norwich.

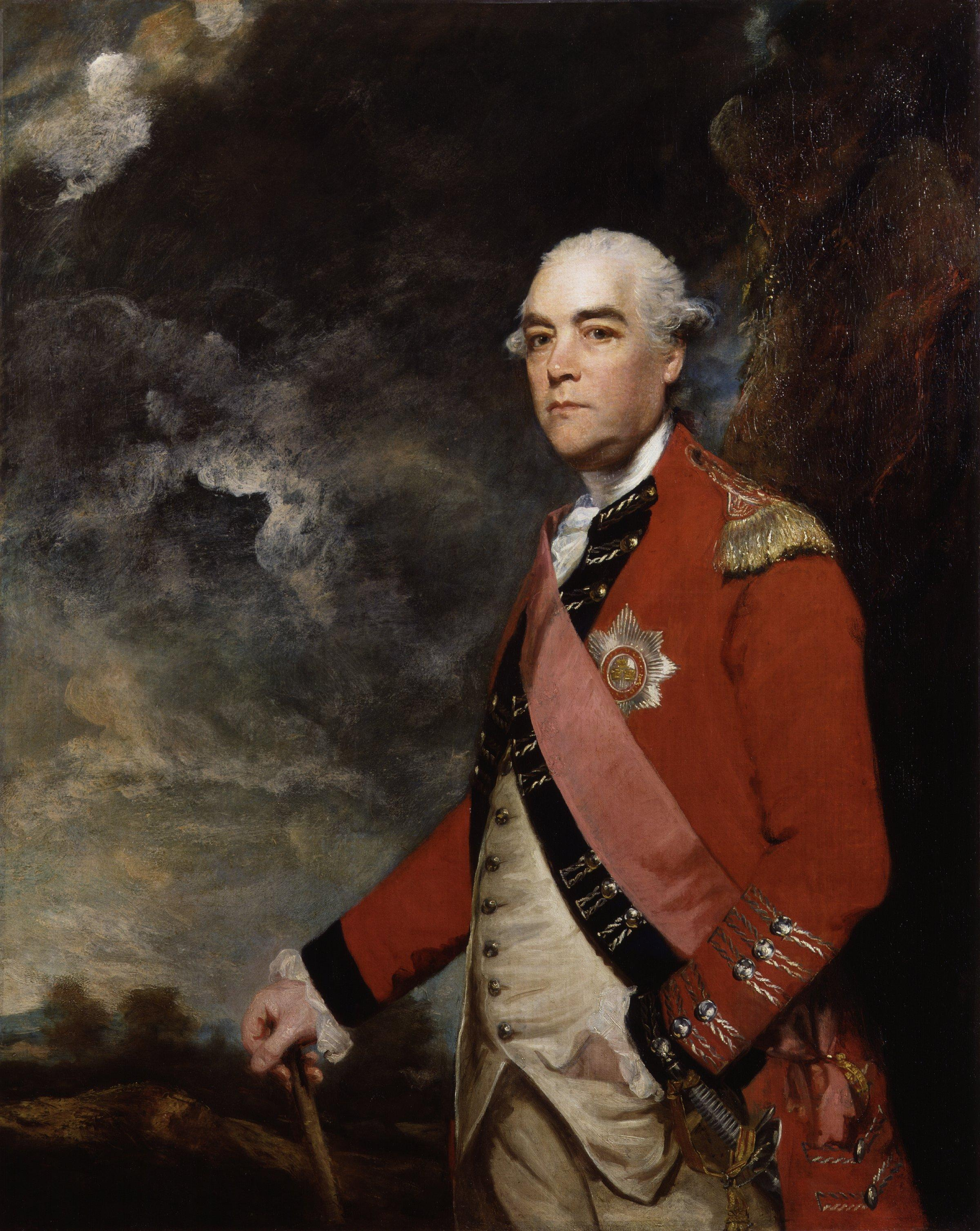
General Sir William Fawcett KB (1727 - 1804) by Joshua Reynolds

Over the course of the 17th and 18th centuries, the family acquired lands in Westmorland and in Cumbria, giving rise to three related branches.

The first, Fawcett of Sandford Hall, descends from Richard Fawcett, who acquired Sandford Hall in 1671. Among its distinguished descendants are Sir James Fawcett, President of the European Commission of Human Rights; Edmund Alderson Sandford Fawcett CB, the senior civil servant; and Dr. Hugh Alderson Fawcett, noted archaeologist.

The second branch, Fawcett of Scaleby Castle, was established in the late 18th century when Rowland Fawcett inherited Scaleby Castle in Cumbria. This line became prominent in maritime commerce through the founding of the shipping enterprise Fawcett & Co. of Bombay, noted for launching the merchant vessel Scaleby Castle.Notable figures from this branch include (Henry Fawcett MP of Scaleby Castle), Colonel James Malcolm Fawcett, the entomologist who gave his name to Fawcett’s clouded yellow, and the celebrated explorer Colonel Percy Harrison Fawcett.

The third branch, Fawcett of Shibden Hall, traces its origins to General Sir William Fawcett, who rose to prominence in the 18th century for his military acumen and far-reaching reforms within the British Army. His contributions were instrumental to British successes during the Napoleonic Wars. Sir William served as Adjutant-General from 1781 to 1799 and held the post of Commander-in-Chief in 1799. During this period, he was widely regarded as the most influential figure at Army headquarters and the de facto leader of the British military establishment.

The Fawcett family bears the arms “argent on a bend azure three dolphins embowed” with the crest a “dolphin embowed”. These arms were confirmed by the College of Arms in 1619. The three related branches of the Fawcett family bear these arms with different mottos:

- Fawcett (later Rehman Fawcett) of Sandford Hall: Nobilitas sola est atque unica virtus
- Fawcett of Shipden Hall: Officio et fide
- Fawcett of Scaleby Castle: Ne tentes aut perfice

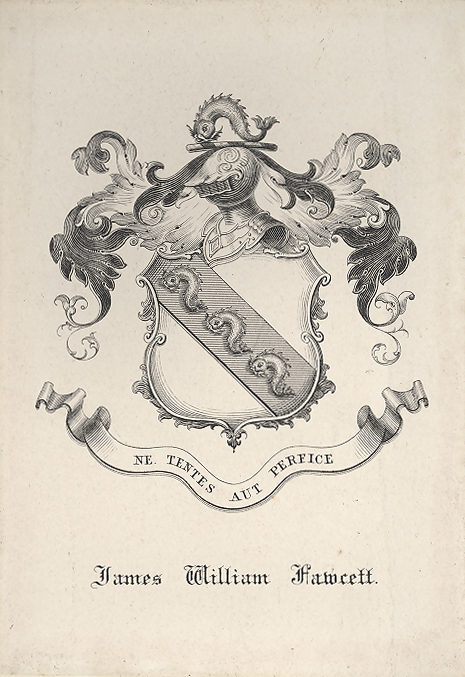
Ex Libris of James Fawcett of Scaleby Castle

The Fawcett family from North Yorkshire is a distinct family from the Fawcett family of Bradford who served as High Sheriffs of Durham (arms: Argent a lion rampant sable) and the Fawcett families of Somerset, Ireland and Scotland.

== Notable members of the family ==
- John Fawcett (14th century): Esquire who fought in Scotland with Sir Matthew Redmayne (1324-1390, recorded in 1381) with Sir William Hilton, Lord Hilton (1355-1435, recorded in 1384) for Henry Percy Earl of Northumberland (recorded from 1383 to 1385) and for John of Gaunt, Duke of Lancaster, Aquitaine (recorded in 1384).
- Robert Fawcett (15th century): Esquire who fought at the battle of Agincourt (1415) and in Harfleur with Sir William Willoughby (recorded in 1418) and Thomas Beaufort, Duke of Exeter.
- Richard Fawcett of Over Hesleden (16th century): In September 1513, took part in the battle of Flodden Field with Henry Clifford, 10th Baron Clifford. He formed part of the detachment who captured James IV of Scotland’s cannons and brought them back to Skipton Castle. In October 1536, he formed an army of several thousands of men with Jaques of Cray during the Pilgrimage of Grace and negotiated with the Duke of Norfolk.
- Edward Fawcett (16th century): Lord Mayor of York
- Henry Fawcett of Over Hesleden (1562-1619): prosperous wool merchant and benefactor of the city of Norwich. Sheriff & Alderman of Norwich, recorded by the College of Heralds confirming the Fawcett arms.
- The Right Honourable General Sir William Fawcett KB (1727-1804): British Army officer who served as Adjutant-General to the Forces from 1781 to 1799. Substantially reformed and professionalised the British Army, credited with the success armed forces met in the Napoleonic wars.
- Henry Fawcett MP of Scaleby Castle (1762-1816): shipping magnate who founded the firm Fawcett Co. of Bombay active in the East India trade. Launched the ship the Scaleby Castle.
- The Right Honourable Henry Fawcett MP (1833-1884): British academic, statesman and economist. Appointed Postmaster General by William Gladstone and sworn of the Privy Council.
- James Malcolm Fawcett (1856): entomologist who specialised in Lepidoptera. Fawcett's clouded yellow is named for him.
- Colonel John Fawcett (1803-1878): First Mayor of Brighton
- Dame Millicent Garrett Fawcett GBE (1847-1929): leader of the suffragette movement and writer (wife of Henry Fawcett MP).
- Philippa Garrett Fawcett (1868-1948): English mathematician and educationalist. First woman to obtain the top score in the Cambridge Mathematical Tripos exams (daughter of Henry and Millicent Fawcett).
- Edmund Alderson Fawcett of Sandford Hall (1816-1903): prosperous silk merchant and short horn cattle breeder, purchased Childwick Hall in Hertfordshire and later moved to Coleshill house in Amersham.
- Edmund Alderson Sandford Fawcett CB (1868-1938): Secretary of the Ministry of National Service during WWI. Supervised recruiting and manpower. Created Companion of the Bath in 1919 New Year honours. Close friend and advisor to Neville Chamberlain. Croquet Champion of the All England club at Wimbledon and Hurlingham.
- Dr Hugh Aderson Fawcett (1891-1982): archaeologist, prolific collector, and author. Reported the Mildenhall treasure to the British Museum. The discovery of the treasure and Hugh Fawcett's role is described by Roald Dahl in The Mildenhall treasure. The majority of his collection of over 7,000 ancient tools, weapons and artefacts are now in the Bristol Museum and Art Gallery.
- Sir James Edmund Sandford Fawcett DSC QC (1913-1991): president of the European Commission for Human Rights from 1972 to 1981.
- Major Peter Ernest Sandford Fawcett, Commander of the Order of the Palmes Académiques, Officer and Knight of the Legion of Honour, Officer and Knight of the Ordre National du Mérite (1922-2016): supported the installation of the Lycée Français Charles-de-Gaulle in South Kensington in the 1950s, President of the Alliance Française in London from 1983 to 1997, founding trustee of the Maison Française of Oxford, curator of the British Museum, Chairman of the Sassoon Ivory Trust, Chairman of the Oriental Ceramic Society.
- Edward Douglas Fawcett (1866-1960): English mountaineer, philosopher and novelist.
- Percy Harrison Fawcett (1867-1925): British geographer, artillery officer, cartographer, archaeologist, and celebrated explorer of South America.
- William Claude Fawcett (1902-1941): journalist, editor, broadcaster, and prolific author on fox hunting, horse racing, and equestrianism.

== See also ==
- Fawcett (musical family)
