= John Fawcett (surgeon) =

English surgeon (1866–1944)

John Fawcett FRCS FRCP (1866–1944) was an English surgeon who was dean of the Guy's Hospital medical school. He was born in Brixton and educated at Dulwich College. He graduated from the University of London.
