= Kuikúro language =

Cariban language spoken in Brazil

Kuikúro
- Apalakiri, Amonap
- Native to: Brazil
- Region: Xingu Indigenous Park, Mato Grosso
- Ethnicity: Kuikuro, Kalapalo
- Native speakers: 1,000 (2006)
- Language family: Cariban: Kuikuro–Pimenteira; Kuikuro–Matipuhy; Kuikúro
- Dialects: Kuikuro; Kalapalo

Language codes
- ISO 639-3: kui
- Glottolog: kuik1246
- ELP: Kuikuro
- Linguasphere: 80-AIB-b
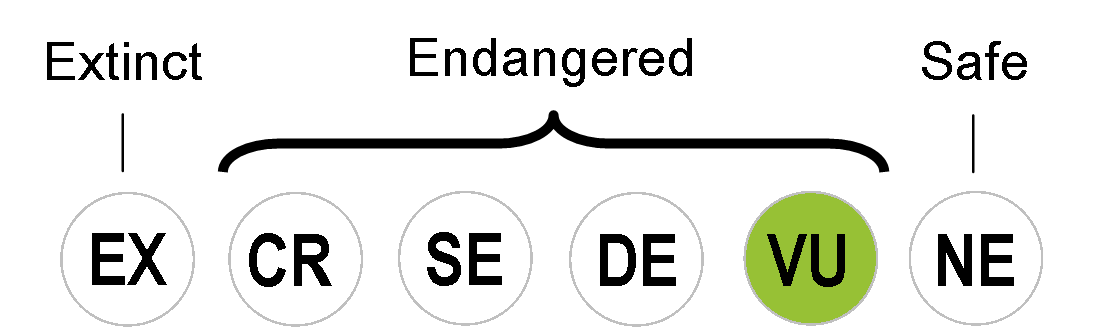
- Kuikuro and Kalapalo are Vulnerable according to the UNESCO Atlas of the World's Languages in Danger

Kuikúro, also known as Amonap, Upper Xingu Cariban and Apalakiri, is a Cariban language spoken by the Kuikuro and Kalapalo peoples of Brazil. It is spoken in seven villages along the Culuene River in the Xingu Indigenous Park of Mato Grosso. The Matipuhy language, closely related and sometimes considered a distinct language, is moribund, with only 10 speakers remaining.

Although bilingualism in Brazilian Portuguese is prevalent among the men of the community, Kuikúro is not as immediately endangered as are many Brazilian languages. As of 2006, there are an estimated 1,100 native speakers of the language, including 600 Kuikúro and 500 Kalapálo, who speak the same language but are ethnically distinct. The Endangered Languages Project lists the language as "threatened".

In collaboration with linguist Bruna Franchetto, the Kuikuro have created a library of recordings that feature Kuikuro stories in the language that is archived at the Archive of the Indigenous Languages of Latin America.

== Phonology ==
Vowels
	Front	Central	Back
Close	i ĩ	ɨ ɨ̃	u ũ
Mid	e ẽ		o õ
Open		a ã	

Consonants
	Labial	Alveolar	Palatal	Velar	Glottal
Nasal	m	n	ɲ	ŋ	
Stop	p	t	ɟ	k	
Affricate		ts			
Fricative		s		ɣ	h
Lateral		l			
Glide	w				

- /p/ can also be heard as [ɸ] in medial positions.
- Plosives /p, t, k/ when preceded by nasals are heard as prenasalized and voiced [ᵐb, ⁿd, ᵑɡ].

== Morphology ==
Like most of the Carib family, Kuikuro is an agglutinative language with a highly complex morphology that effects both verbs and nouns. It is head-final and dependent marking. Its case system is ergative. A sample sentence shows the S/O V structure, the morphological richness, and the ergativity of Kuikuro:

katsogo-ko heke kangamuke-ko kagine-nügü
dog-PL ERG child-PL frighten-PNCT
‘(the) dogs frightened (the) children’

=== Plurality ===
Kuikuro nouns can occur bare, with both number and definiteness being unmarked. Like many other neutral number languages (Korean, for example) there is a morpheme which - when affixed to a noun - denotes it as plural and marked. In Kuikuro this is the morpheme /-ko/. The following is demonstrative of one of the morpheme’s regular usages.

kanga → kanga-ko
{‘(the/a/some) fish/es’} {} {‘(the/some) fishes’}

*ehu-ko
{‘(the/some) canoes’}

Here the morpheme /-ko/ is only used on nouns that are [+animate] as in (2) but not (3).

In addition to the bound morpheme /-ko/, there is a quantifier which also serves to pluralize nouns; /tuguhu/. This quantifier is used to indicate that its entire constituent is pluralized. Unlike /-ko/ it can be used to mark plurality on nouns that are [-animate]. The following data is a minimal pair of readings that show the scope of /tuguhu/ and its usage as a pluralizer of [-animate] nouns.

*ehu tuhugu etenegü tuhugu
Canoe many.together {paddle canoe} many.together
‘(the) paddles of (the) canoes’

[ehu etene-gü] tuhugu
canoe paddle-REL many.together
‘(the) paddles of the canoe(s)

The preceding two morphemes are pluralizers of non-collective nouns. There is another set of morphemes which collectivize and pluralize nouns into sets that are – generally – based on the Kuikuro understanding of inter-personal relationships and kinship. Below is demonstrative of the collectivization concept, but not necessarily of the phono-morphological reality of its creation.

u-hi-sü u-hi-jão
1-younger.brother-REL 1-younger.brother-REL.COL
{‘my younger brother’} {‘all those whom I call ‘my younger brother’’}

These collective plurals and the collective plural morphemes are rich and complex and warrant further study.

=== Pronouns and Pronominals ===
Pronouns and pronominal expressions in Kuikuro are bound morphemes that can be prefixed onto nouns, verbs, and certain particles. A partial set is listed below, allomorphs are not included.

	Singular	Plural
First	u-	ku- (dual, inclusive)
Second	e-	e- -ko
Third	is-	is- -ko

These pronouns - when affixed to a VP - have an absolutive reading.

e-iniluN-ta(gü)-ko
2-cry-CONT(-REL)-PL
‘you (pl) are crying’

To affect an ergative reading of a pronoun, it is prefixed to the ergative particle /heke/. The data below also shows that /-ko/ - as a pronominal pluralizer – is placed at the end of the verb construction.

e-ini-ta(gü)-ko u-heke
2-see-CONT(-REL)-PL 1-ERG
‘I’m looking at you (pl)’

Apart from their use as arguments for VPs, pronouns are also used to denote possession on NPs. These possessive prefixes are generally the same as their pronominal counter-parts. The data below also shows how the possessive pronouns are also split if they are in the plural.

i-tahaku-gu-ko
3-bow-REL-PL
‘their bow(s)

Pronouns surface in Kuikuro as pronominal prefixes. They can act as arguments when attached to VPs or certain morphemes like /heke/, and they can act as possessives. They also display a number of phonologically conditioned allomorphs. Unlike its treatment of plurality, Kuikuro’s use of pronouns is largely unremarkable.

== Syntax ==
=== Case ===
Kuikuro from a typological prospective is ergative. There is no obvious absolutive case marker. The morpheme /heke/ is used with some variety of nominal or pronominal argument to denote the ergativity of the argument. Below is an example of a basic sentence.

u-ahetinhomba-tagü i-heke
1.ABS-help-CONT 3-ERG
‘he is helping me’

However, there is also data that suggests that there is an accusative element to the Kuikuro case system. This is shown in clefting situations, where /heke/ is not used and the language must find other strategies for showing case. In these scenarios, the verb takes on additional morphology to show for a non-agentive reading on the initial argument. Below is a pair of sentences that show the changes in their canonical form.

u-ingãtzu-ha ekise-I hikutaha enge-ni-mbüngü
1-sister-AF 3D-COP turtle eat-AGNR-SUBS
‘it was my sister who ate the turtle

hikutaha-ha ege-I u-ingãtzu ng-enge-tagü
turtle-AF DDIST-COP 1-sister OM-eat-CONT
‘it was a turtle that my sister was eating’

The ‘ng-‘ in the second example above is an object marker which blocks the reading of the sentence from being “it was a turtle that was eating my sister.” This is some evidence towards an accusative reading. But, there is no morphology on the argument itself and so it would be difficult to announce this as an accusative case rather than a different focus of the verb.

Other than the possible issues presented above, Kuikuro is a rather straightforward example of an ergative case system.

== Semantics ==
=== Constructions with numerals ===
Numerals function quite differently in Kuikuro than the typical Indo-European system. First, there are morphemes for 1-5 and 10 only. The rest of the numerals are phrasal.

1	aetsi
2	takeko
3	tilako
4	tatakegeni
5	nhatüi
10	timüho

The rest of the numbers from 6-9 and 11-20 are expressed through phrase-level constructions such as the following.

tilako inkguge-toho hügape
three cross-INSTR on.foot
‘Eighteen’

In NP-modifying constructions, numerals can occur either before the NP to be modified or at the end of the sentence.

konige tilako tahitse ingi-lü u-heke
yesterday three macaw see-PNCT 1-ERG
‘Yesterday I saw three macaws’

konige tahitse ingi-lü u-heke tilako
yesterday macaw see-PNCT 1-ERG three
‘Yesterday I saw three macaws’

Neither of the above examples can be read as having been counting the VP. To achieve this, the numeral must occur immediately preceding the VP it is quantifying.

ige ngune-mbeke tilako u-hülu ihisundu
DPROX moon-TEMP three 1-walk unit
‘I traveled three times this month’

Critically, the above cannot be read as ‘three months’ but has to be a verb-numeral construction.

The counting of mass nouns hinges on the fact that Kuikuro is a number neutral language. In this system nouns can occur as either plural or singular and can occur bare. The Kuikuro grammar allows mass nouns to be counted using an assumed container. The following is a typical form.

tilako nhukau
three pequi.oil
‘three bottles of pequi oil’

tilako u-ngipi nhukau ingü
three 1-have pequi.oil container
‘I have three bottles of pequi oil’

Note that the morpheme /ingü/ is non-obligatory and that the container is assumed. This structure follows for all kinds of mass nouns.
