= Bill Fawcett (sportsman) =

Australian rules footballer

Personal information
- Full name: Albert William Baird Fawcett
- Born: 15 May 1890; Albert Park, Victoria
- Died: 4 March 1970 (aged 79); Canterbury, Victoria
- Original team: Footscray (VJFA)
- Height: 182 cm (6 ft 0 in)
- Weight: 83 kg (183 lb)
- Position: Defender

Playing career^{1}
Years	Club	Games (Goals)
1920	Melbourne	1 (0)
1921	Essendon	2 (0)
Total		3 (0)
- ^{1} Playing statistics correct to the end of 1921.

Albert William Baird Fawcett (15 May 1890 – 4 March 1970) was a sportsman and sports administrator, known in the sports of rowing, swimming, Australian rules football in Melbourne's western suburbs.

Fawcett was born at the facilities of the Albert Park Rowing Club, where his father – a Maribyrnong River boat builder – was caretaker, and he was involved in rowing and swimming from a young age, winning hundreds of junior trophies. In 1912, he became secretary of the Footscray Rowing Club, and dominated maiden and junior events through the year.

Fawcett joined the army in World War I, and fought in France as a lieutenant of the 4th Machine Gun Battalion. He was also the sports organiser for his battalion. He was mugged behind his own line by a gang of deserters while preparing for leave, which saw him spend three weeks in hospital with a fractured skull and concussion.

After his return to Australia, he continued as one of the state's best rowers, described by his pairs partner Alf Jonsson as the most vigorous stroke in Melbourne. Fawcett and Jonsson won the Victorian state champion pairs in 1921.

Although lesser known for it, Fawcett played football in the winters, and at his peak played one senior match with Melbourne and two with Essendon in the Victorian Football League (VFL); and also with Yarraville and the Footscray Juniors in the Victorian Junior Football Association. He was also an interstate boxer.

Fawcett held many administrative positions across his chosen sports throughout his life, and was highly regarded for his effort and passion for the roles. Roles included: founder of the Footscray Swimming Club in 1908; vice-president of the Footscray Rowing Club; a long stint as secretary of the Victorian Amateur Swimming Association from 1924 until 1941; president of the Footscray Football Club from 1939 until 1941; and president of the Footscray Football Club Old Players' Association from its foundation in 1948 until his death in 1970. He also arranged 4th Machine Gun Battalion reunions throughout his life.

Fawcett worked for the Post Master General's Department throughout his life, beginning as a messenger boy and retiring as chief cashier. He married Dorothy Pont and had one daughter, Valerie. Fawcett died aged 79 in 1970.
