= Percy Fawcett =

British explorer and military officer

Lieutenant-Colonel Percy Harrison Fawcett DSO
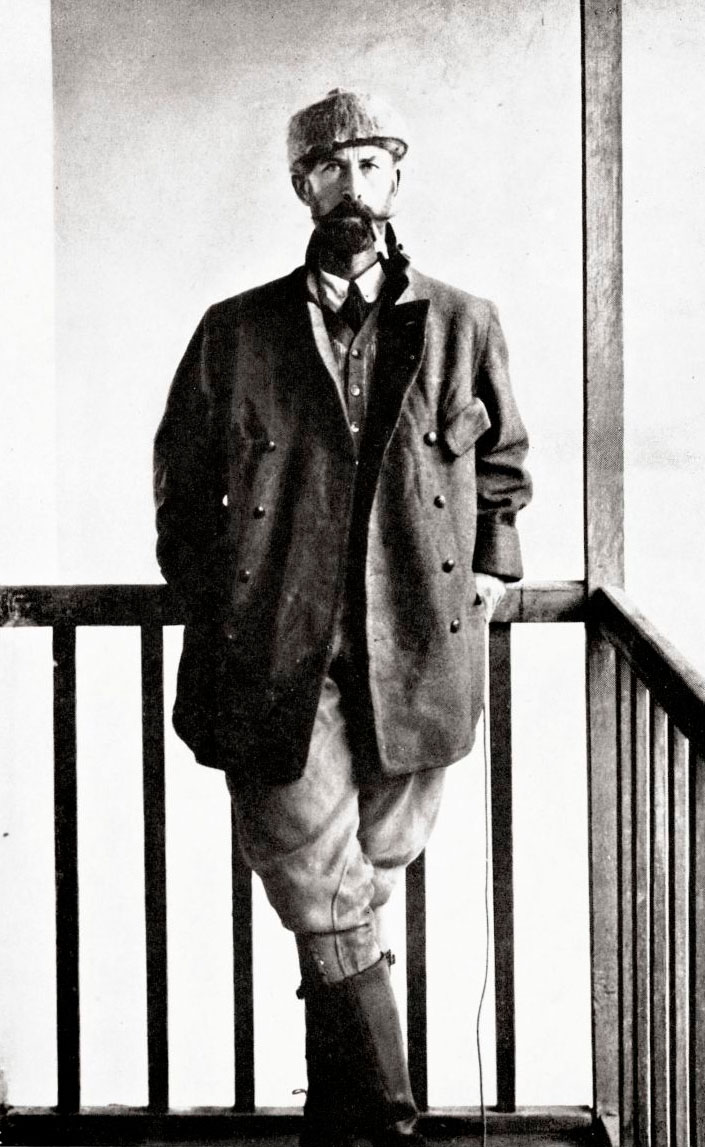
- Fawcett in 1911
- Born: Percy Harrison Fawcett; 18 August 1867; Torquay, England
- Disappeared: 29 May 1925 (aged 57); Mato Grosso, Brazil
- Education: Royal Military Academy
- Occupations: Artillery officer, archaeologist, geologist, explorer
- Spouse: Nina Agnes Paterson (m. 1901)
- Children: 3
- Father: Edward Boyd Fawcett
- Relatives: Edward Douglas Fawcett (brother)
- Military career
- Allegiance: United Kingdom
- Branch: British Army
- Service years: 1886–1910 c.1914–1919
- Rank: Lieutenant-Colonel
- Unit: Royal Artillery
- Conflicts: World War I
- Awards: Distinguished Service Order

Percy Harrison Fawcett DSO (18 August 1867 – disappeared 29 May 1925) was a British geographer, artillery officer, cartographer/surveyor, archaeologist and explorer of South America. He disappeared in 1925 (along with his eldest son, Jack, and one of Jack's friends, Raleigh Rimmel) during an expedition to find an ancient lost city which he and others believed existed in the Amazon rainforest.

== Life ==
=== Early life ===
Fawcett was born on 18 August 1867 at Devonia Villa in Torquay, Devon to Edward Boyd Fawcett, a cricketer, and Myra Elizabeth Fawcett (née MacDougall). The Fawcett were a family of old Yorkshire gentry (Fawcett of Scaleby Castle) who had prospered as shipping magnates in the East Indies during the late 18th and 19th centuries. The second of five siblings, Fawcett was the younger brother of the mountaineer, philosopher and writer Edward Douglas Fawcett.

Educated at Newton Abbot Proprietary College in Newton Abbot, Devon, where he was a classmate of Bertram Fletcher Robinson. Fawcett then attended Westminster School from June 1881 to April 1882. Later enrolling at the Royal Military Academy, Fawcett was commissioned as a lieutenant in the Royal Artillery on 24 July 1886. Fawcett was posted to Trincomalee, Ceylon (present-day Sri Lanka), where he meet his future wife Nina Agnes Paterson (1870–1954).

Returning to Britain by the early 1890s, Fawcett was posted to Falmouth and took a course in gunnery instruction in Shoeburyness. On 26 January 1901, Fawcett and Nina were married at St Matthias Church in Richmond. The couple had two sons, Jack (1903–1925?) and Brian (1906–1984), and one daughter, Joan (1910–2005). On 13 January 1896, Fawcett was appointed Adjutant of the 1st Cornwall (Duke of Cornwall's) Artillery Volunteers, and was promoted to captain on 15 June 1897. He later served in Hong Kong, Malta and Trincomalee.

Fawcett joined the RGS in 1901 with the aim of studying surveying and mapmaking. Later, he worked for the British Secret Service in North Africa while pursuing the surveyor's craft. He served for the War Office on Spike Island in County Cork from 1903 to 1906, where he was promoted to major on 11 January 1905. Fawcett became friends with authors Sir Arthur Conan Doyle and Sir Henry Rider Haggard; the former used Fawcett's Amazonian field reports as inspiration for his novel The Lost World.

=== Early expeditions ===
Fawcett's first expedition to South America was launched in 1906 after the RGS sent him to Brazil to map an area of the jungle bordering Bolivia. The RGS had been commissioned to map the area as a third party unbiased by local national interests. Fawcett arrived in La Paz in June. While on the expedition, in 1907, he claimed to have seen and shot a 62-foot (19 m) long giant anaconda, a claim for which he was ridiculed by scientists. He reported other mysterious animals unknown to zoology, such as a small cat-like dog about the size of a foxhound, which he claimed to have seen twice, and the giant Apazauca spider, which was said to have poisoned a number of locals. The giant peanuts which he found in the Mato Grosso region were almost certainly Arachis nambyquarae which has legumes up to 9 cm (4 in) in length.

Fawcett made seven expeditions between 1906 and 1924. He was mostly amicable with the local indigenous peoples through gifts, patience and courteous behaviour. In 1908 he traced the source of the Rio Verde (Brazil) and in 1910 made a journey to Heath River (on the border between Bolivia and Peru) to find its source, having retired from the British Army on 19 January. In 1911, Fawcett once again returned to the Amazon and charted hundreds of miles of unexplored jungle, accompanied by his trusted, longtime exploring companion, Henry Costin, and biologist and polar explorer James Murray. After a 1913 expedition, Fawcett supposedly claimed to have seen dogs with double noses. These may have been double-nosed Andean tiger hounds.

By 1914, based on documentary research, Fawcett had formulated ideas about a "lost city" he named "Z" (Zed) somewhere in the Mato Grosso. He theorized that a complex civilization once existed in the region and that isolated ruins might have survived. Fawcett also found a document known as Manuscript 512, written after explorations made in the sertão of the state of Bahia, and housed at the National Library in Rio de Janeiro. It is believed to have been authored by Portuguese bandeirante João da Silva Guimarães, who wrote that in 1753 he had discovered the ruins of an ancient city that contained arches, a statue and a temple with hieroglyphics; the city is described in great detail without providing a specific location. This city became a secondary destination for Fawcett, after "Z".

In Brazil, Fawcett carried a jade statue of a human figure with inscriptions on the chest and feet that he claimed had supernatural powers over the indigenous tribes of the Amazon. He told Ramiro Noronha, a Brazilian general, "by showing the statue, he could exercise an irresistible power over the natives."

At the beginning of the First World War, Fawcett returned to Britain to serve with the British Army as a reserve officer in the Royal Artillery, volunteering for duty in Flanders and commanding an artillery brigade despite being nearly fifty years old. As a counter-battery colonel, he only allowed shots against targets that were clearly visible, or "those that he had personally detected on his ouija board." He was promoted from major to lieutenant-colonel on 1 March 1918, and received three mentions in despatches from Field Marshal Sir Douglas Haig, in November 1916, November 1917, and November 1918. He was also awarded the Distinguished Service Order in June 1917.

After the war, Fawcett returned to Brazil to study local wildlife and archaeology. In 1920, he made another attempt along with Ernest G. Holt and Lewis Brown but gave up when his colleagues were unable to withstand the hardships. He then went alone to search for "Z" but ended it after suffering from a fever and shooting his pack animal.

=== Final expedition ===
In 1924, Fawcett returned to Brazil with his eldest son Jack and Jack's longtime friend, Raleigh Rimmel, for an exploratory expedition to find "Z". Fawcett left instructions stating that if the expedition did not return, no rescue expedition should be sent lest the rescuers suffer his fate.

Fawcett was a man with years of experience travelling and had taken equipment such as canned foods, powdered milk, guns, flares, a sextant and a chronometer. His travel companions were both chosen for their health, ability and loyalty to each other; Fawcett chose only two companions in order to travel lighter and with less notice to indigenous tribes, as some were hostile towards outsiders.

On 20 April 1925, Fawcett's final expedition departed from Cuiabá. In addition to Jack and Rimmel, he was accompanied by two Brazilian labourers, two horses, eight mules and a pair of dogs. The last communication from the expedition was on 29 May when Fawcett wrote, in a letter to his wife delivered by a native runner, that he was ready to go into unexplored territory with only Jack and Rimmel. They were reported to be crossing the Upper Xingu, a southeastern tributary river of the Amazon River. The final letter, written from Dead Horse Camp, gave their location and was generally optimistic.

== Posthumous events and speculations ==
The RGS declared and accepted the men as lost in January 1927, almost two years after the party's last message. Soon after this declaration, a large number of volunteers offered to attempt to locate the lost explorers. Many expeditions attempting to find Fawcett failed. At least one lone searcher died in the attempt.

Many people assumed that local indigenous peoples killed Fawcett's party, as several tribes were nearby at the time: the Kalapalos, the last tribe to have seen them; the Arumás; the Suyás; and the Xavantes, whose territory they were entering. According to explorer John Hemming, Fawcett's party of three was too few to survive in the jungle and his expectation that his indigenous hosts would look after them was likely to have antagonized them by failing to bring any gifts to repay their generosity.

Twenty years later, a Kalapalo chief called Comatzi told his people how unwelcome strangers were killed, but others have thought they became lost and died of starvation, and the bones provided by Comatzi turned out not to be those of Fawcett. Edmar Morel and Nilo Vellozo reported that Comatzi's predecessor, Izarari, had told them he had killed Fawcett and his son Jack, seemingly by shooting them with arrows after Fawcett allegedly attacked him and other Indians when they refused to give him guides and porters to take him to their Chavante enemies. Rolf Blomberg reported that Izarari had told him that Rimmel had already died of fever in a Kurikuro camp. A somewhat different version came from Orlando Villas-Bôas, who reported that Izarari had told him that he had killed all three men with his club the morning after Jack had allegedly consorted with one of his wives, when he claimed that Fawcett had slapped him in the face after the chief refused his demand for canoes and porters to continue his journey.

The Kalapalo have an oral story of the arrival of three explorers which states that the three went east, and after five days the Kalapalo noticed that the group no longer made campfires. The Kalapalo say that a very violent tribe most likely killed them. However, both of the younger men were lame and ill when last seen, and there is no proof that they were murdered. It is plausible that they died of natural causes in the Brazilian jungle.

In 1927, a nameplate of Fawcett's was found with an indigenous tribe. In June 1933, a theodolite compass belonging to Fawcett was found near the Baciary Indians of Mato Grosso by Colonel Aniceto Botelho. However, the nameplate was from Fawcett's expedition five years earlier and had most likely been given as a gift to the chief of that tribe. The compass was proven to have been left behind before he entered the jungle on his final journey.

=== Dead Horse Camp ===
Dead Horse Camp, or Fawcett's Camp, was his last known location. From Dead Horse Camp, he wrote to his wife about the hardships that he and his companions had faced, his coordinates, his doubts in Rimmel, and Fawcett's plans for the near future. He concludes his message with, "You need have no fear of any failure..."

One question remaining about Dead Horse Camp concerns a discrepancy in the coordinates Fawcett gave for its location. In the letter to his wife, he wrote: "Here we are at Dead Horse Camp, latitude 11 degrees 43' South and longitude 54 degrees 35' West, the spot where my horse died in 1920" (11°43′S 54°35′W). However, in a report to the North American Newspaper Alliance he gave the coordinates as 13°43′S 54°35′W (note S 13° versus S 11°). The discrepancy may have been a typographical error. However, he may have intentionally concealed the location to prevent others from using his notes to find "Z". It may have also been an attempt to dissuade any rescue attempts; Fawcett had stated that if he disappeared, no rescue party should be sent because the danger was too great.

=== Henry Costin's opinion ===
Explorer Henry Costin, who accompanied Fawcett on five of his previous expeditions, expressed his doubt that Fawcett would have perished at the hands of native indigenous people, as he typically enjoyed good relations with them. He believed that Fawcett had succumbed to either a lack of food or exhaustion.

=== Rumours and unverified reports ===
During the ensuing decades, various groups mounted several rescue expeditions, without success. They heard only various rumours that could not be verified.

While a fictitious tale estimated that 100 would-be-rescuers died on several expeditions attempting to discover Fawcett's fate, the actual toll was only one—a man who ventured after him alone. One of the earliest expeditions was commanded by British-American explorer George Miller Dyott. In 1927, he claimed to have found evidence of Fawcett's death at the hands of the Aloique, but his story was unconvincing. From 1930 to 1931, Aloha Wanderwell used her seaplane to try to land on the Paraguay River to find him. After an emergency landing and living with the Bororo tribe for six weeks, with no luck in her search for Fawcett, Aloha and her husband Walter flew back to Brazil.

=== Fawcett's alleged bones ===
In 1951, Orlando Villas-Bôas, activist for indigenous peoples, received what were claimed to be some of the bones of Fawcett and had them analysed scientifically. The analysis supposedly confirmed the bones were Fawcett's, but his son Brian (1906–1984) refused to accept this. Villas-Bôas claimed that Brian was too interested in making money from books about his father's disappearance. Later scientific analysis confirmed that the bones were not Fawcett's. In December 1964, the remains that had been attributed to Fawcett were returned by the Museu Nacional to Orlando Villas-Bôas.

In 1998, English explorer Benedict Allen went to talk to the Kalapalo people, said by Villas-Bôas to have confessed to having killed Fawcett and his party. An elder of the Kalapalo, Vajuvi, claimed during a filmed BBC interview with Allen that the bones found by Villas-Bôas were not really Fawcett's. Vajuvi also denied that his tribe had any part in the disappearance of the expedition. No conclusive evidence supports the latter statement.

=== Villas-Bôas story ===
Danish explorer Arne Falk-Rønne journeyed to Mato Grosso during the 1960s. In a 1991 book, he wrote that he learned of Fawcett's fate from Villas-Bôas, who had heard it from one of Fawcett's murderers. Allegedly, Fawcett and his companions had a mishap on the river and lost most of the gifts they had brought along for the Indian tribes. Continuing without gifts was a serious breach of protocol; since the expedition members were all more or less seriously ill at the time, the Kalapalo they encountered decided to kill them. The bodies of Jack and Rimmel were thrown into the river; Fawcett, considered an old man and therefore distinguished, received a proper burial. Falk-Rønne visited the Kalapalo and reported that one of the tribesmen confirmed Villas-Bôas's story about how and why Fawcett had been killed.

=== Fawcett's signet ring ===
In 1979, Fawcett's signet ring was found in a pawnshop. A new theory is that Fawcett and his companions were killed by bandits and the bodies were disposed of in a river while their belongings were despoiled.

=== Russian documentary ===
In 2003, a Russian documentary film, The Curse of the Incas' Gold / Expedition of Percy Fawcett to the Amazon (Russian: Проклятье золота инков / Экспедиция Перси Фоссета в Амазонку), was released as a part of the television series Mysteries of the Century (Тайны века). Among other things, the film emphasizes the recent expedition of Oleg Aliyev to the presumed approximate place of Fawcett's last whereabouts and Aliyev's findings, impressions, and presumptions about Fawcett's fate. The film concludes that Fawcett may have been looking for the ruins of El Dorado, a city built by more advanced people from the other side of the Andes, and that the expedition members were killed by an unknown primitive tribe that had no contact with modern civilization.

=== Commune in the jungle ===
On 21 March 2004, The Observer reported that television director Misha Williams, who had studied Fawcett's private papers, believed that he had not intended to return to Britain but rather meant to found a commune in the jungle, based on theosophical principles and the worship of his son Jack. Williams explained his research in some detail in the preface to his play AmaZonia, first performed in April 2004.

== In popular culture ==
In 2005, The New Yorker staff writer David Grann visited the Kalapalo and reported that it had apparently preserved an oral history about Fawcett, among the first Europeans the tribe had ever seen. The oral account said that Fawcett and his party had stayed at their village and then left, heading eastward. The Kalapalos warned Fawcett and his companions that if they went that way they would be killed by the "fierce Indians" who occupied that territory, but Fawcett insisted upon going. The Kalapalos observed smoke from the expedition's campfire each evening for five days before it disappeared. The Kalapalos said they were sure the fierce natives had killed them. The article also reports that a monumental civilisation known as Kuhikugu may have actually existed near where Fawcett was searching, as discovered recently by archaeologist Michael Heckenberger and others. Grann's findings are further detailed in his book The Lost City of Z (2009), which was adapted into the 2016 filmThe Lost City of Z, written and directed by James Gray and starring Charlie Hunnam as Fawcett.

The popular horror fiction podcast, The Magnus Archives, focuses on Fawcett in episode 133, "Dead Horse" (4 April 2019) written by Jonathan Sims. The podcast's fictional narrator, The Head Archivist (played by Sims), reads a letter by Fawcett in which he recounts parts of his expedition and sheds light on its darker aspects. It also explores the relationship between Fawcett's son and their companion Raleigh Rimmel.

== Works ==
- Fawcett, Percy and Brian Fawcett (1953), Exploration Fawcett, Phoenix Press (2001 reprint), ISBN 1-84212-468-4
- Fawcett, Percy and Brian Fawcett (1953), Lost Trails, Lost Cities, Funk & Wagnalls ASIN B0007DNCV4
- Fawcett, Brian (1958), Ruins in the Sky, Hutchinson of London

== See also ==
- List of people who disappeared mysteriously: 1910-1990
- Category:Lost explorers

== Bibliography ==
- Falk-Rønne, Arne. (1991). Klodens Forunderlige Mysterier. Roth Forlag.
- Fleming, Peter. (1933) Brazilian Adventure, Charles Scribner's Sons ISBN 0-87477-246-X
- Grann, David (2009) The Lost City of Z: A Tale of Deadly Obsession in the Amazon ISBN 978-0-385-51353-1
- Leal, Hermes (1996), Enigma do Coronel Fawcett, o verdadeiro Indiana Jones (Colonel Fawcett: The Real-Life Indiana Jones; Published in Portuguese)
- La Gazette des Français du Paraguay, Percy Fawcett – Un monument de l'Exploration et de l'Aventure en Amérique Latine – Expédition du Rio Verde – bilingue français espagnol – numéro 6, Année 1, Asuncion Paraguay.
