= Kalapalo =

Ethnic group

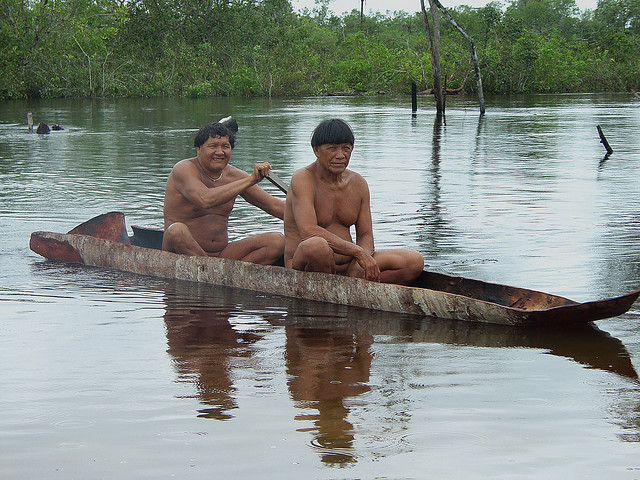
- Kalapalo men canoeing

Total population
- 569

Regions with significant populations
- Brazil (Mato Grosso)

Languages
- Kuikúro-Kalapálo language

The Kalapalo are an Indigenous people of Brazil. They are one of seventeen tribal groups who inhabit the Xingu National Park in the Upper Xingu River region of the state of Mato Grosso. They speak the Amonap language, a Cariban language, and one of four spoken languages in the area. They have a population of 569 as of 2010.

== History ==
The Kalapalo were the first Xingu tribe to be contacted by the Villas-Bôas brothers in 1945. Before the arrival of the Villas Boas, the people had sporadic contact with Europeans. The name 'Kalapalo' was given to this group by white settlers in the late 19th century.

The Cariban dialect of the Kalapalos shows that they have not always lived in the Upper Xingu. The Kalapalo speak a dialect of a language that belongs to the southern branch of the Guyana Carib language family and their closest linguistic relatives are Ye'kuana or Makiritare in southern Venezuela and Hixkaryana language, spoken in the Nhamundá area in Brazil and Guyana.

The Kalapalos and these tribes also share certain oral legends which describe their encounters with the white man and Christian rituals. This oral tradition suggests that the Kalapalos encountered explorer Colonel Percy Fawcett and may have been the last to see his expedition alive.

These stories suggest that the Caribs of the Xingu region left the Caribbean area after being in contact with Spaniards, possibly to escape from them after experiencing violent contact, some time in the second half of the 18th century. Among the Cariban-speaking Indians, the tribe is known as Aifa Otomo, or "those who live in a ripe area."

== Customs ==
Before the creation of the Xingu National Park in 1961, the Kalapalos lived at the confluence of the Tanguro and Kuluene, which are tributaries of the river Xingu. Since then, the Brazilian government has convinced them to settle near the Leonardo station, where medical treatment was made available. However, they frequently return to their former villages where they can grow cassava and cotton and where they can gather shellfish for art and craft-making purposes.

The Kalapalos have a strict code of ethics established by them that distinguish them from other peoples inhabiting the Upper Xingu. They all collectively share their culture as their fishing. Any public quarrels and fights are a serious violation of their code and are punished. They refrain from hunting land animals for fur by simply eating aquatic animals including fish.

== Social organization ==
The Kalapalo social organization is very flexible. The two most important social units in Kalapalo and other upper Xingu societies are the village and household groups. The choice of a Kalapalo to join a group is based on their relationship to an individual in the group, not their religious affiliation, or ancestral rights or obligations . Because of this, membership of villages and households are constantly changing. Leadership extends only over the household group. The leader represents the village in matters that involve other upper Xingu groups ("Countries and Their Cultures").

== Food ==
The Kalapalo fish for their main source of food. May to September is the dry season in the upper Xingu region during which time food is abundant. They used nets, basket traps and bait to lure the fish to the surface of the water, where they would shoot the fish with a bow and arrow. Since contact with outsiders they have used more modern means of fishing like firearms, fishing gear and razors. The Kalapalo also grow piqui fruit, maize, peppers, beans and sweet manioc. When the Kalapalo are planting or harvesting manioc, they often bathe three or four times a day. In Kalapalo society, every adult is responsible for contributing food to the food supply, however, if they don't or can't, they are still allowed a share of the food.

== Beliefs ==
The Kalopalo believe that if they dance during certain ceremonies, the animal spirits will protect the living. The type of ceremony depends on if it is during the dry season or the wet season. Each dance has a certain value that they believe in (Smith). They display certain dietary restrictions based on spiritual practice; they don't eat land animals, only aquatic animals. They believe that if they eat only aquatic animals, it will bring them moral beauty (Basso).

== Activities ==
Some members of their tribe compete in bow and arrow competitions. Their bows are made out of peach palm, a special wood that comes from the Amazon. They also make their arrows out of that wood but have feathers split in two to make the fletching (the part of an arrow that guides its trajectory). These arrows are normally about 2 meters long. They also have games such as wrestling, where the hosts wrestle guests from other tribes, otherwise known as "egitsu" to the Kalapalos. About once a year they have "Jogos Indigenas" (Indigenous Games), their tribal equivalent of the Olympics, where people from different tribes convene and compete against one another.

== Gender roles ==
At every ceremony, it is either the males or females that lead the way, depending on the time of year. If it is the males' turn, the females cannot even look at the males or they will be abused; the males have similar consequences when it is the females' turn. Much of the time, women eat a special diet that they believe makes it easier for them to get pregnant. Kalapalo women have an average of 5 children, so this diet is a big part of their population. In most other tribes, only the males gather the food, but in the Kalapalo tribe, both the male and the females gather it. If they do not come back with food, others will share with them as long as they do not always rely on others.
