= John Fawcett (organist) =

English organist

John Fawcett the younger (1825?–1857), was an English organist.

Fawcett was the third son of John Fawcett, and studied music under his father. He was organist at St John the Evangelist's Church, Farnworth from 1825 till 1842, and afterwards (until his death) at Bolton parish church, a post which had previously been held by his elder brother, and which was taken by the sister for a year in the interval of Fawcett's visit to London. Here, he entered the Royal Academy of Music on 5 December 1845, to study under Sterndale Bennett, and became organist at Earl Howe's Curzon Street church.

On his return to Bolton, Fawcett resumed his duties as organist, teacher, and (1849) honorary conductor of the Bolton Harmonic Society. He obtained the degree of Mus. Bac. at Oxford University on 3 November 1852. His exercise, a sacred cantata, 'Supplication and Thanksgiving,’ was performed at the Music School, the composer conducting, and was published by subscription in 1856. This well-written cantata is the most important of Fawcett's compositions. He died in Manchester on 1 July 1857.
