= Edward Douglas Fawcett =

English mountaineer and philosopher

- Born: 11 April 1866; Hove, East Sussex, England
- Died: 14 April 1960 (aged 94); London, England
- Education: Newton Abbot College; Westminster School
- Occupations: Mountaineer, philosopher
- Spouse(s): Mary Blanche Violet Jackson (m. 1896; died 1928) Vera Pryce (m. 1947)
- Parents: Edward Fawcett (father); Myra Elizabeth MacDougall (mother)
- Relatives: Percy Fawcett (brother)

Edward Douglas Fawcett (11 April 1866 – 14 April 1960) was an English mountaineer, philosopher and novelist.

== Life ==
Edward Douglas Fawcett was born in Hove, Sussex on 11 April 1866. He was the elder son of Edward Fawcett, an equerry to the Prince of Wales (King Edward VII) and the older brother of explorer Percy Fawcett. He was educated at Newton Abbot College in Devon and was a Queen's Scholar at Westminster School from 1880.

Fawcett converted to Buddhism, having taken the pansil (the lay follower vow to the Five Precepts) while with Henry Steel Olcott in Ceylon (modern Sri Lanka) in January 1890. He was an associate of Russian occultist Helena Blavatsky, leading theoretician of the esoteric religious movement Theosophy. He assisted her in her writing and in compiling quotations from scientific works for The Secret Doctrine and particularly the parts of second volume on the topic of evolutionary hypotheses. Fawcett joined the editorial staff of The Theosophist, the monthly journal of the Theosophical Society and wrote correspondence for the magazine Lucifer.

As a science fiction author, Fawcett published his first fantasy novel Hartmann the Anarchist in 1893. He published two adventure novels in the 1890s. His 1894 novel Swallowed by an Earthquake drew favourable comparisons in London to the works of Jules Verne.

He also authored multiple books on philosophy, including The Riddle of the Universe in 1893 on the metaphysical concept of Monadology. In the preface to his 1909 essay, The Individual and Reality, Fawcett concedes to having abandoned Monadology in favour of the metaphysical philosophies of Idealism

Fawcett married his cousin, Mary Blanche Violet Jackson (1872-1928) in 1896, and they lived principally in Switzerland for many years.

Fawcett devoted his life to mountaineering and philosophy. During this time, his philosophy centered around the idea that imagination was the fundamental reality of the universe. Fawcett and his wife became the first people to ascend the Mer de Glace by automobile in 1909.

Fawcett returned to England and in 1947, he married his second wife, Vera Sibyl Elise Dick-Cunyngham, nee Pryce, widow of George Dick-Cunyngham. Fawcett died in London on 14 April 1960.

Fawcett was a keen competition chess player. He took part in high-level tournaments in England in the early 1900s and was a regular competitor at the Hastings, Paignton and British Chess Federation congresses of the 1940s and 1950s. At Tunbridge Wells in May 1902 he drew a game in a blindfold simultaneous display given by the American master Harry Nelson Pillsbury.

== Literary works ==
(1891) The Power Behind the Universe

(1893) Hartmann the Anarchist or the Doom of the Great City a science fiction adventure where the title character Hartmann engages in airship warfare and depicts an aerial bombardment of the city of London. Illustrations were by Fred T. Jane.

(1893) The Riddle of the Universe: Being an Attempt to Determine the First Principles of Metaphysic

(1894) Swallowed by an Earthquake a subterranean fiction adventure about the discovery of an underground world of dinosaurs and cannibals.

(1895) The Secret Life of the Desert an adventure novel following the exploits of archaeologist Arthur Mannors in Arabia.

(1909) The Individual and Reality: An Essay Touching the First Principles of Metaphysics

(1916) The World as Imagination

(1921) Divine Imagining: An Essay on the First Principles of Philosophy.

(1936) From Heston to the High Alps: A Chat About Joy-Flying
