= John Fawcett (of Bolton) =

British organist, choir leader and composer

John Fawcett (8 December 1789 – 26 October 1867) was an English composer, chiefly of sacred music. He was born in Wennington, Lancashire, and began life working as a shoemaker, following in his father's footsteps. His innate musicality soon led him to seek a career in music, at first learning in the village choir, then playing the clarinet in a local militia band. In time he was employed as choirmaster successively at the St. George's, the Wesleyan, and the Independent chapels in Kendal, then, from 1817 at the Holland Wesleyan Sunday school, Farnworth, for seven years. Around 1825, Fawcett moved to Bolton, where he led the choirs at the Bridge Street Wesleyan and the Mawdesley Street Congregational chapels, after turning down the offer of similar posts in Manchester. He taught the piano, organ, harmonium, flute, violin, cello, double bass, singing, and composition, as well as establishing musical meetings at his own house, organising concerts, and assisting at small local festivals.

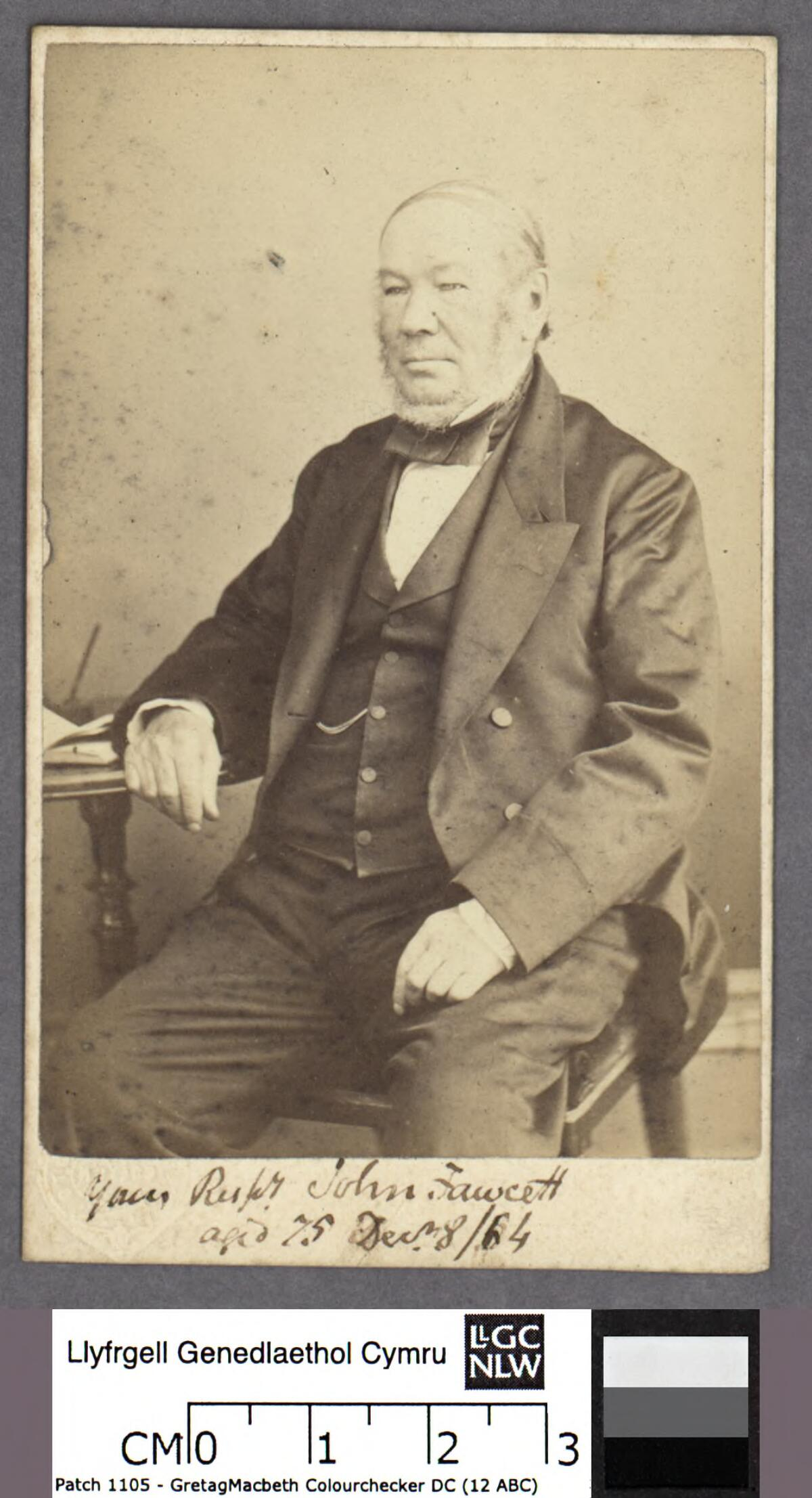
John Fawcett aged 75

He composed numerous sets of psalm and hymn tunes and several anthems, including New Set of Sacred Music, in three parts (1811), A Second Sett of Psalm and Hymn Tunes (1814), The Vocal Instructor (1830), The Harp of Zion (1845), The Seraphic Choir (1840), Melodia Divina (1841, supplement 1854), Music for Thousands (1845), The Cherub Lute (1845), the oratorio "Paradise" (1853), The Lancashire Vocalist (1854), The Temperance Minstrel (1856), Chanting made easy (1857), The Universal Chorister (1860), The Voice of Harmony (24 anthems and pieces), Miriam's Timbrel (1862), The Voice of Devotion (four hundred popular and original hymn tunes, selected and revised by Fawcett, 1862–3), The Temperance Harmonist (1864).

Fawcett died at Bolton on 26 October 1867.

His third son, John Fawcett the younger (1825-1857), was also a composer and organist.
