= List of Danish films of the 1920s =

The following table is a list of films produced in Denmark or in the Danish language in the 1920s. For an alphabetical list of all Danish films currently on Wikipedia see Category:Danish films. For Danish films from other decades see the Cinema of Denmark box below.

Danish title	English title	Director(s)	Cast	Genre	Notes
1920
Prästänkan	The Parson's Widow	Carl Theodor Dreyer	Einar Rød, Hildur Carlberg, Greta Almroth	Comedy	
1921
Blade af Satans bog	Leaves from Satan's Book	Carl Theodor Dreyer	Helge Nissen	Drama	
Saga Borgarættarinnar	Sons of the Soil	Gunnar Sommerfeldt	Stefanía Guðmundsdóttir, Guðmundur Thorsteinsson	Drama	First full-length film shot in Iceland
Helgeninderne	N/A	Benjamin Christensen	Karina Bell, Aage Hertel, Hermann Spiro	Horror	
1922
Heksen; Häxan (in Swedish)	Witchcraft Through The Ages	Benjamin Christensen	Benjamin Christensen; Clara Pontoppidan, Oscar Stribolt; Astrid Holm, Maren Pedersen	Documentary Horror	Coproduction with Sweden
Die Gezeichneten	The Branded	Carl Theodor Dreyer			
Præsten i Vejlby	The Vicar of Vejlby	August Blom	Viggo Wiehe, Gunnar Tolnæs, Ingeborg Spangsfeldt	Crime Mystery	First adaptation of Steen Steensen Blicher's Novel
1924
Mikael	Chained: The Story of the Third Sex	Carl Theodor Dreyer	Benjamin Christensen, Walter Slezak	Drama	Landmark of gay cinema
1925
Du skal ære din hustru	Master of the House	Carl Theodor Dreyer	Johannes Meyer, Karin Nellemose	Comedy	
Glomsdalsbruden	The Bride of Glomdal	Carl Theodor Dreyer	Einar Sissener, Tove Tellback; Stub Wiberg	Drama	Produced in Norway
1926
Klovnen	The Clown	A.W. Sandberg	Gösta Ekman, Karina Bell, Maurice de Féraudy	Drama	
1928
Jokeren	The Joker	Georg Jacoby	Henry Edwards, Elga Brinck	Drama	
The Passion of Joan of Arc	Carl Theodor Dreyer	Renée Jeanne Falconetti, Eugène Silvain, André Berley, Maurice Schutz	Drama	Produced in France	
1929
Højt paa en kvist		Lau Lauritzen, Sr.	Carl Schenstrøm, Harald Madsen	Comedy	
