= Clara Schønfeld =

Danish actress (1856–1938)

- Clara Schønfeld in Master of the House (1925)
- Born: Clara Julie Christensen; 26 August 1856; Roskilde, Denmark
- Died: 5 May 1939 (aged 82); Denmark
- Other name: Clara Kjertmann
- Occupation: Actress
- Years active: 1873–1927
- Spouse(s): Holger Kjertmann (1843-1885); Hjalmar Schønfeld (1863-1924)

Clara Schønfeld (born Clara Julie Christensen; 26 August 1856 – 5 May 1938) was a Danish stage and film actress whose career spanned from the late 19th century through the 1920s.

== Career ==
Born Clara Julie Christensen in Roskilde, Zealand, she was the daughter of Andreas Ludvig Christensen, a bricklayer, and his wife Birgitte Elisabeth Christensen. She made her stage debut with the E.J. Haffgreens Theater Company in Oslo, Norway at the Møllergatens Theater on 17 September 1873. Afterward, she was engaged at a number of theaters in the Danish capital of Copenhagen, including part of the ensemble of the Det Ny Teater when it opened in 1908, as well as a number of theaters in the Danish provinces, such as the Odense Theatre.

From 1918 to 1927, she appeared in 14 silent films, including Carl Theodor Dreyer's 1925 drama Du skal ære din hustru (English release titles: Master of the House and Honor Thy Wife.)

== Personal life ==
Clara Schønfeld married twice. Her first marriage was to actor Holger Emil Rams Hardt Kjertmann. Her second marriage was to theater director and actor Hjalmar Otto Schønfeld in 1893. The couple were married until his death in 1924. She never remarried, and she died in 1939 and was buried in the Assistants Cemetery in the Nørrebro district of Copenhagen.

== Selected filmography ==
- Du skal ære din hustru (English release title: Master of the House) (1925)
- Praesten i Vejlby (English release title: The Vicar of Vejlby) (1922)
