= Skoggangsmand =

1917 novel by Mikkjel Fønhus

Skoggangsmand (English: Outlaw) is the debut novel of Norwegian writer Mikkjel Fønhus, first published in 1917.

== Plot ==
The story is set in rural Norway. The main character is a wild-tempered young boy, Hans Trefothaugen, who gets involved in fights and a stabbing, and ends up as an outlaw living in the forests. While enjoying the independent way of life in the wilderness, he is also desperately longing for the woman Ingrid Ødden, whom he knew from their childhood, and who later married. After various conflicts with the people of the village, Hans eventually ends up being caught and taken to prison.

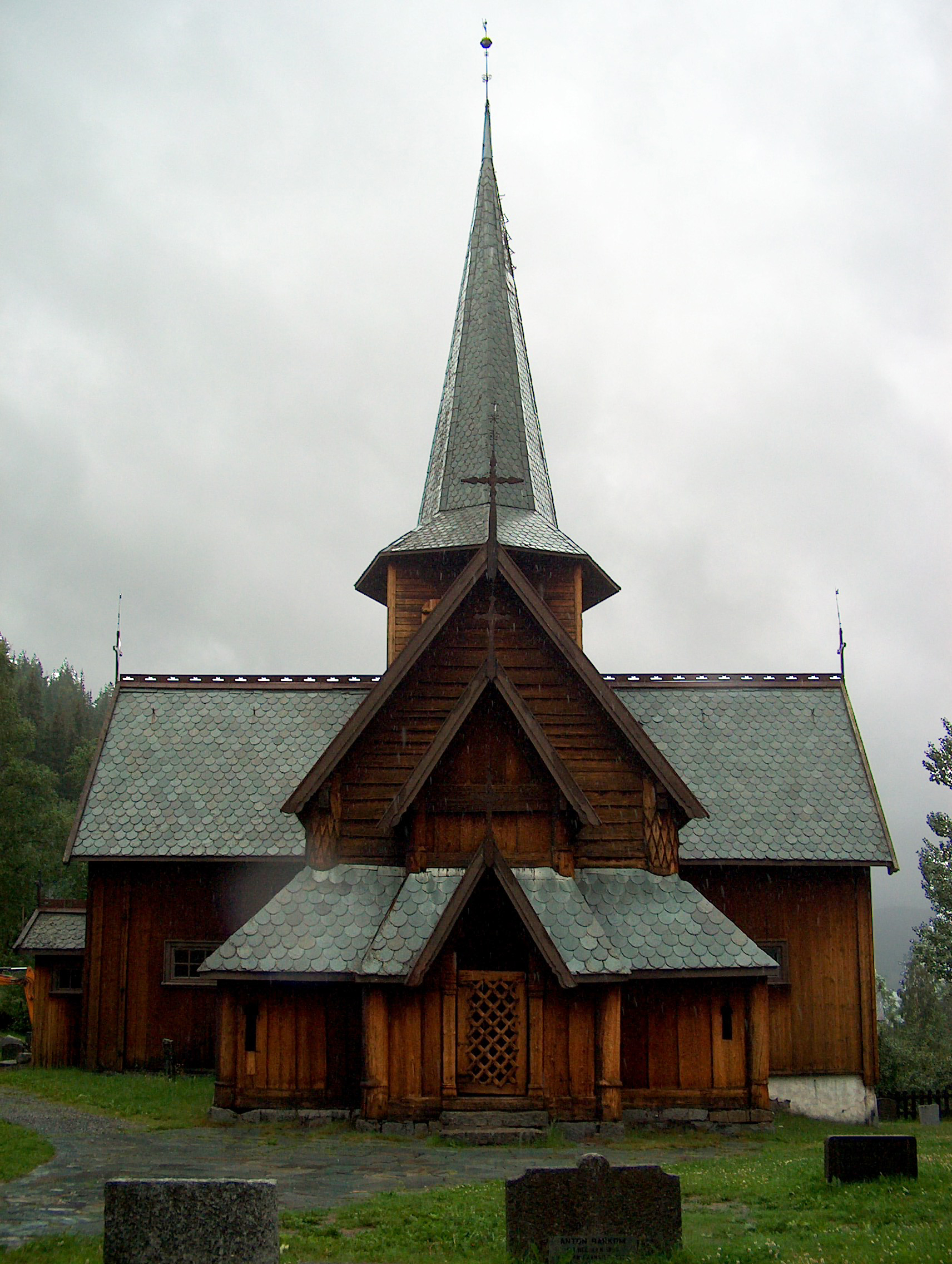
Hedal stave church in Valdres

The legend about the Hedal Church is embedded in the story. During the Black Death, in the middle of the 14th century, the valley Hedal was depopulated, and the valley became a wilderness. A hunter, an outlaw living and hiding in the forest, one day shot an arrow after a capercaillie, but missed and instead struck the church bell, after which the hunter discovered the old church. Entering the church, there was bear at the altar, and the hunter shot and skinned the bear. The hunter subsequently settled at a deserted farm south of the church. The gathering Hedalsmessa, held at Michaelmas, is a central event in the novel.

== Reception ==
The book received little attention by contemporary critics in Norway. It was received with enthusiasm by the later Danish Nobel laureate Johannes V. Jensen, literary critic for the newspaper Politiken. Jensen pointed at the similarities between Fønhus' picturing of the wilderness, and the international genre of wilderness writing.

== Follow-up ==
Fønhus' literary breakthrough came with his next books, first the story collection Der Vildmarken suser, and the subsequent novels Det skriker fra Kverrvilljuvet and Troll-Elgen.
