= Troll-elgen (film) =

1927 film

- Directed by: Walter Fürst
- Written by: Alf Rød
- Based on: The novels Troll-elgen and Skoggangsmand by Mikkjel Fønhus
- Produced by: Helge Lunde
- Starring: Tryggve Larssen; Bengt Djurberg; Julie Lampe; Tove Tellback
- Cinematography: Ragnar Westfelt
- Music by: Erling Nilsen
- Distributed by: Svenska Biografteaterns Filial
- Release date: December 26, 1927
- Running time: 95 minutes
- Country: Norway
- Language: Norwegian

Troll-elgen (The Troll Moose or The Magic Moose) is a Norwegian silent film from 1927. It is based on the novels Troll-elgen and Skoggangsmand by Mikkjel Fønhus. The film was directed by Walter Fürst, and it stars Tryggve Larssen as Sjur Renna.

== Censorship ==
The censors felt that a fight scene between Hans and Gunnar in the film, another violent scene, and intertitles reading Men slegtningen villde ikke være hjelpsom for ingenting 'But the relative didn't want to help with anything', when the sleazy uncle from Oslo tries to have his way with Ingrid, and Denne gang skal du være jenta mi enten du vil eller ikke 'This time you will be my girl whether you want to or not', when Gunnar forces himself on Ingrid, were too strong for the Norwegian public, and these were cut.

== Cast ==
- Tryggve Larssen as Sjur Renna 'Gaupa'
- Bengt Djurberg as Hans Trefothaugen
- Julie Lampe as Turi Trefothaugen, Hans's mother
- Tove Tellback as Ingrid Rustebakke
- Harald Stormoen as Hallstein Rustebakke, a wealthy farmer
- Einar Tveito as Gunnar Sløvika, a horse dealer
- Egil Hjorth-Jenssen as Tølleiv, a servant boy at the Rustbakke farm
- Mimi Kihle as Bellina, a dancer
- Hauk Aabel as Piper, a manager
- Nils Ahrén as P. Rustebakke, a rich relative
