= Ellen Isefiær =

Norwegian actress and stage director

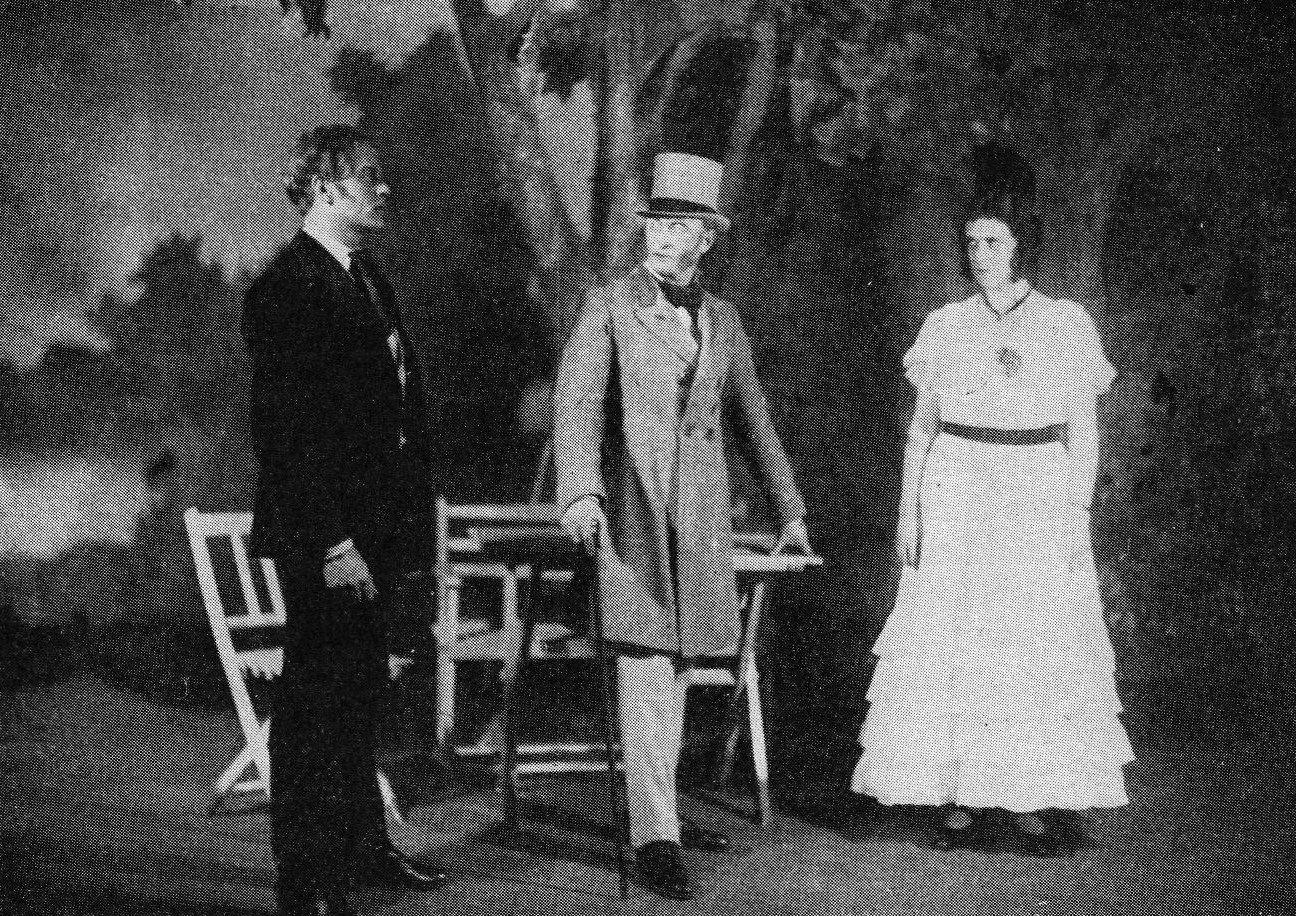
- Isefiær (right) at Centralteatret in a 1928 adaptation of Ibsen's Love's Comedy
- Born: 7 December 1899; Kristiansand, Norway
- Died: 28 September 1985 (aged 85)
- Occupations: Actress; Stage instructor

Ellen Isefiær (7 December 1899 – 28 September 1985) was a Norwegian actress and stage director. She staged more than 200 productions during her career.

== Biography ==
Born on 7 December 1899 in Kristiansand, Norway, Isefiær was a daughter of Thomas Engelhardt Isefiær and Katharine Margrethe Johnsen. In 1931 she married Mads Conrad Langaard.

From 1918 to 1920 she was a student at the National Theatre. She was engaged with Stavanger Teater at Rogaland Teater in Stavanger from 1921, and had her breakthrough as "Elizabeth" in the play Mary Stuart at this theatre. From 1924 to 1931 she was assigned with Centralteatret. She made her film debut in the 1928 film Cafe X directed by Walter Fyrst (1901–1993) and occasionally appeared in films until 1956.

Her first task as stage director was the comedy Mannen som alle ville myrde by Axel Kielland (1907–1963) staged at Trøndelag Teater. She was assigned with Trøndelag Teater from 1939 to 1940. She chaired the Carl Johan Theater from 1940 until the theatre was closed by the German occupation authorities in 1943, and was then assigned with Det Nye Teater until 1945. After the Second World War she mostly worked freelance, except for engagements as stage instructor for Folketeatret from 1956 to 1959, and as artistic director for Trøndelag Teater from 1961 to 1962. She staged a total of more than 200 performances during her career, and was honorary member of the Norwegian Stage Instructor's Association (Norsk Sceneinstruktørforening).
