= Astrid Holm =

Danish actress (1893–1961)

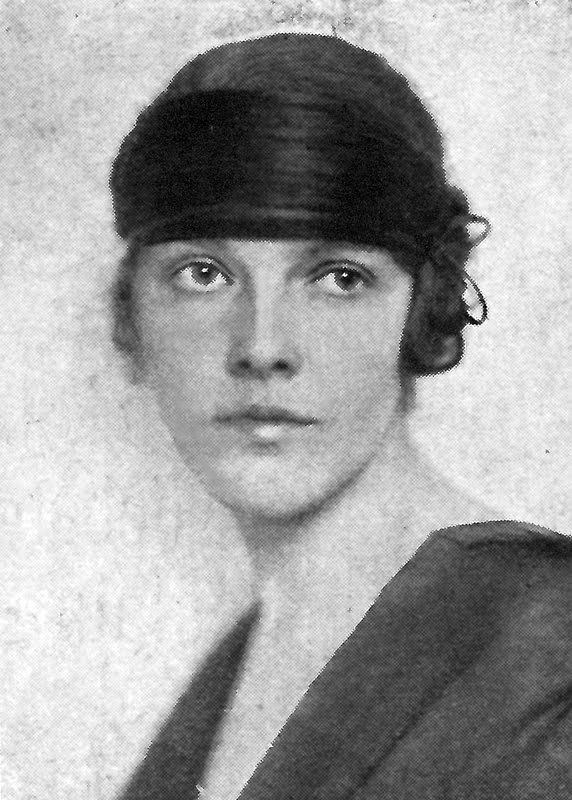
- Holm in 1921
- Born: Astrid Vilhelmine Rasmussen; 29 March 1893; Sorø Municipality, Denmark
- Died: 29 October 1961 (aged 68); Denmark
- Occupation: Actress
- Years active: 1912 — 1948
- Spouse: Holger Holm
- Parent(s): Hans Peter Rasmussen, Maren Sofie Larsen

Astrid Holm (born Astrid Vilhelmine Rasmussen; 29 March 1893 – 29 October 1961) was a Danish theater and film actress whose career began on the stage and in the early silent film era.

== Early life and stage career ==
Born Astrid Vilhelmine Rasmussen in Sønder Bjerge Sogn, Sorø Municipality, Zealand, she was the daughter of hotelier Hans Peter Rasmussen and his wife Maren Sofie Rasmussen (née Larsen). She studied at the Royal Danish Ballet, but left in 1910 to pursue a career as a stage actress. During the World War I years, she performed at Det Ny Teater in Copenhagen. During the early 1920s, she was engaged at the Royal Danish Theatre for four seasons by request of theater director Johannes Poulsen. From 1927 to 1940 she was engaged at several theaters throughout Denmark and often left the theater to live abroad. In the early 1940s, she was engaged at the Frederiksberg Theatre under direction of Svend Melsing and then the Allé-Scenen Theatre under direction of Svend Rindom. From the mid-1940s, she rarely appeared on stage, but occasionally performed in radio theater.

== Film career ==
Astrid Holm made her screen debut for Dansk Filmfabrik in 1917's Søstrene Morelli (The Sisters Morelli) and the following year was under contract to Nordisk Film. Her first film for Nordisk was a role in the 1918 Holger-Madsen-directed Folkets Ven (The People's Friend), opposite Gunnar Tolnæs and Svend Kornbeck. This movie was followed by several popular films for Emanuel Gregers. One of her more popular roles was as Sister Edith in the 1921 Victor Sjöström-directed Swedish silent Körkarlen (The Phantom Carriage). The film was based on the 1912 novel Thy Soul Shall Bear Witness! by Nobel Prize-winning Swedish author Selma Lagerlöf. In 1925, she starred with Johannes Meyer in the Carl Theodor Dreyer-directed drama Du skal ære din hustru (Thou Shalt Honor Thy Wife).

Astrid Holm returned to film in 1942's Ta' briller på, directed by Arne Weel and starring Liva Weel and Hans Egede Budtz. She appeared in four more films throughout the 1940s then retired due to failing health. Her final film appearance was in the 1947 Holger Gabrielsen-directed Mani.

== Personal life ==
Astrid Holm was married to ballet dancer Holger Holm, who died in 1916. During the 1950s, she became reclusive, suffering from a number of ailments. She died in 1961 at age 68.

== Filmography ==
- Søstrene Morelli (1917) as Elvira Morelli
- Det store Mørke (1917) as Maria
- Folkets ven (1918) as Jonna Kamp, Waldo's Wife
- Mod lyset (1919) as Wenka
- Lavinen (1920) as Hanni Kvissel
- The Phantom Carriage (1921) (Swedish: Körkarlen) as Edit
- Häxan (Danish: Heksen. English release titles: The Witches or, Witchcraft Through the Ages) (1922) as Anna
- Den sidste af slægten (1922) as Lise
- Du skal ære din hustru (English release title: Master of the House) (1925) as Ida
- Ta' briller på (1942) as Fru Ester Berg
- Hans store aften (1946) as Anna Tingby
- Diskret Ophold (1946) as Fru Lehmann
- Jeg elsker en anden (I Love Another) (1946)
- Mani (1947) as Fru Frank
