= Viggo Lindstrøm =

Danish actor and theatre director (1858–1926)

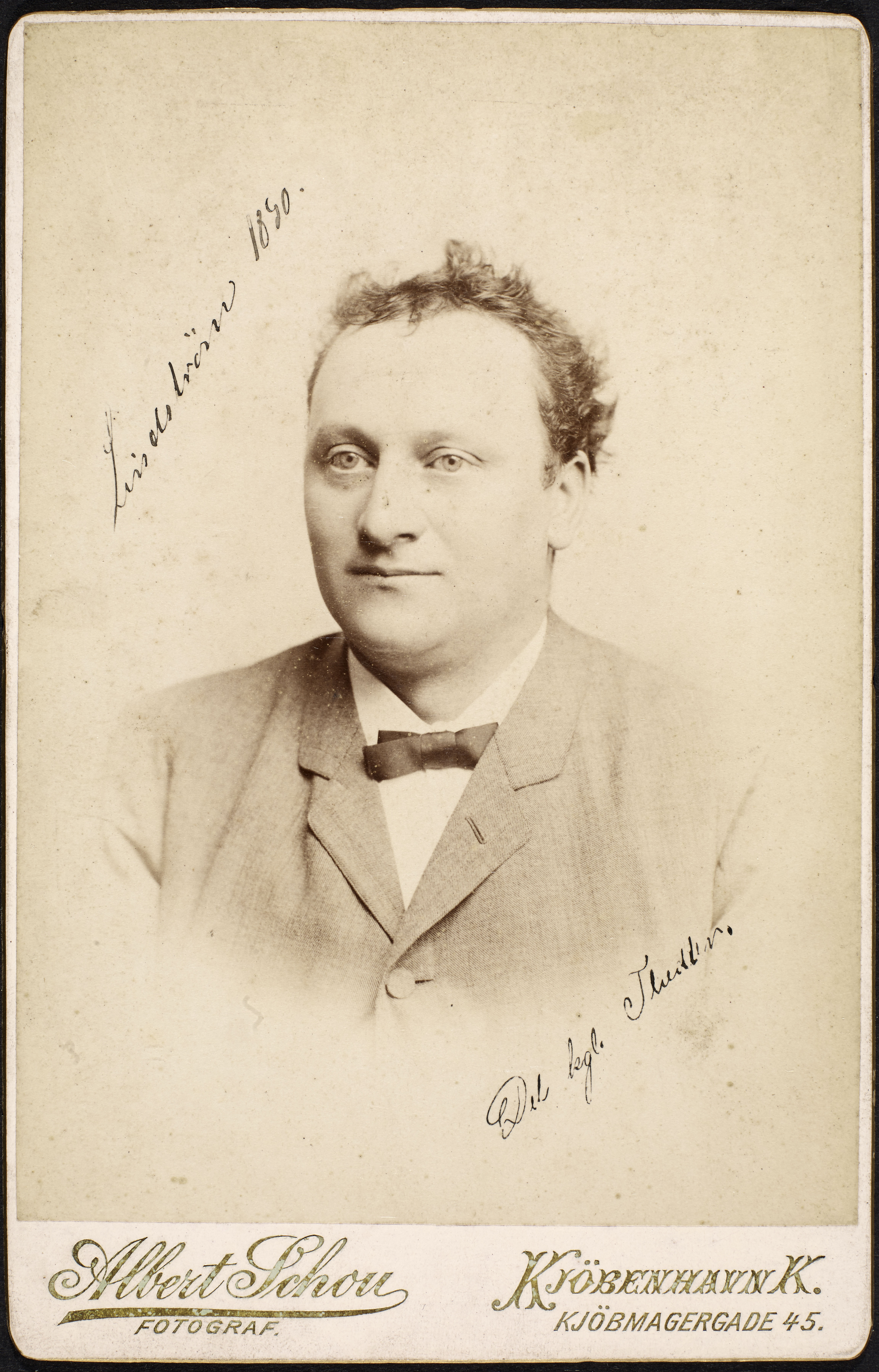
Viggo Lindstrøm, photo by Albert Schou, 1890.

Viggo Lindstrøm (12 January 1858 – 17 June 1926) was a Danish actor and theatre director, founder of Det Ny Teater in Copenhagen. He was married to the actress Vera Lindstrøm.

== Biography ==
Lindstrøm was born on 12 January 1858 in Copenhagen, the son of a Swedish tailor. He first apprenticed as a wine merchant before turning to acting. He made his debut on 3 December 1880 in Stavanger and was then affiliated with Dagmarteatret for many years from its opening, before moving on to Folketeatret where he was expected to succeed J. F. S. Dorph-Petersen as theatre director. However, a fashionable controversy with Dorph-Petersen regarding his wife's notice from the theatre prompted him to resign.

He was then hired by a development company, Bona, to head the establishment of Det Ny Teater. On its opening in 1908, it was the second largest and most advanced theatre in Denmark but he left after three years due to an insignificant debt.

That same year he made his film debut, and after that, he appeared sporadically in films from various companies. In the first half of 1920 he worked for Nordisk Film and had minor roles in two Carl Theodor Dreyer films, Leaves from Satan's Book (produced in 1919 and released in 1921) and Master of the House (1925).

Active until his death in 1926, his two last appearances were in Ole & Axel films for the Palladium production company. He is buried in Frederiksberg Cemetery.

== Films ==
- Vildmanden (1908)
- Den farlige leg (1911)
- En behagelig fejltagelse (1912)
- Det berygtede hus (1912)
- Hjertedoktoren (1913)
- Buddhas Øje (1915)
- Amors Spilopper (1916)
- Blade af Satans bog (1919)
- Gudernes Yndling (1920)
- Hans gode Genius (1922)
- Jafet, der søger sig en Fader I - IV (1922)
- Den sidste af Slægten (1922)
- Smil og taarer (1923)
- Grønkøbings glade gavtyve (1925)
- Du skal ære din hustru (1925)
- Den store Magt (1925)
- Ulvejægerne (1926)

== See also ==
- Cinema of Denmark
