= Brudekronen =

- Directed by: Walter Fyrst
- Written by: Walter Fyrst; Arne Stig
- Starring: Carl Habel; Trygve Svendsen; Ingrid Lysaker
- Release date: 2 October 1944
- Running time: 76 minutes
- Country: Norway
- Language: Norwegian

Brudekronen (The Bridal Crown) is a 1944 Norwegian drama film directed by Walter Fyrst, starring Carl Habel, Trygve Svendsen and Ingrid Lysaker. The film is about the two half-brothers Knut (Svendsen) and Aasmund (Habel) and their family farm, Storlien. Knut is the heir, and wants to demolish the old houses that Aasmund love, to build hotels. There is also a romantic rivalry in their fight over the girl Inga (Lysaker).
