= Dikemark Hospital =

Former hospital in Norway

Coordinates: 59°48′21″N 10°22′50″E

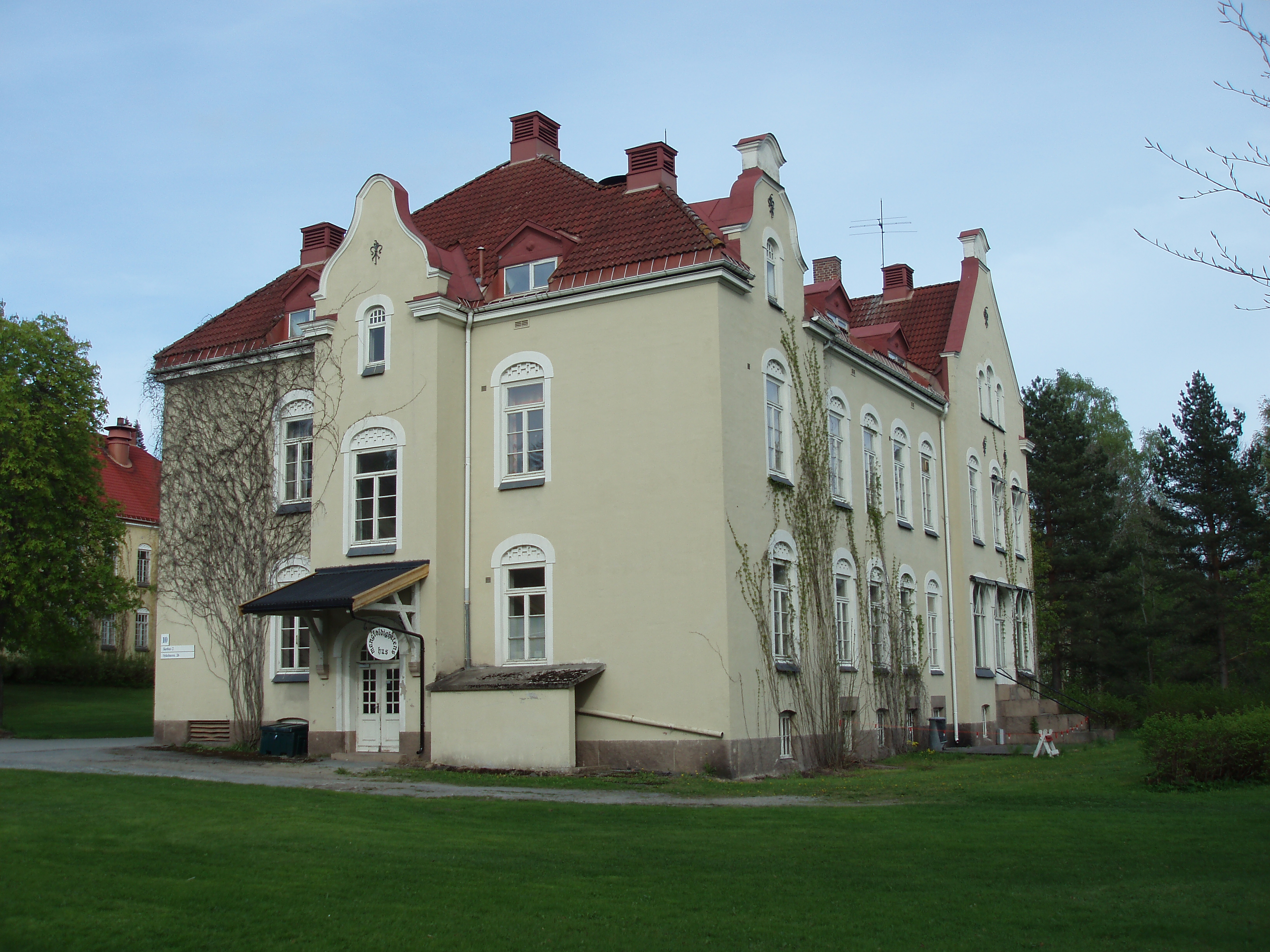
The building in 2007.

Dikemark Hospital is a psychiatric hospital in Asker, Norway. The hospital was owned and managed by the municipality of Oslo but has been a part of Ullevål hospital since 2001.

It was opened in 1905, when the city council of Christiania bought the farm Dikemark, in Asker. Patients were moved from the "Christiania municipal insanity asylum" (Sindssygeasyl) to the newly established Dikemark psychiatric hospital.

The hospital consists of the following departments: National Coordination Unit for Sentences to Compulsory Mental Health Care, Psychosis Unit 1, Psychosis Unit 2, Regional Competence Service for Psychiatry and Developmental Disorders, Regional Section of Psychiatry and Developmental Disorders (PUA), Regional Security Section (RSA), Section for Psychosis Treatment and Security Psychiatric C.

In 1981, several film canisters containing the original cut of the 1928 silent film The Passion of Joan of Arc were discovered in a janitor closet in the hospital.
