= Aage Madelung =

Danish writer

Aage Madelung (July 5, 1872 – October 27, 1949) was a Danish author of German heritage, born in Sweden. After working on farms in Denmark and Southern Sweden while writing poems and articles for the daily newspaper Nordsjælland, he entered the military, and then worked as a farmer in various parts of Russia, later serving as a buyer and representative for several German and English major importers. Madelung also reviewed Danish literature for the Russian symbolist journal Vesy.

Among other positions, he spent many years in Russia as a traveller and adventurer.

After extensive travelling, Madelung wrote stories and novels in a uniquely strongly naturalistic but also poetic style based on his many experiences. His 1918 novel Elsker hverandre (Love One Another), about antisemitism in Russia at the time of the Russian Revolution of 1905, was adapted by German director Carl Dreyer in 1922 as Die Gezeichneten.
