= Einar Rød =

Norwegian actor (1897–1931)

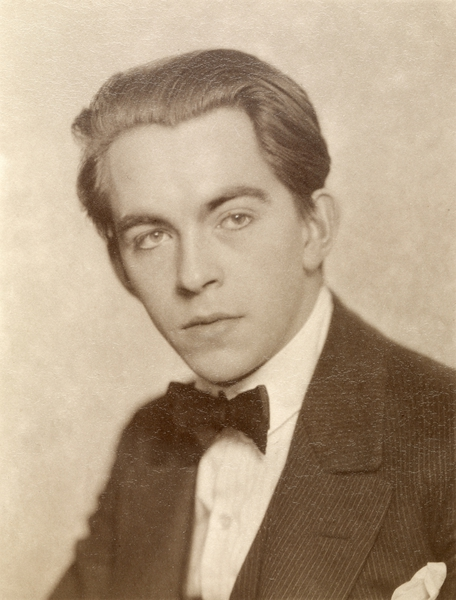
- Einar Rød in 1922
- Born: April 5, 1897; Fredrikshald (now Halden), Norway
- Died: July 21, 1931 (aged 34); Montebello, Norway
- Resting place: Vestre Aker, Norway
- Occupation: Actor
- Spouse: Mary Johnson (1920–1931)
- Relatives: Alf Rød

Harald Einar Rød (April 5, 1897 – July 21, 1931) was a Norwegian actor.

Rød made his theater debut in 1915. Starting in 1924, he performed at the National Theater in Oslo, where he played major roles in plays such as Outward Bound (Norwegian title: Til fremmed havn) by Sutton Vane and Maria Stuart by Friedrich Schiller. He also appeared in some Swedish silent films and showed great talent for the medium, among other things in the role of the new priest in Prästänkan by Carl Theodor Dreyer (1920).

Einar Rød was married to the Swedish actress Mary Johnson, and among other productions they co-starred in the German film Die Stimme des Herzens, directed by Hanns Schwarz.

== Theater roles (selected) ==
- 1920: Maurice in My Father Was Right (Swedish title: Min far hade rätt) by Sacha Guitry (Intimate Theater, directed by Einar Fröberg)
- 1920: Sergei in Professor Storitzyn by Leonid Andreyev (Intimate Theater, directed by Einar Fröberg)
- 1921: He in Nju by Osip Dymov (Intimate Theater, directed by Rune Carlsten)
- 1921: Vasanta in Chitra by Rabindranath Tagore (Intimate Theater, directed by Einar Fröberg)

== Filmography ==
- 1919: Synnöve Solbakken as Aslak, a farmhand at the Granliden farm
- 1920: Prästänkan as Söfren
- 1920: Robinson i skärgården as the newlywed
- 1924: Die Stimme des Herzens as Dr. Axel Wyborg
