= Leaves from Satan's Book =

1921 Danish fantasy film

- Directed by: Carl Theodor Dreyer
- Written by: Marie Corelli; Edgar Høyer; Carl Theodor Dreyer
- Starring: Helge Nissen; Halvard Hoff; Jacob Texiere
- Cinematography: George Schnéevoigt
- Release dates: 17 November 1920 (Norway); 24 January 1921 (Denmark)
- Running time: 157 minutes (121 minutes DVD release version)
- Country: Denmark
- Language: Silent

Leaves from Satan's Book, also known as Leaves Out of the Book of Satan (Danish: Blade af Satans bog), is a 1920 Danish fantasy film directed by Carl Theodor Dreyer and starring Helge Nissen as Satan. This was only the third film directed by Dreyer, who later went on to create such classics as Vampyr (1932) and The Passion of Joan of Arc (1928). The film is structured much like D.W. Griffith's Intolerance (1916) with its episodic nature while evoking F. W. Murnau's Satan (1920). The film ran 157 minutes, but sources list the DVD's running time at 121 minutes.

Troy Howarth states "If not for the presence of Satan, (this film) wouldn't warrant inclusion in a study of the horror genre; in truth it's more of a quaint pageant play than a horror film....The cast emotes to a degree too theatrical for even silent cinema."

== Plot ==
Satan has been cast out of Hell and banished to Earth under decree of Heaven. He can return only after overseeing a series of temptations. However, for every soul who gives in to his tempting, one hundred years are added to his sentence. For every soul who resists, one thousand years are subtracted from his sentence. The film follows Satan throughout much of recorded history, focusing mainly on four short episodes. First he tempts Judas to betray Jesus, then he goes on to influence the Spanish Inquisition, spark the French Revolution and finally he causes the Finnish Civil War of 1918 to occur.

== Cast ==
- Helge Nissen as Satan / The Grand Inquisitor / Erneste / Ivan
- Halvard Hoff as Jesus (first sequence)
- Jacob Texiere as Judas (first sequence) (as Jacob Texière)
- Erling Hanson as John (first sequence)
- Hallander Helleman as Don Gomez de Castro (second sequence)
- Ebon Strandin as Isabel, Castro's daughter (second sequence)
- Johannes Meyer as Don Fernandez (second sequence)
- Nalle Halden as The Majordomo (second sequence) (as Nalle Haldén)
- Tenna Kraft as Marie Antoinette (third sequence) (as Tenna Frederiksen Kraft)
- Viggo Wiehe as Count de Chambord (third sequence)
- Emma Wiehe as The Countess of Chambord (third sequence)
- Jeanne Tramcourt as Lady Genevive de Chambord (third sequence)
- Hugo Bruun as Count Manuel (third sequence)
- Elith Pio as Joseph (third sequence)
- Emil Helsengreen as The People's Commissar (third sequence)
- Viggo Lindstrøm as Old Pitou (third sequence)
- Clara Pontoppidan as Siri (fourth sequence)
- Carlo Wieth as Paavo (fourth sequence)
