= Walter Fyrst =

Norwegian filmmaker

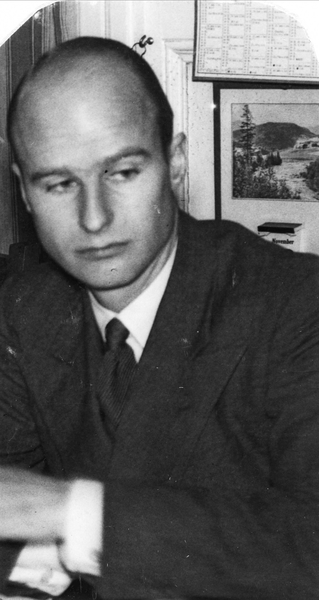
- Fürst c. 1935
- Born: 6 July 1901; Kristiania (now Oslo), Norway
- Died: 23 February 1993 (aged 91); Oslo
- Occupation: filmmaker

Walter Fyrst (né Fürst; 6 July 1901 – 23 February 1993) was a Norwegian filmmaker. He was born in Kristiania (now Oslo), the son of the physician Valentin Fürst and Margarethe Christiane Dedekam. His first film was Troll-elgen from 1927, based on two novels by Mikkjel Fønhus. Other films were Cafe X from 1928 and Brudekronen from 1944. Fyrst made propaganda films for the Nazi regime during the occupation of Norway by Nazi Germany.

== Filmography ==
- 1927: Troll-elgen
- 1928: Cafe X
- 1932: Prinsessen som ingen kunne målbinde
- 1942: Vi er Vidkun Quislings hirdmenn
- 1943: Unge viljer
- 1944: Brudekronen
- 1944: Villmarkens lov
- 1955: Hjem går vi ikke
