= Eugène Silvain =

French stage actor (1851-1930)

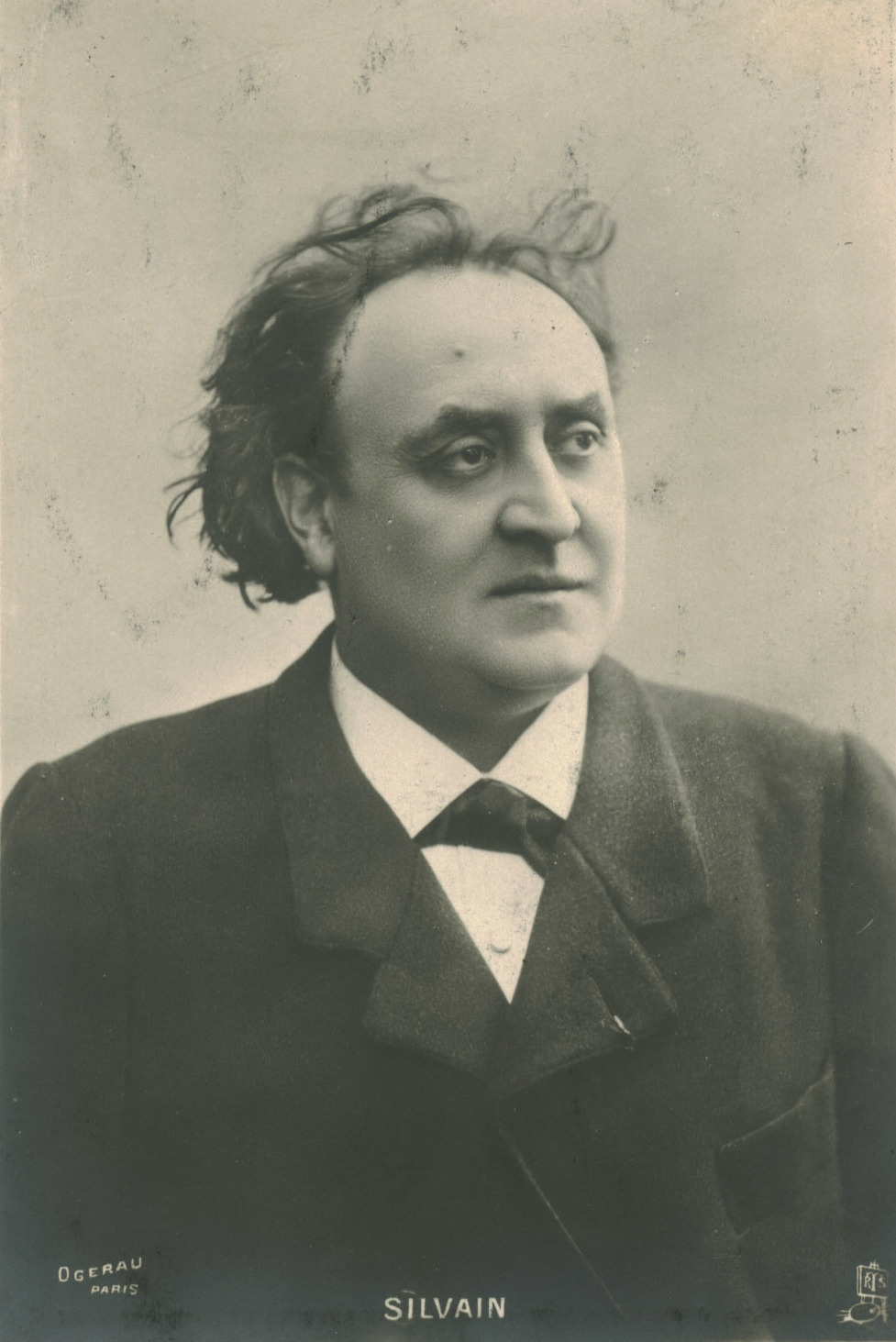
- Eugène Silvain in 1917
- Born: Eugène-Charles-Joseph Silvain; 17 June 1851; Bourg-en-Bresse
- Died: 21 August 1930 (aged 79); Marseille
- Spouse: Louise Hartman

Eugène-Charles-Joseph Silvain (17 June 1851 - 21 August 1930) was a French stage actor, pensionnaire of the Comédie française, sociétaire then dean of the compagny from 1878 to 1928.

== Biography ==
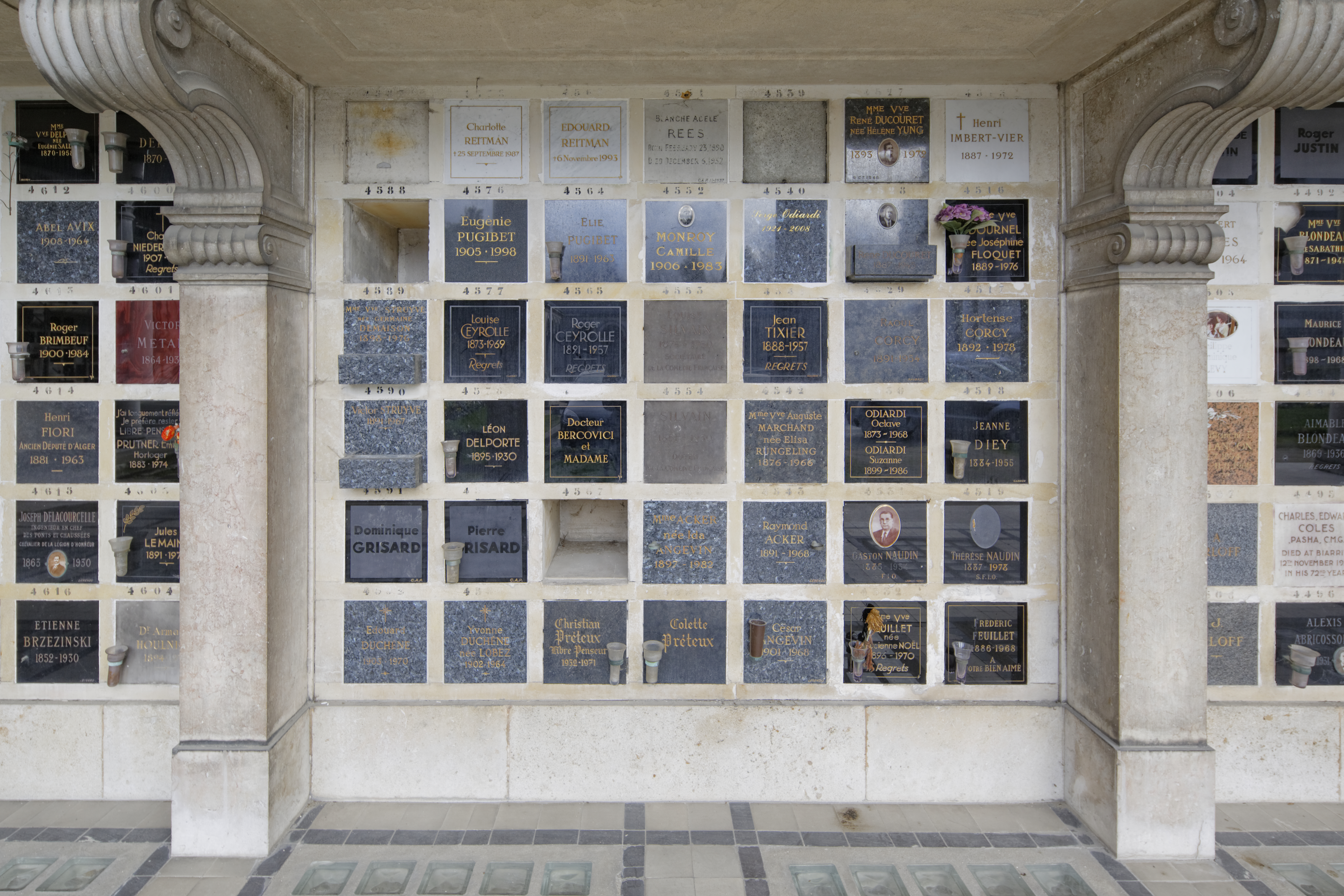
Case 4454 at cimetière du Père-Lachaise.

He left the army to devote himself to opera. He made his debut in Algeria, then played Beaumarchais in Paris. He was received at the Conservatoire d'art dramatique, and later admitted at the Comédie-Française where he was very successful.

In 1883, he became sociétaire of the Comédie-Française. Silvain only had one film acting role, two years before his death, but his appearance as Pierre Cauchon in Carl Theodor Dreyer's classic The Passion of Joan of Arc earned him a small spot in film history.

He married Louise Silvain, a tragedian with a brilliant career at the théâtre de l'Odéon, then at the Comédie-Française.

He was cremated and his ashes are located at the Père Lachaise Cemetery (case 4454 of the columbarium).

== Theatre ==
- 1876 : L'Ombre de Déjazet by Paul Delair (28 October), Troisième Théâtre-Français
- 1877 : L'Amour et l'Argent d'Ernest de Calonne, Troisième Théâtre-Français

=== Comédie-Française ===
Admission in 1878
Named 310th sociétaire in 1883
Dean from 1916 to 1928
Leave in 1928

- 1879 : The School for Husbands by Molière: Ergaste
- 1889 : L'École des maris by Molière: Ergaste
- 1891 : Griselidis by Armand Silvestre and Eugène Morand: le marquis de Saluces
- 1894 : Severo Torelli by François Coppée
- 1897 : Tristan de Léonois by Armand Silvestre
- 1901 : L'Énigme by Paul Hervieu
- 1901 : Les Burgraves by Victor Hugo
- 1902 : L'École des maris by Molière : Ergaste
- 1904 : Le Père Lebonnard by Jean Aicard : Lebonnard
- 1906 : Hernani by Victor Hugo
- 1907 : Polyeucte by Corneille
- 1907 : Electra by Sophocles
- 1909 : La Robe rouge by Eugène Brieux
- 1915 : Le Mariage forcé by Molière
- 1920 : La Fille de Roland by Henri de Bornier
- 1920 : Hernani by Victor Hugo
- 1920 : The Death of Pompey by Corneille
- 1922 : Dom Juan by Molière
- 1922 : Marion Delorme by Victor Hugo
- 1923 : Electra by Sophocles

== Filmography ==
- 1922 : Molière, sa vie, son œuvre (documentary film)
- 1928 : The Passion of Joan of Arc: Bishop Pierre Cauchon
