= Tove Tellback =

Norwegian actress (1899–1986)

- Born: Ruth Lilly Margareta Swanstrøm; July 25, 1899; Kristiania (now Oslo), Norway
- Died: January 20, 1986 (aged 86); Oslo, Norway
- Occupation: Actress

Tove Tellback (née Ruth Lilly Margareta Swanstrøm, July 25, 1899 – January 20, 1986) was a Norwegian actress. She made her film debut in 1926 as Berit Glomgaarden in Carl Theodor Dreyer's Glomdalsbruden.

== Family ==
Tove Tellback was born in Kristiania (now Oslo), Norway as Ruth Lilly Margareta "Toppen" Swanstrøm, the daughter of Lars Magnus Swanstrøm (1868–1939) and Aagot Bjørnson (1872–1968). She married Johan Mølbach-Thellefsen (1897–1973) in 1922, and she performed under the stage name Tove Tellback while using the married name Toppen Mølbach-Thellefsen (a.k.a. Mølback Tellefsen). She married a second time in 1935, to Ludvig Cæsar Martin Aubert (1878–1964).

== Filmography ==
- 1926: Glomdalsbruden as Berit Glomgaarden
- 1927: Troll-elgen as Ingrid Rustebakke
- 1928: Cafe X as Lilly
- 1933: Vi som går kjøkkenveien as Ellen, Beck's daughter
