= Cafe X =

1928 film

Café X
- Directed by: Walter Fyrst
- Written by: Walter Fyrst
- Produced by: Walter Fyrst
- Starring: Tove Tellback; Bengt Djurberg; Ellen Isefiær; Harald Steen; Egil Hjorth-Jenssen; Nicolai Johannsen; Kaare Bertrand; Signe Heide Steen; Hans Erichsen; Reidar Roy
- Cinematography: George Schnéevoigt
- Distributed by: Fürst-film
- Release date: 29 October 1928
- Running time: 100 minutes
- Country: Norway
- Language: Norwegian

Cafe X is a 1928 Norwegian crime film. The film was directed by Walter Fyrst, who also wrote the screenplay and headed the production through his company Fürst-film. It stars Bengt Djurberg and Tove Tellback.

== Plot ==
The film tells the story of journalist Karl Kraft (Djurberg) who uncovers a major weapon smuggling scheme going on in Oslo. Along the way he meets the waitress Lilly (Tellback), who is involved in the affair. He convinces her to abandon the plot, and the two end up together.
