= The Voice of the Heart (1924 film) =

1924 film

- Directed by: Hanns Schwarz
- Written by: Max Jungk; Julius Urgiß
- Starring: Mary Johnson; Fritz Kampers; Ágnes Esterházy
- Cinematography: Axel Graatkjær; Hans Scheib
- Music by: Willy Schmidt-Gentner
- Production company: Trianon-Film
- Distributed by: Trianon-Film
- Release date: 30 October 1924
- Country: Germany
- Languages: Silent; German intertitles

The Voice of the Heart (German: Die Stimme des Herzens) is a 1924 German silent drama film directed by Hanns Schwarz and starring Mary Johnson, Fritz Kampers, and Ágnes Esterházy.

The film's sets were designed by the art director Franz Schroedter.

== Cast ==
- Mary Johnson as Helga Petersen
- Fritz Kampers as Arne Mikkelsen
- Einar Rød as Dr. Axel Wyborg, Arzt
- Meinhart Maur as Helgas Vater
- Ágnes Esterházy as Ebba, Thompsons Tochter
- Margarete Kupfer as Nachbarin
- Jenny Marba as Arnes Mutter
- Clementine Plessner
- Louis Ralph as Carle, Arnes Freund
- Willy Kaiser-Heyl as Thompson, Reeder
- Olaf Storm as Harald Nielsen, Thompson Sekretär
- Hans Brausewetter
- Mario Cusmich as Viktor Lindquist

== Bibliography ==
- Krautz, Alfred (1984). International Directory of Cinematographers, Set- and Costume Designers in Film. Vol. 4. Munich: Saur. ISBN 978-3-598-21434-9.
