= Gudrun Houlberg =

Danish film actress

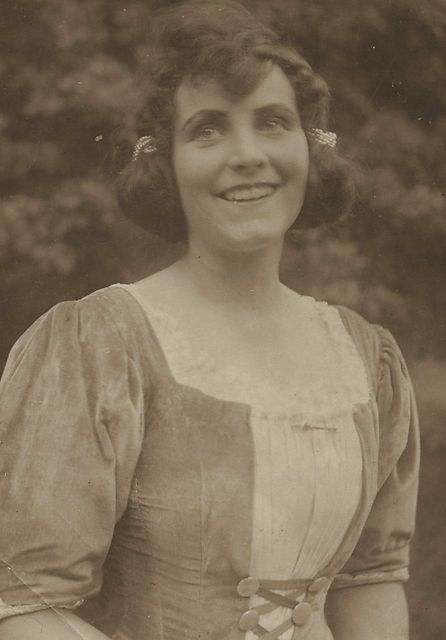
- Born: 21 February 1889; Viborg, Denmark
- Died: 14 January 1940 (aged 50); Rome, Kingdom of Italy
- Years active: 1910 — 1934
- Spouse(s): Helge Nissen (m.1917, divorced); Poul Middelboe (m.1932, divorced)
- Parent(s): Anton Nielsen Houlberg, Sørine Pouline Frederikke Prahl

Gudrun Houlberg (21 February 1889 – 14 January 1940) was a Danish actress who appeared in over 40 films from 1910 to 1934. She is remembered in particular for her roles in Klovnen (1917) and Grevindens ære (1919).

== Biography ==
Born on 21 February 1889 in Viborg, Gudrun Houlberg was the daughter of the merchant Anton Nielsen Houlberg (1863–1949) and his wife Sørine Pouline Frederikke Prahl (1867–1955). She attended the school run by the Royal Danish Theatre in Copenhagen where she made her stage début in 1906. After spending a period at the Dagmar Theatre (Dagmarteatret) from 1914 to 1918, she returned to the Royal Theatre.

She made her film début with Nordisk Film in 1910 when she appeared in the silent film Et gensyn. In 1912 she moved to the film department of Skandinavisk-Russisk Handelshus where she appeared in almost 30 films until she was engaged by Nordisk Film in 1916. In 1917, she played the role of a bareback circus rider in A.W. Sandberg's highly successful Klovnen, together with Valdemar Psilander who became her partner until he died a few months later. She acted in a long series of silent romances and comedies with Nordisk Film. In 1934, using her married name Gudrun Middelboe, she took the role of Frk. Thomsen in Emanuel Gregers' sound film Skaf en sensation (Create a Sensation). With her dark hair and fine features, Houlberg was contrasted sharply with the other Danish star of the period, the fair-haired daredevil Emilie Sannom.

In 1917, she married the opera singer Helge Nissen (1871–1926) and in 1932, the engineer Poul Middelboe but the marriage did not last. Gudrun Houlberg died on 14 January 1940 in Rome, aged 50.

== Filmography ==
The following are listed by Det Danske Filminstitut:

- Skaf en Sensation (1934) - Frk. Thomsen
- Præsten i Vejlby (1931) - Aalsø-præstens kone
- Prinsens Kærlighed (1920) - Melitta, Schönstadts datter
- Manden, der sejrede (1920) - Ellinor, Rewes' datter
- Blind Passager (1920) - Edith, professorens datter
- Det døde Skib (1920) - John, skibsdreng
- Kærlighedsleg (1919) - Amy Walker
- Lykkens Blændværk (1919) - Eva, godsejerens datter
- Grevindens Ære (1919) - Prinsesse Alexis, fyrstedatter
- Skandalemageren (1919) - Mercia, Francis' datter
- Godsejeren (1919) - Ellinor, James' datter
- Den grønne Bille (1918) - Violet, Hornes datter
- Kornspekulanten (1918) - Inger, korngrosserens datter
- Hans Kæreste (1918) - Esther
- Hjertebetvingeren (1918) - Millicent Town
- Ægteskabshaderne (1918) - Daisy, Singletons datter
- Klovnen (1917) - Daisy, Bunding's daughter
- Brændte Vinger (1917) - Agnes West
- Expeditricen fra Østergade (1917) - Alice, Erik's wife
- I Storm og Stille (1915) - Alice, Clark's daughter
- Enhver (1915) - Sylvia, everyone's girlfriend
- Lidenskabens Magt (1915) - Helene, Nyblom's daughter
- Britta fra Bakken (1915) - Britta, Mother Martha's daughter
- Fattig og rig (1915) - Maud, Jones' daughter
- Den Stærkeste (1915) - Jolante, the count's daughter
- Vera (1915) - Vera, Frantz' wife
- Den Fremmede (1914) - Carla, Wang's wife
- Arveprinsen (1914) - Mercedes, the duke's daughter
- Hans første Kærlighed (1914) - Sibyl
- Kvinder (1914) - Mira
- Letsind (1914) - Johanne, the widow's daughter
- Lykkeligt Ægteskab (1914) - Fru Breit
- En Sømandsbrud (1914) - Lillian Bennet
- De Dødes Ø (1913) - Flora, dr. Critius' God daughter
- Katastrofen i Dokken (1913) - Roland's sister
- Den sorte Varieté (1913) - Carmen, varieties dancer
- For evigt (1913) - Agathe, Fritz' wife
- Hjertedoktoren (1913) - Gertrud von Ahrenskjold, Isas niece
- Haanden, der griber (1913) - a bride
- Spejderen (1912) - a young woman
- Det blaa Blod (1912) - Estate owner's daughter and the count's bride
- Dødsridtet (1912) - Kate Holborg, young widow
- Konfetti (1912) - Therese Savain
- Gift dig - gift dig ikke (1912) - Nelli Elmer
- Den hvide Klovn (1912) - circus rider
- Slægten (1912) - Karen, Alvilda's daughter from 1st marriage
- Elskovsbarnet (1910) - Suzanne, viscount's daughter
