= Renée Jeanne Falconetti =

French actress (1894–1946)

- Renée Falconetti in a scene from The Passion of Joan of Arc
- Born: 21 July 1892; Pantin, Seine-Saint-Denis, France
- Died: 12 December 1946 (aged 54); Buenos Aires, Argentina
- Resting place: Montmartre Cemetery, Paris
- Occupation: Actress

Renée Jeanne Falconetti (21 July 1892 – 12 December 1946), sometimes credited as Maria Falconetti, Marie Falconetti, Renée Maria Falconetti, or simply Falconetti, was a French stage and film actress, notable for her acclaimed role as Joan of Arc in Carl Theodor Dreyer's 1928 silent The Passion of Joan of Arc and subsequent mysterious and enigmatic death. There is little recorded information about her life and career on the internet, and much of the existing information about her life is contradictory.

== Early life and career ==
She was born in Pantin, Seine-Saint-Denis, the daughter of Pierre Falconetti and Lucie Lacoste, grew up poor, and was schooled by nuns who did not support her acting ambitions. Despite this, she became a stage actress in Paris by entertaining soldiers during World War I. She made a name for herself in the early 1920s, mainly playing roles in light comedies and musicals.

== The Passion of Joan of Arc ==
When Carl Theodor Dreyer discovered Falconetti in an amateur theatre production of La Garçonne and selected her for the lead role in his upcoming production La Passion de Jeanne d'Arc, she was already a celebrated stage artist at 35 years old. Her portrayal is widely considered one of the most astonishing performances committed to film, and it remained her final cinematic role. Whether or not this is her first film credit is a topic of debate, as some claim that she had two previous film credits, though a supposed interview with Falconetti sees her claim that La Passion de Jeanne d'Arc is her first film role after a few "test pictures".

Many writers have claimed that Falconetti's performance was the result of extreme cruelty at the hands of Dreyer, a notoriously demanding director who pushed her to the brink of emotional collapse. For example, film critic Roger Ebert writes:

For Falconetti, the performance was an ordeal. Legends from the set tell of Dreyer forcing her to kneel painfully on stone and then wipe all expression from her face – so that the viewer would read suppressed or inner pain. He filmed the same shots again and again, hoping that in the editing room he could find exactly the right nuance in her facial expression.

However, in their biography of Dreyer, Jean and Dale Drum say that these stories are based only on rumour and that "there is no evidence that Dreyer could be called a sadist". They quote onlookers who described Dreyer's working relationship with Falconetti: Initially in the production process, "Dreyer and Falconetti would watch the rushes of a single scene together, seven or eight times, until Dreyer could pick out a little bit, maybe a few feet, where the effect was what they wanted, and when they reshot the scene, she could play it without the least inhibition. Just those few feet of film had inspired her." Later, Falconetti became able to play scenes only from Dreyer's explanations, without the need even for rehearsal.

== Subsequent career and death ==
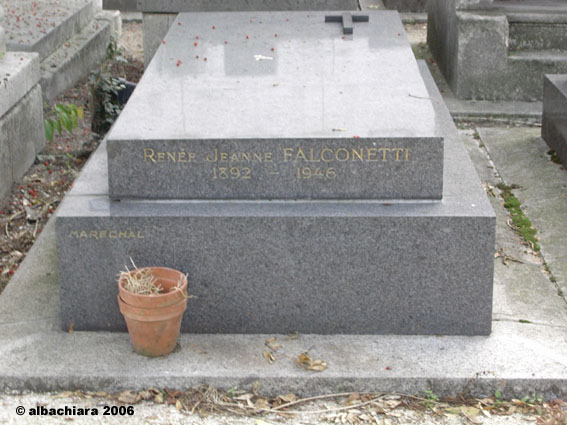
Renée Falconetti's grave, Montmartre Cemetery, Paris

After filming Joan of Arc, Falconetti continued with her career as a producer of light stage comedies, appearing with the Comédie-Française. During World War II, she escaped from France first to Switzerland, Brazil, and then left for Buenos Aires, Argentina.

Falconetti had suffered from mental illness all her life, and in 1946 she died in Buenos Aires, Argentina, an apparent suicide, by a self-imposed restrictive diet after having become significantly overweight. Her remains are interred at Montmartre Cemetery in Paris, section 16 (her grave site is not listed on official maps). Her grandson Gérard Falconetti also became an actor.

== Filmography ==
Year	Title	Role	Notes
1917	La comtesse de Somerive		
1928	La Passion de Jeanne d'Arc	Jeanne d'Arc	
