= Leopold Rosenfeld =

Danish composer and singing teacher

Leopold Rosenfeld (21 July 1849 – 19 July 1909) was a Danish composer and singing teacher. He was also a music critic at the newspapers Danneborg, Musikbladet and Tidsskrift for Musik og Teater.

In 1889, he was titled professor. One of his pupils was the opera singer Helge Nissen.

He was buried at the Jewish Western Cemetery in Copenhagen.

== Compositions ==
- "Aa farvel og vær velsignet (for voice and piano)
- "Asali" (for voice and piano)
- "Bjergpigen" (for solo, choir and orchestra)
- "En nytårslåt" (for voice and piano)
- "Folkevise" (for voice and piano)
- "Ingalill" (for voice and piano)
- "Klokkeklang" (for voice and piano)
- "Opus 3: Fem characteerstykker" (for piano)
- "Opus 17: 5 Clavierstücke" (for piano)
- "Opus 24: DIGTE af Alfred Ipsen og Ernst v. d. Recke"
- "Opus 25: Henrik og Else" (for solo, choir and orchestra)
- "Opus 48: Saïna. Østerlandske stemninger" (for piano)

== See also ==
- List of Danish composers
