= Helge Nissen =

Danish opera singer, voice teacher (1871–1926)

Helge Nissen (5 September 1871 – 5 October 1926) was a Danish operatic bass-baritone, conductor, voice teacher, and film actor who was associated with the Royal Danish Theatre from 1897 until his death in 1926. He notably created roles in the world premieres of two operas by composer Carl Nielsen: Abner in Saul og David (1902) and Henrik in Maskarade (1906). His voice is preserved on a total of 70 recordings made with the Pathé, His Master's Voice and Deutsche Grammophon record companies from 1908 to 1914.

== Life and career ==
Born at Rydhave, Vinderup, near Holstebro, Nissen's brother was the opera singer Niels Frederik Nissen. He studied singing in Copenhagen with composer Leopold Rosenfeld. He made his professional debut in 1897 at the Royal Danish Theatre (RDT) as Mephistopheles in Charles Gounod's Faust. He continued to sing leading roles at the RDT until 1912 when he shifted his career away from singing towards work as a voice teacher, conductor and director at the RDT. Among the many roles he performed on the stage were several parts in operas by Richard Wagner, including Hans Sachs in Die Meistersinger von Nürnberg, Kaspar in Der Freischütz, and Wotan in The Ring Cycle.

Outside of the RDT, Nissen made guest appearances at several Scandinavian opera houses. He made his debut at the Royal Swedish Opera in 1905. In 1909 he sang at the Royal Opera, London. In 1911 he toured North America along with the University of Copenhagen Chorus.

Nissen was the third husband of Danish actress Gudrun Houlberg. In 1921 he portrayed the title role in the film Leaves from Satan's Book, his only film appearance. In 1907 he was named a Kongelige Kammersangere. He committed suicide in 1926 in Copenhagen. He is buried in the Holmen Cemetery there.
