= The Parson's Widow =

1920 film by Carl Theodor Dreyer

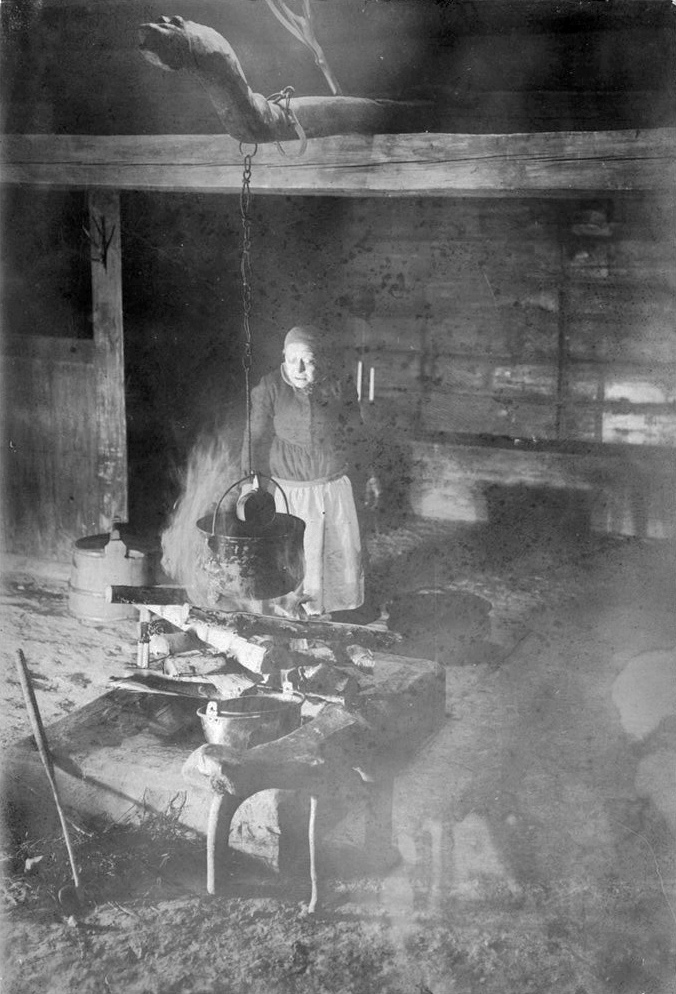
- Still with Mathilde Nielsen
- Directed by: Carl Theodor Dreyer
- Written by: Carl Theodor Dreyer
- Based on: Prestekonen by Kristofer Janson
- Starring: Einar Rød; Hildur Carlberg; Greta Almroth
- Cinematography: George Schnéevoigt
- Distributed by: Svensk Filmindustri; Gaumont (France)
- Release date: 4 October 1920
- Running time: 71 minutes
- Country: Sweden
- Language: Silent film

The Parson's Widow (Swedish: Prästänkan), a.k.a. The Witch Woman, is a 1920 Swedish comedy drama film directed by Carl Theodor Dreyer. The silent film is based on a story Prestekonen by Kristofer Janson.

== Plot ==
Söfren, a recent seminary graduate, and his fiancee Mari make their way on foot through a Norwegian forest to a village where a church is in need of a pastor. Mari's father won't allow her to marry until Söfren obtains a full-time church assignment.

Söfren learns that he is competing with two other men who are affluent scholars from Copenhagen. The three men wait outside the church until the verger calls them in, one by one, to deliver their trial sermons.

The first candidate delivers a sermon on the creation story that promptly puts the entire congregation to sleep. The second candidate is summoned and announces that his sermon topic is "Balaam's ass and God's strange power by which He was able to open the jaws of a dumb animal so that it might speak like a man!" (Numbers 22:28-30)

The verger comes out to summon Söfren and finds him doing handstands. Söfren bounds into the church, surveys the congregation and begins:

"Now, two learned applicants have appeared here before me. One of them took us to Eden, and that is as far back as we can go. Let him stay there! The other one chose the text: Am I Not An Ass? But what has an ass to do on the pulpit? My friends, I will not take you to Eden -- you are too clever. But I will take you to the bowels of the earth, deep in the roaring jaws of Hell!" The congregation is enthralled by Söfren's "fire and brimstone" sermon. Söfren concludes: "And so my friends, beware that you are not swallowed up by the roaring jaws of Hell!"

Söfren's rivals from Copenhagen host a dinner for the townspeople and feel obliged to invite Söfren. The church committee announces that Söfren is their choice for pastor. The committee spokesman then adds that Margarete Pedersdotter, the widow of the previous pastor, has exercised her right to demand that her husband's successor marry her.

Dame Margarete, who is at least a half-century older than Söfren, enters the room. The two pastoral candidates from Copenhagen bolt from the room, hastily climb on their horses and gallop away.

Margarete doesn't take a seat near Söfren but chooses to sit next to the fireplace. Gradually the townspeople also leave the dining hall. After a lengthy period of silence, Margarete approaches Söfren and asks, in that it has grown dark outside, if he would walk with her to the parsonage.

When they reach the parsonage, Margarete invites Söfren inside. As Söfren takes note of the fine furnishings, Magarete lays out another repast, which Söfren devours greedily despite having just come from the town dinner. While he is eating, Margarete asks Söfren if he has a fiancee. Söfren hesitates, then assures her that he does not.

Margarete mentions that it is much too late for Söfren to head back to the inn and suggests he stay in an upstairs room. The next morning Söfren puts on a fine suit of clothes, far superior to his own garments, that was laid out by his bed during the night. Söfren goes downstairs. Margarete is sewing and the table has been set with a fine breakfast of herring, bread and butter, and a canister of schnapps.

After Söfren finishes the schnapps, Margarete takes on the appearance of a smiling 20-year-old. Margarete asks if he would like to marry her; Söfren replies in the affirmative. Margarete calls in her two servants from the next room as witnesses of Söfren's proposal. Margarete assures Söfren they will have separate sleeping quarters and maintain separate lives.

Söfren leaves to tell Mari what has happened, and Margarete follows at a distance. A tearful Mari asks Söfren how Margarete bewitched him and Söfren suggests she had hexed the herring. Margarete arrives and confronts Söfren—who is this woman? Söfren replies that Mari is his sister and asks that she be allowed to stay in the parsonage, to which Margarete assents.

Söfren and Margarete are married. The next morning, Söfren is upset when Margarete's female servant shakes debris from a rug on him from a balcony. Margarete's male servant gives Söfren a raspberry when asked to stop whistling.

Söfren confronts Margarete: "In the future, I suggest you and your companions be less high and mighty. For I am master of this house." Margarete goes to a window and taps on it to summon the bearish male servant. She instructs him: "Master Söfren is too big for his boots. Give him a drubbing!" Afterward, Margarete advises her husband: "I suggest you concentrate on prayer and sermons. Do not play master here. I am master of this house!"

Söfren makes several unsuccessful attempts to have time alone with Mari. One day he notices Margarete climb the ladder to the loft of the barn. Söfren removes the ladder, hoping to trap Margarete in the loft, and goes in search of Mari. Mari, however, is also in the loft, and she starts to climb down without noticing that the ladder has been moved. Mari falls to the ground and Söfren rushes over and calls up a warning to Margarete: "Be careful, Dame Margarete! The ladder is gone!"

Söfren carried Mari into the house and learns that she has broken a thigh bone and suffered a concussion but will recover.

Margarete takes on the role of Mari's nurse and, in return, Söfren begins to grow fond of Margarete.

One day, as Margarete and Söfren sit by Mari's bedside, Margarete confesses: "My first husband and I were engaged for many years when he applied for the post here and learned he could have it only if he wedded the parson's widow. We knew that the widow was weak and could scarcely live long. It was a sore temptation to us. God forgive us ... we built our happiness on the hope of another's death."

That prompted Söfren to confess: "Mari and I are not sister and brother -- she is my fiancee. We have also waited for your death, Dame Margarete."

Margarete appears to have initially been taken aback, then her face softens and she murmurs "Poor children!"

From that moment, Söfren and Mari have no trouble spending time together and Margarete spends most of her time in the churchyard, visiting her husband's grave.

One morning Margarete does not come down to breakfast. Söfren and Mari go to her bedroom, where they find her in a peaceful repose after dying in her sleep. Söfren finds a note beside the bed: "Do not forget, when my mortal remains are taken away, to put a horseshoe over the door and to strew linseed after me so that I shall not haunt you."

Margarete is buried beside her husband. As Söfren and Mari stand over her grave, Söfren remarks: "We owe her a great debt, Mari. She taught you to keep a good home and she taught me to be an honorable man."

== Cast ==
- Einar Rød as Söfren
- Hildur Carlberg as Margarete Pedersdotter
- Greta Almroth as Mari
- Olav Aukrust as First Candidate
- Emil Helsengreen as Steinar The Gardener
- Mathilde Nielsen as Gunvor
- Lorentz Thyholt as The Beadle
- Kurt Welin as Second Candidate

== Trivia ==
Both exterior and interior shots were filmed at the Garmo Stave Church and the Maihaugen museum.

== About the restoration ==
An acetate duplicate negative derived from an acetate master made from the now-lost camera negative was scanned by the Swedish Film Institute in 2018. Full-length intertitles were re-created from an original text-list, with a design based on a handful of surviving flash-titles in the master. The color scheme with both tintings and tonings was also re-created from notes in the master.

== Bibliography ==
37th Pordenone Silent Film Festival Catalogue: Le Giornate del Cinema Muto XXXVII Edizione
