= Der Vildmarken suser =

Der Vildmarken suser is a story collection from 1919 by Norwegian writer Mikkjel Fønhus.

One of the stories, about the large killer bear "Rugg" in the Vassfaret forests, was published as a children's book in 1965, Fortellingen om slagbjønnen Rugg. This book, and the subsequent animal novels Det skriker fra Kverrvilljuvet and Troll-Elgen, was Fønhus' breakthrough, and made him known for his ability to picture animal life.
