= Troll-Elgen =

1921 novel by Mikkjel Fønhus

Troll-Elgen is a novel from 1921 by Norwegian writer Mikkjel Fønhus. The story is about the large moose "Rauten" and the hunter "Gaupe", and ends up with both the hunter and the hunted losing their lives. The novel was adapted into a film in 1927.

His story collection Der Vildmarken suser and the follow-up novels Det skriker fra Kverrvilljuvet and Troll-Elgen, gave Fønhus a wide reputation for his ability to picture animal life.
