= Die Gezeichneten (film) =

1922 film

- Thorleif Reiss and Polina Piekowskaja
- Directed by: Carl Theodor Dreyer
- Written by: Carl Theodor Dreyer
- Produced by: Otto Schmidt
- Starring: see below
- Cinematography: Friedrich Weinmann
- Production company: Primus-Film GmbH
- Release dates: 7 February 1922 (Denmark); 23 February 1922 (Germany)
- Running time: 95 minutes
- Country: Germany
- Languages: German intertitles (German release); Danish intertitles (Danish release)

Die Gezeichneten (translation: The Stigmatised, English title: Love One Another) is a 1922 German silent film directed by Carl Theodor Dreyer, based on the 1918 novel Elsker hverandre (Love one another) by Danish author Aage Madelung. The plot follows a young Jewish woman as she experiences antisemitism and revolution in late 19th century Russia. It is noted as one of the earliest motion pictures to deal with the persecution of Jewish people. Danish film historian Casper Tybjerg described the film as "a powerful attack on anti-Semitic prejudice".

== Plot ==
In the Russian Empire at the end of the 19th century, Hanne Liebe is a little Jewish girl who lives in a small town on the Dnieper where she is submitted to racial prejudice notably at the Christian-Russian school that she attends.

Hanne-Liebe grows up and in her last year at school, she falls in love with a Russian boy, Sasha. Fedya, the son of her neighbour, the rich and anti-semitic merchant Suchowerski, with whom she played when she was a child, spreads a rumour that they are having an affair. As a result, she is expelled from school. Her mother asks a matchmaker to find a suitable husband for her, in order to get her married as soon as possible. Revolted by the man presented to her, Hanne-Liebe flees to Saint Petersburg, to live with her brother Yakov.

Yakov, who was cursed by his father when he became a Christian Orthodox, is now a successful lawyer. He is very happy to see his sister again but his wife refuses that she lives with them. Jakov arranges for her to live with some childless friends, the Florovs, where she is very happy. Sasha is also living in St. Petersburg and he has joined one of the revolutionary circles which are flourishing in a context of social unrest.

At a literary and political evening organised by the Florovs, Hanne Liebe meets Sasha again, who introduces her to his friend Rylowitsch, another revolutionary. Yakov recognises him as a secret police agent and asks Sasha to come to his office the following day to warn him but Sasha is arrested the same evening. Hanne Liebe, worried that Sasha had not come to his appointment goes looking for him and is arrested in her turn. Thanks to Yakov she is released, but only under the condition that she goes back to her hometown. As the social unrest is increasing, the head of the secret police decides to foment some pogroms to re-direct the people discontent towards the Jews. Rylowitsch dressed as a monk travels through the country, stirring up anti-Jewish feelings with false rumours.

In 1905, a general strike is decided and the revolution spreads through the country. The Tsar must make some concessions and adopts the October manifesto granting new civil rights and the release of political prisoners. Yakov, having learned that his mother is dying travels back to his home town, where Suchowerski and Rylowitsch are busy fomenting hostility against the Jewish population.

After a procession in honor of the Tsar the people led by Suchowerski and Rylowitsch storm the Jewish ghetto, killing people, plundering their property, and setting the synagogue ablaze. Yakov is shot dead by Rylowitsch and Hanne-Liebe is chased by Fedya. Meanwhile, Sasha, who had been released from jail, convinces the revolutionary leaders to let him use a locomotive to go back to his hometown where he feels that Hanne Liebe is in danger. He arrives just in time to rescue her from Fedya whom he shoots dead. Hanne-Liebe and Sasha join the crowd of Jews fleeing Russia.

== Cast ==
- Polina Piekowskaja as Hanne-Liebe
- Wladimir Gaidarow as Jakow Segal
- Thorleif Reiss as Alexander Krasnow (Sasha)
- Adele Reuter-Eichberg as Hanne-Liebe's mother
- Johannes Meyer as Rylowitsch
- Richard Boleslawski as Gawrik Suchowerski (Fedja)
- J.N. Douvan Tarzow as Suchowerski
- Sylvia Torf as Zipe, Hanne-Liebe's sister
- Hugo Döblin: Abraham, Zipe's husband
- Elisabeth Pinajeff: Manja
- Emmy Wyda: Anna Arkadjewna, School mistress
- Tatjana Tarydina: Natalia Petrowna, teacher
- Friedrich Kühne: Head of the Police

== Production ==
This is the first film directed by Dreyer in Germany. It was shot near Berlin, in Groß Lichterfelde Ost, where a city consisting of 25 different buildings was built, with a synagogue and an orthodox church and separate Russian and Jewish quarters.

In order to guarantee the authenticity of the film, Dreyer together with the set designer Jens Lind had travelled to Lublin in Poland, where he had visited the Jewish quarter. In addition, several of the actors were coming from Moscow theaters and for the crowd scenes, actual Jewish refugees from Russia were employed, some of them having personally experienced some fifteen years before events similar to the pogrom described in the film.

== Preservation and restoration ==
The original German version is considered lost but a version with Russian intertitles has been found at the Cinémathèque de Toulouse and, on that basis, a digitally restored version was created by the Danish Film Institute in 2006. New intertitles were created on the basis of the original script by Dreyer completed by a Swedish censorship list.
