= Stub Wiberg =

Norwegian actor

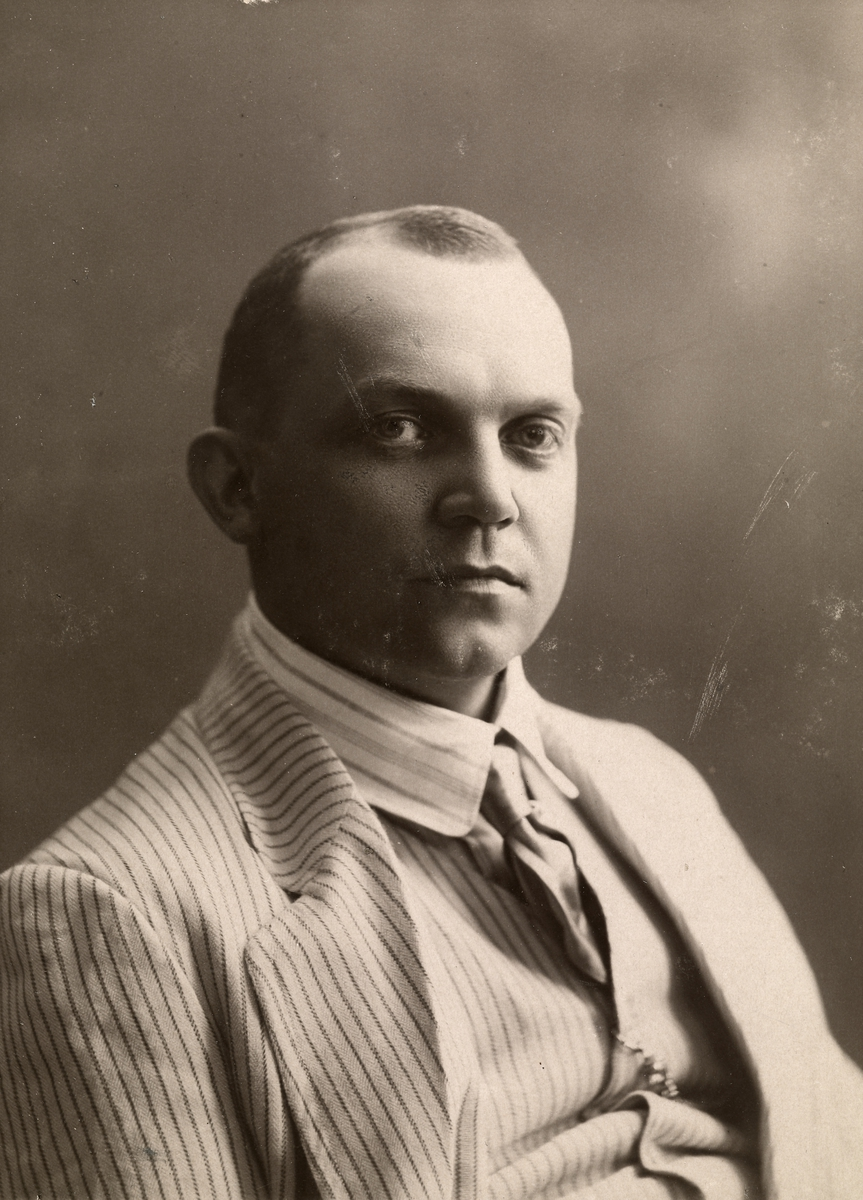
- Lauritz Stub Wiberg in 1908
- Born: 11 March 1875; Bergen
- Died: 24 June 1929; Oslo
- Occupation: Actor
- Relatives: Christian Koren-Wiberg
- Awards: Knight of the Order of the Polar Star; Knight First Class of the Order of St. Olav (1928)

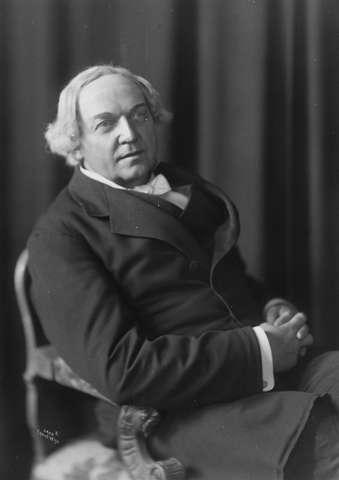
Stub Wiberg as the character Den gamle Præst ("The old priest") in 1910.

Lauritz Stub Wiberg (11 March 1875 – 24 June 1929) was a Norwegian actor. He made his stage debut at the Bergen theatre Den Nationale Scene in 1898, and played at Nationaltheatret in Kristiania from 1903.

He participated in the film Glomdalsbruden from 1926.

He was decorated as Knight, First Class of the Royal Norwegian Order of St. Olav in 1928, and was Knight of the Swedish Order of the Polar Star.
