= The Bride of Glomdal =

1926 film

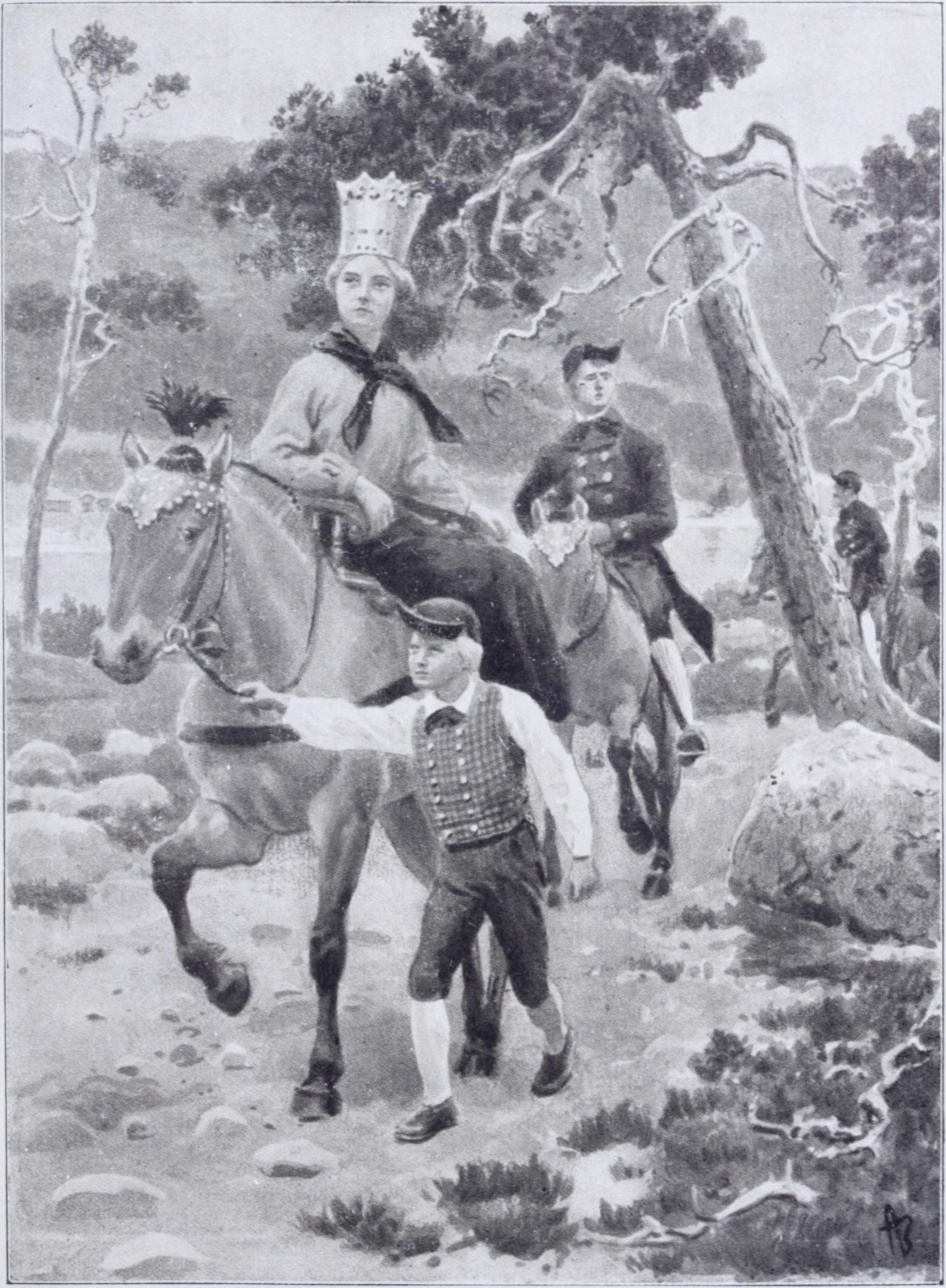
- Directed by: Carl Theodor Dreyer
- Written by: Jacob Breda Bull (novel); Carl Theodor Dreyer
- Starring: Einar Sissener; Tove Tellback; Stub Wiberg
- Cinematography: Einar Olsen
- Edited by: Carl Theodor Dreyer
- Release date: 1 January 1926
- Running time: 115 min.
- Country: Norway
- Language: Silent film Norwegian intertitles

The Bride of Glomdal (Norwegian: Glomdalsbruden) is a 1926 film directed by Carl Theodor Dreyer. It is based on the stories "Glomdalsbruden" and "Eline Vangen" by Jacob Breda Bull.

== Cast ==
- Einar Sissener as Tore Braaten
- Tove Tellback as Berit Glomgaarden
- Stub Wiberg as Ola Glomgaarden
- Harald Stormoen as Jakob Braaten
- Alfhild Stormoen as Kari Braaten, his wife
- Oscar Larsen as Berger Haugsett
- Einar Tveito as Gjermund Haugsett, his son
- Rasmus Rasmussen as the priest
- Sophie Reimers as the priest's wife
- Julie Lampe as Old Guri
