= Det skriker fra Kverrvilljuvet =

1920 novel by Mikkjel Fønhus

Det skriker fra Kverrvilljuvet is a novel first published in 1920 by Norwegian writer Mikkjel Fønhus.

His story collection Der Vildmarken suser and the follow-up novels Det skriker fra Kverrvilljuvet and Troll-Elgen, gave Fønhus a wide reputation for his ability to picture animal life.
