= Master of the House =

1925 film by Carl Theodor Dreyer

- Poster
- Du skal ære din hustru
- Directed by: Carl Theodor Dreyer
- Written by: Carl Theodor Dreyer (screenplay); Svend Rindom (play and screenplay)
- Starring: Johannes Meyer; Astrid Holm
- Cinematography: George Schnéevoigt
- Edited by: Carl Theodor Dreyer
- Music by: Lars Fjeldmose
- Distributed by: Palladium Film
- Release date: 5 October 1925
- Running time: 107 minutes
- Country: Denmark
- Language: Silent

Master of the House (Danish: Du skal ære din hustru, literally Thou Shalt Honour Thy Wife) is a 1925 Danish silent drama film directed and written by acclaimed filmmaker Carl Theodor Dreyer. The film marked the debut of Karin Nellemose, and it is regarded by many as a classic of Danish cinema.

== Plot ==
Master of the House (1925)

Viktor Frandsen, embittered by losing his business, is a tyrant at home, constantly criticizes his patient, hard-working wife Ida and their three children. He does not appreciate the effort it takes to maintain a household. While his wife is resigned and browbeaten, his old nanny, nicknamed Mads by all, openly defends her. When Mrs. Kryger, Ida's mother, pays a visit, he is rude to her. Finally, he issues an ultimatum: either Mrs. Kryger and the openly hostile Mads (who regularly helps the family) are gone by the time he returns or the marriage is over.

Mads orchestrates a plan that will force him to rethink his notions of being the head of a household. With the help of Mrs. Kryger, she persuades a reluctant Ida to go away for a while and rest while she sees to Viktor and the children. Then, she institutes a new regime, ordering Viktor to take over many of Ida's duties; Viktor obeys, cowed by his memories of the strict discipline she imposed on him when he was a child in her care. Meanwhile, Ida, no longer distracted by her many duties, feels the full misery of her situation and has a breakdown.

As time goes by, Viktor comes to fully appreciate his wife, and as he does love her dearly and longs for her return. When Ida, fully recovered, is allowed to come back, Viktor and the children are ecstatic. Ida's mother then shows him a newspaper advertisement offering an optometrist's shop for sale and gives him a check to buy it.

== Cast ==
- Johannes Meyer as Viktor Frandsen
- Astrid Holm as Ida Frandsen
- Karin Nellemose as Karen Frandsen, their oldest child
- Mathilde Nielsen as Mads
- Clara Schønfeld as Alvilda Kryger
- Johannes Nielsen as Doctor
- Petrine Sonne as Laundress
- Aage Hoffman as Dreng, son
- Byril Harvig as Barnet, son
- Viggo Lindstrøm
- Aage Schmidt
- Vilhelm Petersen

== Reception ==
The film has been evaluated as a "spare, compassionate, and astute social satire".

== Home media ==
Master of the House was released to the Criterion Collection on Blu-ray and DVD.
