= Mikkjel Fønhus =

Norwegian writer

- Born: 14 March 1894; Sør-Aurdal, Norway
- Died: 28 October 1973 (aged 79)
- Occupations: Journalist, novelist and short story writer
- Known for: Stories set in the wilderness, often featuring animals and animal behaviour

Mikkjel Fønhus (14 March 1894 – 28 October 1973) was a Norwegian journalist, novelist and short story writer. Fønhus' stories are often set in the wilderness, featuring animals and animal behaviour.

== Personal life ==
Mikkel Arnesen Fønhus was born on the Nordre Fønhus farm in the Valdres Valley in Sør-Aurdal Municipality in Oppland county, Norway to the merchant Arne Mikkelsen Fønhus (1860–1896) and Olava Olsdatter Storsveen (1867–1948). After six years of primary school, he attended four years of middle school in Aurdalsbyen and three years of secondary school in Oslo. He also started studying law at the University of Oslo. His marriage to the teacher Helga Karlsgot in 1926 ended in divorce, and he then married Margrethe Frøshaug in 1934.

== Career ==
Fønhus made his literary debut with the novel Skoggangsmand in 1917, a story about an outlaw. His breakthrough came with the next book, Der Vildmarken suser (1919), inspired by Jack London's The Call of the Wild. His next books were Det skriker fra Kverrvilljuvet (1920) and Troll-Elgen (1921). These three books were all set in the wilderness, featuring animals and animal behavior. In 1922 he published a novel from Spitsbergen, Under polarlyset.

The stories of Fønhus also made frequent references to folk tales. Among his many qualities as a writer was his ability to develop the oral storytelling tradition. An example is the story "Ropet fra Helvetesjuvet" in the collection Raudalsdansen from 1924. In 1926 he wrote the novel Reinsbukken på Jotunfjell, in 1927 the collection Vandringen mot nord, and in 1929 Skogenes eventyrer, stories about a fox. He wrote stories about animals such as beaver, marten, wolves and lynx. He wrote about birds such as goose and eagle owl.

Fønhus concentrated in about writing about life in nature itself. His books sold well and with the growing ecology movement, Mikkjel Fønhus appeared as a pioneer in the fight for preserving nature. He published 43 books on these themes during his life. Another 34 were published after his death. He work has been translated into Swedish, Danish, Finnish, German, French, English, Dutch, Czech and Polish. There is an exhibit of his work at Bagn Bygdesamling, a small museum located in Sør-Aurdal, Norway.

== Awards ==
- Gyldendal's Endowment 1952
- Royal Norwegian Order of Merit, 1963
- Kloster-medaljen, 1963
- Mads Wiel Nygaards Endowment, 1965
- Språklig samlings litteraturpris, 1966

== Other sources ==
- Brandrud, Rolf Drømmejegeren - en biografi om Mikkjel Fønhus (Aschehoug forlag, Oslo: 1993) ISBN 82-03-16967-8
- Stensrud, Gudbjørg Fønhus Mikkjel, far min (Aschehoug forlag, Oslo: 1985) ISBN 82-03-15196-5
- Brenne, Tom Mikkjel Fønhus: En bibliografi (Universitetsbiblioteket. Oslo: 1993) ISBN 82-7000-224-0
- Børte, Torbjørn Mikkjel Fønhus: --fra Nissebakken til Thika River (Aschehoug forlag, Oslo: 1972) ISBN 82-03-05140-5
