= Det Ny Teater =

Theatre in Copenhagen, Denmark

Coordinates: 55°40′24″N 12°33′19″E

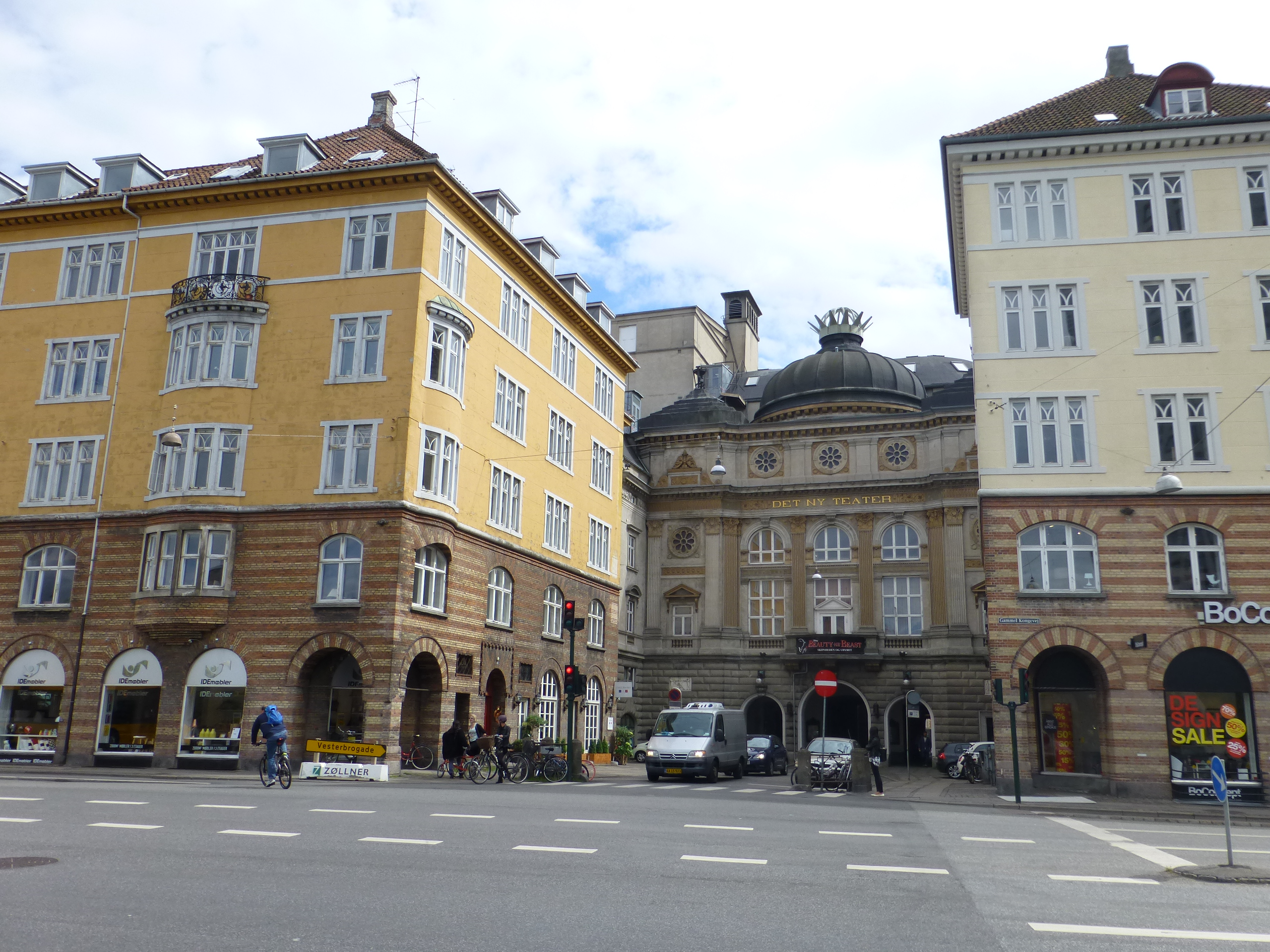
- The theatre seen from Gammel Kongevej
- Interactive map of Det Ny Teater
- Address: Gammel Kongevej 29; Copenhagen V Denmark
- Capacity: 1,000 (main); 300 (Sceneriet)
- Current use: Theatre

Construction
- Opened: 1908
- Closed: 1990–1994
- Years active: 104
- Architect: Lorenz Gudme

Website
- http://www.detnyteater.dk/

Det Ny Teater (English: The New Theatre) is an established theatre in Copenhagen, Denmark, first opened in 1908. It is based in a building which spans a passage between Vesterbrogade and Gammel Kongevej in Copenhagen's theatre district on the border between Vesterbro and Frederiksberg.

With more than 12,000 m^{2} it is one of Denmark's largest theaters. It has two stages, the main auditorium which seats more than 1,000 and Sceneriet, a smaller theatre established in the cellar in 1994.

== History ==
=== Establishment ===
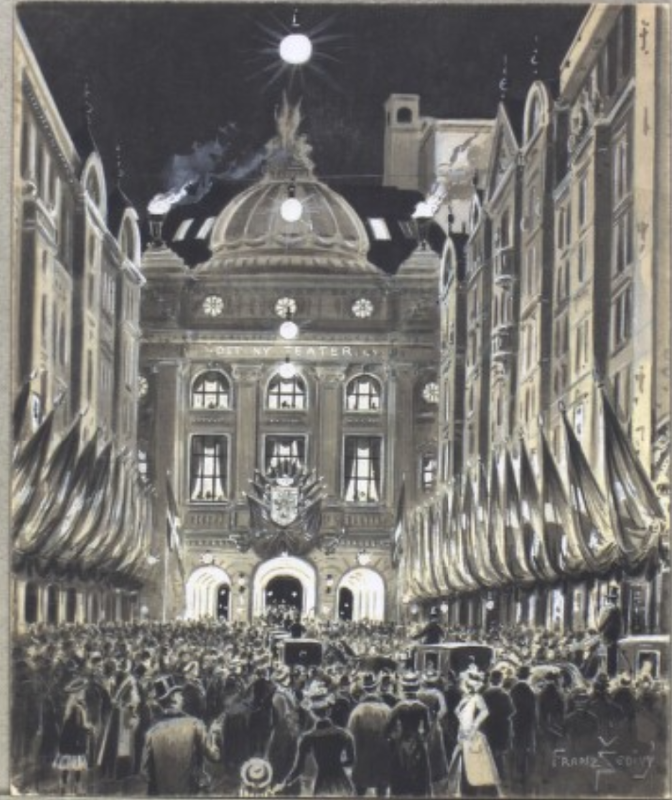
Franz Šedivý: The inauguration of the New Theatre on 10 September 1908

The site of the theatre, then a worn down apartment block, was in the spring of 1902 acquired by a development company, Bona, which had plans to build a large theatre and in the same time to open a passage between Gammel Kongevej and the new Vesterbro Passage, now part of Vesterbrogade, which was the backbone in a westward expansion of Copenhagen's city centre. Bona engaged Viggo Lindstrøm in the project as artistic consultant, he had been resident actor and director at Folketeatret but resigned after a fashionable controversy with its director, and in 1906 the company applied the Ministry of Justice for a license for the theatre's operation. The application was initially rejected by Peter Adler Alberti, the minister of Justice, supposedly due to a link with Folketeatret's director, but after personal intervention from King Frederik VIII, the license was finally granted.

In March 1907, Bona commissioned the architect Lorenz Gudme to draw up a project. He had previously worked for Ove Petersen, who was responsible for both the Royal Theatre, in collaboration with Vilhelm Dahlerup, and the Dagmar Theatre. His proposal was accepted and the fundaments were laid on 14 August 1907. Shortly after construction start, a disagreement occurred between Bona and Gudme who was ultimately fired from the project which was instead completed by Ludvig Andersen. When the theatre was inaugurated on 19 September 1908 it was the second largest theatre in the country and the construction price had been approx. DKK 1,200,000 and DKK 600,000 for the site.

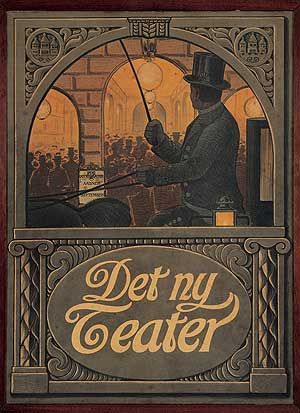
Poster from the opening in 1908

=== Opening and early years ===
Lindstrøm, who also was the theatre's first director, had declared himself willing to set up everything at his new theatre, the second largest in Copenhagen, but the opening performance, Pierre Berton's Den skønne Marseillanerinde, an extravaganza about Napoleon with a young cast featuring such later stars as Poul Reumert, Asta Nielsen and Clara Wieth, became exemplar of the repertoire during the first three decades.

Lindstrøm himself left the theatre after just three years due to an insignificant debts. He was succeeded in the post by the actor Ivar Schmidt (1869–1940) who held the post from 1911 to 1937, accompanied by actors such as Else-Marie, Berthe Qvistgaard, Ellen Gottschalch, Ib Schønberg and Osvald Helmuth.

=== Change of repertoire ===
The director from 1944 to 1966 was Peer Gregaard and he dramatically changed the repertoire from with a combination of classics and contemporary Danish and European drama. During this era, Det Ny Teater came to challenge the Royal Danish Theatre as the leading theatrical stage in Denmark.

=== Adversities and closure ===
In the 1960s it became evident that it was difficult to operate theatres without subsidies. The writer Knud Poulsen was appointed director in 1969 and by 1971 the theatre faced closure but was saved when the county and Ministry of Culture stepped in and compensated for reduced ticket prices.

This marked the beginning of a crisis for the theatre which reflected the general adversities for the industry and, in 1976, led to the introduction of a general regime for subsidizing theatrical productions. In 1991, when the theatre, by then in a poor state of neglect, lost its support, it had to close indefinitely.

=== Reopening and recent years ===
The owners succeeded in raising funds for a thorough renovation. Bent Mejding was the driving force behind the restoration of the theater, which he and Niels-Bo Valbro reopened as a venue for operetta and musicals with a production of Die Fledermaus in 1994. Since then the theatre has produced a number of large productions, the most successful of which, artistically and audience-wise, has been Phantom of the Opera, which ran from 2000 to 2002.

== Building ==
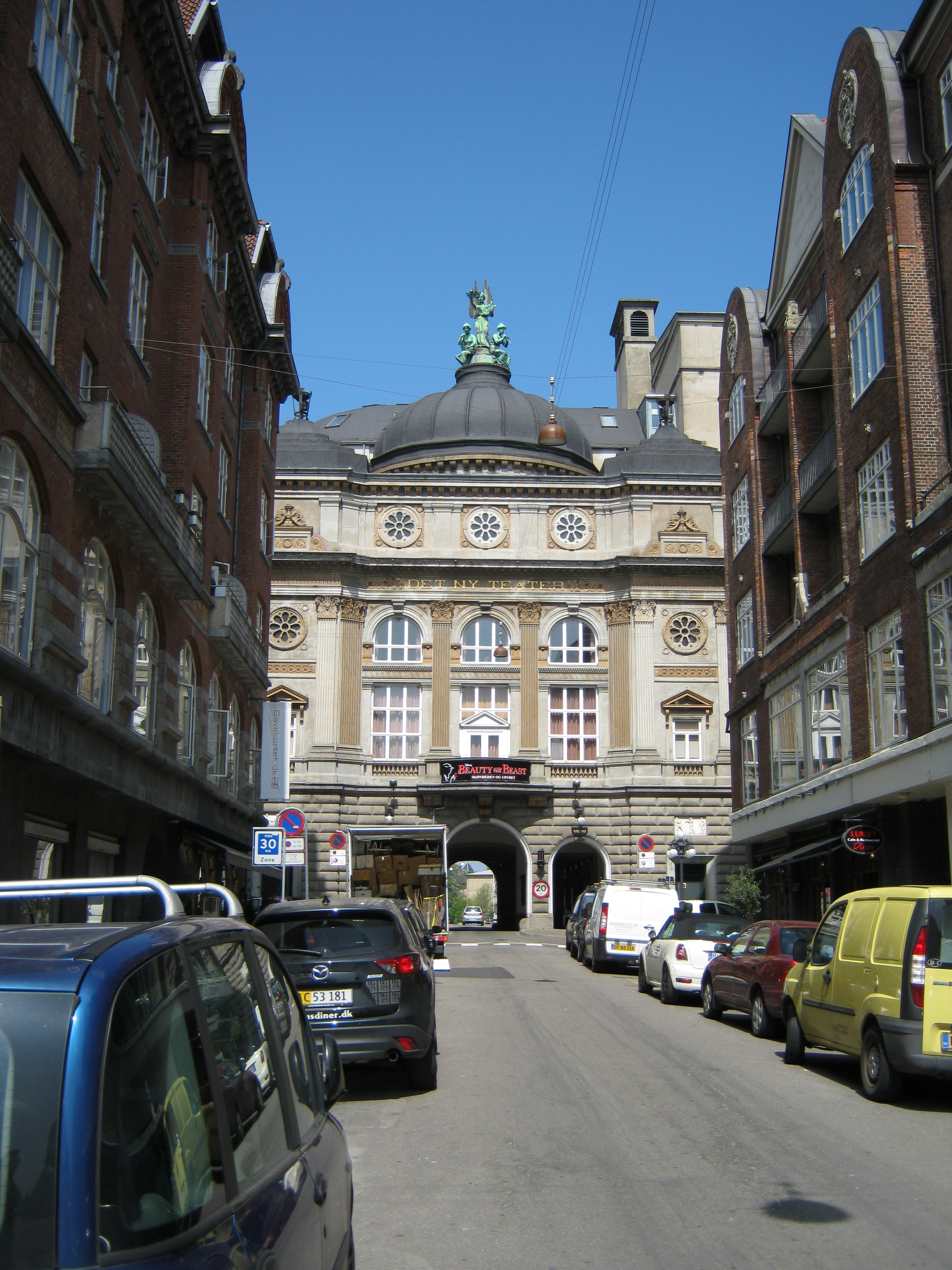
The façade from Vesterbrogade

The theatre building spans a passage between Vesterbrogade and Gammel Kongevej and has a facade front on both sides. The complex also includes the surrounding buildings.

The theatre is loosely modelled on the Paris Opera, but is built in a mixture of styles, combining elements such as classical trompe-l'œil effects and Greek capitals side by side with art deco features.

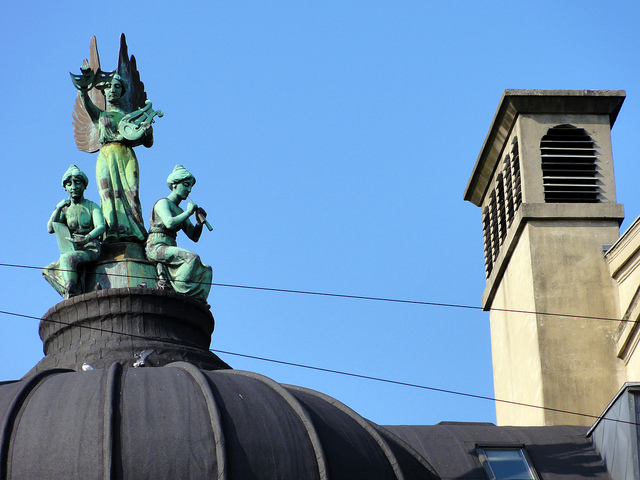
Roof-top sculpture group

Built in reinforced concrete, it was the first building in Denmark to use the Hennebique system, due to added strength, allowed the theatre to be the first in Denmark to have balconies without supporting pillars. The theatre was also the first in Denmark to feature a revolving stage. Other state-of-the-art features were an advanced sprinkler system in case of fire on stage, showers installed for the actors on every floor. For the audience there were comfortable family boxes, an elegant marble staircase and a large inviting foyer. The renovation in 1994 received the Europa Nostra award from the European Union.

== Det Ny Teater today ==
Since the renovation, the theatre has two stages. The large auditorium seats app. 1,000 while the small one, built in the cellar in connection with the 1994 renovation, seats an audience of 250 to 300. The main repertoire is still musicals.

The theatre plays also host to a variety of other events and is available on hire.

== See also ==
- Culture of Denmark
