= Carl Theodor Dreyer =

Danish film director (1889–1968)

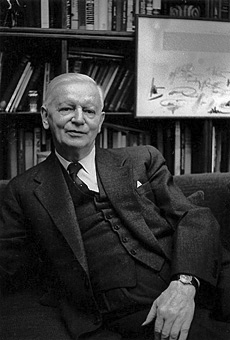
- Dreyer in 1965
- Born: 3 February 1889; Copenhagen, Denmark
- Died: 20 March 1968 (aged 79); Copenhagen, Denmark
- Occupations: Film director; screenwriter
- Years active: 1919–1968
- Spouse: Ebba Larsen (m. 1911)
- Children: 2
- Awards: Golden Lion at the 1955 Venice Film Festival for Ordet (The Word)

Carl Theodor Dreyer (Danish: [ˈkʰɑˀl ˈtsʰe̝ːotɒ ˈtʁɑjˀɐ]; 3 February 1889 – 20 March 1968), commonly known as Carl Th. Dreyer, was a Danish film director and screenwriter. Widely considered one of the greatest filmmakers in history, his movies are noted for emotional austerity and slow, stately pacing, frequent themes of social intolerance, the inseparability of fate and death, and the power of evil in earthly life.

His 1928 movie The Passion of Joan of Arc is considered to be one of the greatest of all time, renowned for its cinematography and use of close-ups. It frequently appears on Sight & Sound's lists of the greatest films ever made, and in 2012's poll, it was voted the ninth-best film by critics and 37th by directors.

His other well-known films include Michael (1924), Vampyr (1932), Day of Wrath (1943), Ordet (The Word) (1955), and Gertrud (1964).

== Life ==
Dreyer was born illegitimate in Copenhagen. His birth mother was an unmarried, Scanian maid named Josefine Bernhardine Nilsson, and he was put up for adoption by his birth father, Jens Christian Torp, a married Danish farmer living in Sweden who was his mother's employer. He spent the first two years of his life in orphanages until his adoption by a typographer named Carl Theodor Dreyer and his wife Inger Marie (née Olsen). He was named after his adoptive father, but in accordance with Danish practice, there is no Senior or Junior added to their names to distinguish them from each other.

His adoptive parents were emotionally distant, and his childhood was largely unhappy. He later recalled that his parents "constantly let me know that I should be grateful for the food I was given and that I strictly had no claim on anything since my mother got out of paying by lying down to die." He was a highly intelligent school student, who left home and formal education at the age of 16. He dissociated himself from his adoptive family, but their teachings influenced the themes of many of his films.

Dreyer was ideologically conservative. David Bordwell stated "As a youth he belonged to the Social Liberal party, a conservative group radical only in their opposition to military expenditures." Dreyer recalled "Even when I was with Ekstrabladet, I was conservative...I don't believe in revolutions. They have, as a rule, the tedious quality of pulling development back. I believe more in evolution, in the small advances."

Dreyer died of pneumonia in Copenhagen at age 79. The documentary Carl Th. Dreyer: My Metier contains reminiscences from people who knew him.

== Career ==
=== Early works ===
French poster for The Passion of Joan of Arc (1928)

As a young man, Dreyer worked as a journalist, and he eventually joined the film industry as a writer of title cards for silent films and subsequently of screenplays. He was initially hired by Nordisk Film in 1913.

His first attempts at film direction had limited success, and he left Denmark to work in the French film industry. While living in France he met Jean Cocteau, Jean Hugo, and other members of the French artistic scene.

In 1928 he made his first classic film, The Passion of Joan of Arc. Working from the transcripts of Joan of Arc's trial, he created a masterpiece of emotion that drew equally on realism and expressionism. Because the Danish film industry was in financial ruin, Dreyer depended on private financing from Baron Nicolas de Gunzburg to make his next film, Vampyr (1932), a surreal meditation on fear. However, both films were box office failures and Dreyer did not make another movie until World War II.

=== Later career ===
By 1943, Denmark was under Nazi occupation, and Dreyer's film Day of Wrath had as its theme the paranoia surrounding witch hunts in the seventeenth century in a strongly theocratic culture. With this work, Dreyer established the style that would mark his sound films: careful compositions, stark monochrome cinematography, and very long takes.

Dreyer made two documentaries in the more than a decade before his next full-length feature film, in 1955, Ordet (The Word), based on the play of the same name by Kaj Munk. The film combines a love story with a conflict of faith.

Dreyer's last film was 1964's Gertrud. Although seen by some as a lesser film than its predecessors, it is a fitting close to Dreyer's career as it deals with a woman who, through the tribulations of her life, never expresses regret for her choices. David Thomson says it "awaits rediscovery as Dreyer's finest film and vindication of his method." Thomson quotes Dreyer:

What interests me—and this comes before technique—is reproducing the feelings of the characters in my films...The important thing...is not only to catch hold of the words they say, but also the thoughts behind the words. What I seek in my films, what I want to obtain, is a penetration to my actors' profound thoughts by means of their most subtle expressions...that lie in the depths of his soul. This what interests me above all, not the technique of the cinema. Gertrud is a film I made with all my heart.

The great, never finished project of Dreyer's career was a film about Jesus. Although a manuscript was written (published in 1968), the unstable economic conditions and Dreyer's own perfectionism left the project undeveloped at his death.

== Filmography ==
=== Feature films ===
| Year | English title | Original title | Production country | Notes |
|---|---|---|---|---|
| 1919 | The President | Præsidenten | Denmark | based on the novel by Karl Emil Franzos |
| 1920 | The Parson's Widow | Prästänkan | Sweden | based on the story "Prestekonen" by Kristofer Janson |
| 1921 | Leaves from Satan's Book | Blade af Satans bog | Denmark | loosely based on The Sorrows of Satan |
| 1922 | Love One Another | Die Gezeichneten | Germany | based on the novel by Aage Madelung |
| 1922 | Once Upon a Time | Der var engang | Denmark | based on the play by Holger Drachmann |
| 1924 | Michael | Mikaël | Germany | based on the novel Mikaël (1904) by Herman Bang |
| 1925 | Master of the House (aka Thou Shalt Honor Thy Wife) | Du skal ære din hustru | Denmark | based on the play by Svend Rindom |
| 1926 | The Bride of Glomdal | Glomdalsbruden | Norway | based on the novel by Jacob Breda Bull |
| 1928 | The Passion of Joan of Arc | La Passion de Jeanne d'Arc (Jeanne d'Arc lidelse og død) | France | co-written with Joseph Delteil, author of the novel Jeanne d'Arc (1925, Prix Femina), named the most influential film of all time by the curators of the 2010 Toronto International Film Festival |
| 1932 | Vampyr | Vampyr – Der Traum des Allan Grey | France/Germany | loosely based on the short story collection In a Glass Darkly (1872) by J. Sheridan Le Fanu |
| 1943 | Day of Wrath | Vredens Dag | Denmark | based on the play Anne Pedersdotter by Hans Wiers-Jenssen, hymns by Paul La Cour |
| 1945 | Two People | Två människor | Sweden | based on the play Attentat by W.O. Somin, made in Nazi-related exile in Sweden, the film was disowned by Dreyer and withdrawn from distribution |
| 1955 | The Word | Ordet | Denmark | based on the play by Kaj Munk |
| 1964 | Gertrud | Gertrud | Denmark | based on the play by Hjalmar Söderberg |

=== Short films ===
- Good Mothers (Mødrehjælpen, 12 min, 1942)
- Water from the Land (Vandet på landet, 14 min, 1946)
- The Struggle Against Cancer (Kampen mod kræften, 15 min, 1947)
- The Danish Village Church (Landsbykirken, 14 min, 1947)
- They Caught the Ferry (De nåede færgen, 11 min, 1948)
- Thorvaldsen (10 min, 1949)
- The Storstrom Bridge (Storstrømsbroen, 7 min, 1950)
- The Castle Within the Castle (Et Slot i et slot, 9 min, 1955)
