= List of Danish films of the 1910s =

The following table is a list of films produced in Denmark or in the Danish language in the 1910s. For an alphabetical list of all Danish films currently on Wikipedia see Category:Danish films. For Danish films from other decades see the Cinema of Denmark box above.

Danish Title	English Title	Director(s)	Cast	Genre	Notes
1910
Afgrunden	The Abyss	Urban Gad	Asta Nielsen	Drama	
Dorian Grays Portræt	The Picture of Dorian Gray		Henrik Malberg	Drama	
Den hvide slavehandel	The White Slave Trade	August Blom		Drama	
Den skæbnesvangre opfindelse	Dr. Jekyll and Mr. Hyde	August Blom	Alwin Neuß	Horror	
1911
Mormonens Offer	A Victim of the Mormons	August Blom	Clara Pontoppidan, Valdemar Psilander	Melodrama	first anti-Mormon propaganda film
1913
Atlantis	Atlantis	August Blom	Olaf Fønss, Ida Orloff, Ebba Thomsen, Carl Lauritzen, Frederik Jacobsen, Charles Unthan, Torben Meyer	Romance Drama	First full length Danish film. The script was entirely based on the 1912 novel by Gerhart Hauptmann, published one month before the Titanic disaster. Nevertheless, the film was banned in Norway, being deemed improper to turn a tragedy into entertainment.
En Gartnerdreng søges					
Skyggedanserinden					
Lille Claus og Store Claus		Henrik Malberg			
1914
Stærkere end Dynamit					
Ned med Vaabnene	Lay down your arms!	Holger-Madsen	Philip Bech, Augusta Blad, Johanne Fritz-Petersen, Alf Blütecher	Drama	
1916
Verdens Undergang	The End of the World	August Blom	Olaf Fønss, Ebba Thomsen	Science fiction	
Hævnens nat	Blind Justice	Benjamin Christensen	Benjamin Christensen	Crime, Drama, Mystery	
1919
Præsidenten		Carl Theodor Dreyer	Richard Christensen, Christian Engelstoft, Hallander Helleman, Halvard Hoff, Jon Iversen, Jacoba Jessen, Betty Kirkeby, Axel Madsen, Carl Walther Meyer, Peter Nielsen, Fanny Petersen, Elith Pio, Olga Raphael-Linden	Drama Romance	An adaptation of the 1884 novel Der Präsident by Karl Emil Franzos
