= 1910 in film =

The year 1910 in film involved some significant events.

== Events ==
- March 10 – Release of In Old California, the first film made in Hollywood, California, directed by D. W. Griffith.
- March 12 – American actress Florence Lawrence becomes "the first true movie star" after movie mogul Carl Laemmle of Independent Moving Pictures (I.M.P.) names her in advertisements announcing that he has signed the leading lady who has hitherto only been billed as "The Biograph Girl" by Biograph Studios. Until now, studios had a policy of not releasing the names of their players, and prohibiting distributors from revealing the information. Lawrence's first I.M.P. release is The Broken Oath.
- March 18 – The first cinematic version of Mary Shelley's Frankenstein (1818) is released in the United States by Edison Studios. One of the first horror films, it features (unbilled) actor Charles Ogle as the monster.
- May 6 – Newsreel footage of the funeral of Edward VII in London is shot in Kinemacolor, making it the first color newsreel.
- July – The Johnson-Jeffries Fight footage causes race riots and is banned in the South of the US.
- August 2 – A Danish melodrama, The White Slave Trade (Den Hvide Slavehandel), marks the first time film is used to study prostitution.
- August – Kalem Studios director Sidney Olcott becomes the first American to make a motion picture outside of the United States, The Lad from Old Ireland (released November 23).
- Pathé News is formed in London, producing newsreels and documentaries in the UK until 1970.
- Marcus Loew partners with Adolph Zukor, Joseph Schenck and Nicholas Schenck renaming his theatre chain Loew's Consolidated Enterprises.

== Films by country ==
- Australia
- Austria
- Brazil
- Denmark
- France
- Germany
- Italy
- Japan
- Mexico
- Russia
- Sweden
- United Kingdom
- United States

== Notable films ==
Films produced in the United States unless stated otherwise

=== A ===
- The Abyss (Afgrunden), drama directed by Urban Gad, starring Asta Nielsen – (Denmark)
- Alice's Adventures in Wonderland, fantasy directed by Edwin S. Porter for the Edison Manufacturing Company; based on the 1865 novel by Lewis Carroll
- An Arcadian Maid, drama directed by D. W. Griffith for the Biograph Company, starring Mary Pickford
- As It Is in Life, drama directed by D. W. Griffith for the Biograph Company, starring Mary Pickford

=== C ===
- A Christmas Carol, drama directed by J. Searle Dawley for the Edison Manufacturing Company; based on the 1843 novella by Charles Dickens

=== F ===
- Frankenstein, horror directed by J. Searle Dawley for the Edison Manufacturing Company, starring Charles Stanton Ogle; based on the 1818 novel by Mary Shelley
- The Fugitive, drama directed by D. W. Griffith for the Biograph Company

=== H ===
- The House with Closed Shutters, drama directed by D. W. Griffith for the Biograph Company, starring Henry B. Walthall

=== I ===
- In Old California, western directed by D. W. Griffith for the Biograph Company, starring Frank Powell

=== J ===
- Jeffries–Johnson World's Championship Boxing Contest, produced by J. Stuart Blackton

=== L ===
- A Lad from Old Ireland, drama directed by Sidney Olcott for the Kalem Company

=== M ===
- Marvellous Melbourne, documentary directed by Cosens Spencer for West's Pictures – (Australia)

=== R ===
- Ramona, drama directed by D. W. Griffith for the Biograph Company, starring Mary Pickford and Henry B. Walthall; based on the 1884 novel by Helen Hunt Jackson

=== T ===
- Thunderbolt (incomplete), drama directed by John Gavin for West's Pictures – (Australia)
- Twelfth Night, romantic comedy directed by Eugene Mullin and Charles Kent for the Vitagraph Company, starring Florence Turner; based on the 17th-century play by William Shakespeare

=== W ===
- White Fawn's Devotion, drama directed by James Young Deer for Pathé-Frères
- The White Slave Trade (Den hvide slavehandel), drama directed by August Blom for Nordisk Film – (Denmark)
- The Wonderful Wizard of Oz, fantasy directed by Otis Turner for the Selig Polyscope Company; based on the 1900 novel by L. Frank Baum

== Births ==
- January 3 – John Sturges, American film director (died 1992)
- January 12
  - Patsy Kelly, American actress (died 1981)
  - Luise Rainer, German-born film actress (died 2014)
- January 28 – John Banner, Austrian-American actor (died 1973)
- February 2 – David Sharpe, American actor and stunt performer (died 1980)
- February 8
  - Steffi Duna, Hungarian-born film actress (died 1992)
  - Marc Lawrence, American character actor (died 2005)
- February 10 – Joyce Grenfell, English diseuse, singer, actress and writer (died 1979)
- February 17 – Arthur Hunnicutt, American actor (died 1979)
- February 21 – Paul Bryar, American actor (died 1985)
- February 27
  - Joan Bennett, American actress (died 1990)
  - Wolfgang Preiss, German actor (died 2002)
- March 1 – David Niven, English actor, soldier, raconteur, memoirist and novelist (died 1983)
- March 5 – Sheila Terry, American film actress (died 1957)
- March 8 – Claire Trevor, American actress (died 2000)
- March 17
  - Frank de Kova, American character actor (died 1981)
  - Sari Maritza, British film actress (died 1987)
  - Patrick McVey, American actor (died 1973)
- March 22 – Herbert Rudley, American character actor (died 2006)
- March 23 – Akira Kurosawa, Japanese filmmaker (died 1998)
- March 24 – Richard Conte, American actor (died 1975)
- April 23 – Simone Simon, French film actress (died 2005)
- May 4 – James Ellison, American film actor (died 1993)
- May 11 – Johnnie Davis, American actor, singer and trumpeter (died 1983)
- May 14 – Richard Rober, American actor (died 1952)
- May 15 – Constance Cummings, American-British actress (died 2005)
- May 23 – Scatman Crothers, American actor and musician (died 1986)
- June 3 – Paulette Goddard, American actress and socialite (died 1990)
- June 7 – Arthur Gardner, American actor and film producer (died 2014)
- June 9 – Robert Cummings, American actor (died 1990)
- June 13 – Mary Wickes, American character actress (died 1995)
- June 16 – Ilona Massey, Hungarian-American actress (died 1974)
- June 24 – Martha Sleeper, American actress (died 1983)
- July 4 – Gloria Stuart, American actress, visual artist and activist (died 2010)
- July 11 – Sally Blane, American actress (died 1997)
- July 15 – Ken Lynch, American actor (died 1990)
- July 27 – Lupita Tovar, Mexican-American actress (died 2016)
- July 28 – Bill Goodwin, American radio announcer and actor (died 1958)
- August 4 – Anita Page, American actress (died 2008)
- August 6 – Charles Crichton, English film director and editor (died 1999)
- August 8 – Sylvia Sidney, American actress (died 1999)
- August 12 – Jane Wyatt, American actress (died 2006)
- August 16 – Mae Clarke, American actress (died 1992)
- August 18 – Emile Meyer, American actor (died 1987)
- August 22 – Lucille Ricksen, American actress (died 1925)
- August 30 – Donald Bisset, English actor (died 1995)
- September 9 – Kitty Carlisle, American actress, opera singer, television personality and spokesperson (died 2007)
- September 19 – Margaret Lindsay, American film actress (died 1981)
- September 29 – Virginia Bruce, American actress and singer (died 1982)
- October 8 – Paulette Dubost, French actress (died 2011)
- October 23 – Hayden Rorke, American actor (died 1987)
- October 27 – Jack Carson, Canadian-American actor (died 1963)
- November 26 – Cyril Cusack, Irish actor (died 1993)
- December 4 – Alex North, American composer (died 1991)
- December 7
  - Rod Cameron, Canadian actor (died 1983)
  - Louis Prima, American trumpeter, singer, entertainer, and bandleader (died 1978)
- December 13 – Lillian Roth, American singer and actress (died 1980)
- December 26 – Marguerite Churchill, American actress (died 2000)
- December 31 – Roy Rowland, American film director (died 1995)

== Deaths ==
Day	Name	Profession	Year of birth
April 21	Mark Twain	Humourist, writer, born Samuel L. Clemons.	1835
November 20	Leo Tolstoy	Russian novelist	1828

== Debuts ==
- Leah Baird – Jean and the Waif
- Carlyle Blackwell – Uncle Tom's Cabin (short)
- Eleanor Caines – The New Boss of Bar X Ranch (short)
- Grace Cunard – The Duke's Plan (short)
- Margarita Fischer – There, Little Girl, Don't Cry (short)
- Helen Gardner – How She Won Him (short)
- Hoot Gibson – Pride of the Range
- Alice Joyce – The Deacon's Daughter (short)
- J. Warren Kerrigan – A Voice from the Fireplace (short)
- Mae Marsh – Ramona (short)
- Asta Nielsen – The Woman Always Pays (short)
- Mabel Normand – Indiscretions of Betty
- Wallace Reid – The Phoenix (short)
- Marin Sais – Twelfth Night (short)
- Norma Talmadge – The Household Pest
- Pearl White – The Missing Bridegroom (short)
