= Johan Ankerstjerne =

Danish cinematographer

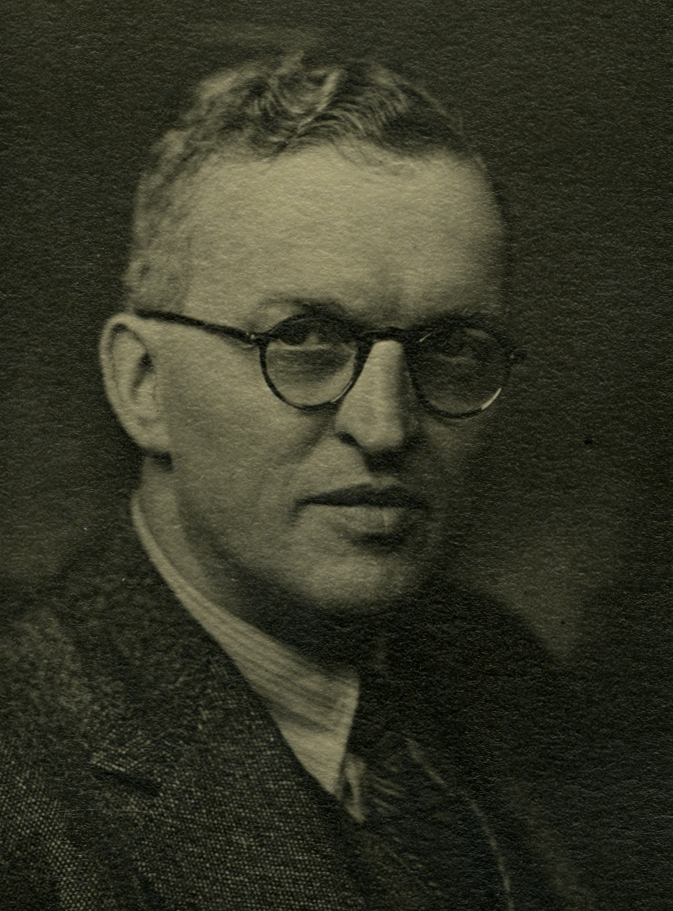
- Born: 17 January 1886
- Died: 18 August 1959 (aged 73)
- Occupation: cinematographer
- Years active: 1911–1925
- Known for: head of cinematography at Nordisk Film
- Notable work: see Filmography

Johan Valdemar Ankerstjerne (17 January 1886 – 18 August 1959) was a Danish cinematographer who for many years was head of cinematography at Nordisk Film. He was reportedly the best cameraman in Denmark in the 1910s, making many films for August Blom from 1911 until 1916 and then for Benjamin Christensen. He created the unique "images of Haxan". In 1932 he founded Denmark's first film laboratory, Johan Ankerstjerne A/S which, after merging with Nordisk Film Teknik, became the largest production facility in the country.

== Career ==
Ankerstjerne first became a watchmaker in Randers. In 1907, he also became an operator in the town's first cinema. It was not long before he decided to make films himself, starting with short documentaries. When Nordisk Film expanded in early 1911, he was put on probation as a photographer but was quickly given a job in feature films. By the end of the year, August Blom had appointed him leading photographer. He soon became Blom's favorite photographer, handling the camera work on the highly successful Atlantis (1913).

In 1915 he left Nordisk Film to become a cameraman for Benjamin Christensen who was directing Hævnens Nat (Blind Justice) which was completed in 1916. With this film his status rose to a level of a highly acclaimed cameraman. He was one of the first Cameraman in Europe who adopted the three point lighting system then common in the US. He adopted this innovative technique effectively for closeup shots using arc lighting from “a three quarters back position". The prevalent practice in Europe then was not to use back lighting while using spotlights.

He then worked for the newly founded film company Dansk Film Co., later known as Dansk Astra Film, until 1921 when he was again engaged by Christensen to work on the Swedish/Danish film Häxan (1922). After joining Guðmundur Kamban to shoot Hadda Padda in Iceland, he was employed by the technical department of Nordisk Film until 1931.

The following year, in 1932, Ankerstjerne launched his own business, Johan Ankerstjerne A/S, which became the leading Film Laboratory in Denmark for 16 mm and 35 mm films. It is now under the ownership of Nordish Films Kompagni.

He remained with this establishment until his death in 1959. The firm soon became Scandinavia's largest film copying company.

== Filmography ==
Ankerstjerne was cinematographer for the following feature films:

- Det mørke Punkt (1911)
- Livets Løgn (1911)
- Hjærternes Kamp (1912)
- Historien om en Moder (1912)
- Et Hjerte af Guld (1912)
- Den sorte Kansler (1912)
- Guvernørens Datter (1912)
- En Hofintrige (1913)
- Højt Spil (1913)
- Troløs (1913)
- Pressens Magt (1913)
- Sladder (1913)
- Hvem var Forbryderen? (1913)
- Flugten gennem Luften (1913)
- Djævelens Datter (1913)
- Den tredie Magt (1913)
- Atlantis (1913)
- Bristet Lykke (1913)
- Et Læreaar (1914)
- Det gamle Fyrtaarn (1914)
- Eventyrersken (1914)
- Fædrenes Synd (1914)
- Vasens Hemmelighed (1914)
- Tugthusfange No. 97 (1914)
- Skyldig? - ikke skyldig? (1914)
- Elskovsleg (1914)
- Af Elskovs Naade (1914)
- Revolutionsbryllup (1915)
- Addys Ægteskab (1916)
- Viljeløs Kærlighed (1916)
- Gentlemansekretæren (1916 )
- Syndig Kærlighed (1916)
- Lotteriseddel No. 22152 (1916)
- Du skal elske din Næste (1916)
- Den største Kærlighed (1916)
- Sønnen (1916)
- Sønnen (1916)
- Syndens Datter (1916)
- Pro Patria (1916)
- Hævnens Nat or Blind Justice (1916)
- Mens Juleklokkerne ringer (1917)
- En ensom Kvinde (1917)
- Telefondamen (1917)
- Pigen fra Palls (1917)
- Gengældelsens Ret (1917)
- For sit Lands Ære (1918)
- Fangen fra Erie Country Tugthus (1918)
- Hævneren (1918)
- Dommens Dag (1918)
- Lægen (1918)
- Du skal ære - (1918)
- Et nydeligt Trekløver (1919)
- Bajadser (1919)
- Gillekop (1919)
- En Aftenscene (1920)
- Dømmer ikke (1920)
- Lykkeper (1920)
- Hendes Fortid (1921)
- Munkens Fristelser (1921)
- Pan (1922)
- Timeglasset (1922)
- Heksen (1922)
- Republikaneren (1923)
- Hadda Padda (1924)
- Det store Hjerte or Side-lights of the Sawdust Ring (1925)
