= List of Brazilian films before 1920 =

An incomplete list of the earliest films produced in Brazil between 1908 and 1919. For an A-Z list of films currently on Wikipedia, see Category:Brazilian films

== 1897-1909 ==
Title	Director	Cast	Genre	Notes	
1897
Ancoradouro de Pescadores na Baía de Guanabara					
Uma Artista Trabalhando no Trapézio do Politeama					
Bailado de Crianças no Colégio, no Andaraí					
Chegada do Trem em Petrópolis					
1908
A Mala Sinistra	Antônio Leal				
Duelo de Cozinheiras					
Os Capadócios da Cidade Nova					
O Comprador de Ratos					
Os Estranguladores					
Os Guaranis					
1909
Aventuras de Zé Caipora					
O Fósforo Eleitoral	Antônio Serra				February 11
O Nono Mandamento				February 25	
Noivado de Sangue	Antônio Serra	Mendonça Balsemão, Romeu Bastos, Helena Cavallier	Drama	March 4	
Nas Entranhas do Morro do Castelo				March 18	
Um Cavalheiro Deveras Obsequioso				March 30	
Um Drama na Tijuca				April 1	
Os Milagres de Santo Antônio				April 8	
Às Portas do Céu				April 19	
Os Dois Proscritos ou a Restauração de Portugal em 1640					
Pela Vitória dos Clubes Carnavalescos	Antônio Serra	Antônio Serra, Helena Cavallier, Julieta Pinto	Comedy		
Pega na Chaleira	Joseph Arnaud	Aurélia Delorme, Helena Cavallier, Domingos Braga	History		
A Cabana do Pai Tomás				May 11	
João José				June 26	
A Viúva Alegre				July 22	
Dona Inez de Castro				August 9	
Remorso Vivo					
Aventuras de Zé Caipora				September 2	
A Gueixa				November 8	
Sonho de Valsa				December 23	
Zé Bolas e o Famoso Telegrama Número Nove					

== 1910s ==
Title	Director	Cast	Genre	Notes
1910
Triste Fim de Uma Vida de Prazeres				
Mil Adultérios				
606 contra o Espirocheta Palido				
Paz e Amor				
1911
O Conde de Luxemburgo				April 24
A Dançarina Descalça				June 1
1912
A Vida do Barão do Rio Branco				May 13
Mil e 400 contos				September 11
O Guarani				October 6
1913
O Crime de Paula Matos				
A Mulher do Chiqueiro				October 17
1914
Amor de Perdição (1914 film)				
O Crime dos Banhados				
1915
A Moreninha				
Inocência				
Les Enfants d'Édouard				April 29
Uma Transformista Original				October 29
1916
O Guaraní				June 5
Perdida				October 16
Lucíola				December 11
Vivo ou Morto				December 14
1917
Dioguinho				
O Cruzeiro do Sul				
Entre Dois Amores				
Iracema				
Pátria Brasileira				
O Grito do Ipiranga				
Heróis Brasileiros na Guerra do Paraguai				
1918
Amor de Perdição (1918 film)				
Amor e Boemia				
A Apoteose do Carnaval de 1914				
Zero-Treze				
1919
Alma Sertaneja				
Ubirajara				
A Caipirinha				
