= Merritt B. Gerstad =

American cinematographer (1900–1974)

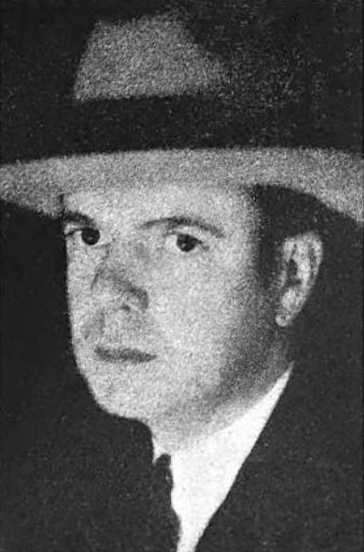

Merritt Brindley Edward Gerstad (July 5, 1900 – March 1, 1974) was an American cinematographer of silent and early sound films.

== Career ==
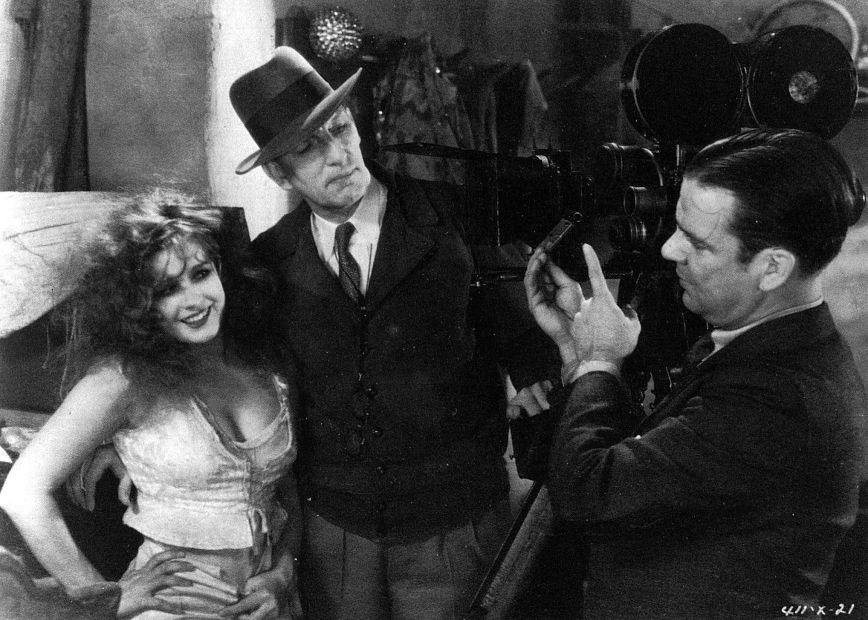
Lili Damita, Charles Brabin, and Merritt B. Gerstad on the set of The Bridge of San Luis Rey (1929)

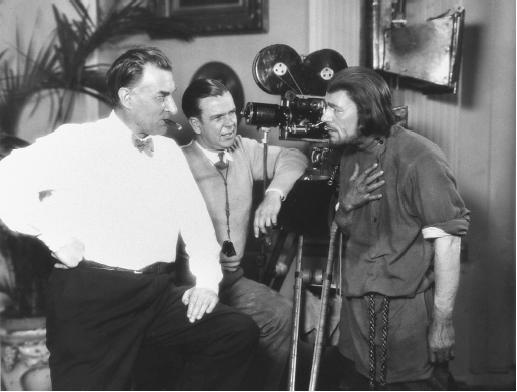
L-R: Benjamin Christensen, Merritt B. Gerstad and Lon Chaney on set of Mockery (1927)

Merritt B. Gerstad was born in Chicago on July 5, 1900.

After beginning as a cinematographer on films for Universal, he worked for MGM, working with director Tod Browning on (the lost) London After Midnight (1927) and Freaks (1932), and Sam Wood on the Marx Brothers A Night at the Opera (1935). Later he was at Warner Bros. for Watch on the Rhine (1943) starring Bette Davis, Conflict (1945) with Humphrey Bogart in the lead, and the Gershwin biopic Rhapsody in Blue (1945), his last credit.

He died in Orange County, California on March 1, 1974, and was buried at Forest Lawn Memorial Park in Glendale.

== Partial filmography ==
- The Poor Simp (1920)
- Under Oath (1922)
- The Man from Wyoming (1924)
- High Speed (1924)
- Tessie (1925)
- The Road to Mandalay (1926)
- The Ice Flood (1926)
- The Unknown (1927)
- Mockery (1927)
- London After Midnight (1927)
- Circus Rookies (1928)
- Forbidden Hours (1928)
- The Bridge of San Luis Rey (1929)
- The Thirteenth Chair (1929)
- Devil-May-Care (1929)
- Our Blushing Brides (1930)
- Call of the Flesh (1930)
- West of Broadway (1931)
- Freaks (1932)
- Night World (1932)
- Payment Deferred (1932)
- Goldie Gets Along (1933)
- Only Yesterday (1933)
- Imitation of Life (1934)
- A Night at the Opera (1935)
- One Rainy Afternoon (1936)
- Girls' Dormitory (1936)
- The Magnificent Brute (1936)
- The Luckiest Girl in the World (1936)
- Seventh Heaven (1937)
- Eternally Yours (1939)
- Slightly Honorable (1939)
- Tom, Dick and Harry (1941)
- Conflict (1945)
- Rhapsody in Blue (1945)
