= Thorleif Lund =

Norwegian actor (1880–1956)

- Born: Torleif Brinck Lund; 7 June 1880; Stavanger, Norway
- Died: 30 June 1956 (aged 76); Copenhagen, Denmark
- Occupations: Stage and film actor
- Spouse: Ebba Thomsen
- Writing career
- Period: Silent film era

Thorleif Brinck Lund (7 June 1880 – 30 June 1956) was a Norwegian stage and film actor of the silent film era.

== Early life ==
Thorleif Lund was born in Stavanger, Norway to parents Hans Geelmuyden Lund and Bertella Karen Lauritza Bertelsen in 1880.

Thorlief Lund made his stage debut as an actor at the Nationaltheatret (The National Theater) in Oslo in 1905. He also appeared at the Centraltheatret (Central Theater) in Oslo, and then on Den Nationale Scene theater in Bergen from 1908 to 1913. In 1914, Lund made his film debut in the Scandinavian-Russian Handelshus in Copenhagen, Denmark where he participated in several films before he left the same year to sign a contract with Nordisk Film where he spent the next three years playing in some 35 films. In September 1917, the forced deteriorating economic conditions caused by World War I caused Nordisk Film to terminate their contracts with some 50 actors; including Thorleif Lund.

== Later career ==
After several years, Lund went with his actress wife Ebba Thomsen and several other former Nordisk Film actors: Philip Bech, Alma Hinding and Birger von Cotta-Schønberg on a theater tour on Norway and Sweden, but without great success. In 1923 he appeared in his last film Republikanere (Republicans), directed by Olaf Fønss for Astra Film. After the retiring from the film industry, he worked as a businessman, particularly as an advertising manager at Magasin du Nord. In his last years he worked as a factory director for a company that manufactured gloves.

== Personal life ==
Thorleif Lund was married twice, first on 7 October 1908 to Janne Lange Kielland Holm which ended in divorce. His second marriage was to Danish actress Ebba Thomsen in 1915. Lund died on 30 June 1956 at age 76 and is buried at Gentofte Cemetery in Copenhagen County, Denmark.

== Selected filmography ==
- The End of the World (1916)
- The Secret of the Desert (1918)
