= Journey into the Night =

1921 film

- Poster
- Directed by: F. W. Murnau
- Written by: Harriet Bloch; Carl Mayer
- Produced by: Sascha Goron
- Starring: Olaf Fønss
- Cinematography: Max Lutze
- Release date: 21 January 1921
- Running time: 69 minutes
- Country: Weimar Republic
- Languages: Silent; German intertitles

Journey into the Night (German: Der Gang in die Nacht) is a 1921 silent German drama film directed by F. W. Murnau. Prints of the film still survive, thus making it the earliest surviving F. W. Murnau film.

== Plot ==
Journey into the Night (1921)

An upright, straight-laced physician, Dr. Eigil Börne (Olaf Fønss), has long been engaged to Hélène (Erna Morena). To celebrate Hélène's birthday, the couple goes to a cabaret. A dancer, Lily (Gudrun Bruun-Stefenssen), is fascinated by the doctor and pretends to sprain her ankle. Börne attends her, and she seduces him. Börne becomes infatuated, breaks his engagement to Hélène, and marries Lily.

The Börnes move to the country, where they meet a blind painter (Conrad Veidt). Dr. Börne restores his sight. Dr. Börne learns that Hélène's health is failing, as she is heartbroken over her broken engagement. He tries to see her, but is turned away. When he returns home, Dr. Börne discovers Lily is having an affair with the painter and abandons her.

Years later, Lily seeks out Dr. Börne. The painter has gone blind again, and she pleads with him to operate once more. Dr. Börne refuses. Lily, he says, is incapable of true love and doesn't really love the painter. At any rate, he would not operate unless Lily left the painter. Lily runs off. A short time later, Dr. Börne goes to see Lily and discovers she has poisoned herself so that Börne will operate on her lover. The painter declines treatment. Börne commits suicide as well, preferring to live in darkness rather than without Lily.

== Cast ==
- Olaf Fønss as Dr. Eigil Börne
- Erna Morena as Hélène
- Conrad Veidt as Der Maler (The Painter)
- Gudrun Bruun-Stefenssen as Lily

== See also ==
- List of German films of 1921
