= A Debt of Honour =

A Debt of Honour may refer to:

- A Debt of Honour (1921 film), German
- A Debt of Honour (1922 film), British
- "A Debt of Honour" (Signora Volpe), a 2024 television episode

== See also ==
- Debt of Honour, a 1936 British drama film
- Debt of Honor, a 1994 novel by Tom Clancy
