= The Mysterious X =

1914 film

- Directed by: Benjamin Christensen
- Written by: Benjamin Christensen
- Starring: Benjamin Christensen
- Cinematography: Emil Dinesen
- Release date: 23 March 1914
- Running time: 84 minutes
- Country: Denmark
- Language: Silent

The Mysterious X (Danish: Det hemmelighedsfulde X) is a 1914 Danish silent drama film directed by Benjamin Christensen. It was Christensen's directorial debut. Prints of the film exist in the Det Danske Filminstitut and the Museum of Modern Art.

== Cast ==
- Benjamin Christensen as Løjtnant van Hauen
- Karen Caspersen as Fru van Hauen
- Otto Reinwald as the oldest son
- Fritz Lamprecht as Kontreadmiral van Hauen
- Amanda Lund as Gamle Jane, barnepige
- Hermann Spiro as Grev Spinelli
- Bjørn Spiro as Johnny, the youngest son
