= Atlantis (1913 film) =

1913 film

- 1913 film poster by Aage Lund
- Directed by: August Blom
- Written by: Karl Ludwig Schröder; Axel Garde; Gerhart Hauptmann (book)
- Starring: Olaf Fønss; Ida Orloff
- Cinematography: Johan Ankerstjerne
- Edited by: August Blom
- Distributed by: Nordisk Film Kompagni
- Release date: 26 December 1913
- Running time: 113 minutes
- Country: Denmark
- Languages: silent film Danish intertitles

Atlantis is a 1913 Danish silent film directed by August Blom, the head of production at the Nordisk Film company, and was based upon the 1912 novel by Gerhart Hauptmann. It starred an international cast headlined by Danish matinée actor Olaf Fønss and Austrian stage actress Ida Orloff. The film tells the tale of a doctor who travels to the United States in search of a cure for his ailing wife and of the tragic sinking of an ocean liner after it strikes an object at sea. Released only one year after the sinking of the RMS Titanic, the film drew considerable attention as well as criticism due to similarities to the actual tragedy.

The high production costs for Atlantis were not equaled by box office returns at that time. However, the film went on to become the most watched film for Nordisk Film and has been hailed by film historian Erik Ulrichsen as a Danish masterpiece and "one of the first modern films."

== Plot ==
Dr. Friedrich von Kammacher (Olaf Fønss), a surgeon, is devastated after his wife develops a brain disorder and is institutionalized. On the advice of his parents, von Kammacher leaves Denmark to gain some respite from his wife's illness. Von Kammacher travels to Berlin, where he meets a young dancer named Ingigerd Hahlstrom (Ida Orloff) and the doctor becomes fond of her and very interested in her. However she has a large number of admirers and thus Von Kammacher gives up on her. However, while in Paris he sees an advertisement in the paper that she is going to New York with her father and decides to follow her. Von Kammacher buys a first class ticket on the same liner as Ingigerd, the SS Roland.

Aboard the ship, von Kammacher learns Ingigerd has a boyfriend with her and thus he backs down. Shortly after, he is called to treat a young Russian-Jewish woman with seasickness and they nearly get romantically involved but class stops this from happening.

Halfway across the sea the Roland strikes an unseen object which causes massive flooding and dooms the ship. The passengers panic as the ship sinks into the Atlantic. Von Kammacher finds Ingigerd passed out in her cabin from shock and carries her to a lifeboat. He goes back and searches in vain for her father but when he can't find him, von Kammacher returns to the lifeboat and holds Ingigerds hand as the lifeboat pulls away. The liner sinks so rapidly that many of the lifeboats are never launched and several passengers are swept into the sea and drowned. By morning, von Kammacher's lifeboat is still floating and ten souls still alive. They are spotted by a cargo liner Hjortholm and saved.

Survivors arrive in New York, von Kammacher tries to tell her that he loves her and wants a life with her in New York but she refuses to be tied down by one man. He gives up on her and they go their separate ways. Von Kammacher is impressed by an art gallery and takes an interest in fine art. Through the artistic community, he is introduced to a kind and pleasant sculptor Miss Eva Burns, and they develop a friendship. Dr. Schmidt, who is a friend of von Kammacher, offers him the use of a mountain cabin near Handon, where it is hoped that Friedrich will find some peace and solace. While he is in the mountains, a telegram from Denmark arrives with information that von Kammacher's wife has died. Upon hearing the news, Friedrich falls critically ill. Eva takes it upon herself to tend to him in the mountain cabin. As she nurses him back to health, their relationship blossoms. Happiness returns to Friedrich's life as he realizes Eva will be a good mother for his children.

== Production ==
Due to the large number of cast, extras, and locations, and the amount of equipment, Blom took the unusual step of employing two assistant directors for filming. The first was Robert Dinesen who later had his own successful career as a director with Nordisk Film in Denmark and Germany. The second assistant was the young Hungarian director Mihály Kertész, who under the name Michael Curtiz became one of the most well-known Hollywood directors through films such as Casablanca and White Christmas. Curtiz also appeared in Atlantis in a small supporting role.

To film the shipboard scenes, Nordisk Film chartered the Danish ocean liner C. F. Tietgen. However, the Atlantis sinking scene used a large-scale model and about 500 extras as swimmers, and was filmed in the bay off Køge, Denmark.

Blom filmed two endings for the movie—one happy and one tragic. The alternate tragic ending, in which the Doctor dies at the end, was made in particular for the Russian market. It was believed that the Russians had a preference for sad endings.

=== Titanic myth ===
Some sources claimed that the sinking ship scenes were inspired by the Titanic sinking which had occurred the previous year. However, Blom based his film entirely on Gerhardt Hauptmann's 1912 novel, Atlantis. Hauptmann's novel was published in serialized form in the Berliner Tageblatt a month before the Titanic disaster. Nevertheless, due to the film's release only one year after the Titanic sinking, Atlantis became associated with the Titanic. In Norway, the film was banned because authorities felt it was in poor taste to turn a tragedy into entertainment.

=== Casting ===
Because his original story was partly autobiographical, Hauptmann's contract with Nordisk Film required two roles be acted by the actual people who were their inspiration. A letter from Nordisk Film to Fred A. Talbot of England explained, "...the part of "Ingigerd" and the armless virtuoso "Arthur Stoss" were played by the very same persons, who where [sic], so to speak, used as models by Gerhart Hauptmann, when he wrote his famous novel. These two artists, Miss Ida Orloff and Mr. C. Unthan (these are their real names) were his traveling companions on the trip across the Atlantic." Orloff had had a brief affair with Hauptmann several years earlier when she was a 16-year-old stage actress. Reviewers of Atlantis criticized the choice of Orloff because, by the time of filming, she had grown stout and was no longer the svelte young woman who could embody the eroticism of the part. Nevertheless, Nordisk Films had been forced to cast her.

The other required actor was Carl Herman Unthan (credited as Charles Unthan), a Prussian violinist who had been born without arms and learned to use his feet as hands. He played the role of Arthur Stoss, an armless virtuoso. Although his abilities were impressive, critics of Atlantis felt his appearance in the film was simply extraneous and non-integral to the story.

Another notable actor in Atlantis was Torben Meyer who went on to a long Hollywood career as a comedic character actor, usually playing a thick-accented waiter or maitr'de. Some film historians have also spotted Danish comedian Carl Schenstrøm, later the tall half of the Pat and Patachon comedy team, playing a waiter in the film. Although Schenstrøm was employed at Nordisk Film at the time, his participation has not been fully established.

== Cast ==
- Olaf Fønss as Dr. Friedrich von Kammacher
- Ida Orloff as Ingigerd Hahlstroem, artistic danser
- Ebba Thomsen as Eva Burns, sculptor
- Carl Lauritzen as Dr. Schmidt
- Frederik Jacobsen as Dr. Georg Rasmussen
- Charles Unthan as Arthur Stoss, armless virtuoso
- Torben Meyer as Willy Snyders, artist
- Cajus Bruun as Friedrich's Father
- Michael Curtiz as Hans Fuellenberg, Friedrich's Colleague (credited as Mihály Kertész)
- Marie Dinesen as Friedrich's Mother
- Lily Frederiksen as Angle', Friedrich's Wife
- Thomas P. Hejle as Office Worker
- Alma Hinding as Russian Immigrant
- Musse Kornbech as Young Canadian Woman
- Svend Kornbeck as Ship's Captain
- Bertel Krause as Artist's Agent
- Emilie Otterdahl as Lady at Fancy Dress Ball
- Albrecht Schmidt as Eva's Father
- Christian Schrøder as Ingigerd's Father
- Franz Skondrup as Stoss's Waiter/Helper
- Alfred Stigaard as Crewman Wilhelm

== American distribution ==
Distribution of the film in the United States began in 1914 through the Great Northern Film Company. Like many American films of the time, Atlantis was subject to cuts by city and state film censorship boards. The Chicago Board of Censors required cuts in two scenes with nude statues where the sex was visible.

== Restored version ==
Atlantis was restored and released on laserdisc in 1993 and in DVD format in 2005. The restoration was created through a high definition scan of a restored negative and the tinting was recreated using an abbreviated version from The National Film Center in Japan. The restored version also was made with combined intertitles in Danish and English. Extra material on the DVD included the two-minute alternative ending originally filmed for Russian audiences and the 15-minute surviving fragment of August Blom's and Holger-Madsen's 1914 film Liebelei.
