= List of Italian films of 1910 =

The following is a list of films produced in Italy in 1910:

Title	Director	Cast	Genre	Notes
1910
Alibi atroce	Luigi Maggi	Mary Cleo Tarlarini	Drama	
Amleto	Mario Caserini	Dante Cappelli, Maria Caserini	Drama	Adaptation of Hamlet
Amore di schiava	Enrique Santos	Maria Jacobini, Gennaro Righelli	Historical	
Jerusalem Delivered	Enrico Guazzoni	Amleto Novelli, Fernanda Negri Pouget, Emilio Ghione, Carlo Cattaneo	Drama	Adaption of the epic Jerusalem Delivered
