= The End of the World (1916 film) =

1916 film

- Poster of the film The End of the World
- Directed by: August Blom
- Written by: Otto Rung
- Starring: Olaf Fønss; Carl Lauritzen; Ebba Thomsen; Johanne Fritz-Petersen
- Cinematography: Louis Larsen
- Distributed by: Fotorama
- Release date: 1 April 1916
- Running time: 77 minutes
- Country: Denmark
- Languages: Silent film Danish intertitles

The film.

The End of the World (Danish: Verdens Undergang) is a 1916 Danish science fiction drama film directed by August Blom and written by Otto Rung, starring Olaf Fønss and Ebba Thomsen. The film depicts a worldwide catastrophe when an errant comet passes by Earth and causes natural disasters and social unrest. Blom and his crew created special effects for the comet disaster using showers of fiery sparks and shrouds of smoke. The film attracted a huge audience because of fears generated during the passing of Halley's Comet six years earlier, as well as the ongoing turbulence and unrest of World War I. The film is also known as The Flaming Sword. It was restored by the Danish Film Institute and released on DVD in 2006.

== Cast ==
- Olaf Fønss as Frank Stoll - Mine Owner
- Carl Lauritzen as Mineformand / Mine Forman West
- Ebba Thomsen as Dina West
- Johanne Fritz-Petersen as Edith West
- Thorleif Lund as Minearbejder / Worker Flint
- Alf Blütecher as Styrmand / Ship's Mate Reymers
- Frederik Jacobsen as Den vandrende Prædikant / The Wandering Preacher
- K. Zimmerman as Professor Wissmann
- Moritz Beilawski
- Erik Holberg

== Critical reception ==
Moving Picture World reported the following in their review following the U.S. release:

As a spectacle this production scores emphatically, and the impression left by the overwhelming calamity depicted in reels five and six is made stronger by reason of the preparation in earlier scenes... Although the spectacular scenes are of paramount importance in this picture, it should not be supposed that the production lacks other attractive qualities, in the charm of Norwegian settings and the interest aroused by a very passable story, ably acted, especially by Emma Thomsen [sic] and Olaf Fonss in the leading roles.
