= Seven Footprints to Satan =

1929 American mystery film

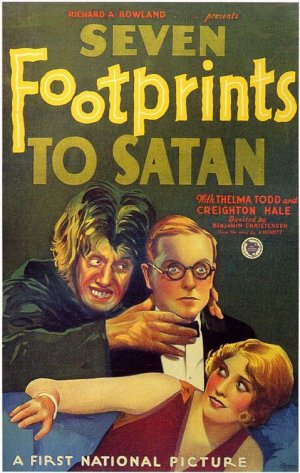
- Directed by: Benjamin Christensen
- Screenplay by: Benjamin Christensen
- Story by: Benjamin Christensen
- Based on: 7 Footprints to Satan by Abraham Merritt
- Produced by: Wid Gunning
- Starring: Creighton Hale; Thelma Todd; Sheldon Lewis; William V. Mong
- Cinematography: Sol Polito
- Edited by: Frank Ware
- Production company: First National Pictures, Inc.
- Distributed by: First National Pictures, Inc.
- Release date: January 27, 1929
- Running time: 75 minutes
- Country: United States
- Languages: Sound (Synchronized); English Intertitles
- Box office: $129,950

Seven Footprints to Satan is a Synchronized sound 1929 American mystery film directed by Danish filmmaker Benjamin Christensen. Based on the 1928 story of the same name by Abraham Merritt, it stars Thelma Todd, Creighton Hale, William V. Mong and Sheldon Lewis. Although originally planned as a part-talkie, the film was released as a synchronized film only as evidenced by all period reviews that specifically mention that the film is "Synchronized" with Exhibitors Herald World specifically stating "there is no dialogue." The film features a synchronized musical score and sound effects along with English intertitles. The film survives at the Cineteca Italiana in an alternate sound version known as an International Sound Version. The sound disks for this foreign sound version are not known to be extant.

== Plot ==
Jim Kirkham, a wealthy young man devoted to exploration and the collecting of exotic curiosities, is taken to task by his uncle for his extravagance. Obsessed with mysterious artifacts and unorthodox scientific experiments, Jim has turned his home into a kind of personal museum and laboratory. He is in love with Eve Martin, the daughter of a renowned gem collector.

At a reception at Eve’s home, a jewel is exhibited. But amid a series of unexplained occurrences, the gem mysteriously disappears. Jim and Eve leave to notify the police, but mistakenly enter the wrong automobile. The doors lock, steel shutters slam down and they are taken away

They arrive at a dark, forbidding mansion ruled by a shadowy figure who calls himself Satan. Trapped inside, Jim and Eve are swept into a nightmarish world of terror and illusion. They are pursued and tormented by a bizarre cast of characters including a witch-like old woman, a grotesque professor with an animal-like face, a crazed doctor, masked strangers, and a sinister dwarf.

They are repeatedly warned about “The Spider”, a malevolent and mysterious force within the house. Amid surreal encounters, they stumble upon a masquerade ball filled with women in elaborate gowns and men in black dominos. No one can be trusted.

To his astonishment, Jim discovers the missing gem in his own pocket. He is accused of theft and of abducting Eve. Captured by Satan’s minions, they attempt to force him to sign a confession. He refuses—until they threaten to torture Eve before his eyes. Under duress, he signs the false statement.

The lovers are separated and subjected to a whirlwind of bizarre and terrifying experiences. Satan’s Mistress seems to orchestrate much of the chaos. A helpful dwarf tries to guide them, but even he seems to have his limits. Madness threatens to overwhelm them.

Finally, they are reunited and brought before the climactic challenge: the Seven Steps, each one to be climbed by Jim. They are told the steps lead to his destiny—possibly death.

At the final moment, just as the weight of all their torment seems unbearable, the entire fantastic ordeal is explained—though only after Jim ascends the seventh and final step.

== Cast ==
- Thelma Todd as Eve
- Creighton Hale as Jim
- Sheldon Lewis as "The Spider"
- William V. Mong as The Professor
- Laska Winter as Satan's Mistress
- DeWitt Jennings as Uncle Joe
- Nora Cecil as The Old Witch
- Kalla Pasha as Professor Von Viede
- Harry Tenbrook as Eve's chauffeur
- Cissy Fitzgerald as The Old Lady
- Angelo Rossitto as The Dwarf

== Music ==
The film featured a theme song entitled "Mem'ries (Golden Memory Days)" with music by Harold Sanford and lyrics by Henry M. Neely.

== Production ==
Seven Footprints to Satan was adapted from the 1928 novel 7 Footprints to Satan by Abraham Merritt. The screenplay was written by director Benjamin Christensen under the name Richard Bee. Initially overjoyed that his story would be adapted into a film, Merritt later spoke about the film in a 1933 interview, stating that he "sat through the picture and wept. The only similarity between the book and the picture was the title. The picture likewise killed the booksale [...] for people who saw the picture felt no impulse thereafter to read the book."

Christensen cast actor Creighton Hale in the role of Jim in an attempt to capitalize on Hale's having starred in The Cat and the Canary, an earlier similar "old dark house" film.

== Release ==
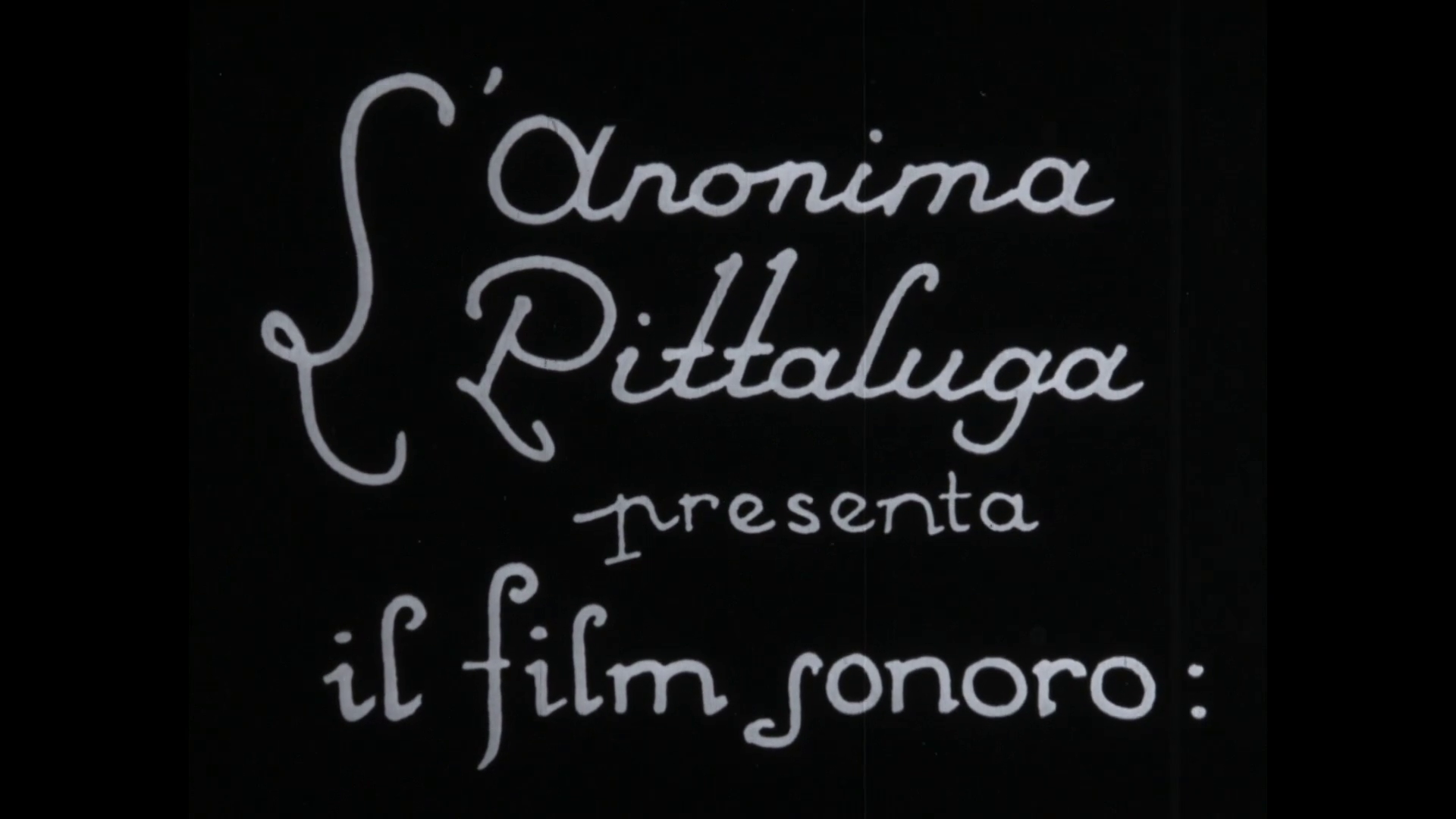
Title card of Italian print of "Seven Footprints To Satan" declaring it to be a Synchronized Sound Film ("il film sonoro")

The film was released on February 17, 1929. Due to the announcement of talking sequences in the press during the film's production before the final release many modern sources erroneously assume that the film was released as a Part-Talkie. However all period reviews of the final film state explicitly that the film is Synchronized and has no dialogue. An International Sound Version was made for export to non-English speaking audiences. This version survives in an Italian archive (Cineteca Italiana) and although the title card declares it to be a synchronized film ("il film sonoro") the print is mute. It is not known if the soundtrack discs for the foreign version survives. The Vitaphone soundtrack for the domestic version however will most likely synchronize with the film as there were no dialogue sequences in the domestic version.

The original running time of Seven Footprints to Satan is in question. In his book Thrills Untapped: Neglected Horror, Science Fiction and Fantasy Films, 1928-1936, Michael R. Pitts noted that most contemporary reviews stated the film had a 60 minute running time, seemingly referring to the domestic sound version of the film. A silent version for theatres not yet wired for sound was produced but is no longer extant. The silent release is listed as 5,267 feet, 168 feet shorter than the sound release of 5,405 feet.

Pitts described the film as a "box office flop", with a gross of $129,950.

Pitts ignored the title card in extant print from Cineteca Italiana which clearly states "il film sonoro" which translated is that the film is synchronized with sound.

== Critical response ==
Pitts described that contemporary critics were overall "not impressed" with Seven Footprints to Satan. A review in Film Daily described the film as a "has of weird and wild doings in a mysterious house with a lot of phony thrills." Movie Age opined that "Maybe we haven't seen all the so-called mystery-drama-thrillers so far released, but of those what we have seen, this Seven Footprints to Satan is one of the poorest. There is not a convincing situation in it, and the explanation of it all at the end takes the cake...no rhyme or reason." A review in Variety similarly called the film "all hokum", noting "another of those fright producers, wholly baffling from start to finish. An utterly moronic sound film appealing to all the passions." One reviewer in Photoplay stated that they loved the title of the film but found it "just a hodgepodge mystery story"

A review in Harrison's Reports commented that "People will no doubt enjoy this picture provided they don't take it seriously. It is one of the wildest mystery trapdoor melodramas that has been produced in many a moon."

== See also ==
- List of early sound feature films (1926–1929)
- List of incomplete or partially lost films
