= The Unusual Past of Thea Carter =

1929 film

- Directed by: Ernst Laemmle; Joseph Levigard
- Based on: The House of Glass, a 1916 play by George M. Cohan; Max Marcin
- Produced by: Paul Kohner
- Starring: Olaf Fønss; June Marlowe; Inge Landgut
- Cinematography: Charles J. Stumar
- Production company: Deutsche Universal-Film
- Distributed by: Deutsche Universal-Film
- Release date: November 1929
- Country: Germany
- Languages: Silent; German intertitles

The Unusual Past of Thea Carter (German: Die seltsame Vergangenheit der Thea Carter) is a 1929 German silent film directed by Ernst Laemmle and Joseph Levigard and starring Olaf Fønss, June Marlowe and Inge Landgut.

The film's art direction was by Franz Schroedter.

== Cast ==
- Olaf Fønss as Direktor Carter
- June Marlowe as Thea Carter
- Inge Landgut as Inge Carter
- Olga Engl as Oma Carter
- Ernst Stahl-Nachbaur as Van Ruyten
- Hermann Vallentin as Polizeirat Kroll
- Camilla von Hollay as Die Zofe
- Charles Charlia as Charlie Mason

== Bibliography ==
- Goble, Alan. The Complete Index to Literary Sources in Film. Walter de Gruyter, 1999.
