= His Wife, The Unknown =

1923 film

- Directed by: Benjamin Christensen
- Written by: Benjamin Christensen
- Starring: Willy Fritsch
- Cinematography: Frederik Fuglsang
- Production company: Decla-Bioscop
- Distributed by: UFA
- Release date: 19 October 1923
- Running time: 90 minutes
- Country: Germany
- Language: Silent

A Danish print of His Wife, The Unknown

His Wife, The Unknown (German: Seine Frau, die Unbekannte) is a 1923 German silent drama film directed by Benjamin Christensen. Prints of the film exist in the Det Danske Filminstitut.

== Cast ==
- Willy Fritsch as Wilbur Crawford
- Lil Dagover as Eva
- Edith Edwards as Mabel
- Karl Falkenberg as Tangotänzer
- Jaro Fürth as Polizeikommissar
- Martin Lübbert as Jack
- Karl Platen as Sam
- Paul Rehkopf as Detektiv
- Maria Reisenhofer as Crawfords Mutter
- Mathilde Sussin as Frau Hurst
- Maria Wefers as Esther
