= Mockery (1927 film) =

1927 film by Benjamin Christensen

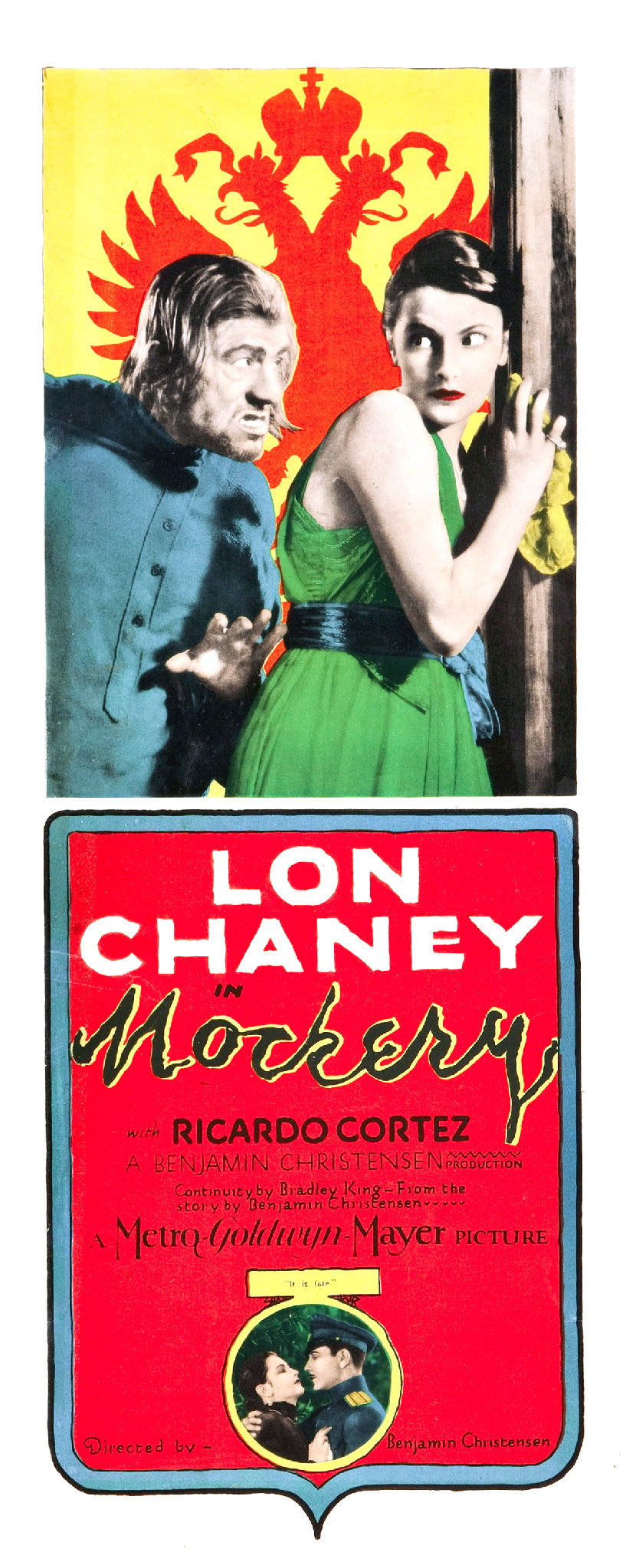
- Theatrical release three-sheet poster
- Directed by: Benjamin Christensen
- Written by: Bradley King (screenplay); Joseph Farnham (titles); Benjamin Christensen (adaptation); Stig Esbern (short story)
- Produced by: Erich Pommer
- Starring: Lon Chaney; Barbara Bedford; Ricardo Cortez; Emily Fitzroy; Charles Puffy
- Cinematography: Merritt B. Gerstad
- Edited by: John W. English
- Production company: Metro-Goldwyn-Mayer
- Distributed by: Metro-Goldwyn-Mayer
- Release date: August 13, 1927
- Running time: 75 minutes (7 reels)
- Country: United States
- Language: Silent (English intertitles)

Mockery is a 1927 American silent drama film about the Russian Revolution starring Lon Chaney. The movie was the second film made in Hollywood by Danish director Benjamin Christensen and stars Chaney as a Siberian peasant who aids a countess (played by Barbara Bedford) who is threatened by the encroaching insurgency. The screenplay was written by Bradley King, based on a story by Benjamin Christensen, which in turn was adapted from a short story by Stig Esbern. The sets were designed by Cedric Gibbons and Alexander Toluboff.

The film's original shooting title was Terror. It was in production from May 19, 1927 to June 27, 1927, and cost $187,000 to make. The film grossed $751,000 worldwide. Johnny Mack Brown, who later became a famous Western star, played a soldier in a small uncredited role. Stills exist showing Chaney's make-up as Sergei.

== Plot ==
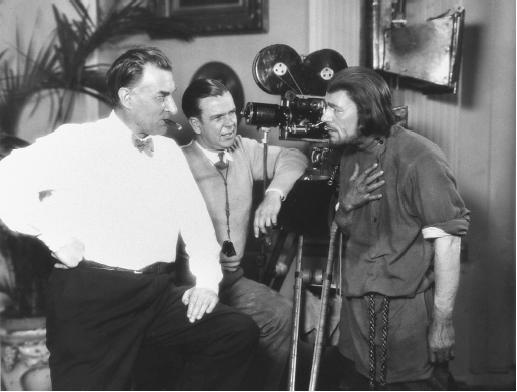
L-R: Director Benjamin Christensen, cinematographer Merritt B. Gerstad and Lon Chaney on set

Mockery (full film)

The film is set during the civil war between White (aristocratic) and Red (Communist) Russians after the Russian Revolution of 1917. Sergei, a peasant in the Siberian countryside, is starving, and searching the dead bodies of victims of recent battle for something to eat (though when a dying man calls for water, he goes to give him some before realizing he has died). Countess Tatiana Alexandrovna, who is carrying dispatches for the White side, hails him, gives him food, and persuades him to escort her to the nearby town, Novokursk, and protect her from anti-aristocrat fighters by saying she is his wife. They stop at a peasant's hut to rest, and Sergei bathes Tatiana's feet and improvises a bed for her with his fleece vest. An outlaw hiding there seizes Tatiana and calls in his friends, who menace her and beat Sergei to make him tell who she really is (which he does not know). A troop of White soldiers, led by handsome Captain Dmitri, shows up and rescues the two; Tatiana, moved by Sergei's loyalty to her, has him conveyed to the hospital in Novokursk and oversees his recovery. Dmitri finds her there, and love blooms between them.

Tatiana becomes the guest of the Gaidaroffs, a war profiteer and his wife, in their rich mansion. Sergei, recovered, comes to remind her she said they would always be friends (he never had one before); all she feels she can do is to get him a job as a servant of the Gaidaroffs. In their kitchen, he is influenced by the brutal gatekeeper, Ivan, and other servants to resent Tatiana as well as the Gaidaroffs for treating him with contempt. He begins ignoring their summons, is cowed into obeying again, and is angry about it.

The Red army nears the town, and the lower classes rise up to join them. The Gaidaroffs escape from their mansion, but Tatiana is trapped there. Ivan announces that he is going to have his way with her, so Sergei traps him and the other two kitchen servants in the cellar by placing a barrel over the trapdoor. He then goes up and demands that Tatiana treat him as an equal and kiss him as she kissed Dmitri. There is a prolonged struggle and he chases her around the abandoned mansion; she gets away from him.

Dmitri and his men show up again, rescue Tatiana and start executing Red fighters. They catch Sergei, and Dmitri asks Tatiana if he is one of them. She looks long at Sergei and the scars on his chest from the brutal whipping he took for her sake in the hut, and tells Dmitri he was loyal to her and stayed to protect her. Dmitri tasks him with continuing to do so, ironically appointing Sergei her bodyguard and leaves. Sergei, very moved by her mercy, kneels at her feet to implore pardon.

Ivan and the others escape from the cellar, and Ivan comes upstairs to threaten Tatiana. Sergei fights him and strangles him, but Ivan fatally wounds him before dying. Tatiana forgives him and says he can stay with them always. Dmitri returns and he and Tatiana embrace, and Sergei smiles at this and dies.

== Cast ==
- Lon Chaney as Sergei
- Barbara Bedford as Countess Tatiana Alexandrova
- Ricardo Cortez as Capt. Dimitri
- Mack Swain as Vladimir Gaidaroff
- Emily Fitzroy as Mrs. Gaidaroff
- Charles Puffy (aka Károly Huszár) as Ivan
- Kai Schmidt as Butler
- Johnny Mack Brown as Russian Officer
- Albert Conti as Military Commandant at Novokursk (uncredited)
- Jules Cowles as Peasant who robs Tatiana (uncredited)
- Frank Leigh as Outlaw Peasant in Cabin (uncredited)
- Russ Powell as Man taking Sergei to Ivan (uncredited)
- Buddy Rae as Russian Soldier (uncredited)
- Michael Visaroff as Cossack whipping Sergei (uncredited)
- Sam Savitsky as Guard
- Tiny Jones as Revolutionary

== Reception ==
Mockery received mixed reviews when it was first released and is still regarded as one of Chaney's weaker films of his MGM period (1924-1930).

"Like its central character, the narrative of MOCKERY, the latest production featuring the estimable Lon Chaney, is lumbering, dull-witted and, on the whole, unconvincing...Mr. Chaney's individual efforts throughout this film are strikingly painstaking, and he undoubtedly looks the part of the greasy, long-haired rural derelict with a hare-lip. The fault lies however with Benjamin Christensen, the director." --- The New York Times

"Lon Chaney is running rapidly through the list of human ailments and tribulations. In MOCKERY he plays a slow thinking Russian peasant with a harelip...This star is the only film luminary who can play dumb gents minus sex appeal and still ring the gong at the boxoffice. A good melodrama held up to a keen edge of intensity by Lon Chaney's highly effective character playing." --- Photoplay

"Lon Chaney is put through a routine of pug-ugly mugging, but even this flops, as somehow he hardly achieves the ferocious power of facial characterization he has often managed to convey in other productions...It lowers the star's batting average considerably." ---Variety

"Given a new character and a story with infinite possibilities, Lon Chaney achieves but a moderate success because the author-director has fallen short in both capacities. He adds another fine study to his album of make-up, but he does not add another triumph to his list because he is so hopelessly encumbered by the amateurishness of the plot development and handling." ---Moving Picture World

Film historian Jon C. Mirsalis opined "MOCKERY was one of Chaney's weakest MGM entries, a dreary melodrama in which he does little more than lumber about the set. Much of the blame for the film rests with Christensen, a Danish director brought to the U.S. by MGM. Christensen's Danish pictures are brilliant, but his productions at MGM were misfires. Far more concerned with style than story, the film is beautifully shot, but falls completely flat. Chaney would bounce back with several hits after this dud."

"Star does good work but against a drab background and in a story that is generally not attractive." ---Film Daily

"Masterfully produced, but it is gruesome to the point of being repulsive. Mr. Chaney again does wonderful work...he is presented as a peasant, filthy in body and dull in mind; and no one can feel sympathy for such a person.... Not for the family circle, and particularly not good for the children." ---Harrison's Reports

== Preservation status ==
The 16mm and 35mm prints are held at the George Eastman Museum. The film was thought to have been lost until the mid-1970s. George Eastman House has a print. The film is today readily available on DVD.
