= Häxan =

Swedish 1922 silent horror essay film

- Swedish theatrical release poster
- Directed by: Benjamin Christensen
- Screenplay by: Benjamin Christensen
- Starring: Benjamin Christensen; Clara Pontoppidan; Oscar Stribolt; Astrid Holm; Maren Pedersen
- Cinematography: Johan Ankerstjerne
- Edited by: Edla Hansen
- Production company: Svensk Filmindustri
- Distributed by: Skandias Filmbyrå (Sweden)
- Release date: 18 September 1922 (Sweden)
- Running time: 105 minutes (restoration); 74 minutes (1968 version)
- Country: Sweden
- Language: Silent film with Swedish intertitles
- Budget: SEK 2 million

Häxan (Swedish: [ˈhɛ̂ksan], The Witch; Heksen Danish: [hɛksən], The Witch; English: The Witches; released in the US in 1968 as Witchcraft Through the Ages) is a 1922 Swedish-Danish silent horror essay film written and directed by Benjamin Christensen. Consisting partly of documentary-style storytelling as well as dramatized narrative sequences, the film purports to chart the historical roots and superstitions surrounding witchcraft, beginning in the Middle Ages through the 20th century. Based partly on Christensen's own study of the Malleus Maleficarum, a 15th-century German guide for inquisitors, Häxan proposes that such witch-hunts may have stemmed from misunderstandings of mental or neurological disorders, triggering mass hysteria.

The movie was produced by Swedish AB Svensk Filmindustri but shot in Denmark in 1920–1921. With Christensen's meticulous recreation of medieval scenes and its lengthy production period, the film was the most expensive Scandinavian silent film ever made at the time, costing nearly two million Swedish kronor. Although it received some positive reception in Denmark and Sweden, censors in countries such as Germany, France, and the United States objected to what were considered at that time graphic depictions of torture, nudity, and sexual perversion, as well as anti-clericalism.

In 1968, Metro Pictures Corporation re-edited and re-released Häxan in the US under the title Witchcraft Through the Ages. This version includes an English-language narration by William S. Burroughs. The original Swedish-language version of Häxan has undergone three restorations by the Swedish Film Institute, carried out in 1976, 2007 and 2016. Since its initial release, Häxan has received praise for its combination of documentary-style and narrative storytelling, as well as its visual imagery, and has been called Christensen's masterpiece.

== Plot ==
Häxan (1922)

=== Part 1 ===
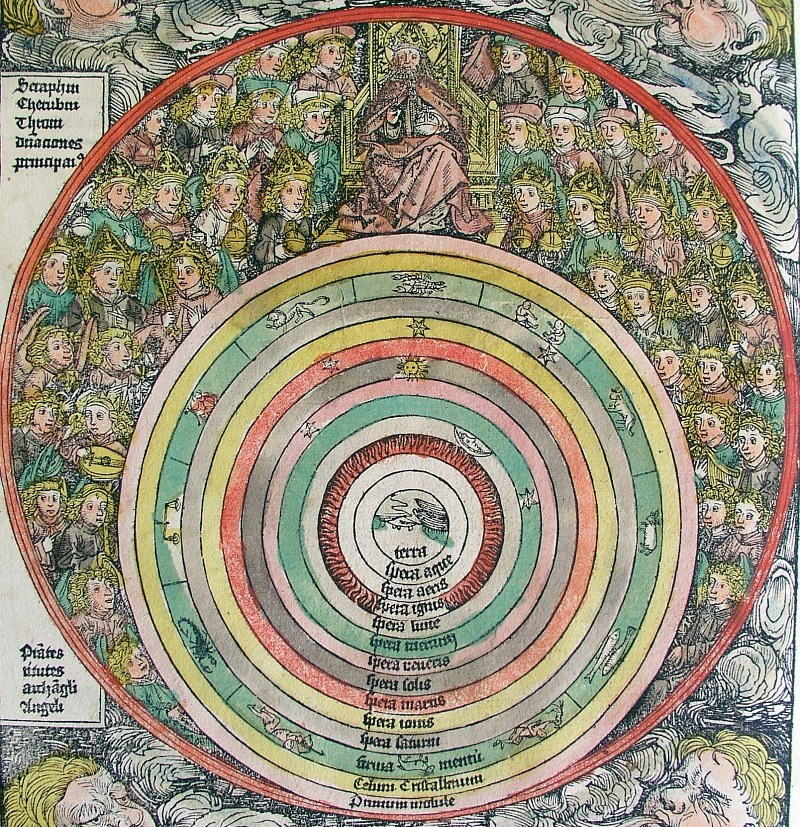
This geocentric model of the universe, similar to a model used in the film, depicts the Earth at the universe's center, surrounded by layers of air and fire, the Solar System, the stars, and finally God with choirs of angels.

A scholarly dissertation on the appearances of demons and witches in primitive and medieval culture, the first segment of the film uses a number of photographs of statuary, paintings, and woodcuts as demonstrative pieces. In addition, several large scale models are employed to demonstrate medieval concepts of the structure of the Solar System and the commonly accepted depiction of Hell. Christensen attributes this medieval view of the universe to the works of assyriologist Henry Rawlinson and egyptologist Gaston Maspero.

=== Part 2 ===
The second segment of the film is a series of vignettes that theatrically demonstrate medieval superstition and beliefs concerning witchcraft, including Satan tempting a sleeping woman away from her husband's bed, terrorizing a group of monks, then murdering another woman in her bed by choking her. Also shown is a woman purchasing a love potion from a supposed witch named Karna in order to seduce a monk, and a supposed witch named Apelone dreaming of waking up in a castle, where Satan presents her with coins that she is unable to hold on to and festivities that she is unable to participate in.

=== Parts 3–5 ===
Set in the Middle Ages, this narrative is used to demonstrate the treatment of suspected witches by the religious authorities of the time. A printer named Jesper dies in bed, and his family consequently accuses an old woman, Maria the weaver, of causing his death through witchcraft. Jesper's wife Anna visits the residence of traveling Inquisition judges, grasping one of their arms in desperation and asking that they try Maria for witchcraft.

Maria is arrested, and after being tortured by inquisitors, admits to involvement in witchcraft. She describes giving birth to children fathered by Satan, being smeared with witch ointment, and attending a Witches' Sabbath, where she claims that witches and sorcerers desecrated a cross, feasted with demons, and kissed Satan's buttocks. She "names" other supposed witches, including two of the women in Jesper's household. Eventually, Anna is arrested as a witch when the inquisitor whose arm she grabbed accuses her of bewitching him. She is tricked into what is perceived as a confession, and is sentenced to be burned at the stake. Intertitles claim that over eight million women, men and children were burned as witches. (Note: In a 2001 audio commentary featuring film scholar Casper Tybjerg, Tybjerg notes that the actual figure is closer to 50,000. In an essay published by the Criterion Collection, writer and academic Chloé Germaine Buckley refers to the number as being around 80,000.)

=== Parts 6–7 ===
The final segments of the film seek to demonstrate how the superstitions of old have become better understood. Christensen offers the threat of medieval torture methods as an explanation for why many supposed heretics confessed to being involved in witchcraft. Though he does not deny the existence of the Devil, Christensen claims that those accused of witchcraft may have been suffering from what are recognized in modern times as mental or neurological disorders. A nun named Sister Cecilia is depicted as being coerced by Satan into desecrating a consecrated host and stealing a statue of the baby Jesus. Her actions are then contrasted with vignettes about a somnambulist, a pyromaniac, and a kleptomaniac. It is suggested that such behaviors would have been thought of as demonically-influenced in medieval times, whereas modern societies recognize them as psychological ailments (referred to in the film as hysteria). The film ends with a contrast between a woman being sent away to a mental institution and a scene where supposed witches burn on the stake.

== Cast ==
The cast of Häxan includes:

- Benjamin Christensen as the Devil
- Ella la Cour as Sorceress Karna
- Emmy Schønfeld as Karna's Assistant
- Kate Fabian as the Old Maid
- Oscar Stribolt as Fat Monk
- Wilhelmine Henriksen as Apelone
- Astrid Holm as Anna, wife of Jesper the printer
- Elisabeth Christensen as Anna's Mother
- Karen Winther as Anna's Sister
- Maren Pedersen as the Witch (Maria the Weaver)
- Johannes Andersen as Pater Henrik, Witch Judge
- Elith Pio as Johannes, Witch Judge
- Aage Hertel as Witch Judge
- Ib Schønberg as Witch Judge
- Holst Jørgensen as Peter Titta (called "Ole Kighul" in Denmark)
- Clara Pontoppidan as Sister Cecilia, Nun
- Elsa Vermehren as Flagellating Nun
- Alice O'Fredericks as Nun
- Gerda Madsen as Nun
- Karina Bell as Nun
- Tora Teje as the Hysterical Woman
- Poul Reumert as the Jeweller
- H.C. Nilsen as the Jeweller's Assistant
- Albrecht Schmidt as the Psychiatrist
- Knud Rassow as the Anatomist

== Themes and interpretations ==
=== Cinematic realism ===
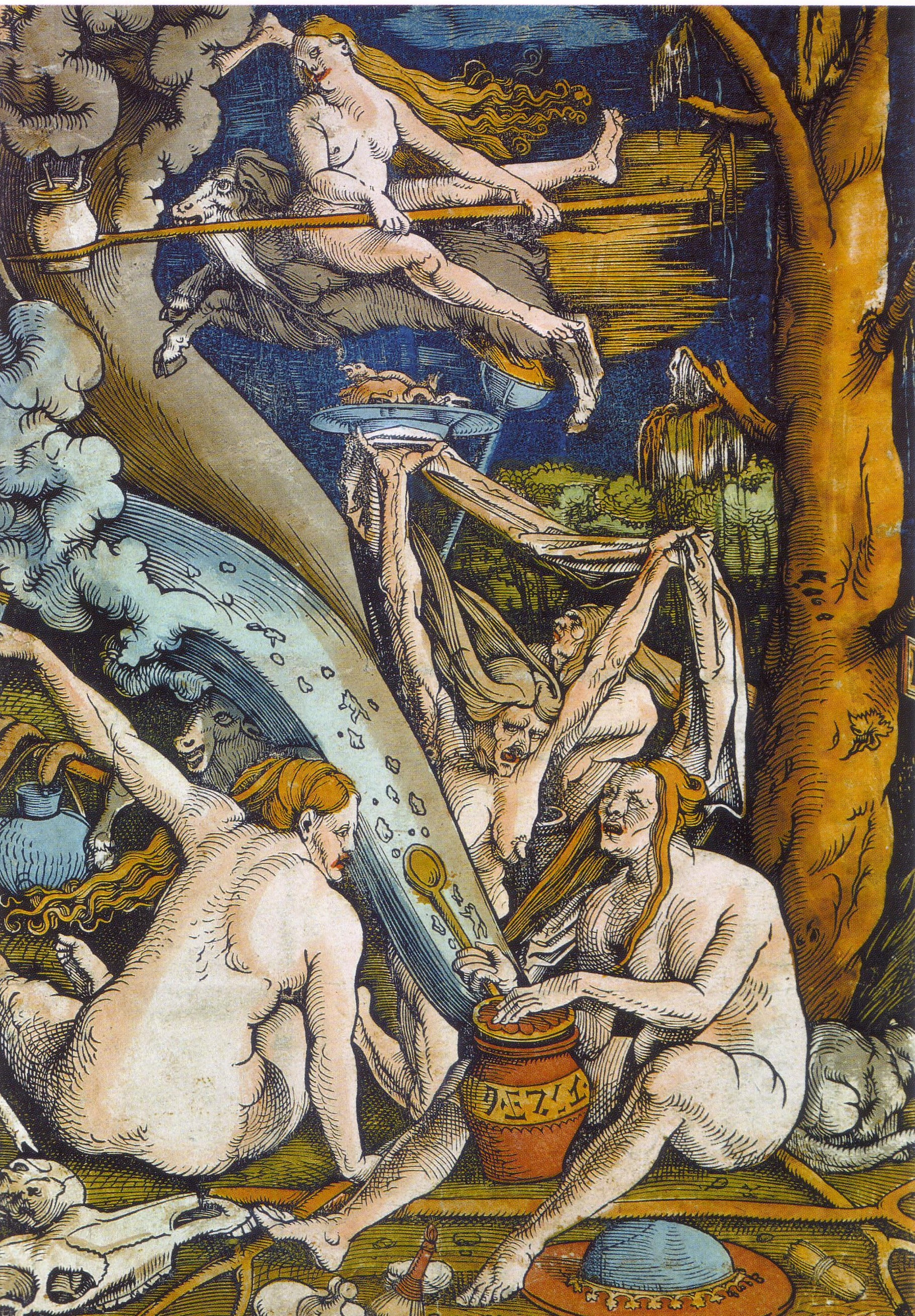
The Witches' Sabbath by Hans Baldung (woodcut), 1508

Writer Chris Fujiwara notes the way in which the film "places together, on the same level of cinematic depiction, fact and fiction, objective reality and hallucination." He writes that "The realism with which the fantasy scenes are staged and acted hardly differs from the style of the workshop ones, which we have had no reason not to accept as taking place within reality", and that, as such, the audience is lead "into a space where the irrational is always ready to intrude, in lurid forms."

Fujiwara highlights a moment in the film in which Christensen claims that actress Maren Pedersen, between takes, "raised her tired face to me and said: 'The devil is real. I have seen him sitting by my bedside.'" Fujiwara writes: "No doubt Christensen was conscious of the analogy between the character's confession to the inquisitors and the actor's confession to him, between their torture implements and his camera. By likening his own activity as a director to the deeds of the inquisitors, Christensen puts himself near the head of a self-critical tradition in cinema that would later include Jean-Luc Godard and Abbas Kiarostami."

=== Depiction of witchcraft and feminist readings ===
Academic Chloé Germaine Buckley referred to Häxan's examination of witchcraft as "quasi-feminist" in nature, writing: "Christensen focuses on the history of witchcraft in order to show the way that the oppression of women takes on different guises in different historical periods. Using ideas from the psychoanalytic theory that was emerging at the time, Christensen suggests a link between contemporary diagnoses of hysteria and the European witch-hunts of the medieval and early modern eras. This connection casts the twentieth-century physician who would confine troubled young women in his clinic in the role of inquisitor." Buckley connects tropes of witchcraft referenced in Häxan, such as witches consuming infants or transforming into animals, to a perceived "illegitimacy of female power", and that, as such, "the evil-witch stereotype has become such a convenient tool for the propagation of misogynistic ideas." She also notes that the film suggests "an intersection of gender and social class: witches are not only women, they are poor women."

=== Sexual repression and Freudian themes ===
Regarding the scenes featuring Sister Cecilia being influenced by Satan in the film's final two segments, Tanya Krzywinska asserts the presence of an underlying theme of sexual repression. She claims that the film has a "libertarian message", with demonic possession being a result of the "unnatural sexual continence that is demanded of the young nuns." Krzywinska further suggests that the film "follows a broadly Freudian line in linking possession to hysteria. The basis of this idea is that repressed sexual desires are dynamic and, rather than lying dormant, actively find ways of being fulfilled in exaggerated and extreme ways."

== Production ==
After finding a copy of the Malleus Maleficarum in a Berlin bookshop, Christensen spent two years—from 1919 to 1921—studying manuals, illustrations and treatises on witches and witch-hunting. He included a lengthy bibliography in the original playbill at the film's premiere. He intended to create an entirely new film rather than an adaptation of literary fiction, which was the case for films of that day. "In principal [sic] I am against these adaptations... I seek to find the way forward to original films."

Christensen obtained funding from the large Swedish production company Svensk Filmindustri, preferring it over the local Danish film studios, so that he could maintain complete artistic freedom. He used the money to buy and refurbish the Astra film studio in Hellerup, Denmark. Filming then ran from February through October 1921. Christensen and cinematographer Johan Ankerstjerne filmed only at night or in a closed set to maintain the film's dark hue. Film historian Casper Tybjerg described how “Christiansen worked at his own pace, often at night, and scandalous rumors circulated about what went on when the studio doors were closed”. Post-production required another year before the film premiered in late 1922. Total cost for Svensk Film, including refurbishing the Astra Film Studio, reached between 1.5 and 2 million kronor, making Häxan the most expensive Scandinavian silent film in history.

=== Special effects ===
Witches flying through the sky

The film makes use of a number of special effects techniques in its depictions of the occult, including puppetry and stop motion animation. Various demons are portrayed by actors wearing special-effects makeup; superimposition is used to depict witches flying over villages and having out-of-body experiences in their sleep, and reverse motion is used in one sequence to make coins appear to fly from a table into the air.

== Music ==
Häxan has had numerous different live scores over the years. When it premiered in Sweden, its accompaniment was compiled from pre-existing compositions. Details of the selection, which met with the director's enthusiastic approval, have been lost, but it was probably the same documented music as for the Copenhagen premiere two months later. In Copenhagen, it was played by a 50-piece orchestra, and this score, combining pieces by Schubert, Gluck, and Beethoven, was restored and recorded with a smaller ensemble by arranger/conductor Gillian Anderson for the 2001 Criterion Collection DVD edition.

In 2019, composer Tristan Gianola re-scored Häxan with a modern chamber ensemble, that fused classical, jazz, and experimental textures. It premiered in New Orleans in 2023.

== Releases ==
The film premiered on 18 September 1922 in four Swedish cities — Stockholm, Helsingborg, Malmö, and Gothenburg—simultaneously, unusual for Sweden at the time. Häxan received its Danish premiere in Copenhagen on 7 November 1922, and was re-released in Denmark in 1931 with an extended introduction by Christensen. The intertitles are thought to have been different in this version.

In 1968, Metro Pictures Corporation re-edited and re-released Häxan in the United States as Witchcraft Through the Ages, adding narration by William S. Burroughs and a jazz score by Daniel Humair, which was played by a quintet that included Jean-Luc Ponty on violin.

== Reception ==
=== Contemporary response ===
Häxan received a somewhat lukewarm, but mostly positive, response from critics upon its original release. As academic James Kendrick wrote, initial reviewers of the film "were confounded by [its] boundary-crossing aesthetic." Its thematic content stirred controversy as well. A contemporary critic in Variety, for example, praised the film's acting, production, and its many scenes of "unadulterated horror", but added that "wonderful though this picture is, it is absolutely unfit for public exhibition." A Copenhagen reviewer was likewise offended by "the satanic, perverted cruelty that blazes out of it, the cruelty we all know has stalked the ages like an evil shaggy beast, the chimera of mankind. But when it is captured, let it be locked up in a cell, either in a prison or a madhouse. Do not let it be presented with music by Wagner or Chopin, [...] to young men and women, who have entered the enchanted world of a movie theatre."

Conversely, a critic for The New York Times wrote in 1929: "The picture is, for the most part, fantastically conceived and directed, holding the onlooker in a sort of medieval spell. Most of the characters seem to have stepped from primitive paintings." The film also came to acquire a cult following among surrealists, who greatly admired its subversion of cultural norms of the time.

=== Retrospective assessments ===
Häxan has become regarded by critics and scholars as Christensen's finest work. On the review aggregator website Rotten Tomatoes, the film has a 93% approval rating, with an average rating of 7.7/10, based on 29 reviews. Häxan is listed in the film reference book 1001 Movies You Must See Before You Die by Steven Jay Scheider, who writes: "Part earnest academic exercise in correlating ancient fears with misunderstandings about mental illness and part salacious horror movie, Häxan is truly a unique work that still holds power to unnerve, even in today's jaded era." Author James J. Mulay praised the film's makeup effects, sets, costumes, and casting, as well as Christensen's "dynamic combination of both stage tricks and innovative camera techniques [...] [that he uses] to create his fantastical world."

David Sanjek of PopMatters wrote: "The dazzling manner in which Haxan shifts from illustrated lecture to historical reenactment to special effects shots of witches on their broomsticks to modern-dress drama pointed to ways the documentary format could be used that others would not draw on until years into the future." Peter Cowie similarly argued in Eighty Years of Cinema that it established Christensen as "an auteur of uncommon imagination and with a pictorial flair far ahead of his time." Time Out London called it a "weird and rather wonderful brew of fiction, documentary and animation". Film critic Leonard Maltin awarded the film three out of a possible four stars, lauding it as "visually stunning" and "genuinely scary". He additionally praised the director's performance as Satan.

Dave Kehr of the Chicago Reader suggested that the film's "episodic, rhetorical structure [...] would have appealed to Jean-Luc Godard", and wrote that "Christensen apparently intended [Häxan] as a serious study of witchcraft (which he diagnoses, in an early pop-Freud conclusion, as female hysteria), but what he really has is a pretense for sadistic pornography. The film has acquired impact with age: instead of seeming quaint, the nude scenes and scatological references now have a crumbly, sinister quality—they seem the survivals of ancient, unhealthy imaginations."

Ghostwatch screenwriter Stephen Volk regards the film as "a visceral experience disguised as an erudite thesis", and sets it in the same league as Nosferatu and Vampyr.

== Restorations and home media ==
The Swedish Film Institute has carried out three restorations of Häxan:

- 1976 tinted photochemical restoration
- 2007 tinted photochemical restoration
- 2016 tinted digital restoration

The 1976 restoration was released on DVD in the US and the United Kingdom in 2001 by the Criterion Collection and Tartan Video, along with Witchcraft Through the Ages. The 2007 restoration was released on DVD in Sweden by Svenska Filminstitutet. In 2019, the Criterion Collection released the 2016 digital restoration exclusively on Blu-ray in US.

== See also ==
- European science in the Middle Ages
- Haxan Films
- List of cult films
- List of films about witchcraft

== Bibliography ==
- Scheider, Steven Jay (2013). 1001 Movies You Must See Before You Die. Murdoch Books Pty Limited. p. 40. ISBN 978-0-7641-6613-6.
