= Orphan of Lowood =

1926 film

- Directed by: Curtis Bernhardt
- Written by: Henry Koster
- Based on: Jane Eyre by Charlotte Brontë
- Produced by: Julius Sternheim
- Starring: Evelyn Holt; Olaf Fønss; Dina Diercks; Jenny Marba
- Cinematography: Charles Métain; Sophus Wangöe
- Music by: Felix Bartsch
- Production company: Sternheim Film
- Distributed by: Filmhaus Bruckmann
- Release date: 5 December 1926
- Running time: length unknown
- Country: Germany
- Languages: Silent; German intertitles

Orphan of Lowood (German: Die Waise von Lowood) is a 1926 German silent drama film directed by Curtis Bernhardt and starring Evelyn Holt, Olaf Fønss and Dina Diercks. It is based on the 1847 British novel Jane Eyre by Charlotte Brontë, and is the last of at least eight silent film adaptations of the novel. It was shot at the Terra Studios in Marienfelde. Director Bernhardt, a Jew wanted by the Gestapo, escaped from Nazi Germany and immigrated to Hollywood (via England) where he directed films for MGM, RKO, Columbia Pictures and Warner Brothers.

== Plot ==
Jane Eyre falls in love with the eccentric Lord Edward Rochester, not realizing he has his mentally ill wife locked up in the attic.

== Cast ==
- Evelyn Holt as Jane Eyre
- Olaf Fønss as Lord Edward Rochester
- Dina Diercks as Blanche Ingram
- Jenny Marba as Lady Fairfax
- Rosa Valetti as Grace Poole
- Adele Sandrock as Lady Ingram
- Charles Lincoln as Leutnant Eshrom
- Harry Nestor as Richard Mason
- Fritz Rasp as Brocklehurst
- Hermine Sterler as Lehrerin
- Evi Moog as Child
- Christel Adam as Child

== Bibliography ==
- Bergfelder, Tim & Bock, Hans-Michael. The Concise Cinegraph: Encyclopedia of German. Berghahn Books, 2009.
- Koepnick, Lutz. The Dark Mirror: German Cinema Between Hitler and Hollywood.University of California Press, 2002.
