= Edla Hansen =

Danish film editor

- Born: Edla Vilhelmine Hansen; 10 March 1883; Denmark
- Died: 6 March 1979 (aged 95); Denmark
- Occupation: Film editor
- Years active: 1922–1950
- Spouse: Holger Christian Hansen

Edla Hansen was a Danish film editor active from the 1920s through the 1950s. One of the best-known films she edited was 1922's Häxan.

== Biography ==
Hansen grew up in Copenhagen and began working as a film cutter at Nordisk Film in 1915. She later spent time at A/S Palladium and Valby. She was married to Holger Christian Hansen.

== Selected filmography ==
- Susanne (1950)
- For frihed og ret (1949)
- Tre år efter (1948)
- Take What You Want (1947)
- Ditte, Child of Man (1946)
- Discretion Wanted (1946)
- Bolette's Bridal Shower (1938)
- Der var engang (1922)
- Häxan (1922)
