= The Hawk's Nest =

1928 film

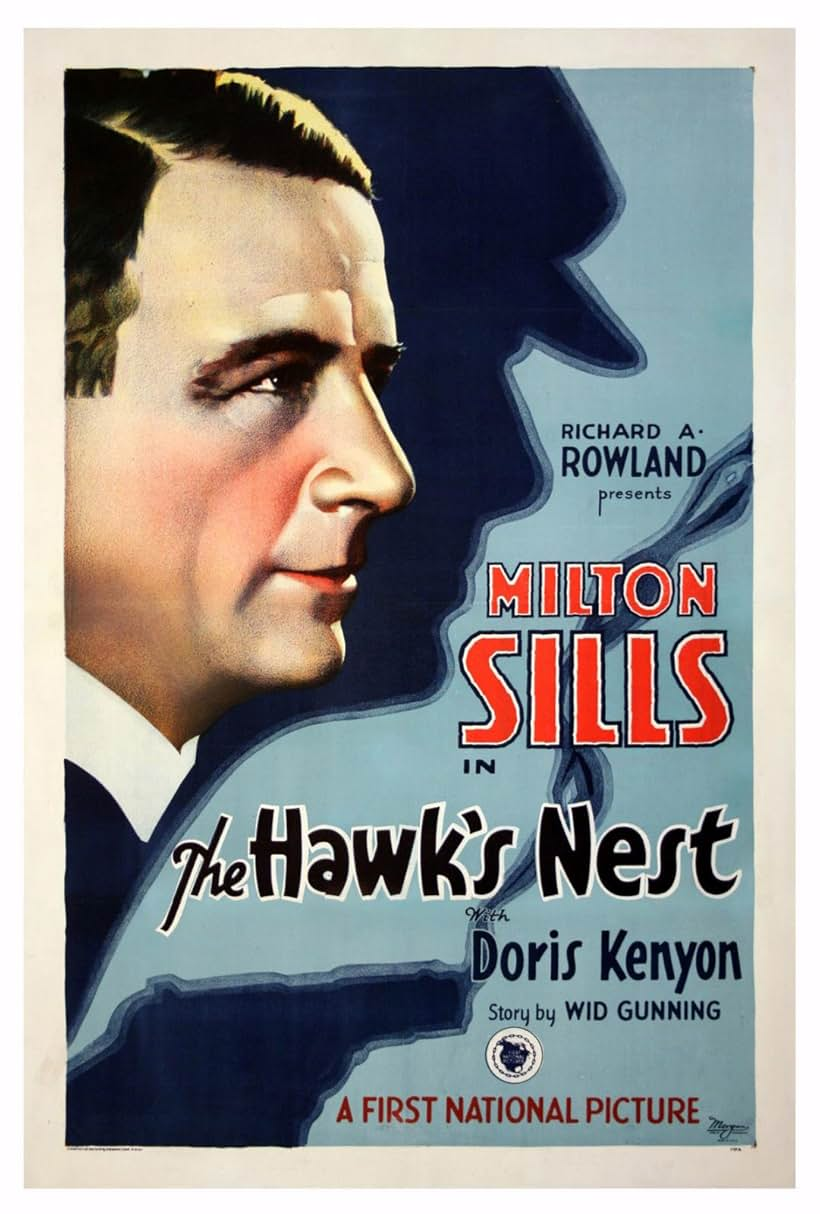
- Directed by: Benjamin Christensen
- Written by: Wid Gunning (story); James T. O'Donohoe (adaptation); Casey Robinson (titles)
- Starring: Milton Sills; Doris Kenyon; Sōjin Kamiyama; Montagu Love; Mitchell Lewis; Stuart Holmes
- Cinematography: Sol Polito
- Edited by: Frank Ware
- Distributed by: First National Pictures
- Release date: May 27, 1928
- Country: United States
- Language: English

The Hawk's Nest is a 1928 American film directed by Benjamin Christensen. It is believed to be lost. It was released by First National Pictures and stars husband and wife Milton Sills and Doris Kenyon.

== Plot ==
The title of The Hawk's Nest comes from the speakeasy around which most of the action revolves. Two bootleggers quarrel over a dancer while a political assassination plot.

== Cast ==
- Milton Sills - The Hawk/John Finchley
- Doris Kenyon - Madelon Arden
- Sōjin Kamiyama - Sojin
- Montagu Love - Dan Daugherty
- Mitchell Lewis - James Kent
- Stuart Holmes - Barney McGuire
- James Bradbury Jr. - Gangster(uncredited)

== Preservation status ==
- No prints survive, it is now lost.
