= A Debt of Honour (1921 film) =

1921 film directed by Paul L. Stein

- Directed by: Paul L. Stein
- Written by: Harriet Bloch; Marie Luise Droop
- Starring: Olaf Fønss; Boris Michailow; Gertrude Welcker; Karl Platen
- Cinematography: Gustave Preiss
- Production company: Goron Film
- Release date: 4 August 1921
- Country: Germany
- Languages: Silent; German intertitles

A Debt of Honour (German: Ehrenschuld) is a 1921 German silent drama film directed by Paul L. Stein and starring Olaf Fønss, Boris Michailow and Gertrude Welcker. It premiered in Berlin on 4 August 1921 at the Marmorhaus.

== Cast ==
- Olaf Fønss
- Boris Michailow as Rolf, der Kranke
- Gertrude Welcker as Tochter
- Karl Platen as Arzt
- Editha Seidel as die Braut
- Willy Kaiser-Heyl as Vater Holberg
- Waldemar Potier

== Bibliography ==
- Grange, William. Cultural Chronicle of the Weimar Republic.Scarecrow Press, 2008.
