= Ida Orloff =

Austrian actress

- Born: Ida Margaretha Weissbeck; Ida Siegler von Eberswald; 16 February 1889; St. Petersburg, Russian Empire
- Died: 9 April 1945 (aged 56); Tullnerbach, Nazi Germany
- Years active: 1905–1941
- Spouse(s): Karl Satter (1907-1919); Franz Leppman (1921-1938)
- Children: 4

Ida Orloff (also written Ida Orlov, pseudonym of Ida Siegler von Eberswald; 16 February 1889 – 9 April 1945) was an Austrian stage and silent film actress during the early 20th century. Orloff's relationship with novelist Gerhardt Hauptmann inspired him to create the heroine of his fairy tale And Pippa Dances and the lead of the 1913 film Atlantis after her.

== Early life and education ==
Orloff was born Ida Margaretha Weissbeck on 16 February 1889 in St. Petersburg, Russia, the daughter of Georg Weissbeck, a brewery manager who had emigrated from Hesse, Prussia to Russia. Her father died when she was about six-years-old, after which her mother relocated Ida and her two siblings to Germany and then to Vienna, Austria. Her mother then married an Austrian nobleman without wealth, Army Captain Heinrich von Siegler, Edler von Eberswald. Ida's name was changed to Ida Siegler von Eberswald. Educated initially in a convent, she pursued advanced training at Vienna's Ottosche Theaterschule following her stepfather's death.

== Career ==
In 1905, at the age of 16, Orloff appeared in a private performance of Frank Wedekind's Pandora's Box with Wedekind and his wife. Drama critic Otto Brahm was impressed with Orloff's acting and invited her to audition for his theater in Berlin. Brahm placed Orloff on a 3-year contract but the salary low, so she still lived with her mother. For the Berlin stage, she adopted the stage name of Ida Orloff.

During her first year, Orloff gave notable performances in Henrik Ibsen's The Wild Duck and Gerhardt Hauptmann's The Assumption of Hannele. The seventeen-year-old Orloff then began a relationaship with novelist Hauptmann and became his muse. Hauptmann was inspired to create the heroine of his fairy tale And Pippa Dances. He frequently signed his letters to her as "Your Wann" in reference to the male lead to Pippa. Although the affair lasted only a year, Hauptmann wrote the female lead of Atlantis for her. Orloff last met Hauptmann in 1942, at a grand reception hosted by the government in honour of his 80th birthday.

Orloff became "renowned for her performances of modern high literature at leading German theaters", according to historians Jennifer Kapczynski and Michael Richardson. She met and began a relationship with him in 1905. Critics admired her theater work for its youthfulness, beauty and grace. However, her promising talent was not fulfilled in more mature roles and by 1910, she was no longer being hired on German stages.

Orloff moved to Austria and appeared in several productions at the royal court theater, the Burgtheater, in Vienna. Reviews of her performances were mediocre. She was dismissed from the Burgtheater in 1913 following an undisclosed but scandalous break with the theater's director. Hauptmann insisted the Danish director August Blom cast her in the lead role in the 1913 film Atlantis.

Orloff tried creating her own theater troop in Saint Petersburg for German-language plays but the effort failed after only a few performances. Thereafter, she performed in Sweden, Germany and Austria but only on minor stages.

With the creation of the Rundfunk(German Public Radio), Orloff was employed until 1933 poetry and gave dramatic readings over the Berlin radio.ref name="auto"/> With the rise of the Nazi persecution, Orloff and her husband, Jewish writer Franz Leppman fled to Florence and then to London where she was a seamstress and he found work as a janitor until obtaining work with the British Broadcasting System. In 1938, Orloff returned to Nazi Germany with their son and divorced her husband. She then worked in productions to entertain the German troops.

When the bombing of Berlin intensified in 1944, her oldest son moved her to a small village outside of Vienna.

== Personal life and death ==
Orloff married her theater-school friend, Karl Satter, on July 23, 1907. She gave birth to their son, Heinrich in September of that year. Satter was issued a divorce decree in 1908 but he remained in a relationship with Orloff. She gave birth to two more of their children: Peter in 1916 who died as an infant; and Herman Rudolf Karl in 1918. In 1919, Satter finalized their separation.

Due to a precarious financial situation, Orloff proposed marriage to the Jewish writer Franz Leppman. He first refused, but they were married in 1921 and she gave birth to their son, Wolfgang, in 1922. She divorced him in 1938.

With the Battle of Vienna only a few miles away from her home in the village of Tullnerbach, Orloff decided not to flee because she thought her Russian birth and fluency of the language would keep her safe from the Russian army. She was attacked by Russian soldiers and Orloff committed suicide by overdose at her home on April 9, 1945.

== Filmography ==
- Atlantis (1913)
- Baccarat (1919)
