= The Vampire Dancer =

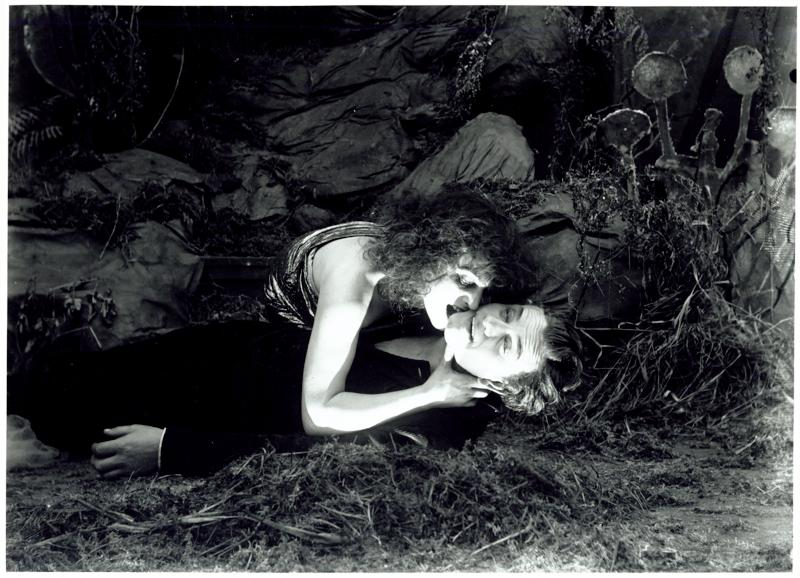
- Still from the film
- Danish: Vampyrdanserinden
- Directed by: August Blom
- Release date: March 4, 1912 (Denmark)
- Language: Silent

The Vampire Dancer (Danish: Vampyrdanserinden) is a 1912 Danish silent erotic vampire film directed by August Blom. The film was imported to the United States where it was banned in San Francisco for being salacious. The film marks probably the first depiction of a vampire biting a victim on screen.
