= Helena Cavallier =

- Born: May 5, 1855; Barcelona, Catalonia
- Died: April 15, 1920 (aged 64); Rio de Janeiro, Brazil
- Occupation: Actresses
- Years active: 1909–1910

Helena Cavallier (May 5, 1855 – April 15, 1920) was a silent film and stage actress, known for her characters in Pela Vitória dos Clubes Carnavalescos (1909), Os Dois Proscritos ou a Restauração de Portugal em 1640 (1909) or Mil Adultérios (1910).

She died on April 15, 1920, in Rio de Janeiro, Brazil.

== Theatre ==
- A Morgadinha de Val de Flôr (1879)
- As doutoras (1897)

== Selected filmography ==
- Noivado de Sangue (1909)
- Pela Vitória dos Clubes Carnavalescos (1909)
- Os Dois Proscritos ou a Restauração de Portugal em 1640 (1909)
- Mil Adultérios (1910)
