= O Fósforo Eleitoral =

1909 film directed by Antônio Serra

O Fósforo Eleitoral (The Election Match) is an early silent Brazilian film, released in 1909. A short comedy film, it was directed by Antonio Serra and released on November 2, 1909. It was shot in Rio de Janeiro, and produced by the company Labanca, Leal e Cia., in partnership with the Photo-Cinematographia Brasileira.

According to a review published by the Jornal do Brasil at the time of release, the film offered a witty but severe criticism of elections in Rio de Janeiro.

== Cast ==
- Adelaide Coutinho
- Eduardo Leite
- Emílio Silva
