= Ebba Thomsen =

Danish actress

- Born: 3 May 1887; Copenhagen, Denmark
- Died: 18 December 1973 (aged 86); Copenhagen, Denmark
- Occupation: Actress
- Years active: 1910 — 1952
- Spouse: Thorleif Lund

Ebba Thomsen (3 May 1887 – 18 December 1973) was a Danish actress during the golden era of silent films in Denmark. Thomsen was best known for her roles as the elegant leading lady opposite the Danish matinee idol Valdemar Psilander.

== Life and career ==
Ebba Thomsen was born in Copenhagen, Denmark on 3 May 1887, the daughter of Ove Thomsen, one of the leading Danish fashion designers. Thomsen debuted on stage at Det Ny Teater in 1910 and began to perform in cinema in 1912 at Nordisk Film. From then until the early 1920s, Thomsen appeared in about 75 films—mostly as the lead actress—and achieved star status in Denmark. Her most notables roles were in films in which she worked with Nordisk Film's biggest male star, Valdemar Psilander.

In a newspaper interview for her 50th birthday, Thomsen said that her "unique success depended on two things: First, that Psilander and I suited one another. I was actually a little too tall for him, yet our types suited each other, our movements, our acting. In short, we were a born 'film-couple'." Thomsen then credited her father with giving her "an absolute sense of style. I knew precisely how every fabric should look on me, whether it was a princess' gown or a washerwoman's rags." Thomsen was usually cast in roles as princesses, countesses, or artists.

In 1915, Thomsen married the Norwegian actor Thorleif Lund. She left Nordisk Film in 1917 to open a touring company in Norway with her husband. The company failed and Thomsen quickly returned to filmmaking. In the 1920s she appeared in a series of films for the Danish Astra Film Company under the direction of Fritz Magnussen. She returned to Nordisk for two final films and then retired from film in 1925. She performed on stage for the final time at the Dagmar Theater in 1930.

Thomsen returned to give one performance in a sound film when she appeared in the 1952 Alice O'Fredericks film Husmandstøsen at the age of 65. She died on 18 December 1973, aged 86.

== Filmography ==
- Den glade Løjtnant (Robert Dinesen, DK, 1912)
- Guvernørens Datter (August Blom, DK, 1912)
- Den sorte Kansler (August Blom, DK, 1912)
- Lynstraalen (Robert Dinesen, DK, 1912)
- Pro forma (ubekendt, DK, 1912)
- Strandingen i Vesterhavet (Eduard Schnedler-Sørensen, DK, 1912)
- Den Stærkeste (Eduard Schnedler-Sørensen, DK, 1912)
- Atlantis (August Blom, DK, 1913)
- Flugten gennem Luften (August Blom, DK, 1913)
- Pressens Magt (August Blom, DK, 1913)
- En Hofintrige (August Blom, DK, 1913)
- Strejken paa den gamle Fabrik (Robert Dinesen, DK, 1913)
- Fødselsdagsgaven (August Blom, DK, 1913)
- Hustruens Ret (Leo Tscherning, DK, 1913)
- Styrmandens sidste Fart (Eduard Schnedler-Sørensen, DK, 1913)
- Broder mod Broder (Robert Dinesen, DK, 1913)
- Døvstummelegatet (Robert Dinesen, DK, 1913)
- Guldmønten (August Blom, DK, 1913)
- Den tredie Magt (August Blom, DK, 1913)
- Under Blinkfyrets Straaler (Robert Dinesen, DK, 1913)
- Et Skud i Mørket (Eduard Schnedler-Sørensen, DK, 1913)
- Amors Krogveje (Robert Dinesen, DK, 1914)
- Et Kærlighedsoffer (Robert Dinesen, DK, 1914)
- Arbejdet adler (Robert Dinesen, DK, 1914)
- Den mystiske Fremmede (Holger-Madsen, DK, 1914)
- Gar el Hama III (Robert Dinesen, DK, 1914)
- Mit Fædreland, min Kærlighed (Robert Dinesen, DK, 1915)
- For Lykke og Ære (Robert Dinesen, DK, 1915)
- I Farens Stund (Robert Dinesen, DK, 1915)
- En Skæbne (Robert Dinesen, DK, 1915)
- En Opstandelse (Holger-Madsen, DK, 1915)
- Den sidste Nat (Robert Dinesen, DK, 1915)
- Kvinden han frelste (Robert Dinesen, DK, 1915)
- Zigøjnerblod (Robert Dinesen, DK, 1915)
- Om Kap med Døden (Robert Dinesen, DK, 1915)
- 500 Kroner inden Lørdag (Holger-Madsen, DK, 1915)
- Den frelsende Film (Holger-Madsen, DK, 1916)
- Verdens Undergang (August Blom, DK, 1916)
- Danserindens Hævn (Holger-Madsen, DK, 1916)
- Børnevennerne (Holger-Madsen, DK, 1916)
- Blandt Samfundets Fjender (Robert Dinesen, DK, 1916)
- Hendes Ungdomsforelskelse (Martinius Nielsen, DK, 1916)
- Lyset og Livet (Robert Dinesen, DK, 1916)
- En Skilsmisse (Martinius Nielsen, DK, 1916)
- Selskabsdamen (Martinius Nielsen, DK, 1916)
- Viljeløs Kærlighed (Hjalmar Davidsen, DK, 1916)
- Danserindens Kærlighedsdrøm (Holger-Madsen, DK, 1916)
- Det unge Blod (Holger-Madsen, DK, 1916)
- For sin Dreng (Robert Dinesen, Alexander Christian, DK, 1916)
- Det stjaalne Ansigt (Holger-Madsen, DK, 1916)
- Hotel Paradis (Robert Dinesen, DK, 1917)
- Naar Hjertet sælges (Martinius Nielsen, DK, 1917)
- Krigens Fjende (Holger-Madsen, DK, 1917)
- Lydia (Holger-Madsen, DK, 1918)
- Mands Vilje (Robert Dinesen, DK, 1918)
- Lykketyven (Martinius Nielsen, DK, 1918)
- Hans Kæreste (Hjalmar Davidsen, DK, 1918)
- De skraa Brædder (Robert Dinesen, DK, 1918)
- Lykken (Holger-Madsen, DK, 1918)
- Dømmer ikke (Fritz Magnussen, DK, 1918)
- Gøglerbandens Adoptivdatter (Robert Dinesen, DK, 1919)
- Den Æreløse (Holger-Madsen, DK, 1919)
- En Skuespillers Kærlighed (Martinius Nielsen, DK, 1920)
- Scenens Børn (Fritz Magnussen, DK, 1920)
- Lykkeper (Fritz Magnussen, DK, 1920)
- Munkens Fristelser (Fritz Magnussen, DK, 1921)
- Hendes Fortid (Fritz Magnussen, DK, 1921)
- Timeglasset (Fritz Magnussen, DK, 1922)
- Republikaneren (Martinius Nielsen, DK, 1923)
- Min Ven Privatdetektiven (A.W. Sandberg, DK, 1924)
- Det store Hjerte (August Blom, DK, 1925)
- Husmandstøsen (Alice O'Fredericks, DK, 1952)
