= Carl Herman Unthan =

Prussian handicarped violinist

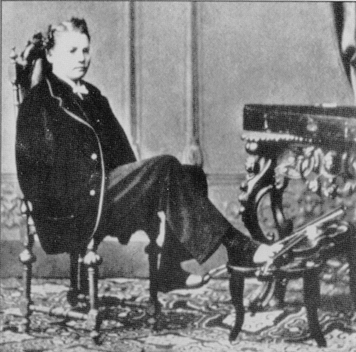
Carl Unthan playing the violin with his feet

Carl Herrmann Unthan (5 April 1848 – 19 November 1929) was a Prussian-born violinist who was born without arms.

== Biography ==
He was born on 5 April 1848 in Sommerfeld, East Prussia.

Unthan's father was a teacher who insisted he not be "coddled". Whether this was the reason or not, Carl reportedly could feed himself at two and around the age of ten is said to have taught himself to play the violin by strapping it on to a stool. He was sent to a music conservatory at 16 and graduated a couple of years later.

By the age of twenty Unthan was performing to full concert halls. He would go on to perform notably in Vienna with classical orchestras. He began with personal concerts and later added additional tricks to his repertoire. During his maiden performance he broke a string; he replaced it and tuned the new string using only his toes. After this it is said he would deliberately weaken one string before each performance so that it would snap during his recital, giving him an opportunity to repeat his dexterity. He was also a marksman who could shoot the spots out of a playing card with a rifle operated by his feet. He toured Cuba, Mexico, South America, and Europe. Later he married Antonie Neschta, with whom he had toured for a time. He moved to the United States and eventually gained citizenship.

During World War I, Unthan served in the German army by being sent to hospitals where he lectured soldiers who had lost their arms or hands, and spoke about how they could train their legs and feet to take over.

At the age of 65, Unthan (credited as Charles Unthan) appeared in the Danish silent film Atlantis which includes a passenger liner sinking during a voyage. The author of the original story, Gerhart Hauptmann, had been impressed by Unthan during a cross-Atlantic voyage and was inspired to write the character of Arthur Stoss, an armless virtuoso, based upon him. Hauptmann's contract with the Danish filmmakers stipulated that only Unthan could play the character.

His memoirs were published as The Armless Fiddler. He died in November 1929 in Berlin, Germany at the age of 81.

== Autobiography ==
In 1925, Unthan published his autobiography, Das Pediskript. Aufzeichnungen aus dem Leben eines Armlosen (The pediscript. Notes from the life of an armless man) in Germany, using pediscript rather than manuscript because he had typed it with his feet, pedally, as opposed to manually. It was published in English translation in 1935, six years after his death, as The Armless Fiddler, A Pediscript: Being the Life Story of a Vaudeville Man, the term vaudeville referencing Unthan's experience as a stage performer.

== Popular culture ==
There is an oblique reference to Unthan in the dialogue of Charles Chaplin's film Limelight, which takes place in the early twentieth century while Unthan was still performing.

Peter Sloterdijk, in his book You Must Change Your Life, discusses Unthan's commitment to what he terms an "ethics of the Nonetheless", which places him "undoubtedly" in "the earlier defiance-existentialist movement" of Germans such as Max Stirner in order to "...demonstrate the unusual convergence of human and cripple in the discourses of the generation after Nietzsche".
