= In Old California (1910 film) =

1910 film directed by D. W. Griffith

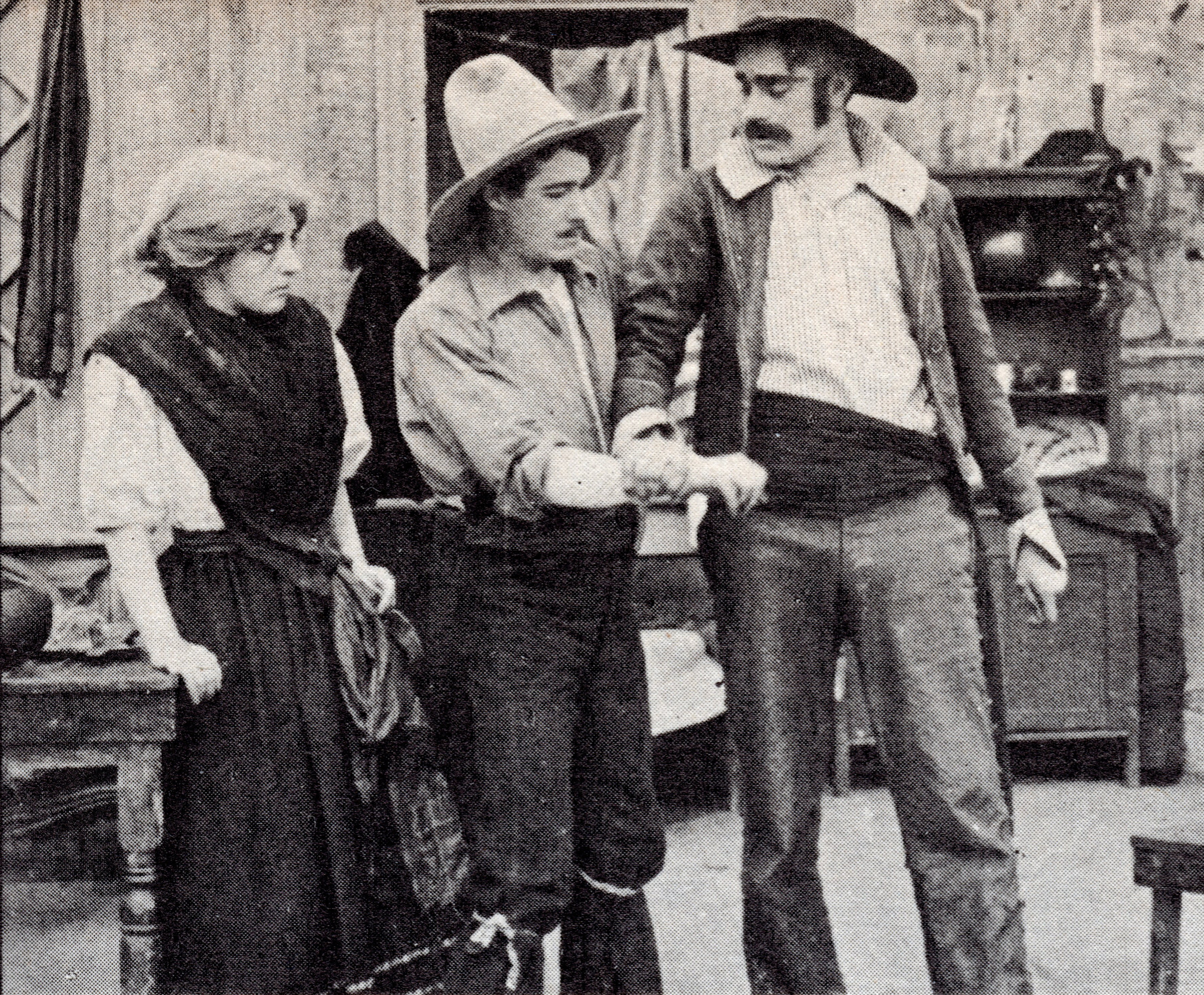
- Directed by: D. W. Griffith
- Written by: Stanner E.V. Taylor
- Starring: Frank Powell; Arthur V. Johnson; Marion Leonard; Henry B. Walthall
- Cinematography: G. W. Bitzer
- Distributed by: American Mutoscope and Biograph Company
- Release date: March 10, 1910
- Running time: 17 minutes
- Country: United States
- Language: Silent (English intertitles)

In Old California is a 1910 American silent Western film. It was the first film shot in Hollywood, California. It was directed by D. W. Griffith of the American Mutoscope and Biograph Company (then based in New York City). The film is a melodrama about the Mexican era of California.

== Background ==
Director D. W. Griffith discovered the village of Hollywood on his trips to California and decided to shoot there because of the scenery and friendly people. On May 6, 2004, a monument was erected at 1713 Vine Street, just north of Hollywood Boulevard. The monument was made by Hollywood Forever Cemetery, and the film, once thought lost, was screened at the Beverly Hills Film Festival. This was the first public screening in 94 years. The film was scheduled for restoration, with a restored version to be premiered at a later date.

For years, the first film thought to have been shot in Hollywood was Cecil B. DeMille's feature The Squaw Man (1914), which does hold the record as the first feature film made there. Griffith's film, however, was the first of any length shot in Hollywood.

== Plot ==
Before Mexican independence reached California in 1822, Perdita marries Pedro, a village troubadour, instead of Manuella, a wealthy Spaniard who steps aside upon learning her choice.

Twenty years later, Pedro is an alcoholic who spends her wages. Their 19-year-old son drinks and steals. Perdita writes to Manuella, now Governor, asking him to take the boy into the military. The boy is enlisted but is later caught robbing fellow soldiers. As Manuella reads a thank-you letter from Perdita, he chooses to discipline the boy privately.

Later, Perdita writes again. She is dying and asks to see her son, believing he has become an honorable soldier. Manuella dresses him in medals for the visit. After her death, the medals are removed and the boy is imprisoned.

== Cast ==
- Frank Powell
- Arthur V. Johnson
- Marion Leonard
- Henry B. Walthall

== See also ==
- List of American films of 1910
