= The White Slave Trade =

- E. Diedrich and S. Bille
- Directed by: August Blom
- Starring: Ellen Diedrich (dk); Svend Bille; Lauritz Olsen (dk); Einar Zangenberg (dk); Victor Fabian (dk)
- Cinematography: Axel Graatkjær as Axel Sørensen
- Distributed by: Nordisk Film
- Release date: 2 August 1910
- Running time: 45 minutes
- Country: Denmark
- Language: silent film

The White Slave Trade (Danish: Den hvide slavehandel) is a 1910 Danish silent drama film directed by August Blom. It is the only August Blom movie from 1910 that has been preserved. The film produced by Nordisk Films was the company's first feature film and became a major sales success, 103 copies being sold world-wide. However the film could not be released in the United States of America because of censorship. The film was a remake of an eponymous film by competing producer Fotorama, which is considered lost.

== Plot ==
Anna is a young girl from a poor but honorable home in Denmark. When her father finds in a newspaper an ad for a well-paid job as a company lady in a mansion in London, she goes to the interview in a Copenhagen hotel and is happy to get the job. Her childhood friend and now fiancé Georg is somewhat worried but Anna dismisses his distrust and travels to England. On arrival, to Anna's horror, she is taken into a luxury brothel. Anna manages to chase away her first customer, but cannot escape.

The brothel maid takes pity on poor Anna and smuggles out a letter to her parents, who seek help from the "Association for the White Slave Trade Fight". Georg travels to London and hires a detective. Together they track down the brothel where Anna is kept and arrange her evasion. Anna crawls out a window and they escape in horse-carriage, but after a wind-blowing car chase, they are overpowered by the slaveholders who get Anna back. She is then transported to the port to be sold to another country. When Georg and the detective, who have alerted Scotland Yard, arrive at the house, the maid tells them where she has been brought. Georg and the police manage to board the ship just before it leaves and after a brief but exciting fight Anna is finally freed and can return home.

== Cast ==

Ellen Diedrich (as Ellen Rindom) (dk) as Anna
Svend Bille as the customer at the brothel
Lauritz Olsen (dk) as Georg
Einar Zangenberg (dk)
Victor Fabian (dk) as The Detective
Ella la Cour (dk) as the madam of the brothel
Otto Lagoni (dk)as Anna's father
Julie Henriksen (dk) as Anna's mother

== Production and reception ==
In 1910, filmmaker Ole Olsen, who had established in 1910 Nordisk Films Kompagni, the oldest Danish film production, hired actor August Blom as its new Head of Production. Between 1910 and 1925, he directed more than 100 films and started a new genre, the erotic melodrama. The White Slave Trade was his third film and it was a remake a film with the same title released in the Spring of 1910 by Nordisk Film's main competitor: Fotorama. That film was the first multi-reel film in Denmark and one of the first in the world, and its duration of 40 minutes as well as the fact that it showed life inside a brothel, made it a resounding success. It was stressed at the time that the longer visual form did not inhibit comprehension, but aided it instead. A reviewer marveled that it was "The first artistic film. As a guide, the printed programme is unnecessary, the rapidly shifting but carefully linked episodes speak for themselves".

To bank on this success, Olsen asked Blom to watch carefully the Fotorama film and to make a scene-by-scene re-creation of it. This was done, except for a few roles that got a name change. Nordisk did not hide its plagiarism, boasting that the film was executed exactly in the same way as the Fotorama film, but performed by better artists. This was not illegal because the Danish law on copyright did not cover films at the time.

When Nordisk, in line with it usual practice, decided to distribute the film outside of Denmark, notably in Germany, he faced initially the reluctance of German distributors to present a film with of such a long duration, the standard for films being at the time one reel of about 15 minutes. Ole Olsen threatened a Hamburg cinema owner to stop supplying any Nordisk production to him if he did not program The White Slave Trade. According to Olsen, the result was an unprecedented success. "The next day the cinema was packed and on the third day, it took twenty police officers to retain order since people were queuing around the block to get tickets." 103 copies were sold worldwide in comparison to a 1910 average of 40 copies per film. In the United States however, the film could not be released as it was forbidden by censorships boards. Apparently the censors, shocked by the brothel scenes, were not convinced by the argument that the film exalted the innocence of the heroine and that white slavery had the power of metaphor "to reduce the complex problem of prostitution to a simple story of villain and victim."

Given the success of the film, Nordisk produced two sequels, Den hvide slavehandel II (In the Hands of Impostors) in 1911 and Den hvide slavehandel III (The White Slave Trade III) in 1912.
