= Olaf Fønss =

Danish actor (1882–1949)

- Olaf Fønss
- Born: Olaf Holger Axel Fønss; 17 October 1882; Århus, Denmark
- Died: 11 March 1949 (aged 66); Copenhagen, Denmark
- Occupations: Actor, Director, Producer; Film Censor; Union Leader
- Years active: 1903–1947
- Spouses: Thilda Elisabeth Lilja Johnsen; Else Dorthea Bast
- Relatives: Aage Fønss (brother), Johannes Fønss (brother), Jorgen Fønss (Nephew)

Olaf Holger Axel Fønss (17 October 1882 – 11 March 1949) was a Danish actor, director, producer, film censor and one of Denmark and Germany's biggest stars of the silent film era.

== Career ==
Fønss' leading role in the 1913 Danish classic Atlantis made his face recognizable to movie fans. It was his role as the artificial creature in the 1916 German science fiction film series, Homunculus, that earned Fønss status as a top matinee idol. In the 1930s, Fønss became politically active by directing two films for Denmark's Socialdemokratiske Parti (Social Democracy Party), Den Store Dag (1930) and Under Den Gamle Fane (1932). He was president of the Danish Actor's Union from 1933–1947 and was a censor for the National Film Censor of Denmark for 14 years. Fønss was the older brother of actors Johannes and Aage Fønss.

He was the recipient of voluminous fan mail, which was the subject of 2024 research.

== Filmography ==
=== As actor ===
- Vask, videnskab og velvære (1932)
- Die seltsame Vergangenheit der Thea Carter (1929) ... a.k.a. The Unusual Past of Thea Carter (International: English title)
- Ich lebe für Dich (1929) ... a.k.a. Triumph of Love (USA)
- Die Waise von Lowood (1926) ... a.k.a. Orphan of Lowood (International: English title)
- Lace (1926)
- Vajsenhusbarn (1926)
- Fra Piazza del Popolo (1925)... a.k.a. 'Mists of the Past (UK)
- Das Unbekannte Morgen (1923) ... a.k.a. The Unknown Tomorrow
- Das Indische Grabmal: Die Sendung des Yoghi (1921) ... a.k.a. The Indian Tomb: Part I, the Mission of the Yogi (USA: video title)
- A Debt of Honour (1921)
- Der Gang in die Nacht (1921) ... a.k.a. The Dark Road (USA)
- Elskovs Magt (1921)
- Hendes Fortid (1921)
- Das Indische Grabmal: Der Tiger von Eschnapur (1921) ... a.k.a. The Indian Tomb: Part II, the Tiger of Bengal (USA: video title)
- Munkens Fristelser (1921)
- Bajadser (1919)
- Præsten fra Havet (1918)
- Dommens dag (1918)
- Hævneren (1918)
- Lægen (1918)
- Fangen fra Erie County (1918)
- Gengældelsens Ret (1917)
- Selskabsdamen (1916)
- Verdens Undergang (1916) ... a.k.a. The End of the World (USA)
- Gentlemansekretæren (1916)
- Syndens datter (1916)
- Hendes ungdomsforelskelse (1916)
- Homunculus -- film series 1 through six (1916)
- Cowboymillionæren (1915)
- Lille Teddy (1915)
- Den Hvide Rytterske (1915)
- Ned Med Vaabnene (1914) ... a.k.a. Down with Weapons (USA)
- Af Elskovs Naade (1914)
- En Stærkere Magt (1914)
- Atlantis (1913)
- Under Mindernes Træ (1913)
- Zigeurnerorkestret (1912)
- Bryggerens Datter (1912) ... a.k.a. The Brewer's Daughter (literal English title)
- Dødsridtet (1912)

=== As director ===
- Hævneren (1919)
- Samvittighedskvaler (1920)
- B.T.'s amatørfilm (1923)
- Den store Dag (1930)
- Under den gamle Fane (1932)
