= Harriet Bloch =

Danish writer and screenwriter

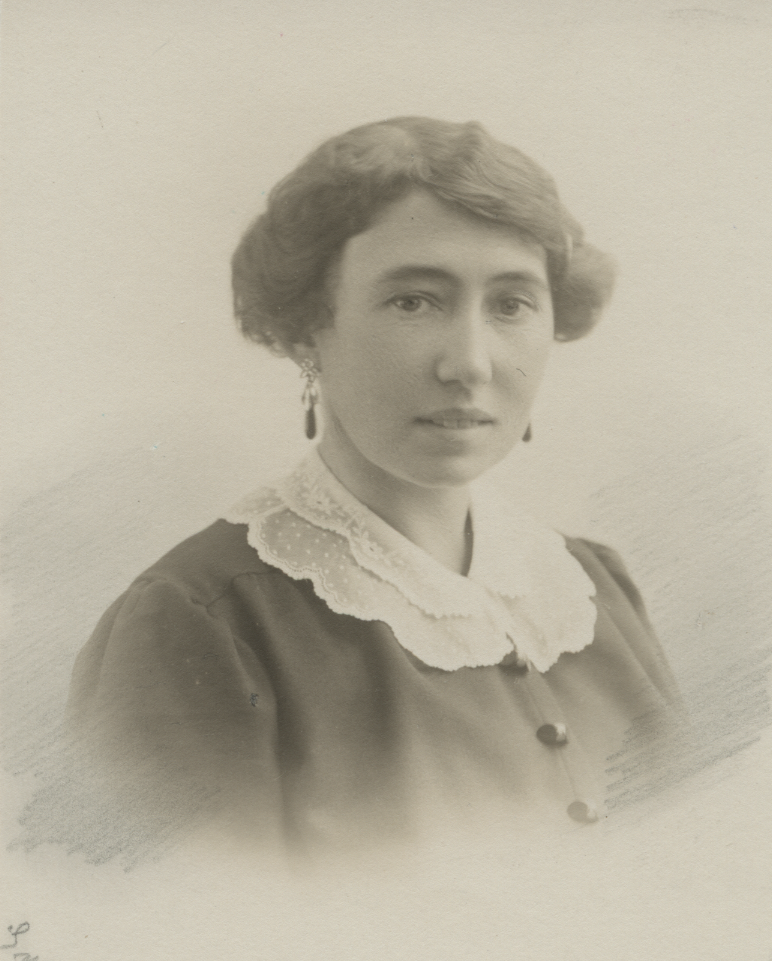
- Bloch in c. 1915
- Born: 26 July 1881; Denmark
- Died: 1 April 1975 (aged 93)
- Occupation: Screenwriter

Harriet Bloch (1881-1975) was a Danish screenwriter who worked in the industry during the silent era. During her career, she wrote over 100 screenplays, some of which were never produced. Her scripts were made into films in Denmark, Germany, Sweden, and beyond.

== Selected filmography ==
- 1923 Tatjana
- 1923 Republikaneren
- 1921 Die Erbin von Tordis
- 1920 Kærlighed og Overtro (Short)
- 1920 En hustru till låns (Short)
- 1920 Frøken Larsens Karriere (Short)
- 1918 Frøken Theodor (Short)
- 1918 Hendes Hjertes Ridder
- 1918 Præstens Datter
- 1918 Hjerterkonge (Short)
- 1918 Prøvens Dag
- 1918 Pigespejderen (Short)
- 1918 Den lille Virtuos (Short)
- 1917 De tossede Kvindfolk (Short)
- 1917 Et barnehjerte
- 1917 The Suburban Vicar
- 1917 Miljonarvet (Short)
- 1917 Tropernes Datter
- 1917 Askepot (Short)
- 1917 Kærligheds-Væddemaalet
- 1916 For sin faders skyld
- 1916 Danserindens hævn
- 1916 Manden uden fremtid
- 1916 Kärlek och journalistik (Short)
- 1916 Prinsessens Hjerte
- 1916 Letsindighedens Løn
- 1916 En kærlighedsprøve
- 1916 Hendes fortid
- 1916 Viljeløs Kærlighed
- 1916 Ålderdom och dårskap (Short)
- 1915 A Woman's Honor
- 1915 Den lille Chauffør (Short)
- 1915 Et huskors
- 1915 En søvnig Brudgom (Short)
- 1915 Lige for lige (Short)
- 1915 Den sidste Nat
- 1915 De Ægtemænd!
- 1915 Badehotellet
- 1914 Man skal ikke skue Hunden paa Haarene (Short)
- 1914 Et Læreaar
- 1914 Hægt mig i Ryggen (Short)
- 1914 En stærkere magt
- 1914 Den store Middag (Short)
- 1914 Under falsk Flag (Short)
- 1913 Livets blændværk (Short) (writer)
- 1913 Nelly's Forlovelse
- 1913 The Girl Graduate (Short)
- 1913 Et skud i mørket (Short)
- 1913 Outwitted (Short) (writer)
- 1912 Pro forma (Short)
- 1912 When Love Dies
- 1911 Hendes Ære (Short)
- 1911 Thru Trials to Victory
