= Benjamin Christensen =

Danish film director, writer and actor (1879-1959)

- Benjamin Christensen during filming, c. 1940
- Born: 28 September 1879; Viborg, Denmark
- Died: 2 April 1959 (aged 79); Copenhagen, Denmark
- Occupations: Director, actor
- Years active: 1911–1942

Benjamin Christensen Danish: [ˈpɛnjamin ˈkʁɛsdn̩sn̩] (28 September 1879 – 1 April 1959) was a Danish film director, screenwriter and actor. A leading director of Danish silent cinema, he is best known for Häxan (1922), which combines documentary exposition with dramatized scenes of witchcraft and persecution. Film curator Charles Silver credited Christensen’s early lighting techniques with influencing German Expressionist cinema.

Christensen began as a stage performer. He made his directing debut with the Danish spy melodrama The Mysterious X (1914). In Germany, he played the painter Claude Zoret in Carl Theodor Dreyer’s Michael (1924). He went on to direct The Devil’s Circus (1926) for Metro-Goldwyn-Mayer and Seven Footprints to Satan (1929) for First National (which was controlled by Warner Brothers) before returning to Denmark. There Christensen resumed directing with the sound film Children of Divorce (1939).

Häxan faced censorship on its original release and reached new audiences through later reissues. Robert Eggers cited it as a visual reference for The Witch (2015), and the makers of The Blair Witch Project named their production company Haxan Films after it.

== Biography ==
Benjamin Christensen was born in Viborg, Denmark as the youngest of the twelve children. He initially studied medicine, but got interested in acting and began studies at the Det Kongelige Teater (Royal Danish Theatre) in Copenhagen in 1901. Christensen's professional acting career began in Aarhus in 1907, but soon abandoned the stage in order to become a wine salesman.

In 1911, Christensen made his debut as a film actor. All of his pre-directorial efforts were lost, including Scenens børn (1913), the only motion picture directed by eminent Norwegian playwright and stage director Bjørn Bjørnson.

In 1913, Christensen assumed control of the small, Hellborg-based production company for which he worked, and reorganized it as Dansk-Biograf Kompagnie, making a directorial debut with Det hemmelighedsfulde X (The Mysterious X, 1914), a spy melodrama, with camerawork, cutting, and art direction that was considered revolutionary for the period. Christensen himself played the main role, as in his second film, Hævnens nat (Blind Justice, 1916), portraying a man wrongly accused of murder. Despite the success of his first two films, Christensen did not find acceptance within the Danish film industry, and after Blind Justice, he returned to the stage.

Häxan (1922)

Between 1918 and 1921, Christensen researched the history of necromancy as background for his next and greatest film, Häxan (The Witches, or Witchcraft Through the Ages, 1922). Christensen appeared in the film in the role of Satan. A plotless panorama of the history of witchcraft, Häxan utilized visual nudity, gore, and shock value on a level that remains unusual for a silent film.

Despite heavy criticism from censor boards, Häxan was an international success. Based on the response to Häxan, Christensen received an invitation from UFA to direct in Germany. He made two films for them, though his most memorable work in Germany was as an actor in the key supporting role of the painter Claude Zoret in his fellow countryman Carl Theodor Dreyer's film Michael (1924). This would prove Christensen's last film appearance as an actor.

In 1924, MGM swept through the talent pool at UFA and picked up, among others, Christensen, who departed so quickly that he may not have completed his second feature, Die Frau mit dem schlechten Ruf (The Woman of Ill-Repute, 1925). The film was not released until the end of 1925, by which time Christensen had already disowned the film. Christensen got off a good start with the Norma Shearer vehicle The Devil's Circus (1926), a commercial success. But the Lon Chaney picture Mockery (1927) which followed was a scandalous failure critically, even though it still generated a modest profit.

When work stalled in 1927 on MGM's troubled, three-years-long production of The Mysterious Island (1929), Christensen was let go. He moved to Warner Brothers, where he made four films. The first was The Hawk's Nest (1928), a crime drama starring Milton Sills. The remaining three constitute a horror trilogy and were co-written with Cornell Woolrich: The Haunted House (1928), Seven Footprints to Satan (1929) and House of Horror (1929). By this time, Christensen had had enough of Hollywood experience and, although House of Horror was a hit, after it wrapped up, he went back to Denmark.

Afterward, Christensen returned once again to stage direction and did not make another film for a decade. Breaking his silence, for the Nordisk Company, he wrote and directed Skilsmissens børn (Children of Divorce, 1939), a social melodrama about generation gap. It was a surprise hit, and Christensen seemed back on track again. He followed it with Barnet (The Child, 1940) – a film about abortion – and Gå med mig hjem (Come Home with Me, 1941) which reunited him with actress Bodil Ipsen, who had appeared alongside him in the Bjørnson film and was a director herself.

However, Damen med de lyse Handsker (The Lady with the Light Gloves, 1942) was a spy thriller that proved an unmitigated disaster on the level of Mockery, and Christensen found himself out of the film business for good. Afterward, he assumed management of a movie theater in a suburb of Copenhagen and lived out the rest of his 79 years in obscurity.

== Legacy ==
Häxan is Christensen's best-known film. Long circulating in the 16mm market, it was re-edited into a shorter version in 1967 by a British film maker Antony Balch with an added jazz score and narration by William S. Burroughs. As such, the film became a counter-culture favorite. A version restored to its original length and in superior picture quality was released by the Criterion Collection in 2001. The Mysterious X was first revived at MOMA in 1966 and has become his second-best known film. It was combined with Blind Justice and released on a DVD by the Danish Film Institute in 2004.

For the remainder of Christensen's output, the losses were heavy and it has long been difficult to see. Based on what exists, some critics have concluded that all of Christensen's American films were artistic failures. Of the German films, only the first one – Seine Frau, die Unbekannte (His Wife, The Unknown, 1923) – has survived, and of his Warner Brothers films, only a poor Italian print of Seven Footprints to Satan has surfaced, although sound discs exist of House of Horror. Critical opinions about The Devil's Circus seem divided; Mockery was one of the most sought after of all lost films until it was finally located in the 1970s. However, many who have seen it have stated that it is easily the worst of Lon Chaney's MGM features. The Nordisk films remain little seen outside Denmark.

In 1999, the Museum of Modern Art, and later the Pacific Film Archive in Berkeley, held the first retrospective screening of Christensen's work under the rubric Benjamin Christensen: An International Dane. Of Christensen, Carl Theodor Dreyer once described him as "a man who knew exactly what he wanted and who pursued his goal with uncompromising stubbornness." After many decades of relative obscurity, Christensen is now considered one of the best Danish silent film directors in history.

== Partial filmography ==
- The Mysterious X (1914)
- Blind Justice (1916)
- Häxan (1922) aka Witchcraft Through the Ages
- Seine Frau, die Unbekannte (1923)
- The Woman Who Did (1925)
- The Devil's Circus (1926)
- Mockery (1927)
- The Hawk's Nest (1928)
- The Haunted House (1928)
- Seven Footprints to Satan (1929)
- House of Horror (1929)
- The Mysterious Island (1929) partial sound
- Children of Divorce (1939)
- The Child (1940)
- Come Home with Me (1941)
- Lady with the Light Gloves (1942)

== Sources ==
- Kendrick, James (13 October 2003). "A witches' brew of fact, fiction and spectacle". Kinoeye 3 (11).
