= Carl Lauritzen =

Danish actor

- Born: 4 April 1879; Copenhagen, Denmark
- Died: 18 April 1940 (aged 61)

Carl Lauritzen (4 April 1879 – 18 April 1940) was a Danish actor. He appeared in films between 1911 and 1922.
