= August Blom =

Danish filmmaker (1869–1947)

- Born: 26 December 1869; Copenhagen, Denmark
- Died: 10 January 1947 (aged 77); Copenhagen, Denmark
- Occupations: Actor, Director, Studio Leader
- Years active: 1893–1924

August Blom (26 December 1869 – 10 January 1947) was a Danish film director, producer, and pioneer of silent films during the "golden age" of Danish filmmaking from 1910 to 1914.

== Career ==
Blom began his acting career in 1893 in Kolding, and was employed as a company actor for the Folketeatret from 1907 to 1910. During that period, Blom also began performing in films for the Nordisk Film Kompangni. He debuted there as a director in 1910 with his film Livets Storme (Storms of Life). That same year he was made the Head of Production for Nordisk Film and given the title of Director. Blom was a prolific filmmaker and during the golden age of Danish silent films, 1910 to 1914, he directed 78 movies. Before he retired from Nordisk Film and filmmaking in 1925, Blom directed more than 100 titles. Blom's volume of work is the largest of any Danish film director.

Blom is credited as a pioneer in silent filmmaking. In 1911, Blom was instrumental in the development of the erotic melodrama with his film Ved Faengslets Port, the story of a young man in debt to a moneylender while in love with the moneylender's daughter. Blom refined this genre during the following years, and this became the most profitable trademark for Nordisk company films. Blom also is credited with developing the use of cross-cutting as well as using mirrors to expand the drama. In 1913, Blom made his most ambitious effort: the film Atlantis based on the 1912 novel by Gerhart Hauptmann. The film, which depicted the sinking of an ocean liner only one year after the sinking the RMS Titanic, drew an enormous public response. With a complicated plot and several main characters, Atlantis became the first multi-reel feature film from Denmark. Harald Engberg of the Politiken newspaper later wrote in an obituary that Blom "knew that he wasn't some directorial genius, but he proved that he was the cleverest and most tasteful scene creator of his day."

Blom retired from filmmaking in 1924. He opened the Kinografen movie theater (later renamed the Bristol Theater) and managed the theater from 1934 to 1947.

== Personal life ==
August Blom was born on 26 December 1869 in Copenhagen, Denmark.

Blom was first married at the age of 39 in 1908 to Agnete von Prangen. After they divorced, he married a second time in 1917 to the actress Johanne Fritz-Petersen, the widow of Theater Director Fritz Petersen. He died on 10 January 1947, aged 77.

== Filmography ==
=== Pre war years ===
1910

- Livets Storme (Storms of Life)
- Robinson Crusoe
- Den hvide Slavehandel (The White Slave Trade)
- Spinonen fra Tokio (The Red Light)
- Den skaebnesvangre Opfindelse (Dr. Jekyll and Mr. Hyde)
- Jagten paa Gentlemanrøveren (Hunt for the Gentleman Thief)
- Singaree
- Spøgelset i Gravkaelderen (The Ghost of the Variety)
- Den dø des Halsbaand (The Necklace of the Dead)

1911

- Hamlet
- Den hvide Slavehandel II (In the Hands of Impostors)
- Den farlige Alder (The Price of Beauty)
- Ved Faengslets Port (Temptations of a Great City)
- Vildledt Elskov (The Bank Book)
- Potifars Hustru (The Victim of a Character)
- Politimesteren (Convicts No. 10 and No. 13)
- Den blaa Natviol (The Daughter of the Fortune Teller)
- Damernes Blad (The Ladies' Journal)
- Balletdanserinden (The Ballet Dancer)
- Jernbanens Datter (The Daughter of the Railway)
- Den naadige Frøken (Lady Mary's Love)
- En Lektion (Aviatikeren og Journalistens Hustru; The Aviator and the Journalist's Wife)
- Ekspeditricen (Ungdom og Letsind; In the Prime of Life)
- Desdemona (?)
- Fader og Søn (?)
- Dødsdrømmen (A Dream of Death)
- Min første Monocle (His First Monocle)
- Fru Potifar (Den skaebnesvangre Løgn; A Fatal Lie)
- Kaerlighedens Styrke (The Power of Love)
- Mormonens offer (A Victim of the Mormons)
- Haevnet (Det bødes der for; Vengeance)
- Det mørke Punkt (Mamie Rose; Annie Bell)
- Eventyr paa Fodrejsen (Den udbrudte Slave; The Two Convicts)
- Ungdommens Ret (The Right of Youth)
- Tropisk Kaerlighed (Love in the Tropics)
- Vampyrdanserinden (The Vampire Dancer)
- Det gamle Købmandshus (Midsommer; Midsummer-Time)
- Dødens Brud Gadeoriginalen (A Bride of Death)

1912

- En Opfinders Skaebne (The Aeroplane Inventor)
- Onkel og Nevø (A Poisonous Love)
- Brillantstjernen (For Her Sister's Sake)
- Guvernørens Datter (The Governor's Daughter)
- Kaerlighed gør blind (Love Is Blind)
- Dyrekøbt Venskab (Dearly Purchased Friendship)
- Den sorte Kansler (The Black Chancellor)
- Hjertets Guld (Et Hjerte af Guld; Faithful unto Death)
- Direktørens Datter (Caught in His Own Trap)
- Det første Honorar (Hans første Honorar; His First Patient)
- Elskovs Magt (Gøgleren; Man's Great Adversary)
- Historien om en Moder (En Moders Kaerlighed; The Life of a Mother)
- De tre Kammerater (The Three Comrades)
- Operabranden (Bedstemoders Vuggevise) The Song Which Grandmother Sang
- Den første Kaerlighed (Her First Love Affair)
- Hjerternes Kamp (A High Stake)
- Hans vanskeligste Rolle (His Most Difficult Part)
- Den tredie Magt (The Secret Treaty)
- Fodselsdagsgaven (Gaven; The Birthday Gift)
- En Hofintrige (A Court Intrigue)
- Den sande Kaerlighed (Flugten gennem Skyerne; The Fugitives)
- Hvem var Forbryderen? (Samvittighedsnag; At the Eleventh Hour)
- Alt paa ét Kort (Guldmønten; Gold from the Gutter)

1913

- Pressens Magt (Et Bankrun; A Harvest of Tears)
- Troløs (Gøglerblod, Artists)
- Højt Spil (Et forfejlet Spring; A Dash for Liberty)
- Naar Fruen gaar paa Eventyr (Pompadourtasken; The Lost Bag)
- Bristet Lykke (A Paradise Lost)
- Fem Kopier (Five Copies)
- Atlantis
- En farlig Forbryder (Knivstikkeren; A Modern Jack the Ripper)
- Af Elskovs Naade (Acquitted)
- Elskovsleg (Love's Devotee)
- Vasens Hemmelighed (Den kinesiske Vase; The Chinese Vase)

=== Years 1914–1918 ===
Note: Denmark during World War I was neutral

1914

- Sønnen (Her Son)
- Den store Middag (The Guestless Dinner Party)
- Tugthusfange No. 97 (En Gaest fra en anden Verden; The Outcast's Return)
- Faedrenes Synd (Nemesis)
- Aegteskab og Pigesjov (Mr. King paa Eventyr; A Surprise Packet)
- Aeventyrersken (Exiled)
- En ensom Kvinde (Hvem er han?; The Doctor's Legacy)
- Revolutionsbryllup (A Revolution Marriage)
- Et Laereaar (The Reformation)
- Den lille Chauffør (The Little Chauffeur)
- Den største Kaerlighed (En Moders Kaerlighed; "Escaped the Law, But . . . ")
- Pro Patria
- Kaerligheds-Vaeddemaalet (The Wager)

1915

- Du skal elske din Naeste (For de Andre; The Samaritan)
- Giftpilen (The Poisonous Arrow)
- Hjertestorme
- Kaerligheds Laengsel (Den Pukkelryggede; The Cripple Girl)
- Lotteriseddel No. 22152 (Den blinde Skaebne; Blind Fate)
- Syndig Kaerlighed (Eremitten; The Hermit)
- For sit Lands Aere (For His Country's Honor)

1916

- Truet Lykke (Et Skud i Mørket; The Evil Genius) (Flammesvaerdet; The Flaming Sword) (?)
- Rovedderkoppen (Den røde Enke) (?)
- Syndens Datter (Nobody's Daughter)
- Den mystiske Selskabsdame (The Mysterious Companion)
- Gillekop
- Verdens Undergang (The End of the World)

1918

- Grevindens Aere (Kniplinger; Lace)
- Maharadjaens Yndlingshustru II (The Favorite Wife of the Maharaja II; A Daughter of Brahma)
- Via Crucis

=== Later years ===
1919

- Prometheus (Bonds of Hate)

1920

- Hans gode Genius (His Guardian Angel)
- Praesten i Vejlby (The Vicar of Vejlby)

1924

- Det store Hjerte (Lights from Circus Life; Side Lights of the Sawdust Ring)
- Den store Magt

1925

- Hendes Naade
- Dragonen
