= Little Dorrit (disambiguation) =

Little Dorrit is a novel by Charles Dickens originally published in installments between 1855 and 1857.

Little Dorrit may also refer to:

- Little Dorrit (1920 film), a silent film version
- Little Dorrit (1924 film), a 1924 Danish silent historical drama film
- Little Dorrit (1934 film), a German adaptation
- Little Dorrit (1987 film), a 1987 film based on that novel
- Little Dorrit (TV series), a 2008 BBC/WGBH television serial based on the novel
- Little Dorrit, a cultivar of Lobularia maritima, commonly known as sweet alyssum
