= Margarethe von Sydow =

German writer (1869–1945)

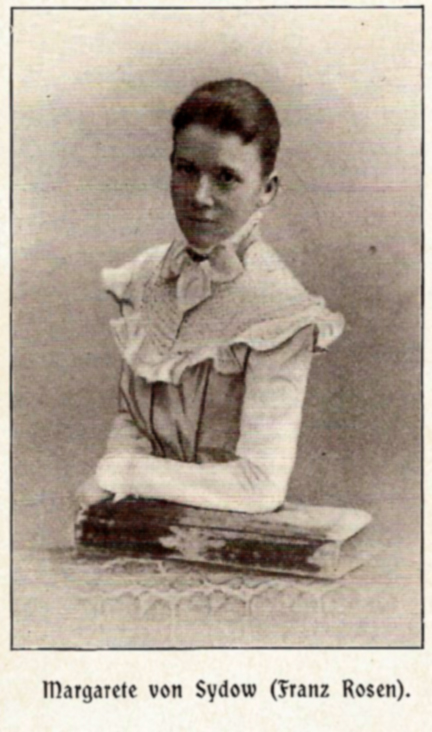
Margarethe von Sydow, née von Weiß

Margarethe von Sydow (born Karoline Franziska Margarethe von Weiß; pseudonym: Franz Rosen), December 16, 1869 - February 20, 1945, was a German writer.

== Life and career ==
Margarethe von Sydow was born in Berlin on December 16, 1869, and grew up in the countryside. Her father was the district administrator, Dr. jur. Oskar von Weiß and his first wife Anna von Flemming (September 1, 1839 - May 24, 1871). From her father's second marriage, she had two stepsisters, Elisabeth and Maria.

In 1890, Margarethe married the landowner Konrad von Sydow, who later became a district administrator. The couple lived on Sydow's estate, Stolzenfelde, near Schönfließ (Neumark). Alongside her duties as a housewife and mother, Margarethe began writing. Until the First World War, she published a number of novels and short stories, mostly under the pseudonym Franz Rosen, some of which were reprinted into the 1920s. She donated the financial proceeds from her writing to charity. She adhered to traditional methods and did not participate in the development of modern writing. In her novels, she strove to explore the inner lives of people and the psychological development of her characters.

"The author, who has already proven herself a skilled storyteller through several novels, takes a forceful stance here on Karin Michaelis' sensational work, The Dangerous Age. She says the book outraged her and, on the other hand, forced her to reflect. 'It seemed to me a duty to my gender to respond to the claims made by Karin Michaelis. Just as she does, I too have the right to proclaim the truths that life has taught me.' And in accordance with this principle, a German woman creates a counterpart to the Danish author's book, featuring the same characters and circumstances, but from a different worldview, in order to expose the exaggerated and pathological aspects of Karin Michaelis's work as absurd. This grippingly written book will be of interest to anyone who has grappled with the question of The Dangerous Age.'" – Review of her book When Mature Women Love in the Grazer Tagblatt (1913)

== Works ==
- The Forum of the World, Dresden [et al.] 1897 (under the name Franz Rosen)
- From the Book of Dreams, Dresden [et al.] 1898
- Chronicle of Suffering, Dresden: E. Pierson 1899 (under the name Franz Rosen). Digitized version on Hathitrust.
- Secrets, Dresden [et al.] 1899 (under the name Franz Rosen)
- Inclination and Duty, Dresden [et al.] 1900 (under the name Franz Rosen)
- The Patroness, Dresden [et al.] (under the name Franz Rosen)
- The Monk of Sanct Blasien, Dresden [et al.] 1901 (under the name Franz Rosen)
- Sachsenehre, Dresden 1901 (under the name Franz Rosen)
- Svante Ohlsen, Stuttgart 1901 (under the name Franz Rosen)
- Extinguished Light, Dresden [et al.] 1902 (under the name Franz Rosen) Velhagen & Klasings Roman-Bibliothek 11.1900/01, pp. 105–306. Digitized version on the Internet Archive
- Virgin Queen, Bielefeld [et al.] 1902 (under the name Franz Rosen)
- The Little One, Berlin 1902 (under the name Franz Rosen)
- Anna Steinhofer, Leipzig 1904
- Deliver us from everyday life, Stuttgart [et al.] 1904 (under the name Franz Rosen)
- Last Rest, Stuttgart 1904 (under the name Franz Rosen)
- Man's Prerogative, Dresden 1904 (under the name Franz Rosen)
- The Wages of Sin, Stuttgart 1904 (under the name Franz Rosen)
- Hinrik Gehrts, Stuttgart 1906 (under the name Franz Rosen)
- A Struggle for Existence, Berlin 1907 (under the name Franz Rosen)
- The Children of Köbinghof, Dresden 1909 (under the name Franz Rosen)
- A Great Man's Love, Berlin 1910 (under the name Franz Rosen)
  - 7th edition, 1921. Digitized version available on Hathitrust.
- When Mature Women Love, Berlin 1912
- The Great Labyrinth, Berlin 1913 (under the name Franz Rosen)
- The Wild Yellow Poppy, Berlin 1914 (under the name Franz Rosen)
- Kraft, Berlin 1918 (under the name Franz Rosen)
- A Little Book About Waiting, Berlin 1921 (under the name Franz Rosen)
- The Land That Shines in the Distance, Bleicherode 1937
