= Blind Justice (1916 film) =

1916 film

- Directed by: Benjamin Christensen
- Written by: Benjamin Christensen
- Starring: Benjamin Christensen
- Cinematography: Johan Ankerstjerne
- Release date: 25 September 1916
- Running time: 100 minutes
- Country: Denmark
- Language: Silent

Blind Justice (Danish: Hævnens nat, literally Revenge Night) is a 1916 Danish silent drama film directed by Benjamin Christensen. Prints of the film exist in the Det Danske Filminstitut.

== Plot ==
During a New Year's Eve party at the wealthy Ranton Manor, an escaped convict named "Strong" John Sikes trudges through the snow with his infant son. John breaks into the Ranton household and enters the room of Ann, the daughter of the family. He finds a jewelry box decorated with her name. It contains a pearl necklace, but he doesn't take it.

The Ranton family and their guests are informed that John has escaped from prison and is wanted for murder. The partygoers gather weapons to hunt for the criminal, to Ann's disapproval. When she returns to her room, John begs her to not tell anyone he is there and to give him milk for his son. She agrees, but is caught in the kitchen by the partygoers. They use Ann to lure John into a citizen's arrest. Enraged, he blames Ann and vows to "tie a rope around her neck" when he eventually gets out of prison.

Fourteen years later, Ann is married to Dr. Richard West and they are the parents of fifteen-year-old adopted son Bob and two-year-old biological daughter Annie. John is released from prison, now a broken man in a semi-fugue state who has forgotten his threats against Ann. At a circus, elephant trainer Prof. Wilkens reads about John's release and is nervous to learn the police now doubt John's guilt.

John tries to reclaim his son from the orphanage, but is told that the boy was confidentially adopted and is given no further information. Despondent, John wanders the streets until he meets an old friend from the prison carpentry shop. The old friend takes John to the headquarters of ironically nicknamed gangster "Slim" Sam Morton.

At the circus, Wilkens suffers a nervous breakdown and falls down a flight of stairs. On his death bed, he confesses to the murder for which John was blamed.

After the Wests leave their townhouse to vacation at their country house, Morton's gang robs the empty residence. John is brought along, although he does not initially comprehend the group's mission. John discovers Ann's jewelry box among the stolen goods and remembers his vow of revenge.

In the middle of the night, John calls in a fake medical emergency to trick Dr. West into leaving his family. Ann realizes that her husband forgot the key to his instrument case and sends Bob after him. When Dr. West arrives at the fake emergency, John ties him up. Bob arrives soon after, and John locks the boy in a cupboard and then leaves. However, Bob and his father manage to get ahold of the telephone and call the police.

John arrives at the country house and chases Ann. She manages to hide, but is forced to reveal herself to stop him from harming Annie. As he attempts to kill Ann, the police arrive and shoot John. The next day, he's cleared of murder and it's revealed that Bob is his son. John dies peacefully in bed while the West family sits beside him.

== Cast ==
- Benjamin Christensen as Strong John Henry Sikes (English version) / Stærke Henry (Danish version). He is credited as Benjamin Christie in the US version.
- Karen Caspersen as Ann. She is credited as Karen Sandberg in the Danish version and Katherine Sanders in the US version.
- Peter Fjelstrup as Dr. Richard "Dick" West (US version)
- Charles Wilken as Prof. Wilken, an elephant trainer
- Ulla Johansen
- Jon Iversen
- Aage Schmidt
- Mathilde Nielsen
- Carl Gottschalksen
- Grethe Brandes
- Elith Pio
