= Den farlige alder =

1911 film

- Directed by: August Blom
- Screenplay by: Karin Michaëlis
- Based on: The Dangerous Age: Letters and Fragments from a Woman's Diary
- Cinematography: Axel Graatkjær
- Distributed by: Nordisk Films
- Release date: 7 April 1911
- Country: Denmark
- Language: Danish

Den farlige alder (1911)

Den farlige alder is a 1911 Danish silent film directed by August Blom which was released internationally as The Price of Beauty. It was produced under the Nordisk Films banner.

The film was adapted by Karin Michaëlis' from her novel of the same name, which was published in English as The Dangerous Age: Letters and Fragments from a Woman's Diary. It focuses on a middle-aged housewife who feels her beauty has begun to fade and falls in love with her daughter's fiance.

== Cast ==
- Gerda Christophersen - Elsie von Lindtner
- Clara Wieth, Lisa
- Valdemar Psilander -Leopold von Würzen
- Otto Lagoni - den gamle greve
- Aage Hertel - Enrice Vallé, the Italian singer
- Frederik Jacobsen, Tjeneren Johan
- Lauritz Olsen - Sportsmanden
- Julie Henriksen
- Svend Cathala
- Gudrun Bruun Stephensen
- Franz Skondrup
- Axel Schultz
- Otto Detlefsen
- Lau Lauritzen Sr.
- Axel Boesen
