= Aage Hertel =

Danish actor (1873–1944)

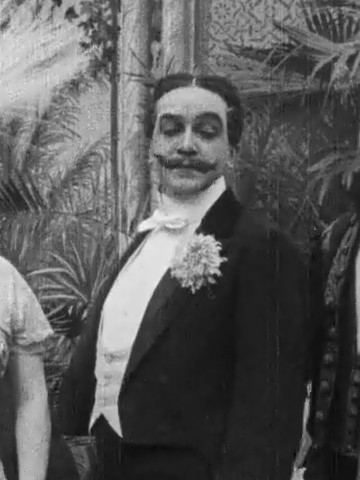
- Aage Hertel in Den farlige alder (1911)
- Born: 17 October 1873; Frederiksberg, Denmark
- Died: 3 January 1944 (aged 70); Frederiksberg, Denmark
- Resting place: Garrison Cemetery, Copenhagen
- Occupation: Actor
- Years active: 1900–1944
- Spouse: Olivia Wilhelmine Omsted (divorced)

Aage Hertel (17 October 1873 – 3 January 1944) was a Danish stage, radio and film actor whose career began in the 1890s working as a stagehand and set painter. Hertel appeared in approximately ninety films during the silent film area.

== Early life and career ==
Aage Hertel was born in Frederiksberg to Royal Danish Army colonel Harald Christian Hertel and Michaelle Elisabeth (née Thomsen) Hertel. After he finished his studies, he began working as a stagehand and set painter before studying drama at the Royal Danish Theatre in Copenhagen. In 1901, he began an engagement as an actor at the Dagmarteatret in Copenhagen which lasted until 1909. He played on various tours of the Danish provinces and in Norway before beginning an engagement at the Odense Teater for the 1923–1924 season.

Hertel made his film debut as the character Vicomte d'Esternay in the 1910 August Blom directed drama short Elskovsbarnet for Nordisk Film. Hertel had a long career with Nordisk Film, appearing in approximately ninety films in the silent film area from the early 1910s until the late 1920s. He was often cast in the villainous roles and is possibly best known for starring roles in the Gar-el-Hama film series that ran in installments from 1911 until 1918, directed, in parts, by Eduard Schnedler-Sørensen and Robert Dinesen, and as John Smith in the A. W. Sandberg directed series Manden med de ni Fingre, which ran in installments from 1915 until 1917. Another prominent role was that of the Witch Judge in director Benjamin Christensen's 1922 Danish-Swedish coproduction silent horror film Häxan.

In 1917, he founded Den Danske Filmskole, an academy for devoted to creating stage and film costume, makeup and effects, which utilized putty and plastics. The academy was only short-lived, however and closed shortly afterward.

His last silent film role was as Jonny in the 1928 Georg Jacoby directed drama Jokeren, a Danish-German-French coproduction which featured an international cast including Gabriel Gabrio, Elga Brink, Renée Héribel, and Henry Edwards. He then focused his career on radio, appearing as a radio actor and organizer of literary material. In 1936, appeared in his only sound film, a small role in Millionærdrengen, a drama directed by A. W. Sandberg for A/S Palladium.

== Personal life and death ==
On 20 June 1901, Hertel married Olivia Wilhelmine "Lulla" Omsted while on a theatre tour in Oslo. The couple later divorced. He died in his home city of Frederiksberg on 3 January 1944, aged 70, and was buried at Garrison Cemetery, Copenhagen.

== Selected filmography ==
- Den farlige alder (1911)
- Pax aeterna (1917)
- Häxan (1922)
- Jokeren (1928)
- Millionærdrengen (1936)
