= Little Dorrit =

1855–1857 novel by Charles Dickens

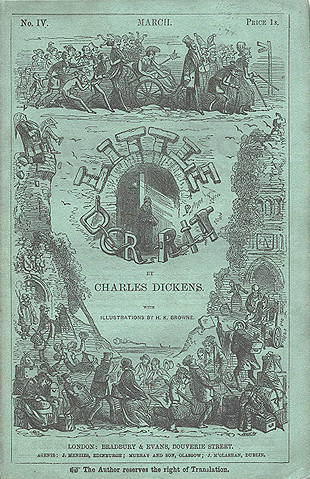
- Cover of serial Volume 4, March 1856
- Author: Charles Dickens
- Illustrator: Hablot Knight Browne (Phiz)
- Cover artist: Hablot Knight Browne (Phiz)
- Language: English
- Genre: Novel
- Published: Serial 1 December 1855 – 1 June 1857; Book 30 May 1857
- Publisher: Bradbury and Evans
- Publication place: England
- Media type: Print
- Preceded by: Hard Times
- Followed by: A Tale of Two Cities

Little Dorrit is a novel by English author Charles Dickens, originally published in serial form between 1855 and 1857. The story features Amy Dorrit, youngest child of her family, born and raised in the Marshalsea prison for debtors in London. Arthur Clennam encounters her after returning home from a 20-year absence, ready to begin his life anew.

The novel satirises some shortcomings of British society and government at the time, including the institution of debtors' prisons, where debtors were imprisoned, unable to work and yet incarcerated until they had repaid their debts. The prison in this case is the Marshalsea, where Dickens's own father had been imprisoned. Dickens is also critical of the inert bureaucracy of the British government, in this novel in the form of the fictional "Circumlocution Office". In addition, Dickens satirises the stratification of society that results from the British class system.

== Plot summary ==
=== Poverty ===
In 1826 Marseille, murderer Rigaud narrates to his prison cellmate John Baptist Cavalletto how he had killed his wife, just prior to being taken to trial. Businessman Arthur Clennam is detained with other travellers in quarantine in Marseilles and becomes friends with the merchants Mr. and Mrs. Meagles, their daughter "Pet", and their maid, an orphan named Harriet Beadle whom the family has nicknamed Tattycoram. Arthur has spent the last twenty years in China with his father, handling that part of the family business; his father died recently there. Arthur is now returning to London to see his mother, Mrs Clennam.

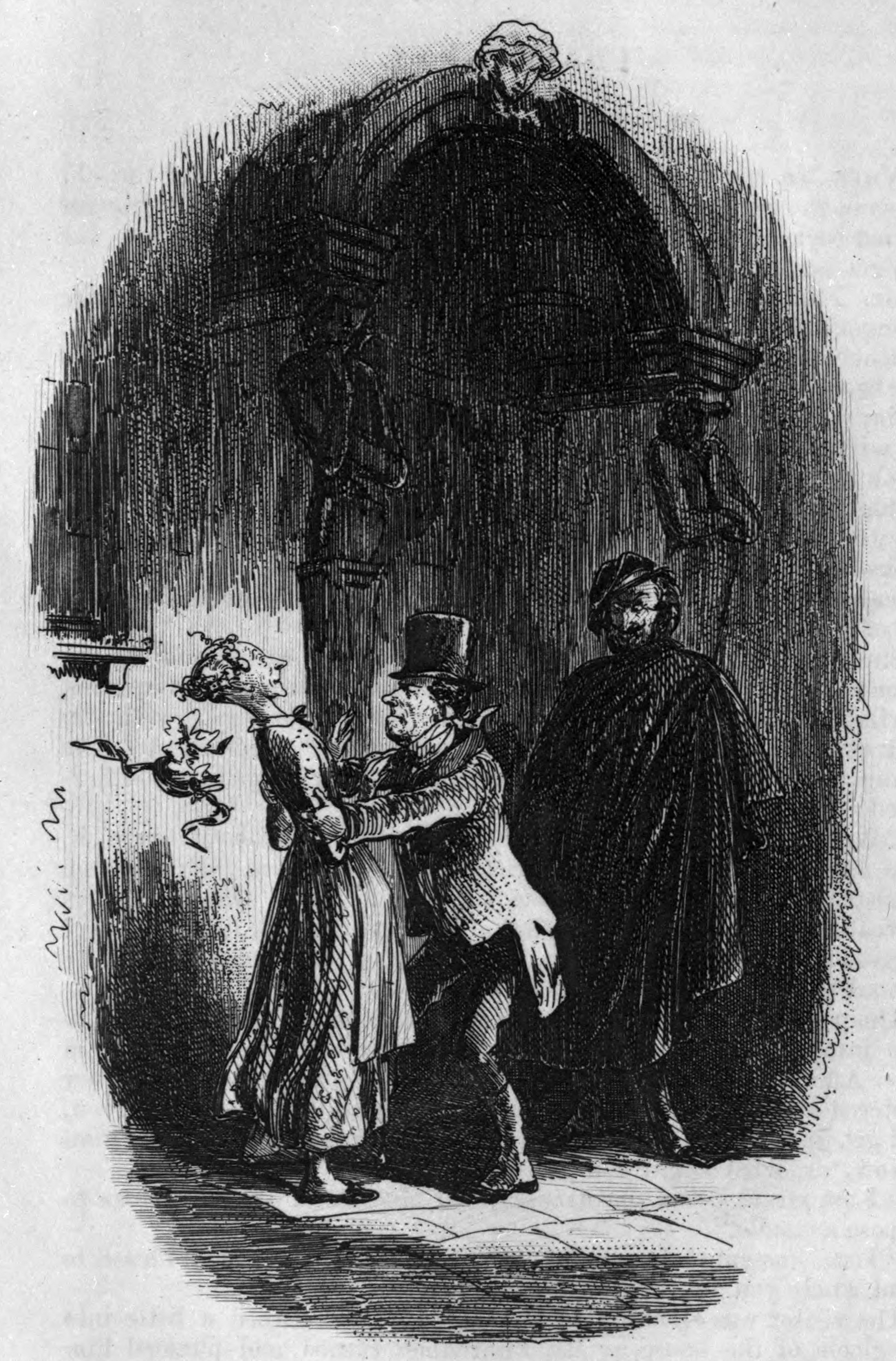
Mr Flintwinch has a mild attack of irritability

When Arthur's father was on his deathbed, he gave Arthur a watch to give to his mother with a message inside, murmuring "Your mother," which Arthur delivers to Mrs. Clennam. Inside the watch casing is an old silk paper with the initials DNF (do not forget) worked in beads. Arthur asks about the message, but Mrs. Clennam, who now uses a wheelchair, refuses to reveal what it means. Arthur says that he will not continue in the family business and will seek new opportunity on his own. Jeremiah Flintwinch then presses Mrs. Clennam on her failure to tell Arthur of the past.

In London, William Dorrit, imprisoned as a debtor, has been a resident of Marshalsea debtors' prison for over twenty years. He has three children: Edward (known as Tip), Fanny and Amy. The youngest daughter, Amy, was born in the prison and is affectionately known as Little Dorrit. Their mother died when Amy was eight years old. Tip has recently been imprisoned for his own gambling debts, and Fanny lives outside the prison with William's older brother Frederick. She works as a dancing girl in the music hall (where Frederick plays the clarinet) and has attracted the attention of the wealthy Edmund Sparkler. Little Dorrit, devoted to her father, supports them both through her sewing and is free to pass in and out of the prison. To maintain the honour of her father, who is embarrassed to acknowledge his financial position, Little Dorrit avoids mentioning her work outside the prison or his inability to leave. Mr Dorrit assumes the role of Father of the Marshalsea and is held in respect by its inhabitants, as if he had chosen to live there.

After Arthur tells his mother that he will not continue in the family business, Mrs. Clennam chooses her clerk Jeremiah Flintwinch as her partner. When Arthur learns that Mrs. Clennam employs Little Dorrit as a seamstress and shows her unusual kindness, he wonders whether the young girl might be connected with the watch's mystery. Arthur follows the girl to the Marshalsea. He tries in vain to enquire about William Dorrit's debt in the Circumlocution Office – assuming the role of benefactor towards Little Dorrit, her father, and her brother. Meanwhile, Rigaud, who has been released for lack of evidence, approaches Mrs. Clennam under the name Blandois and blackmails her and Flintwinch into giving him a place in her business.

While at the Circumlocution Office, Arthur meets successful inventor Daniel Doyce. Doyce wants a partner and man of business at his factory, and Arthur agrees to fill that role. Arthur encounters Cavalletto, who is injured by a carriage in London, and aids him in getting medical care. Cavalletto lives in hopes of never again seeing Blandois. Little Dorrit falls in love with Arthur, who fails to recognise her feelings. He is infatuated with Pet Meagles but is disappointed when she marries the cruel artist Henry Gowan. After Pet's wedding, the Meagles family suffers a blow when Tattycoram runs away to live with traveler Miss Wade.

Arthur becomes reacquainted with his former fiancée Flora Finching, the reason he was sent away to China. She is now a widow and takes care of the aunt of her late husband. Her father Mr Casby owns many rental properties, and his rent collector, Mr Pancks, takes the brunt of the dirty work of collecting Casby's inflated rents. Pancks discovers that William Dorrit is the lost heir to a fortune, enabling him to pay his way out of prison and altering the status of the entire family. Restored to wealth, Dorrit shuns all reminders of his past and forbids a heartbroken Little Dorrit from seeing Arthur again.

=== Riches ===
The now wealthy Dorrits decide that they should tour Europe as a newly respectable rich family. They travel over the Alps and take up residence for a time in Venice, and finally in Rome, displaying pride over their new-found wealth and position, hiding their past from new friends. Little Dorrit finds it difficult to adjust to their wealth and new social position, but only her uncle Frederick shares her feelings. Fanny and Tip adjust rapidly to the ways of society, as does Mr. Dorrit. But he fears that someone will discover the truth of his past. At a party in Rome, Mr Dorrit becomes confused and addresses the crowd in his role as Father of the Marshalsea. Returning to their lodgings, he falls ill and later dies. His distraught brother Frederick dies that same night. Left alone, Little Dorrit returns to London to stay with newly married Fanny and her husband, Edmund Sparkler. Meanwhile, Blandois disappears, and Mrs Clennam is suspected of his murder.

=== The financial collapse ===
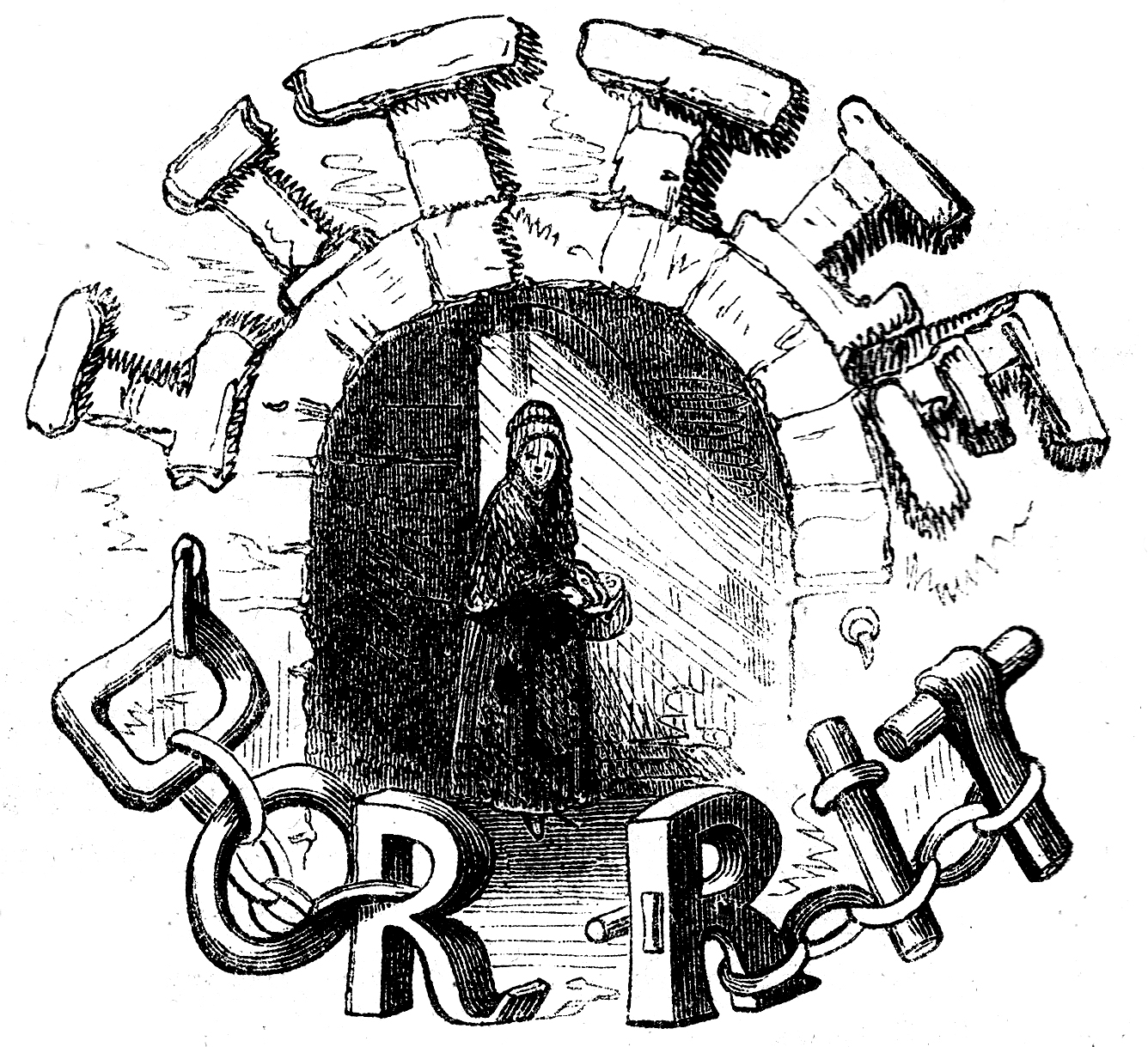
Engraving of "Little Dorrit", 1856

The financial house of Merdle, Edmund Sparkler's stepfather, ends with Merdle's suicide. The collapse of his bank and investment businesses takes with it the savings of the Dorrits, Arthur Clennam, the firm of Doyce and Clennam, Pancks and thousands of others. Pancks feels guilt for persuading Clennam to invest with Merdle, whom everyone considered the financial "man of the hour." Ashamed and unable to pay the business debts, Clennam is imprisoned in the Marshalsea, where he becomes ill. When Little Dorrit arrives in London, she nurses him back to health.

At Arthur's request, Cavalletto tracks down Blandois and brings him to Arthur at the Marshalsea. One week after the meeting in the Marshalsea, the truth of Mrs. Clennam's past is revealed by Blandois and confirmed by Jeremiah at the Clennam home. Her marriage was arranged by her parents and Clennam's great uncle Gilbert, who knew his nephew had already married. Mrs. Clennam insisted on bringing up Arthur and denying his biological mother, his father's first wife, the right to see him. Mrs. Clennam feels this is her right to punish others, under the guise of her religion. She was hurt and used her power to hurt others.

Arthur's biological mother died about the same time as Arthur went off to China. In her younger life, she lived at a boarding house of artistic people in London. Later Mr. Clennam's wealthy uncle Gilbert, stung by remorse, left a bequest to Arthur's biological mother and to the youngest daughter of her patron. If the patron had no daughter, the youngest child of his brother would inherit. The patron was Frederick Dorrit, who owned the boarding house and had taught and befriended Arthur's biological mother, so the beneficiary is his niece, Amy Dorrit.

After prodding Mrs. Clennam to tell the truth, which she refused to do, Jeremiah gave the papers with this codicil to the uncle's will to his twin brother on the night that Arthur arrived home. He told Mrs. Clennam that he had burned the papers on the next day. Blandois took the papers after killing Jeremiah's brother and left a copy at the Marshalsea for Little Dorrit.

Although Mrs Clennam failed to tell Little Dorrit of her inheritance or give it to her, she hired her for seamstress work. She failed to tell Arthur about his biological mother, although Arthur had sensed that his father had some past burden on his mind as he died. Unwilling to yield to blackmail by Blandois and with some remorse, the rigid woman rises from her chair and totters out of her house to reveal the secrets to Little Dorrit at the Marshalsea. Mrs. Clennam begs her forgiveness, which the girl grants.

Returning home, Mrs. Clennam falls in the street, never to recover the use of her speech or limbs, as the house of Clennam collapses before her eyes, killing Blandois. Affery was outdoors seeking her mistress, and Jeremiah had escaped London with as much money as he could find. Rather than hurt Arthur, Little Dorrit chooses not to reveal the will that was meant to benefit her but will tell him about his parents after his mother dies.

Mr. Meagles seeks the original papers, stopping in France to ask Miss Wade. She has them but denies it. Tattycoram, who has suffered under Miss Wade's sadistic temperament, follows Meagles back to London and presents the papers to him. He gives them to Little Dorrit. When Arthur is well and they are about to marry, Little Dorrit asks him to burn the papers. Mr. Meagles then seeks out Arthur's business partner Daniel Doyce from abroad. Doyce returns a wealthy and successful man, who arranges to clear all debts for Arthur's release. Arthur is released from the prison with his fortunes revived, his position secure with Doyce, and his health restored. Arthur and Little Dorrit marry.

== Sub-plots ==
Little Dorrit contains numerous sub-plots. One concerns Arthur Clennam's friends, the kind-hearted Meagles family, who are upset when their daughter Pet marries the artist Henry Gowan, and when their servant and foster daughter Tattycoram is lured away from them by the sinister Miss Wade, an acquaintance of the criminal Rigaud. A jilted sweetheart of Gowan, Miss Wade is ruled by her anger.

Another subplot concerns the Italian man John Baptist Cavalletto, who was the cellmate of Rigaud in Marseilles when jailed for a minor crime. He makes his way to London, meets up by chance with Clennam – who stands security for him as he builds up his business in wood carving – and gains acceptance among the residents of Bleeding Heart Yard. Cavalletto repays this aid by searching for Blandois/Rigaud when Arthur wants him found. This action leads to the revelation of Mrs Clennam's secrets.

The other major subplot is the satire of British bureaucracy, characterized by the Circumlocution Office, where the expertise is how not to do it.

== Characters ==
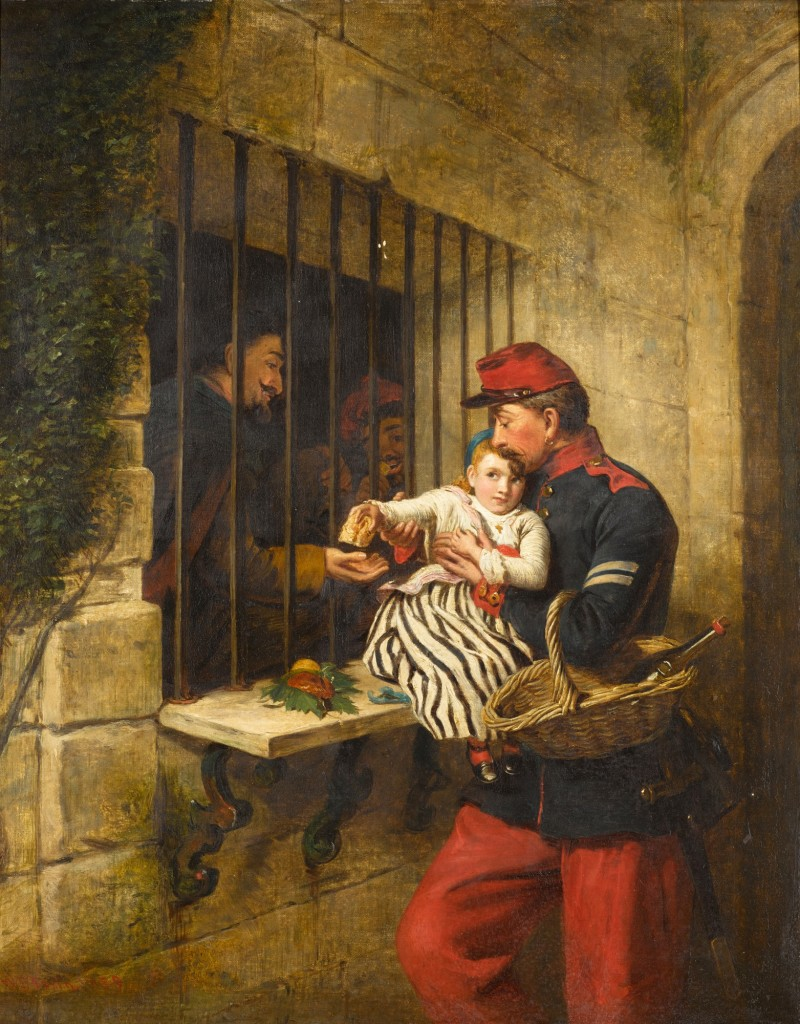
Interior of Marseilles Prison by William Powell Frith, 1859, depicts a scene from the first chapter

- Rigaud: European man who is in prison in Marseilles awaiting trial for murdering his wife. He demands that others treat him as a gentleman, though he does not treat others as a gentleman would. After he persuades the jury he is not guilty, he is released. Known as Lagnier when encountered by Cavalletto at an inn in France, in England he is known as Blandois.
- John Baptist Cavalletto: Italian man awaiting trial for minor smuggling in Marseilles and put in the same cell with Rigaud. He makes his way to England, settling in Bleeding Heart Yard, through his connection with Arthur Clennam.
- Arthur Clennam: Returning from China, he spent weeks in quarantine in Marseilles, having traveled through a place with plague. He is 40 years old single, and meets new friends in the quarantine. He is a man of honour and kindness, with skills in business.
- Mrs Clennam: Wife of Arthur Clennam's father, who ran the family business in London. She was raised in a strict and harsh religious sect and keeps up the ways of her childhood. She kept Arthur with her in London until he was caught with a sweetheart, and both she and the girl's parents disapproved of the connection. She sent Arthur away to work with his father in China.
- Mr Gilbert Clennam: Uncle to the father of Arthur Clennam and founder of the family business. He forced Arthur's father, whom he raised, to give up the marriage he made to marry a woman of the uncle's choosing. Gilbert Clennam is not alive in the time of this story but was when Arthur was born 40 years earlier.
- The biological mother of Arthur Clennam: She is only mentioned as Arthur's biological mother and the first wife of his father. She was pushed away by Mrs Clennam and Gilbert Clennam.
- Affery: Later Mrs Flintwinch. She takes care of Mrs Clennam and of Arthur before he went to China. She is afraid of both her husband and her mistress. She hears the sounds of the building, all mysterious to her.
- Mr Jeremiah Flintwinch: Clerk to the Clennam business until Arthur announces that he will not work in the family business on his return to London. Mr Flintwinch is raised up to be partner with Mrs Clennam. When Mrs Clennam became an invalid needing much care, she decided that Flintwinch and Affery should marry, so they did. After the blackmail attempt, he fled London and was said to be known as Mynheer von Flyntevynge in Amsterdam and The Hague.
- Mr Meagles: A retired English banker travelling in Europe with his wife, daughter and the maid for his daughter. He and his family are held in quarantine at Marseilles, having travelled through an area with plague, though none are ill. He becomes friends with Arthur Clennam.
- Mrs Meagles: Wife of Mr Meagles and mother of their daughter.
- Minnie Meagles: Daughter of Mr and Mrs Meagles, survivor of twin girls. She is a beautiful young woman, spoiled by her parents, and known as Pet to them.
- Tattycoram: Maid to Minnie Meagles. She was an orphan taken in by the Meagles. She is younger than Minnie, with rich dark hair, and has a temperament that can run to anger. Her real name is Harriet Beadle. She lives with the family in Twickenham, then with Miss Wade in London and in Calais until she returns to the Meagles.
- Miss Wade: Another traveller held in quarantine in Marseilles. She is aloof but makes a connection with Tattycoram. She once was wooed by Henry Gowan. She is linked with Rigaud, as he left the valuable box of Clennam family papers with her.
- Mr William Dorrit: About thirty years before the story begins, he entered the Marshalsea debtors' prison with his wife and two children. Over time he becomes the "Father of the Marshalsea", based on his social ways, maintaining the expectations of the class in which he was raised. He makes no efforts to resolve the situation that put him in the prison.
- Mrs Dorrit: She arrived at the prison a day after her husband, with their two children. She was pregnant, and about seven months later gave birth to their third child and second daughter. Mrs Dorrit died when the girl was about 8 years old.
- Edward Dorrit: The eldest child of the Dorrits, also called Tip, who enters the prison at about age 3. He grows up to become a gambler.
- Fanny Dorrit: The elder daughter of the Dorrits, who enters the prison at age 2. She grows to be an attractive and active young woman, who takes training in dancing for the theatre. Later she marries Edmund Sparkler.
- Amy Dorrit: She was born in the prison and is called Little Dorrit. She grows up as a girl who cares for others and is practical in getting enough money to support herself and her father in the prison. She is the emotional and practical centre of her family. She is 22 years old when the story opens.
- Frederick Dorrit: Elder brother of William, uncle to Edward, Fanny and Amy. He is artistic, and he plays a musical instrument to support himself since the family finances fell apart. He does not have the same character as his younger brother. In his younger days, he had a house for artistic people, and took in the mother of Arthur Clennam who was a singer.
- Young John Chivery: He is the son of John Chivery, who hopes to hand over his position on the lock at the Marshalsea Prison in due time. Young John is in love with Little Dorrit, but his feelings are not returned. He acts to aid her when he can, including helping Pancks in the "fortune teller" task of linking the Dorrits to their inheritance.
- Mrs Finching: Now a widow, in her young days Flora was in love with Arthur Clennam. When he returns to England, she maintains a hope that he will fall in love with her again, though she has changed greatly. She adds humour when she enters a scene, never able to address Arthur as Mr Clennam, as would be proper in the present. Her father is Mr Casby.
- Mr F's aunt: When her husband dies, Mrs Finching inherits the care of his aunt, whose words are spoken with defiance, but never really make sense.
- Mr Christopher Casby: Also called The Patriarch, for his deceptively kind appearance, with long grey hair. He pushes Pancks to ruthlessly collect rents, while maintaining a benevolent image before the world. He owns the property of Bleeding Heart Yard, and Flora is his daughter.
- Mr Pancks: Rent collector for Mr Casby. He becomes friends with Arthur Clennam, and indulges his side interest of matching people with lost inheritances, in which role he calls himself the "fortune teller".
- Mr Rugg: Attorney for Mr Pancks and for Doyce & Clennam, also landlord to Pancks. He aided in the "fortune-telling" work to link Dorrits to their inheritance.
- Daniel Doyce: An inventor of mechanical devices, with a trail of successes in Paris and St Petersburg. He returns to England with vain hopes of getting a patent on a device he invented, and he has a company based in Bleeding Heart Yard. He first meets Arthur Clennam in the Circumlocution Department. He is friends with Mr Meagles, and takes on Arthur Clennam as his man of finance and business partner.
- Mr Edmund Sparkler: A dimwitted, upper class, young man who falls for Fanny Dorrit as a dancer. They meet again when the Dorrits are wealthy, and he pursues Fanny until she agrees to marry him. Before Mr Merdle (his "governor") fails, he secures a position for Sparkler in the Circumlocution Office.
- Mrs Merdle: Mother of Edmund Sparkler, and remarried to Mr Merdle. She finds her social match in Fanny Dorrit. She is also referred to as 'the Bosom'.
- Mr Merdle: In the period of riches for the Dorrits, he is the "man of the age", a banker and financier. News of his success in investments spreads like wildfire, with everyone putting their money with him, or wishing they could. His schemes fail, which is learned after he commits suicide.
- Mr Henry Gowan: Handsome young man, related to the Barnacle family but not closely enough to have more than a small annual income from his mother. He earns money as an artist, pursues Minnie Meagles and marries her around the time that the Dorrits become rich. He is supported financially by his in-laws. The young couple meet the Dorrits while both are touring in Europe.
- Mr Tite Barnacle: On staff in the Circumlocution Department in London. He is part of the titled family, the Barnacles. Arthur encounters him in his persistence, first to learn the creditor who keeps William Dorrit in debtors' prison, then to get the patent for Doyce's invention, two unsuccessful ventures.
- Mr Ferdinand Barnacle: Younger member of the noble family and friends with Henry Gowan. He visits Arthur Clennam at the Marshalsea prison, happy to learn the Circumlocution Office did not put him into the debtors' prison, and tries to explain to Arthur the value of their office doing nothing.
- Mr Plornish: Plasterer who lives with his family in Bleeding Heart Yard. He was briefly in the Marshalsea prison, where he met William Dorrit and Little Dorrit. He is a friend to Little Dorrit. Later he and his wife have a store, with funds supplied by William Dorrit before he left England.
- Mrs Plornish: Wife of the plasterer and a good friend to John Baptist Cavalletto when he arrives in Bleeding Heart Yard and a friend to Arthur Clennam.
- Mr Nandy: Father of Mrs Plornish. He lives with his daughter's family when their finances improve. Otherwise, he is forced to live in the poorhouse. He is the one pauper whom William Dorrit allows to visit him, but when Little Dorrit walks with him from the Plornish home to the prison, Dorrit is enraged that she is seen on the streets with a pauper.
- Maggy: Young woman, left underdeveloped due to disease, who is befriended by Little Dorrit. She calls Little Dorrit her little mother, as Maggy is taller and bigger than Little Dorrit.
- Mrs General: Widow hired by William Dorrit to guide his daughters in the ways of society when the family is rich. She is proud never to show any feelings, and always speak calmly. She is well "varnished".
- Ephraim Flintwinch: Twin brother of Jeremiah, living in Antwerp. He took in Arthur's birth mother after Mrs Clennam forced her away, and took care of her until her death, about the time that Arthur went off with his father. Before Arthur's return, Jeremiah gave his twin brother the original papers regarding the uncle's will and letters written by the mother. Rigaud murders Ephraim to obtain the box of documents.

== Development of the novel ==
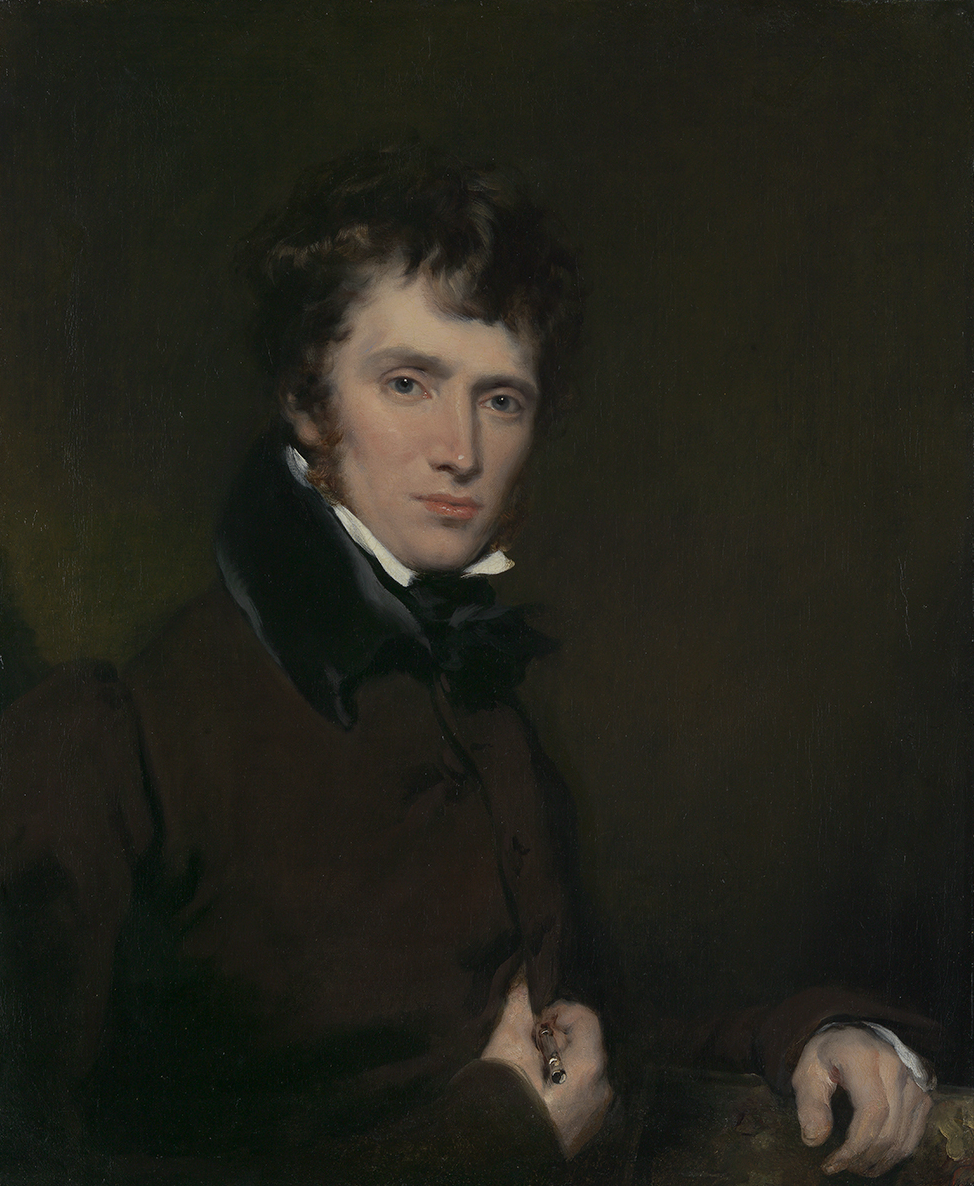
Dickens dedicated the book to his artist friend Clarkson Stanfield

The character Little Dorrit (Amy) was inspired by Mary Ann Cooper (née Mitton), whom Dickens sometimes visited along with her family, and called by that name. They lived in The Cedars, a house on Hatton Road, west of London; its site is now under the east end of London Heathrow Airport. This model for Little Dorrit, and the development of the plot, is contested by others. Dickens' working title for the novel was Nobody’s Fault. He dedicated the book to his close friend and frequent collaborator the artist Clarkson Stanfield.

== Significance and reception ==
Like much of Dickens's later fiction, this novel has seen many reversals of critical fortune. It has been shown to be a critique of HM Treasury and the blunders that led to the deaths of 360 British soldiers at the Battle of Balaclava. Imprisonment – both literal and figurative – is a major theme of the novel, with Clennam and the Meagles quarantined in Marseilles, Rigaud jailed for murder, Mrs Clennam confined to her house, the Dorrits imprisoned in the Marshalsea, and most of the characters trapped within the rigidly defined English social class structure of the time.

Tchaikovsky, a voracious reader and theatre-goer when he was not composing, was entranced by the book.

Franz Kafka, a great admirer of Dickens, sent a copy to Felice Bauer. " Yesterday I sent you Little Dorrit. You know it well. How could we forget Dickens. It's probably not a good read in its entirety with the children, but parts of it will certainly give you and them great pleasure."

George Bernard Shaw hailed Little Dorrit as a "masterpiece among many masterpieces" and a "more seditious book than Das Kapital". He viewed it as a profound, revolutionary critique of 19th-century capitalism and class government.

The American critic Anne Stevenson speaks of Little Dorrit as "a wonderful read – a tragical-comical-satirical-poetical mystery story that turns out to be an allegory of love." She praises the characterization of the "major characters" (Arthur Clennam, Mr Dorrit, Little Dorrit), but sees others as "a cast of puppets that the master showman can't help but tag with formulaic phrases … Each character's name is a guide to the entertainment to be expected: the energetic Mr Pancks invariably rakes his hair upright and steams about like a tugboat; Mr Sparkler rants about "damn fine women with no nonsense about them"; Mr Flintwinch, with his wry neck and crooked necktie, perpetually screws himself into sinister corners."

== Publication history ==
Little Dorrit was published in 19 monthly instalments, each consisting of 32 pages with two illustrations by Hablot Knight Browne whose pen name was Phiz. Each instalment cost a shilling except for the last, a double issue which cost two shillings.

Book One – Poverty

- I – December 1855 (chapters 1–4)
- II – January 1856 (chapters 5–8)
- III – February 1856 (chapters 9–11)
- IV – March 1856 (chapters 12–14)
- V – April 1856 (chapters 15–18)
- VI – May 1856 (chapters 19–22)
- VII – June 1856 (chapters 23–25)
- VIII – July 1856 (chapters 26–29)
- IX – August 1856 (chapters 30–32)
- X – September 1856 (chapters 33–36)

Book Two – Riches

- XI – October 1856 (Chapters 1–4)
- XII – November 1856 (Chapters 5–7)
- XIII – December 1856 (chapters 8–11)
- XIV – January 1857 (chapters 12–14)
- XV – February 1857 (chapters 15–18)
- XVI – March 1857 (Chapters 19–22)
- XVII – April 1857 (Chapters 23–26)
- XVIII – May 1857 (Chapters 27–29)
- XIX-XX – June 1857 (Chapters 30–34)

The novel was then issued as a book by Bradbury and Evans in 1857.

== Adaptations ==
Little Dorrit has been adapted for the screen six times.

The first, a two-reel short, was released on July 29, 1913 by Thanhouser, directed by James Kirkwood.

The 1920 version was a British adaptation directed by Sidney Morgan.

A Danish version appeared in 1924, directed by A.W. Sandberg with Frederik Jensen as William Dorrit, Gunnar Tolnæs as Clennam, and Karina Bell in the title role.

The 1934 German adaptation, Kleine Dorrit, starred Anny Ondra as Little Dorrit and Mathias Wieman as Arthur Clennam. It was directed by Karel Lamač.

The fifth adaptation, in 1987, was a UK feature film of the same title as the novel, directed by Christine Edzard and starring Alec Guinness as William Dorrit and Derek Jacobi as Arthur Clennam, supported by a cast of over 300 British actors.

The sixth adaptation was a TV series co-produced by the BBC and WGBH Boston, written by Andrew Davies and featuring Claire Foy (as Little Dorrit), Andy Serkis (as Rigaud/Blandois), Matthew Macfadyen (as Arthur Clennam), Tom Courtenay (as William Dorrit), Judy Parfitt (as Mrs Clennam), and Alun Armstrong (as Jeremiah/Ephraim Flintwinch). The series aired between October and December 2008 in the UK, in the USA on PBS's Masterpiece in April 2009, and in Australia, on ABC1 TV, in June and July 2010.

In 2001 BBC Radio 4 broadcast a radio adaptation of five hour-long episodes, starring Sir Ian McKellen as the narrator.

Little Dorrit forms the backdrop to Peter Ackroyd's debut novel, The Great Fire of London (1982).

Dickens's story provided inspiration for the web comic The Adventures of Dorrit Little by artist Monica McKelvey Johnson.

Eduard Künneke was announced to be at work on an operatic setting of the novel in 1926.
