= The Mysterious Footprints =

- Directed by: A.W. Sandberg
- Written by: A.W. Sandberg
- Starring: Carl Brisson
- Cinematography: H.F. Rimmen
- Production company: Nordisk Film
- Distributed by: Fotorama (Denmark); UFA (Germany)
- Release date: 4 March 1918
- Country: Denmark
- Languages: Silent; Danish intertitles

The Mysterious Footprints (Danish: De mystiske fodspor) is a 1918 Danish silent film directed by A.W. Sandberg and starring Carl Brisson.

== Cast ==
- Carl Brisson as Erik
- Anton De Verdier as Carl
- Else Frölich as Marion
- Henny Lauritzen as Countess Bleking
- Peter Nielsen as Sverre Bjerke
- Ulla Nielsen as Girl
- Lizzie Ruge as Girl
- Charles Willumsen as Servant

== Bibliography ==
- Marguerite Engberg. Den danske stumfilm 1903-1930: Et index. Danske Filmmuseum, 1968.
