= The Last Night (1928 film) =

1928 film

- Directed by: A.W. Sandberg
- Written by: Norbert Falk; Robert Liebmann; Sophus Michaëlis (play)
- Starring: Diomira Jacobini; Gösta Ekman; Karina Bell
- Cinematography: Christen Jørgensen; Hans Scheib
- Music by: Giuseppe Becce
- Production company: Terra Film
- Distributed by: Terra Film
- Release date: 4 October 1928
- Country: Germany
- Languages: Silent; German intertitles

The Last Night (1928)

The Last Night (German: Revolutionshochzeit) is a 1928 German silent historical film directed by A.W. Sandberg and starring Diomira Jacobini, Gösta Ekman and Karina Bell. Produced and distributed by Terra Film, it was shot at the company's Marienfelde Studios in Berlin. The film's sets were designed by the art director Hans Jacoby.

== Cast ==
- Diomira Jacobini as Alaine
- Gösta Ekman as Marc-Anton
- Karina Bell as Leontine
- Walter Rilla as Ernest
- Fritz Kortner as Montaloup
- Paul Henckels as Prosper
- Ernst Behmer

== Bibliography ==
- Qvist, Per Olov & von Bagh, Peter. Guide to the Cinema of Sweden and Finland. Greenwood Publishing Group, 2000.
