= 5 raske piger =

1933 film

- Directed by: A. W. Sandberg
- Written by: Svend Rindom; Paul Sarauw
- Produced by: Svend Nielsen
- Starring: Karina Bell
- Cinematography: Carlo Bentsen
- Release date: 21 August 1933
- Running time: 105 minutes
- Country: Denmark
- Language: Danish

5 raske piger is a 1933 Danish comedy film directed by A. W. Sandberg and starring Karina Bell.

== Cast ==
- Karina Bell as Annie From
- Marguerite Viby as Karin From
- Tove Wallenstrøm as Grace From
- Nanna Stenersen as Irene From
- Vesla Stenersen as Maud From
- Frederik Jensen as Steen
- Jonna Neiiendam as Agatha Steen
- Albrecht Schmidt as Sshwartz
- Erling Schroeder as Jørgen Steen
- Angelo Bruun as Sigurd
- Eigil Reimers as Knud
- Helmuth Larsen as Richard
- Per Gundmann as Willy
- Arthur Jensen as Pjevs
- Carl Fisher as Jeppe
- Holger-Madsen as Regissør
- Bjarne Forchhammer as Frantz
- Bjørn Spiro as Påtrængende mand
- Kai Ewans
- Carl Fischer as Jeppe
- Leo Mathisen
- Poul Reichhardt as Mand der bærer køje
