= Peter Nielsen (actor) =

Danish actor (1876–1949)

- Born: Niels Peter Nielsen; 2 December 1876; Haldum, Denmark
- Died: 26 September 1949 (aged 72); Copenhagen, Denmark
- Occupation: Actor
- Years active: 1910–1947 (film)

Niels Peter Nielsen (12 December 1876 – 26 September 1949) was a Danish stage and film actor.

== Selected filmography ==
- Tabitha, Stand Up (1922)
- Little Dorrit (1924)
- The White Geisha (1926)
- The Clown (1926)
- Familien Olsen (1940)
- I de gode, gamle dage (1940)
- En mand af betydning (1941)
- The Burning Question (1943)
- Melody of Murder (1944)
- Besættelse (1944)

== Bibliography ==
- Waldman, Harry. Missing Reels: Lost Films of American and European Cinema. McFarland, 2000.
