= Torben Meyer =

Danish actor (1884–1975)

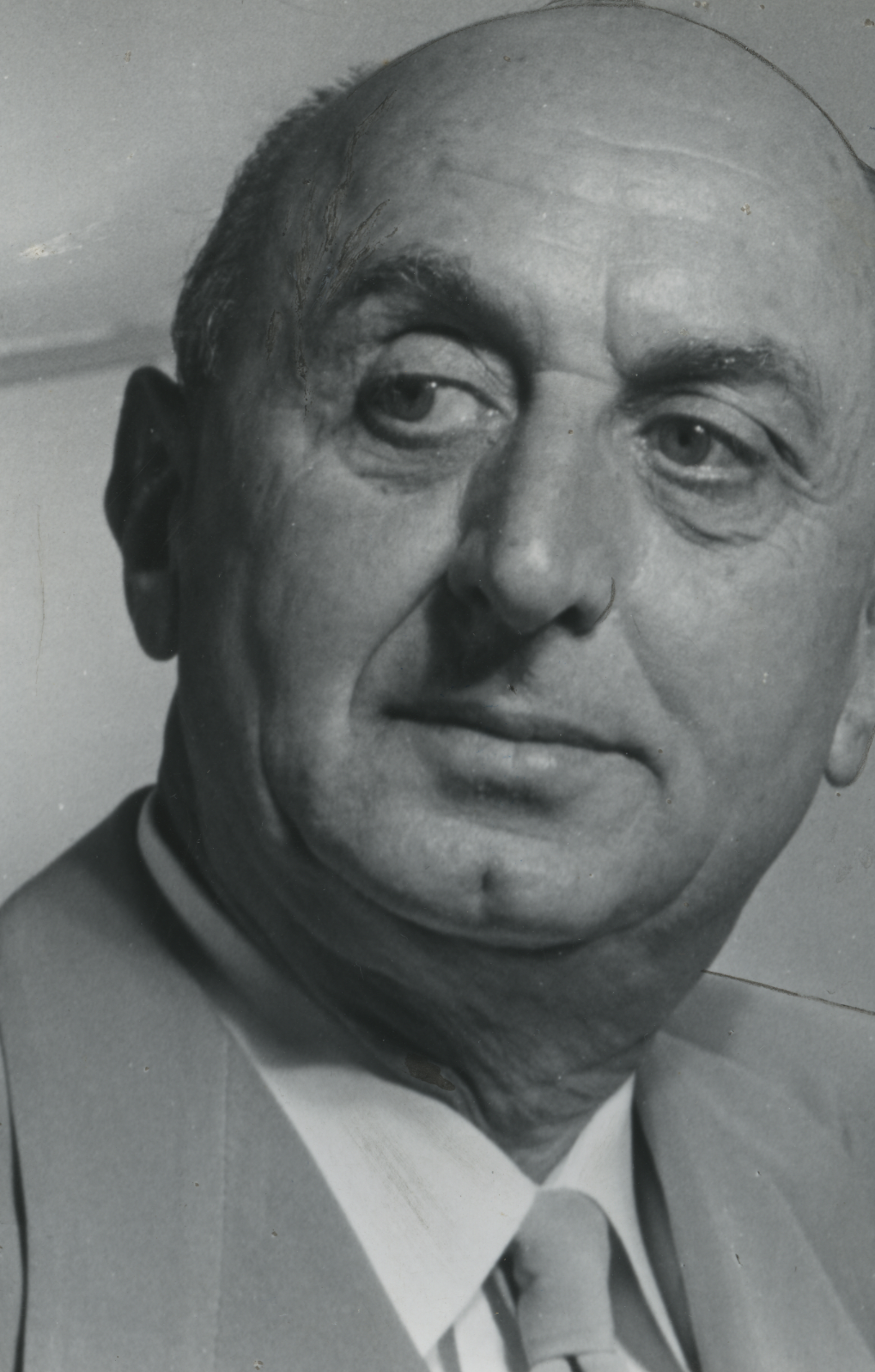
- Meyer in 1950
- Born: Torben Emil Meyer; 1 December 1884; Aarhus, Denmark
- Died: 22 May 1975 (aged 90); Hollywood, California, U.S.
- Resting place: Chapel of the Pines Crematory
- Occupation: Actor
- Years active: 1912–1966

Torben Emil Meyer (1 December 1884 – 22 May 1975) was a Danish character actor, who appeared in more than 250 film and television roles in a 55-year career. He began his acting career in Europe before moving to the United States, where he often worked with director Preston Sturges.

== Early life ==
Meyer was born in Aarhus, Denmark, the son of hotelier Holger Meyer and his wife Kirstine (née Pedersen). He lived in Paris from 1899 to 1901, where he worked as a porter. In 1902, he joined the drama school at the Dagmarteatret in Copenhagen.

== Career ==
He made his professional stage debut at the Dagmarteatret in 1905, and was a member of its repertory company for two years. In 1908, he joined the company of the Det Ny Teater, where he remained until 1923, when he left due to a disagreement with management.

Starting in 1912, Meyer acted in 20 European silent movies, culminating with Don Quixote in 1926. He emigrated to the United States in 1927.

Danish friends Benjamin Christensen and Jean Hersholt may have helped Meyer obtain his first roles in Hollywood films. For decades Meyer found roles playing characters from many countries. A 1948 newspaper article stated Meyer can't complain about being typecast for he speaks German in Sealed Verdict, was a 17th-century Dutch sea captain in The Exile, a French professor in To the Victor, and the headwaiter in Variety Girl.

Meyer also wrote a column for the Danish newspaper Politiken.

=== Horror films ===
Meyer became a member of the "all-star peasant cast" in The Black Room, and considered Boris Karloff to be a good friend. He played the Dane in Murders in the Rue Morgue, and was strangled by Boris Karloff in Bride of Frankenstein. Meyer was Gaston, the night watchman, in the 1958 film The Fly

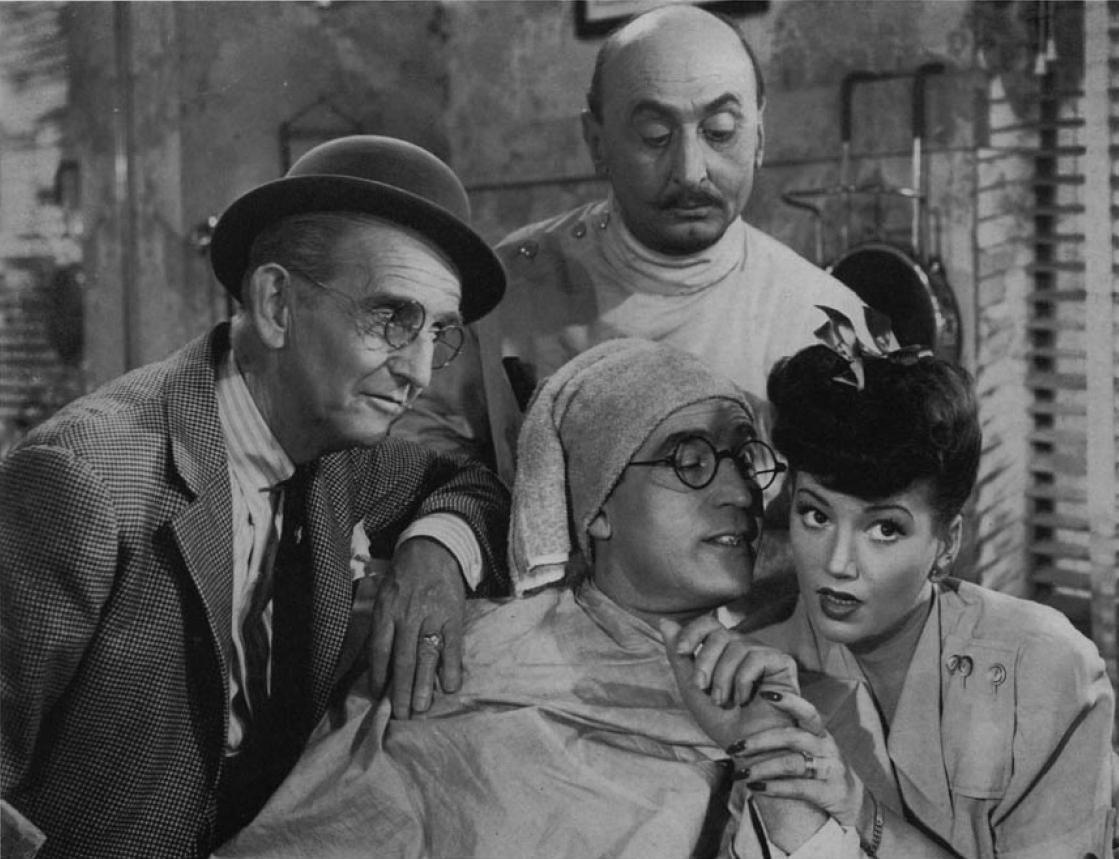
L. to R. : Jimmy Conlin, Harold Lloyd, Torben Meyer, and Arline Judge in The Sin of Harold Diddlebock (1947)

=== Preston Sturges films ===
Meyer was in numerous Preston Sturges films, and addressed him as Maitre (French for director). Meyers played Mr. Schmidt in Christmas in July, Purser in The Lady Eve, Doctor in both Sullivan's Travels and The Miracle of Morgan's Creek, Mr. Schultz in Hail the Conquering Hero, Dr. Dahlmeyer in The Great Moment, Barber in The Sin of Harold Diddlebock, and Dr. Schultz in The Beautiful Blonde from Bashful Bend.

=== Later roles ===
In 1961, when Meyer was 76 years old, he played Werner Lampe, an ex-Nazi judge on trial in Judgment at Nuremberg. His last film role was in A New Kind of Love, released in 1963, and his last television role was as Pedro Sven in the 1966 I Dream of Jeannie episode Jeannie Breaks the Bank.

== Honors ==
In 1962 Frederik IX of Denmark honored Meyer with the Knights’ Cross of the Order of the Dannebrog. It was presented to him by the consul general of Denmark, Honorable A.C. Karsten.

== Death ==
On 22 May 1975 Meyer died of bronchial pneumonia in Hollywood, California. He was cremated, and his remains are vaulted in the Chapel of the Pines.

== Filmography ==
Year	Title	Role	Notes
1912	Manegens stjerne	Dumme Peter	
1913	Staalkongens Villie		
1913	Kæmpedamens bortførelse		
1913	Ballettens Datter	Delange - Theatre Manager	
1913	Atlantis	Willy Snyders - artist	
1913	Kärleken rår	Kuno	
1913	Fra fyrste til knejpevært		
1914	Under Skæbnens Hjul		
1914	Af elskovs naade	Laege	
1914	Helvedesmaskinen	Lerche	
1914	Den kulørte slavehandler		
1915	Appetit og kærlighed	Jens	
1915	Held i Uheld	Fritz Tummel	
1915	Et huskors	Lensgreve Rosenørn	
1915	Revolutionsbryllup		
1915	Cigaretpigen	Pedro Delmart - Painter	
1915	Cowboymillionæren		
1915	Penge		
1916	En uheldig skygge		
1916	Voksdamen		
1916	En nydelig onkel		
1916	Lotteriseddel No. 22162	Charles - Apache	
1916	Manden uden fremtid	Tobby Spratt	
1916	Filmens Datter		
1916	Sønnen	Mr. Grøn	
1916	Truet lykke	Simoni	
1917	Manden uden Smil	Pianist	
1918	Hævneren	Niels	
1918	Prøvens Dag	Mr. von Scholten	
1919	Hans store Chance	Arthur	
1919	Bajadser	Rodolfo	
1919	Hvorledes jeg kom til Filmen	Gordon Sidney	
1919	Dømmer ikke	Philip Saphir	
1919	Prinsens Kærlighed		
1919	En ung mans väg	Agapetus von Dufva	
1920	Lykkeper	Walter Crone	
1921	Hendes fortid	Moses Volkenthal	
1921	Film, flirt og forlovelse	The Baron	
1922	Der var engang	Ceremonimesteren	
1923	Madsalune		
1923	Republikaneren	Editor	
1923	Den sidste dans	Herr von Schneppen	
1924	Min ven privatdetektiven		
1924	Little Dorrit	Hauptschließer Chivery	
1925	Fra Piazza del Popolo	Benedetto - Servant	
1926	Maharadjahens yndlingshustru III	Mohun Singh	
1926	The Clown	Butler	
1926	Don Quixote	Sancho Carrasco	
1928	The Man Who Laughs	The Spy	Uncredited
1928	Jazz Mad	Kline	
1928	Noah's Ark	Man on Train	Uncredited
1928	The Viking	Odd	
1928	The Last Warning	Gene	
1929	Behind Closed Doors	Captain von Gilden	
1930	Behind the Make-Up	Waiter	
1930	Lummox	Silly Willie	
1930	Mamba	German Soldier	Uncredited
1930	The Bad One		Uncredited
1930	Just Like Heaven	Pierre	
1930	The Lottery Bride	Miner	Uncredited
1930	A Soldier's Plaything	German Actor in Horse	Uncredited
1931	Trådlöst och kärleksfullt		
1931	Just a Gigolo	Waiter	Uncredited
1931	Half Way to Heaven	Director	
1932	Broken Lullaby	Waiter at Inn	Uncredited
1932	Murders in the Rue Morgue	The Dane	Uncredited
1932	What Price Hollywood?	Nick - Brown Derby Headwaiter	Uncredited
1932	Downstairs	Cafe Waiter	Uncredited
1932	Big City Blues	Second Waiter	Uncredited
1932	Six Hours to Live	Sturges - Butler	Uncredited
1932	Le bluffeur	Col. Ginsberg	
1932	The Animal Kingdom	Meyer - Idealistic Printer	Uncredited
1932	The Match King	Hans, Headwaiter	Uncredited
1933	The Crime of the Century	Eric Ericson - Butler	
1933	Reunion in Vienna	Headwaiter Strumpf	Uncredited
1933	Ladies Must Love	Beermaster	Uncredited
1933	Cradle Song	Papa	Uncredited
1933	The Worst Woman in Paris?	Taxi Driver	Uncredited
1934	Mandalay	Mr. Van Brinken	Uncredited
1934	All Men Are Enemies	Clerk	Uncredited
1934	Little Man, What Now?	Headwaiter	Uncredited
1934	The World Moves On	Head Butler	Uncredited
1934	Pursued	Hansen	Uncredited
1934	By Your Leave	Costume Company Fitter	Uncredited
1934	Music in the Air	Pharmacist	Uncredited
1935	Enter Madame	Carlson	
1935	The Night Is Young	Adjutant	Uncredited
1935	The Good Fairy	Head Waiter	Uncredited
1935	Roberta	Albert	
1935	Bride of Frankenstein	Victim in Flashback	Uncredited
1935	Mark of the Vampire	Card Player	Uncredited
1935	Break of Hearts	The Ritz Headwaiter	Uncredited
1935	The Girl Who Came Back	Zarabella	
1935	Front Page Woman	Janitor	Uncredited
1935	The Black Room	Peter	
1935	Two for Tonight	Waiter	Uncredited
1935	The Gay Deception	Waiter	Uncredited
1935	Thunder in the Night	Cafe Owner	Uncredited
1935	Charlie Chan in Shanghai	French Diplomat	Uncredited
1935	The Man Who Broke the Bank at Monte Carlo	Minor Role	Uncredited
1935	Splendor	Baron Von Hoffstatter	
1935	To Beat the Band	Headwaiter	Uncredited
1935	East of Java	Derelict	Uncredited
1935	A Tale of Two Cities	Lackey #1	Uncredited
1935	If You Could Only Cook	Swedish Servant	Uncredited
1936	King of Burlesque	Leopold the Valet	Uncredited
1936	It Had to Happen	Sign Painter	Uncredited
1936	The Preview Murder Mystery	Smith's Butler	Uncredited
1936	The Farmer in the Dell	Party Guest	Uncredited
1936	Till We Meet Again	Kraus	
1936	Champagne Charlie	Minor Role	Uncredited
1936	Piccadilly Jim	Pett's Butler	Uncredited
1936	Star for a Night	Saddle Maker	Uncredited
1936	In His Steps		Uncredited
1936	Wedding Present	Winternitz	Uncredited
1936	The Accusing Finger	Proprietor	Uncredited
1936	Espionage	Police Inspector	Uncredited
1936	The King and the Chorus Girl	Eric - the Butler	Uncredited
1937	Thin Ice	Chauffeur	
1937	The Good Old Soak	Headwaiter	Uncredited
1937	Shall We Dance	Show Producer	Uncredited
1937	The Emperor's Candlesticks	Train Announcer	Uncredited
1937	She's No Lady	Swedish Waiter	Uncredited
1937	The Prisoner of Zenda	Max - Butler	
1937	Wife, Doctor and Nurse	Second Tailor	Uncredited
1937	Madame X	Peridcord	Uncredited
1937	Fight for Your Lady	Hungarian Police Officer	Uncredited
1937	Prescription for Romance	Hotel Desk Clerk	Uncredited
1937	Tovarich	Servant	Uncredited
1938	The First Hundred Years	Karl	
1938	Bulldog Drummond's Peril	Hoffman	Uncredited
1938	Romance in the Dark	Prof. Jacobsen	
1938	Romance in the Dark	Art Critic	Uncredited
1938	The Saint in New York	German Police Prefect	Uncredited
1938	I'll Give a Million	Doorman	Uncredited
1938	The Great Waltz	Ticket Taker at Dommayer's	Uncredited
1938	Topper Takes a Trip	Hotel Doorman	Uncredited
1939	Island of Lost Men	Cafe Manager	Uncredited
1939	Nurse Edith Cavell	German Officer	Uncredited
1939	Everything Happens at Night	Station Master	Uncredited
1940	Dr. Ehrlich's Magic Bullet	Kadereit	Uncredited
1940	The Way of All Flesh	Sandor Nemzeti	
1940	Four Sons	Gustav	
1940	The Great Dictator	Bald Barbershop Customer	Uncredited
1940	Christmas in July	Mr. Schmidt	
1940	No, No, Nanette	Furtlemertle	Uncredited
1941	The Lady Eve	Mr. Clink - Purser	Uncredited
1941	Sunny	Jean (head waiter)	
1941	Sullivan's Travels	The Doctor	
1941	Bedtime Story	Dinglehoff	Uncredited
1942	The Adventures of Martin Eden	Jacob	Uncredited
1942	Crossroads	Old Man	Uncredited
1942	Berlin Correspondent	Manager	
1942	The Palm Beach Story	Dr. Kluck	
1942	Casablanca	Dutch Banker at Cafe Table	Uncredited
1943	Frankenstein Meets the Wolf Man	Gypsy	Uncredited
1943	Edge of Darkness	Cannery Clerk	Uncredited
1943	They Came to Blow Up America	Graumark Hotel Desk Clerk	Uncredited
1943	Jack London	Literary Guest	Uncredited
1943	The Miracle of Morgan's Creek	Dr. Meyer	Uncredited
1944	The Purple Heart	Karl Kappel	Uncredited
1944	Once Upon a Time	Hotel Manager	Uncredited
1944	The Great Moment	Dr. Dahlmeyer	
1944	Hail the Conquering Hero	Mr. Schultz	Uncredited
1944	Greenwich Village	Kavosky's Butler	Uncredited
1945	Hotel Berlin	Franz, the Barber	Uncredited
1945	A Royal Scandal	Stooge	Uncredited
1945	Yolanda and the Thief	Town Official	Uncredited
1946	The Kid from Brooklyn	Garden Party Guest	Uncredited
1946	Heartbeat	Thief at Ball	Uncredited
1946	Monsieur Beaucaire	Count	Uncredited
1946	Alias Mr. Twilight	Starling	
1947	The Mighty McGurk	Second Brewer	
1947	The Sin of Harold Diddlebock	Barber with Mustache	
1947	The Beginning or the End	Milkman	Uncredited
1947	Millie's Daughter	Mr. Johnson	Uncredited
1947	Variety Girl	Andre - Brown Derby Headwaiter	
1947	Song of Love	Stage Manager	Uncredited
1947	The Exile	Sea Captain	
1948	To the Victor	Elderly Frenchman	Uncredited
1948	Letter from an Unknown Woman	Carriage Driver	Uncredited
1948	Julia Misbehaves	Commissar	Uncredited
1948	Sealed Verdict	Courtroom interpreter	
1948	Unfaithfully Yours	Dr. Schultz	
1949	The Beautiful Blonde from Bashful Bend	Dr. Shultz	
1949	Hold That Baby!	Dr. Hans Heinrich	
1949	The Great Lover	Ship's Captain	Uncredited
1949	And Baby Makes Three	Waiter	Uncredited
1950	The Great Rupert	Mr. Petrushka - the Baker	Uncredited
1951	Grounds for Marriage	Donovan	
1951	The Company She Keeps	Maitre'd in French Restaurant	Uncredited
1951	That's My Boy	Photographer	Uncredited
1951	Night into Morning	Butcher	Uncredited
1951	Come Fill the Cup	Delmar - Ives' Auto Mechanic	Uncredited
1951	The Blue Veil	Photographer	Uncredited
1951	My Favorite Spy	Headwaiter	Uncredited
1952	What Price Glory	Mayor	Uncredited
1952	The Merry Widow	Station Master	Uncredited
1953	Call Me Madam	Rudolph	Uncredited
1953	The Story of Three Loves	Man in Saloon	Uncredited
1953	Ma and Pa Kettle on Vacation	Doorman at Hotel Louis	Uncredited
1953	Houdini	Headwaiter	Uncredited
1954	Casanova's Big Night	Attendant	Uncredited
1954	About Mrs. Leslie	Maitre D'	Uncredited
1954	Living It Up	Chef	Uncredited
1954	Deep in My Heart	Card Player	Uncredited
1955	We're No Angels	Butterfly Man	Uncredited
1956	The Conqueror	Scribe	Uncredited
1956	Anything Goes	French Waiter	Uncredited
1956	Hollywood or Bust	Waiter	Uncredited
1957	Public Pigeon No. 1	Waiter	Uncredited
1957	The Helen Morgan Story	Manager	Uncredited
1958	The Fly	Gaston	Uncredited
1958	The Matchmaker	Alex, Headwaiter, Harmonica Club	
1959	This Earth Is Mine	Hugo	Uncredited
1959	Li'l Abner	Butler	Uncredited
1960	G.I. Blues	Headwaiter	Uncredited
1961	Judgment at Nuremberg	Werner Lampe	
1963	A New Kind of Love	Hotel Clerk	Uncredited
