= David Copperfield (1922 film) =

1922 film

- Directed by: A.W. Sandberg
- Written by: Laurids Skands
- Based on: David Copperfield; 1850 novel by Charles Dickens
- Starring: Gorm Schmidt; Martin Herzberg; Margarete Schlegel
- Cinematography: Christen Jørgensen; Louis Larsen
- Production company: Nordisk Film
- Distributed by: Nordisk Film; UFA (Germany)
- Release date: 5 December 1922
- Running time: 140 minutes
- Country: Denmark
- Languages: Silent; Danish intertitles

David Copperfield is a 1922 Danish drama film directed by A.W. Sandberg and starring Gorm Schmidt, Martin Herzberg and Margarete Schlegel.

The film was made as part of an attempt to re-establish Danish cinema in the English-speaking world. While successful in Scandinavia, the film failed to do well in Britain and America.

The film's sets were designed by the art director Carlo Jacobsen.

== Plot ==
David Copperfield (1922)

For a detailed plot, see David Copperfield (novel).

== Cast ==
- Gorm Schmidt as David Copperfield som voksen
- Martin Herzberg as David Copperfield som barn
- Margarete Schlegel as David Copperfields mor
- Karen Winther as Agnes som voksen
- Else Nielsen as Agnes som barn
- Poul Reumert as Sagfører Wickfield, Agnes' far
- Frederik Jensen as Mr. Micawber
- Anne-Marie Wiehe as Mrs. Micawber
- Karina Bell as Dora Spenlow
- Robert Schmidt as Mr. Murdstone
- Ellen Rovsing as Miss Murdstone
- Marie Dinesen as Tante Betsy
- Karen Caspersen as Pegotty
- Charles Wilken as Mr. Chillip
- Rasmus Christiansen as Uriah Heep
- Peter Malberg as Mr. Dick
- Mathilde Nielsen

== Bibliography ==
- Glavin, John. Dickens on Screen. Cambridge University Press, 2003.
