= Alma Dahlerup =

Danish-American philanthropist (1874–1969)

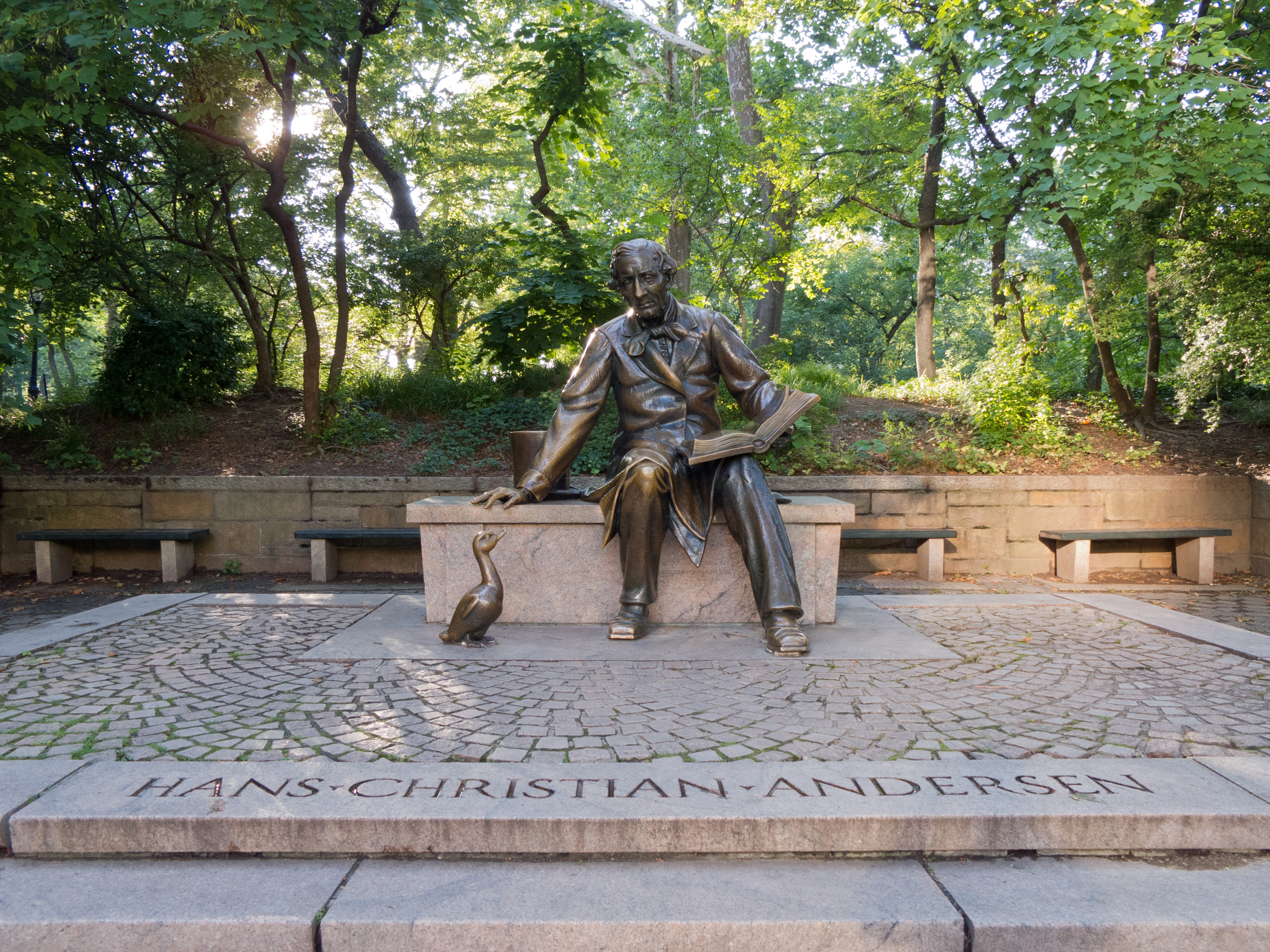
Statue of Hans Christian Andersen in Central Park proposed by Alma Dahlerup

Baroness Alma Dahlerup née Bech-Brøndom (1874–1969) was a Danish-American philanthropist who supported Danish seamen in World War II through radio broadcasts and speaking assignments. As president of the Danish-American Women's Association, she is remembered in particular for proposing and raising funding for the statue of Hans Christian Andersen in New York's Central Park in memory of the 150th anniversary of his birth.

== Biography ==
Born in Randers on 4 June 1874, Alma Bech-Brøndom was the daughter of the telegraphist Jacob Anthoniensen Brøndum (1837–1921) and the wreath-maker Nielsine Petrine Bech (1839–1932). She was brought up in a modest home in Randers together with her elder sister Karin Michaëlis who became a journalist and novelist. When she had completed her school education, she served as a housemaid for a clergyman in the north of Jutland where, in addition to housekeeping, she learnt skills normally reserved for men, including painting, white-washing, varnishing and chopping wood. The clergyman also taught her French and astronomy.

On a trip to the United States in 1893, she met the influential Danish-American author Baron Joost Dahlerup. She married him in Cape Town on 12 February 1898 and they had two children: Ida-Gro (1899) and Joost (1911). After the birth of their first child, they emigrated to the United States where they both promoted Danish-American relations. In 1917, she founded the Danish Women's Civic League. She was an active member of the American Scandinavian Foundation, heading the Social Committee from 1919 to 1928.

For the Board of Education, she made radio broadcasts about Hans Christian Andersen and provided support for Danish seamen during the German occupation of Denmark in World War II. In 1939, in connection with the New York World's Fair, she organized a presentation on the Danish Colony Garden which was subsequently moved to Staten Island where she founded the Danish Colony Garden Cooperative Society. In 1957, for this initiative she was honoured with the Danish Medal of Merit. From 1951, she was a board member of the Danish American Broadcasting Committee.

Her efforts to acquaint Americans with Hans Christian Andersen continued with radio broadcasts and readings of his fairy tales for American children. There were recognized by Danny Kaye who sent her his recording of "The Ugly Duckling" song in 1952. In her role as founder (1929) and honorary president of the Danish-American Women's Association, she suggested a statue of Andersen should be placed in New York's Central Park in commemoration of the 150th anniversary of his birthday. Thanks to her fund-raising efforts, a bronze statue designed by the American Sculptor Georg Lober was unveiled by Dahlerup in 1956. It depicts Andersen sitting on a bench, reading "The Ugly Duckling". The plaque behind the statue reads: "Sponsored by the Danish-American Women's Association, Baroness Alma Dahlerup—Founder."

Alma Dahlerup died in New York on 31 January 1969.

== Awards and distinctions ==
Alma Dahlerup received several high-level awards and distinctions:

- 1946: King Christian X's Liberty Medal
- 1955: Knight of the Order of the Dannebrog
- 1955: Medal of Honor for Women of Achievement
- 1957, the Danish Medal of Merit
