= Phantoms of Happiness =

1930 film

- Karina Bell
- Directed by: Reinhold Schünzel
- Written by: Reinhold Schünzel
- Produced by: Reinhold Schünzel
- Starring: Michael Chekhov; Karina Bell; Gaston Modot; Oskar Sima
- Cinematography: Nicolas Farkas
- Music by: Artur Guttmann
- Production company: Terra Film
- Distributed by: Terra Film
- Release date: 2 January 1930
- Country: Germany
- Languages: Silent; German intertitles

Phantoms of Happiness (German: Phantome des Glücks) is a 1930 German drama film directed by Reinhold Schünzel and starring Michael Chekhov, Karina Bell and Gaston Modot. It was originally made as a silent, then re-released in 1930 with an added soundtrack. The film's art direction was by Heinz Fenchel and Jacek Rotmil. It was shot at the Marienfelde Studios in Berlin and premiered at the city's Marmorhaus.

== Cast ==
- Michael Chekhov as Jacques Bramard
- Karina Bell as Marisa, a dancer
- Gaston Modot as Dupont
- Oskar Sima as J. Berré
- Ekkehard Arendt as René:, Vallon, Komponist
- Yvette Darnys as Frau Dupont
- Inge Landgut as Madeleine
- Leonard Steckel as Gefängnisarzt

== Bibliography ==
- Prawer, S.S. Between Two Worlds: The Jewish Presence in German and Austrian Film, 1910-1933. Berghahn Books, 2005.
