= Alma Hinding =

Danish actress

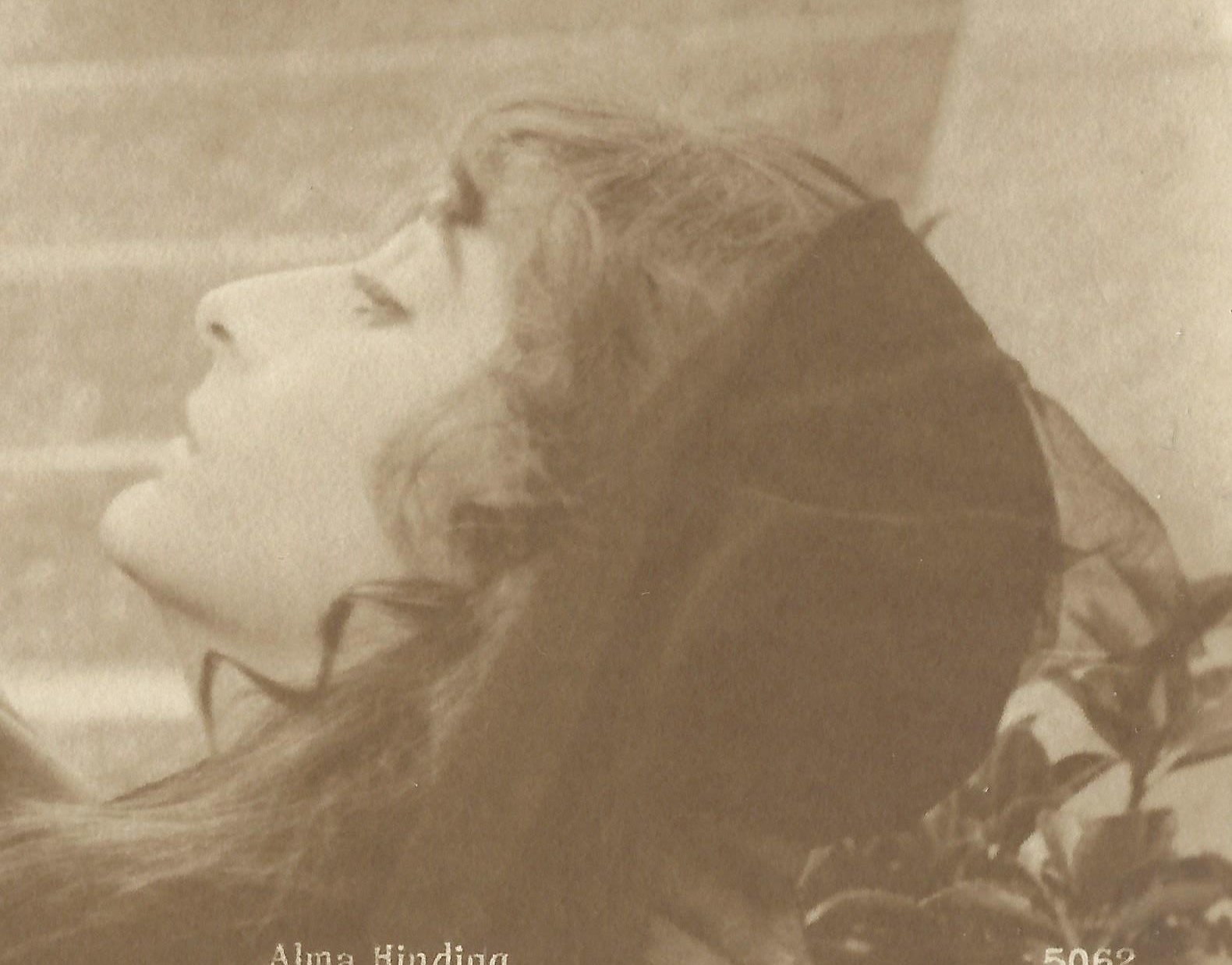
- Born: 11 February 1882; Svendborg, Denmark
- Died: 24 December 1981 (aged 99)
- Occupation: Actress
- Years active: 1911–1922 (film)

Alma Hinding (11 February 1882–24 December 1981) was a Danish film actress of the silent era. She acted in films for Nordisk Film during its most successful period.

== Selected filmography ==
- Atlantis (1913)
- The Secret of the Desert (1918)

== Bibliography ==
- Milne, Tom. The Cinema of Carl Dreyer. A. S. Barnes, 1971.
