= Valdemar Psilander =

Danish actor (1884–1917)

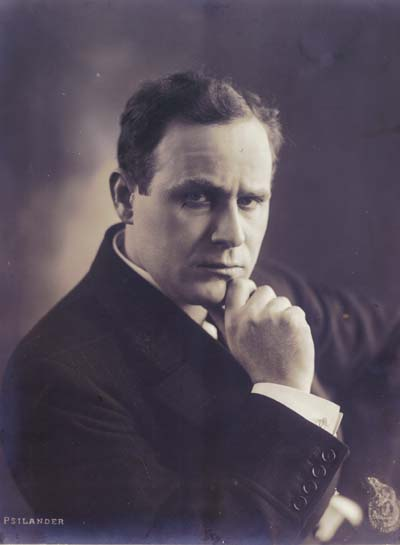
- Born: Valdemar Einar Psilander; 9 May 1884; Copenhagen, Denmark
- Died: 6 March 1917 (aged 32); Copenhagen, Denmark
- Occupation: Actor
- Years active: 1910–1917
- Spouse: Edith Buemann

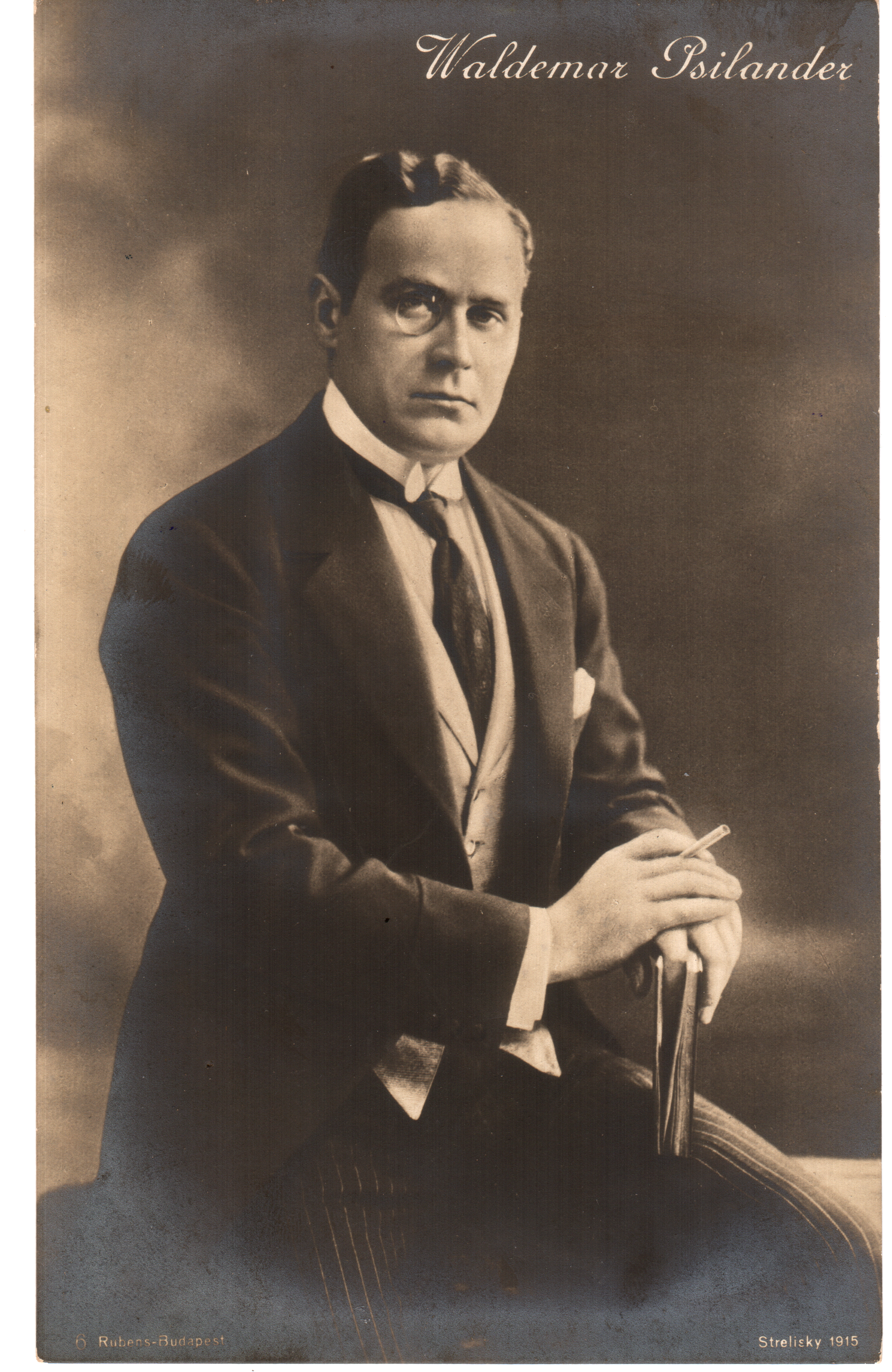
Valdemar Psilander in 1915

Valdemar Einar Psilander (9 May 1884 – 6 March 1917) was a Danish silent film actor, who was the highest-paid performer of his period and received critical acclaim as the greatest male lead during the golden era of Danish cinema.

== Biography ==
=== Early life ===
Valdemar Psilander was born in Copenhagen on 9 May 1884. At the age of 15, he was employed as an apprentice actor at the Casino theater in Copenhagen and performed at both the Frederiksberg and Dagmar Theaters through 1909. His stage performances were not particularly notable.

=== Film career ===
Psilander debuted on screen in the fall of 1910 in The Portrait of Dorian Gray for a small film company, Regia Kunst Film. He was immediately hired away by Nordisk Film to perform in August Blom's Ved Fængslets Port (At the Prison Gates). Psilander's charismatic performance earned him great praise and he quickly became Nordisk's highest-paid actor. Within two years, he was named the most popular male actor in film magazine readership polls around the world. During the course of the next six years, Psilander made 83 films. In a 2023 documentary about Psilander's life film historian Casper Tybjerg said that Psilander was one of the world's first and biggest film stars. He often acted alongside Norwegian–Danish actress Else Frölich.

In 1911, Nordisk Film had a fine international reputation and a wide distribution network, but it was Psilander's films which spearheaded the company's sales. He was especially popular among German, Russian and Hungarian audiences. He appeared in such films as Evangeliemandens Liv (The Candle and the Moth) directed by Holger-Madsen, and Klovnen directed by A. W. Sandberg, which was released after his death. Psilander's fees peaked in 1915, when he earned an annual salary of 100,000 DKK. (By comparison, the next highest paid star of the era, Olaf Fønss, received 14,000 DKK).

Psilander seldom granted interviews. In a rare newspaper interview from 1913, he spoke about his acting method: "We so often see fine stage actors become nothing on film because they don't understand that it depends upon concentration. The interesting thing about film is that we play to all social classes and in all parts of the world. We must in our means of expression appear nearly primitively genuine, truly original. One can perhaps learn to become an actor but you can never learn to be filmed. Studied emotions on film become artificial and false. Film relentlessly demands truthfulness and sincerity."

=== Marriage and death ===
Psilander married actress Edith Buemann. On 6 March 1917, Psilander was found dead at age 32 in his suite at the Hotel Bristol in Copenhagen. The official cause of death was cardiac arrest. However, rumors circulated that he had committed suicide. He was buried at the Taarbæk Kirkegård.

== Selected filmography ==
The Clown

- The Portrait of Dorian Gray (Axel Strøm, 1910)
- The Black Dream (Urban Gad, 1911) as Count Johan Waldberg
- At the Prison Gates (August Blom, 1911) as Aage Hellertz
- A Victim of the Mormons (August Blom, 1911) as Andrew Larson, Mormon Priest
- The Great Circus Catastrophe (Eduard Schnedler-Sørensen, 1912) as Count Willy von Rosenörn
- Livets Baal (Eduard Schnedler-Sørensen, 1912) as Herbert Jyrtel Professor of Chemistry
- The Strike at the Old Factory (Robert Dinesen, 1913) as Hans
- The Evangelist's Life (Holger-Madsen, 1915) as John Redmond, Evangelist
- Poison Arrow (August Blom, 1916) as Edmond Vernon, Detective
- The Clown (A.W. Sandberg, 1917) as The Clown Joe Higgins
- The Secret of the Desert (1918)
