= Mathilde Nielsen =

Danish actress

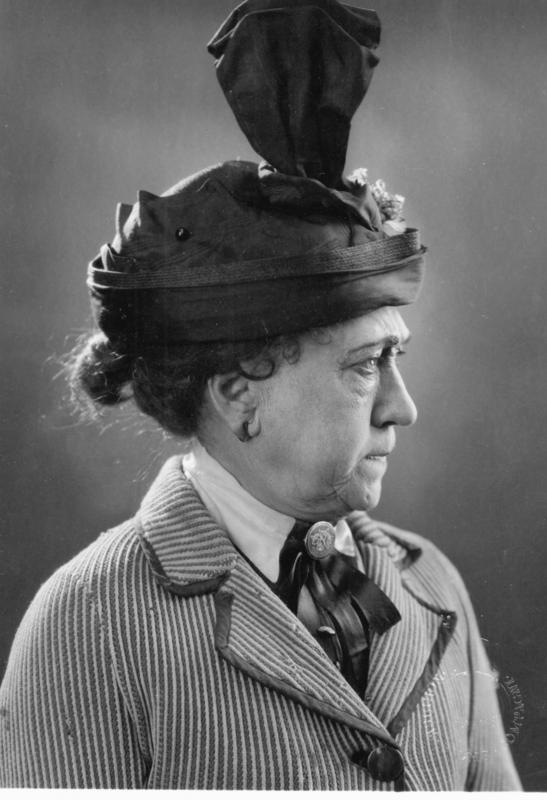
- Born: 26 October 1858; Copenhagen, Denmark
- Died: 11 September 1945 (aged 86); Denmark

Mathilde Nielsen (26 October 1858 – 11 September 1945) was a Danish actress in the theatre and in Danish cinema. She was known as a figure of matriarchy in Danish film.

== Selected filmography ==
- Hævnens nat 1916
- Prästänkan 1920
- Lykkens galoscher 1921
- David Copperfield 1922
- Paa slaget 12 1924
- Lille Dorrit 1924
- Det store hjerte 1925
- Du skal ære din hustru 1925
- Det sovende hus 1926
- The Clown 1926
- Lykkehjulet 1927
- Den sørgmuntre barber 1927
- The Vicar of Vejlby 1931
- Kirke og orgel 1932
- Skal vi vædde en million? 1932
- De blaa drenge 1933
- Nyhavn 17 1933
- 7-9-13 1934
- Ud i den kolde sne 1934
- Millionærdrengen 1936
- Kongen bød 1938
- Skilsmissens børn 1939
- Sommerglæder 1940
- Tante Cramers testamente 1941
- Tobiasnætter 1941
- Tror du jeg er født i går? 1941
- Tyrannens fald 1942
