= Millionærdrengen =

1936 film

- Directed by: A. W. Sandberg
- Written by: Kjeld Abell; Walter Christmas
- Starring: Karen Caspersen
- Cinematography: Carlo Bentsen
- Release date: 3 March 1936
- Running time: 101 minutes
- Country: Denmark
- Language: Danish

Millionærdrengen is a 1936 Danish family film directed by A. W. Sandberg starring Karen Caspersen.

== Cast ==
- Karen Caspersen as Tante Fanny Rowly
- Sigurd Langberg as Formynder Mickens
- Peter Malberg as Major Plummer
- Tove Arni as Dolly Plummer
- Ebbe Rode as Ralph
- Karen Lykkehus as Bess
- Finn Mannu as John Rowly
- Mathilde Nielsen
- Ellen Rovsing
- Astrid Neumann
- Petrine Sonne as Pantelåner
- Charles Wilken
- William Bewer
- Eigil Reimers
- Aage Hertel
- Poul Müller as Mand John overnatter hos
- Poul Reichhardt as Mand på plakat
- Henry Nielsen as Fuld sømand
- Ole Bruun as Den artige dreng
- Morten Kiel as Avisdrengen
