= The Secret of the Desert =

1918 film directed by Robert Dinesen

- Directed by: Robert Dinesen
- Written by: Alfred Kjerulf; A.V. Olsen
- Production company: Nordisk Film
- Distributed by: Nordisk Film
- Release date: 4 March 1918
- Country: Denmark
- Languages: Silent; Danish intertitles

The Secret of the Desert (Danish: Sfinxenx Hemmelighed) is a 1918 Danish silent film directed by Robert Dinesen.

The film's sets were designed by Carlo Jacobsen.

== Cast ==
- Alma Hinding as Annie
- Thorleif Lund as Mr. Lawson
- Axel Mattson
- Valdemar Psilander as Mr. Hunter
- Franz Skondrup
- Agis Winding as Lady Trenton

== Bibliography ==
- Jennifer M. Bean, Laura Horak & Anupama Kapse. Silent Cinema and the Politics of Space. Indiana University Press, 2014.
