= Karen Caspersen =

Danish actress (1890–1941)

- Born: 20 August 1890; Copenhagen, Denmark
- Died: 14 May 1941 (aged 50); Copenhagen, Denmark
- Occupation: Actress
- Years active: 1910–1939
- Spouse: A. W. Sandberg (m. 1911; div. 1916)

Karen Caspersen (20 August 1890 – 14 May 1941) was a Danish actress. She appeared in more than 30 films between 1910 and 1939. She was credited as Karen Sandberg in the Danish version of Blind Justice (1916), as well as Katherine Sanders in the US Version.

== Selected filmography ==
- The Mysterious X (1914)
- Blind Justice (1916)
- David Copperfield (1922)
- Little Dorrit (1924)
- The Clown (1926)
- Hotel Paradis (1931)
- Millionærdrengen (1936)
