= Carlo Jacobsen =

Danish art director (1884–1960)

- Born: 10 June 1884; Nørrebro, Copenhagen, Denmark
- Died: 17 October 1960 (aged 76); Brønshjø, Denmark
- Occupation: Art director
- Years active: 1913-1947 (film)

Carlo Jacobsen (10 June 1884 – 17 October 1960) was a Danish art director.

== Selected filmography ==
- The Secret of the Desert (1918)
- A Trip to Mars (1918)
- David Copperfield (1922)
- Little Dorrit (1924)
- Mists of the Past (1925)
- The Clown (1926)

== Bibliography ==
- Carl Theodor Dreyer. Four Screenplays. Indiana University Press, 1970.
