= Karin Michaëlis =

Danish journalist and author

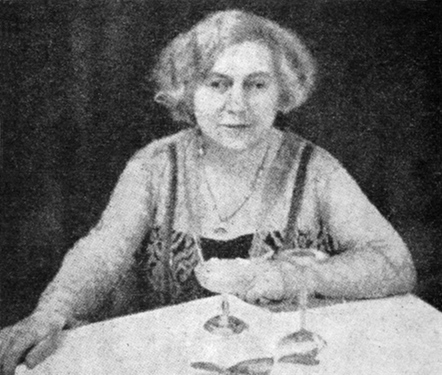
- Karin Michaëlis, ca. 1931
- Born: Katharina Bech-Brøndum; March 20, 1872; Randers, Denmark
- Died: January 11, 1950 (aged 77); Copenhagen, Denmark
- Other names: Karin Michaëlis Strangeland
- Occupation(s): journalist, author
- Spouse(s): Sophus Michaëlis (m. 1895; div. 1911); Charles Emil Stangeland (m. 1912; sep. 1917)
- Relatives: Alma Dahlerup (sister)

Signature
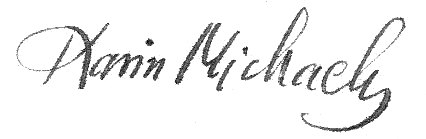

Karin Michaëlis (20 March 1872 – 11 January 1950) was a Danish journalist and author. She is best known for her novels, short stories, and children's books. Over the course of 50 years, Karin Michaëlis wrote more than 50 books in Danish, German, and English. Her works have been translated into more than 23 languages from their original Danish. Her works are published under several names, including her last name from her second marriage: Karin Michaëlis Stangeland.

Michaëlis' most famous novel, The Dangerous Age (Danish: Den farlige Alder), has been championed as a groundbreaking work on women's rights. It has since been adapted for film several times.

== Personal life ==
Michaëlis was born March 1872 in Randers, Denmark as Katharina Bech-Brøndum. She was the daughter of a telegraph official and noted Freemason, Jacob Anthonius Brøndum (1837–1921), and Nielsine Petrine Bech (1839–1932). She was brought up together with her younger sister, the later philanthropist Alma Dahlerup, in their modest home in Randers where her mother contributed to the family's meager income by making wreaths. Her grandmother and an aunt played a large role in her early upbringing. In school she was teased because she was small, chubby, and suffered from strabismus.

In her youth, Michaëlis was a private teacher for a few years, partly in Læsø and partly in a manor house north of Randers. In 1892 she moved to Copenhagen to train as a piano teacher. While there, she became acquainted with the writer Sophus Michaëlis (1865–1932), whom she married in 1895. The couple earned their living predominantly through theater reviews. Their marriage was terminated in 1911.

The following year, Michaëlis married the Norwegian-American diplomat Charles Emil Stangeland in New Rochelle, New York. She had met Stangeland the previous year while returning from the United States to Denmark aboard a ship. He was a political economist, educated at Columbia University. At the time of their marriage, he was posted to Bolivia as secretary to the American Legation. Stangeland was unhappy with the literary and political activities of his wife, who had recently experienced a breakthrough as an author with The Dangerous Age. They became separated in 1917.

Michaëlis died on January 11, 1950, in Copenhagen. She is buried at Thurø cemetery on the island of Funen.

== Career ==
In 1910 she published The Dangerous Age (Danish: Den farlige Alder). It is the story of Elsie Lindtner, who, after divorcing her husband, attempts to rekindle a relationship with a younger man who had once worshipped her from afar. When this relationship fails as well, she resolves to spend her life traveling throughout the world with a female friend. The book created a great sensation, because it began to cut through tabooed themes like the sexual desires of a 40-year-old woman. The novel was translated into several languages, including English. It has been adapted into film several times, including a 1911 version directed by August Blom: Den farlige Alder, and a 1927 German version directed by Eugen Illés titled That Dangerous Age. In 1912, Michaëlis published a sequel to the novel named after the series' title character: Elsie Lindtner.

Among the articles she wrote for American magazines were a two-part series for Munsey's Magazine in 1913, entitled "Why Are Women Less Truthful Than Men," and an interview with Woodrow Wilson for Living Age magazine in 1925: "On President Wilson's Trail."

In 1914, Glaedens Skole (English: School of Joy) was published. The story centered on a reform school in Vienna led by her friend, the Austrian pedagogue Eugenie Schwarzwald. Michaëlis also wrote a series of coming of age books about the a girl called Bibi. The Bibi books came in seven volumes between 1929 and 1939 and were an international success. In these novels for adolescents, readers meet the stationmaster's daughter Bibi, who is motherless but enjoys some freedom as a result. She is an idealistic tomboy who goes on train excursions on her own (with a free ticket due to her father's job) and fights ceaselessly for animal causes. Translators of Bibi include the English poet Rose Fyleman and Austrian novelist and dramatist Maria Lazar.

In 1927, she was awarded with the Tagea Brandts Rejselegat.

During World War I, Michaëlis was active in humanitarian work in Austria. Her friendship with Eugenie Schwarzwald stood not only for her connection with Vienna but also for her social engagement in this country. Early on, she warned of the danger arising from Mussolini and Hitler. In 1932 she took part in an anti-war congress in Amsterdam where she advocated conscientious objection and peace education for children. From 1933 on she took in German emigrants on her property in Thurø, including Bertolt Brecht and his wife Helene Weigel and their friend Maria Lazar, who remained in Denmark until 1939. After the rise of fascism, her books were banned in Germany and Italy. In 1940, with the invasion of Denmark, she emigrated to America. She returned to Denmark in 1946 after the end of World War II.

Michaëlis' two autobiographies, Little Troll and Wonderful World (Danish: Vidunderlige Verden), were published in the 1940s. She had previously written about her childhood experiences in Pigen med Glasskaarene, the first volume of her series Træet på Godt og Ondt, which was written in the period between 1924 and 1930. The series also included including Lille Løgnerske, Hemmeligheden, Synd og Sorg og Fare, and Følgerne.

== Bibliography ==
- Højt Spil, 1898
- Fattig i Aanden, 1901
- Birkedommeren, 1901 (English: The Governor, 1913)
- Barnet, 1902 (English: The Child Andrea, 1904)
- Lillemor, 1902
- Sønnen: Fortælling, 1903
- Hellig Enfold, 1903
- Backfische, sommerfortælling af Trold, 1904
- Gyda, 1904
- Munken gaar i Enge, 1905
- De smaa Mennesker, 1906
- Tommelise: Fortælling, 1906
- Ghettoens Blomst, 1907 (under the pseudonym Edmond Ralph)
- Over al Forstand: Fortælling, 1907
- Kyllinesorger: En lille Roman, 1907
- Betty Rosa: En ung Kvindes Roman, 1908
- Tro som Guld: Fortælling, 1909
- Den farlige Alder: Breve og Dagbogsoptegnelser, 1910 (English: The Dangerous Age: Letters and Fragments from a Woman's Diary, 1912)
- Kvindehjerter, 1910 (published anonymously with Betty Nansen)
- Danske Forgangsmand i Amerika, 1911
- Bogen om Kærlighed, 1912
- Elsie Lindtner, 1912
- Grev Sylvains Hævn, 1913
- Glædens Skole, 1914
- Hjertets Drømme: Fortælling, 1915
- En Mo'rs Øjne: Skuespil i fire Akter, 1915
- Krigens Øfre, 1916
- Atter det skilte—Novelle, 1918
- Don Juan—efter Døden, 1919
- Lille unge Kone, 1921
- Mette Trap og hendes Unger, 1922 (English: Venture's End, 1927)
- Syv Søstre sad, 1923
- Træet paa Godt og Ondt, 1924–1930 (series)
- Kvindelil din Tror er stor, 1925
- Bibi, a Little Danish Girl, 1927 (Danish: Bibi, 1929)
- Perlerne, 1927 (English: The Pearl Necklace)
- Familie Worm, 1928 (originally published in German, Danish: Familien Worm, 1933)
- Pigen der smilede, 1929
- Bibis store Rejse, en lille Piges Liv, 1930 (English: Bibi Goes travelling, 1934)
- Hjertets Vagabond, 1930
- Justine, 1931
- Bibi og Ole, en lille Piges Liv, 1931
- Bibi og de Sammensvorne, 1932
- Mor, 1935
- The Green Island, 1935 (Danish: Den grønne Ø, 1937)
- Bibi paa Ferie, 1935
- Lotte Ligeglad, 1936
- Bibi bliver Landmand, 1939
- Bibi og Valborg, 1939
- Little Troll, 1946
