= The Clown (1926 film) =

1926 film

- Directed by: A.W. Sandberg
- Written by: Poul Knudsen; A.W. Sandberg
- Starring: Gösta Ekman; Karina Bell; Maurice de Féraudy
- Cinematography: Christen Jørgensen
- Production company: Nordisk Film
- Distributed by: Fotorama
- Release date: 30 October 1926
- Running time: 128 minutes
- Country: Denmark
- Languages: Silent; Danish intertitles

The Clown (1926)

The Clown (Danish: Klovnen) is a 1926 Danish silent drama film directed by A. W. Sandberg and starring Gösta Ekman, Karina Bell and Maurice de Féraudy. It is a remake of a 1917 film of the same title, also directed by Sandberg. The film's sets were designed by the art director Carlo Jacobsen.

== Cast ==
- Gösta Ekman as Joe Higgins
- Karina Bell as Daisy
- Maurice de Féraudy as circus director James Bunding
- Robert Schmidt as Marcel Phillipe
- Kate Fabian as Graciella
- Karen Caspersen
- Mathilde Nielsen
- Jacoba Jessen
- Holger Pedersen
- Eric Bertner as Pierre Beaumont
- Peter Nielsen
- Henry Seemann
- Philip Bech
- Edmonde Guy as Lilian Delrme
- Ernst Van Duren as
- Sigurd Langberg as Clown
- Torben Meyer as Butler

== Bibliography ==
- Thorsen, Isak. Nordisk Films Kompagni 1906-1924: The Rise and Fall of the Polar Bear. Indiana University Press, 2017.
