= A. W. Sandberg =

Danish film director and screenwriter

Anders Wilhelm Sandberg
- Born: 22 May 1887; Viborg, Denmark
- Died: 27 March 1938 (aged 50); Bad Nauheim, Germany
- Occupations: Film director, screenwriter
- Years active: 1914–1937
- Spouse(s): Karen Kragh Møller (m. 1911; div. 1916) Else Frölich (m. 1916, divorced) Ruth Helweg Jacobsen (m. 1935)

Anders Wilhelm Sandberg (22 May 1887 – 27 March 1938) was a Danish film director and screenwriter.

== Early life ==
Sandberg was born 22 May 1887 in Viborg, Denmark, the son of Otto Carl Sandberg, a merchant and his wife Anna Mathilde Wilian. He was educated as a bookhandler and then worked as a journalist and photographer for the weekly magazine Verdensspejlet (English: World's Mirror).

== Career ==
The Clown

Sandberg began in 1914 as a cinematographer and director for Nordisk Film. After directing a series of low-budget comedies, he directed his most acclaimed work: 1917's Klovnen (The Clown) starring Valdemar Psilander. The film's premiere two months after Psilander's sudden death created a media sensation which launched Sandberg's career. Between 1918 and 1927, Sandberg was the film company's leading director and succeeded August Blom as Nordisk's artistic director. During that period, his reputation was cemented by adaptations of Charles Dickens novels: Our Mutual Friend (1921), Great Expectations (1922), David Copperfield (1922) and Little Dorrit (1924). He produced 58 films of which he wrote 19. In 1926, Sandberg directed a remake of Kloven starring Gösta Ekman (senior) and Karina Bell. Following the switch to sound films in the 1930s, Sandberg restricted his film work to documentaries.

== Personal life ==
Sandberg was married to the actress Karen Kragh Møller from 1911 to 1916. In 1916, he married the actress Else Frölich. He was married a third time in 1935 to the German actress Ruth Helweg Jacobsen. Sandberg died 27 March 1938 while on vacation in Bad Nauheim, Germany.

He was the father of Danish film producer Henrik Sandberg.

== Selected filmography ==
- Millionærdrengen (1936)
- 7-9-13 (1934)
- 5 raske piger (1933)
- Den gule Danserinde (1931)
- The Last Night (1928)
- The Clown (1926)
- Maharajahens Yndlingshustru (1926)
- Fra Piazza del Popolo (1925)
- Little Dorrit (1924)
- Wienerbarnet (1924)
- Kan Kvinder fejle? (1924)
- Min Ven Privatdetektiven (1924)
- Kærligheds-Øen (1924)
- Morænen (1924)
- Lasse Månsson fra Skaane (1923)
- Nedbrudte Nerver (1923)
- Paa Slaget 12 (1923)
- Den sidste Dans (1923)
- Pigen fra Sydhavsøen (1922)
- Great Expectations (1922)
- David Copperfield (1922)
- Vor fælles Ven (1921)
- Kan disse Øjne lyve? (1921)
- Stodderprinsessen (1920)
- Kærlighedsvalsen (1920)
- Det døde Skib (1920)
- Kærlighedsleg (1919)
- Solskinsbørnene (1919)
- Kærlighedens Almagt (1919)
- Rytterstatuen (1919)
- The Mysterious Footprints (1918)
- Manden med Arret (1918)
- En Kunstners Kærlighed (1918)
- Klovnen (1917)
