= Charles Wilken =

Danish actor (1866–1956)

- Born: Charles Vilhelm Jonas Wilken; 8 November 1866; Denmark
- Died: 26 February 1956 (aged 89); Denmark
- Occupation: Actor
- Years active: 1916–1954

Charles Wilken (8 November 1866 – 26 February 1956) was a Danish male actor. He appeared in 32 films between 1916 and 1954.

== Selected filmography ==
- David Copperfield (1922)
- Millionærdrengen (1936)
- En mand af betydning (1941)
- Det ender med bryllup (1943)
- Melody of Murder (1944)
- Otte akkorder (1944)
