= Frederik Jensen =

Danish actor (1863–1934)

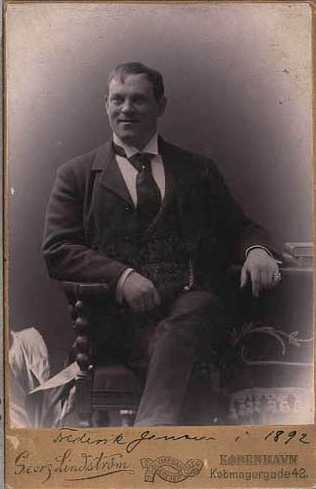
- Jensen in 1892
- Born: 25 June 1863; Nyborg, Denmark
- Died: 13 February 1934 (aged 70); Copenhagen, Denmark

Frederik Jensen (25 June 1863 – 14 February 1934) was a Danish stage and film actor.

He was involved in stage throughout much of his career, appearing in films during his final years.

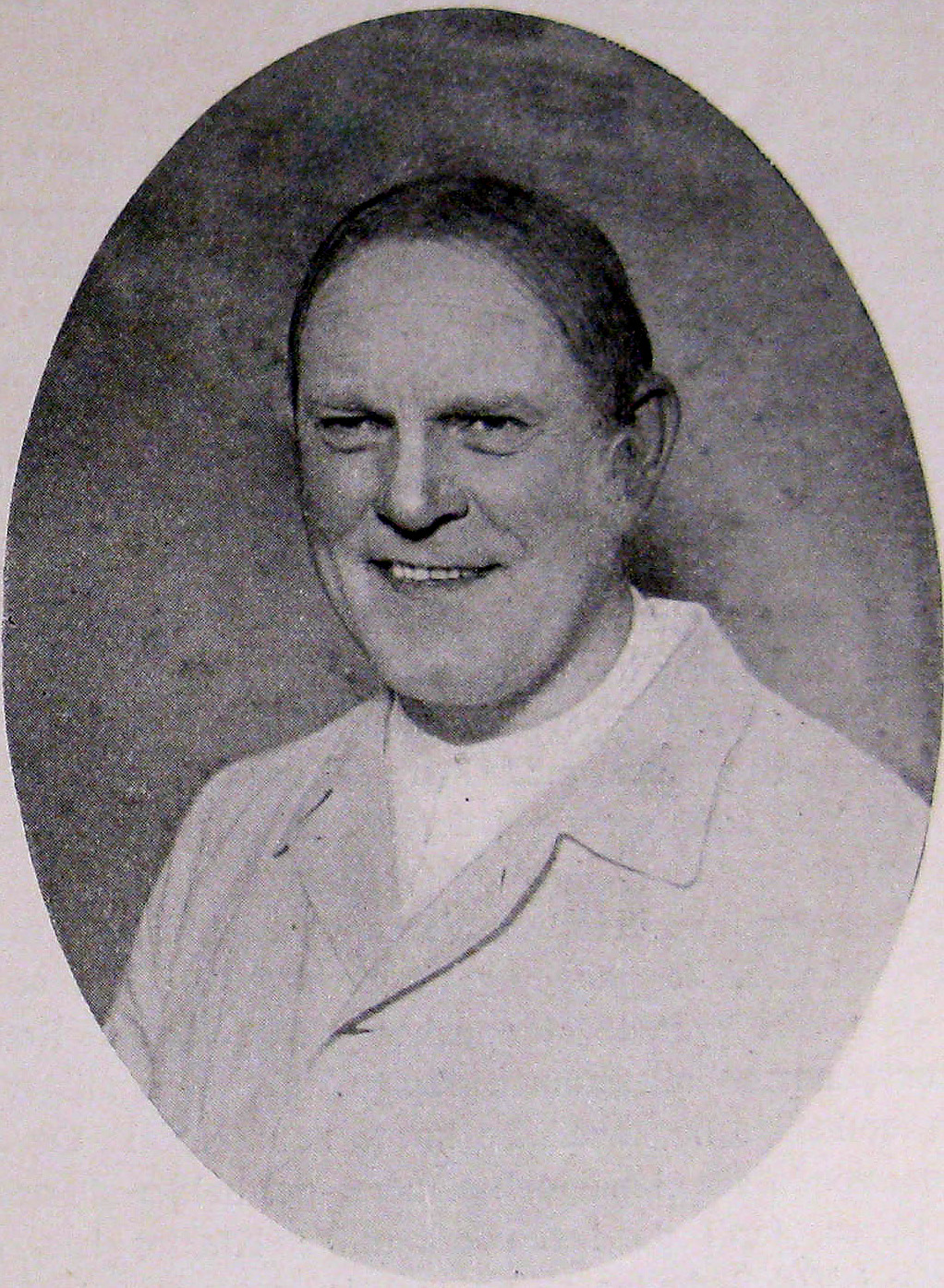
Frederik Jensen 1909

== Selected filmography ==
- En lille bitte mand (1909)
- København ved Nat (1910)
- Under kjærlighedens aak (1916)
- Her Secret (1919)
- David Copperfield (1922)
- Lille Dorrit (1923)
- Hesten (1931)
- Hesten (1931)
- Skal vi vædde en million? (1932)
- Tretten år (1932)
- Fem raske piger (1933)
- Nyhavn 17 (1933)
- Den ny husassistent (1933)
