= Sophus Michaëlis =

Danish poet, novelist and playwright (1865–1932)

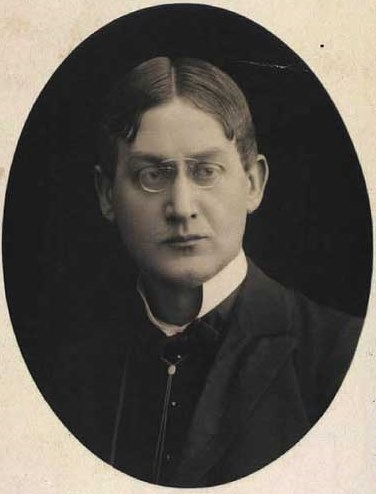
- Sophus Michaëlis ca. 1900
- Born: Sophus August Berthel Michaëlis; 14 May 1865; Odense, Denmark
- Died: 28 January 1932 (aged 66); Copenhagen, Denmark
- Spouse(s): Karin Michaëlis (m. 1895; div. 1911); Astrid Nyström (m. 1911; div. 1921); Louise Luci Charlotte Peschardt (m. 1921)

Sophus Michaëlis (1865–1932) was a Danish poet, novelist and playwright. His works were translated, published, and performed in England, France, Germany, and Sweden during his lifetime, in addition to his native Denmark.

== Personal life ==
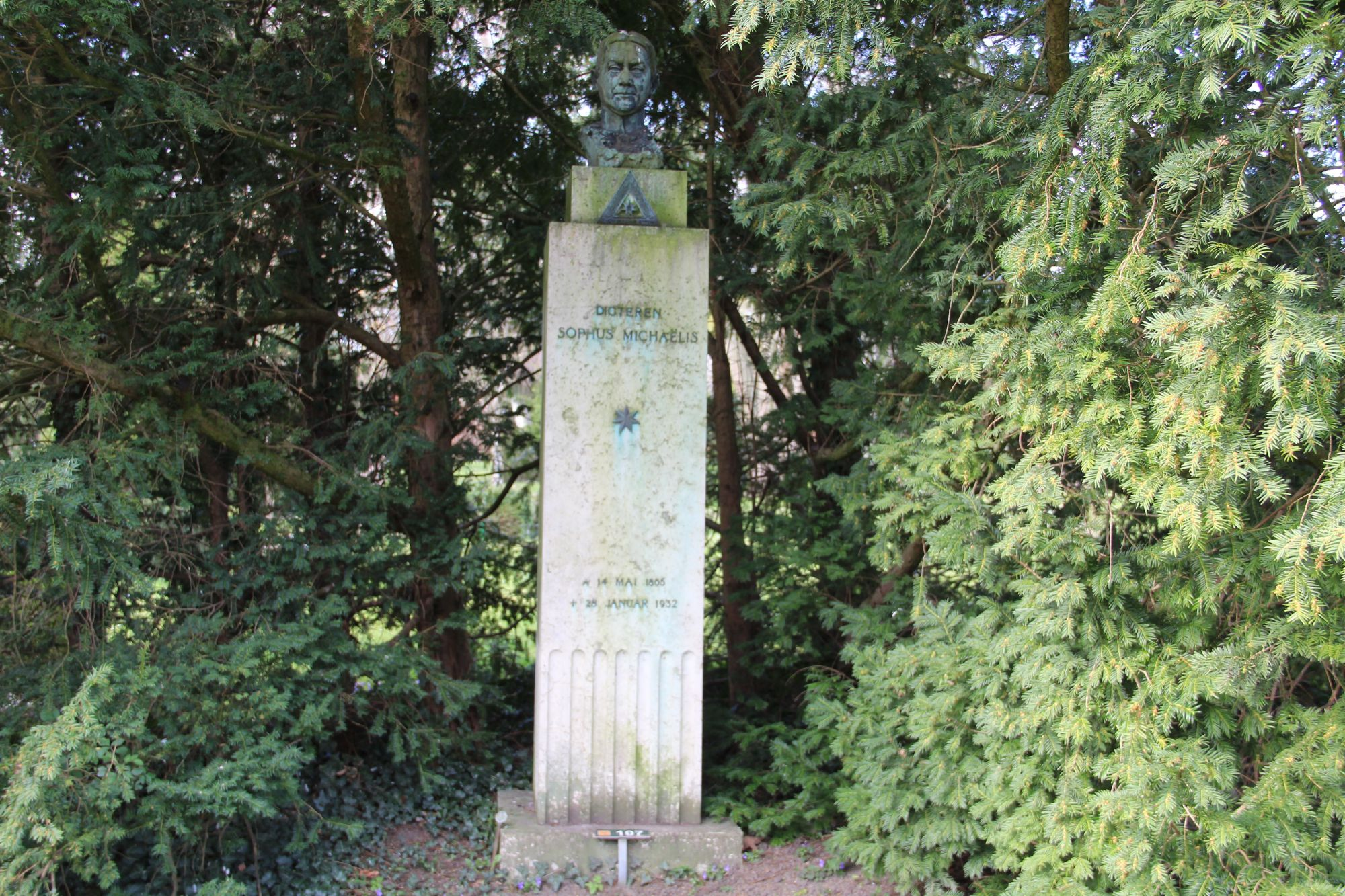
Michaelis' tomb at Copenhagen's Western Cemetery.

Sophus August Berthel Michaëlis was born in Odense on 14 May 1865 to Hedevig Greve and Johan August Michaëlis, a tailor. He studied in Odense and received a cand.mag. degree in 1891. In the course of his studies he was taught by Georg Brandes and Julius Lange.

He was married to Karin Michaëlis, whom he had met while she was training in Copenhagen as a piano teacher. The couple were married in 1895 and initially earned their living predominantly through theater reviews. Their marriage was terminated in 1911. In November 1911, Michaëlis married Astrid Nyström, with whom he divorced in 1921. He was married a third time to Louise Luci Charlotte Peschardt in December 1921.

Michaëlis died on 28 January 1932 in Copenhagen, and is buried at Vestre Cemetery.

== Career ==
Michaëlis contributed to several operas and theatrical works over the course of his career. he wrote the libretto for August Enna's opera Aucasin og Nicolette, which was performed at the Royal Danish Theatre. In 1898 he wrote the libretto for an opera titled Portia in collaboration with Carl Nielsen, which was based on William Shakespeare's The Merchant of Venice. It became much delayed on Nielsen's end, and was ultimately never produced. Despite this, Nielsen went on to compose the music to five of Michaëlis' other productions.

As a reporter in Copenhagen, Michaëlis wrote reviews on literature, fine art, and performances. In particular, he wrote a variety of theater reviews on performances in Copenhagen. One of the publications he contributed during this period was Taarnet published between 1893 and 1894. He was an editor for the newspaper Tidens Krav from 1896 to 1898, and was later an editor for the magazine Kunst from 1900 until 1906.

Over the course of his career, Michaëlis published a number of Danish translations of other authors' poetry. He published a translation of Gustave Flaubert's Salammbô in 1902, and The Temptation of Saint Anthony (Danish: Den hellige Antonios Fristelser) in 1904. In 1917 he authored a translation of Wolfram von Eschenbach's Parzival. Between 1924 and 1928 he released a translation of Goethe's Faust.

In addition to his work as a translator, reviewer, and lyricist, Michaëlis authored several original novels. His 1912 novel, The Eternal Sleep (Danish: Den evige søvn) described Napoleon's march into Russia and his eventual defeat there. The novel, though popular elsewhere, garnered strict criticism in Russia.

Michaëlis became a member of the Order of the Dannebrog in 1919 and was further awarded the Dannebrogordenens Hæderstegn in 1929. He was the chairman of the Danish Authors' Society (Danish: Dansk forfatterforening) from 1915 until his death. The Society founded a scholarship in his memory in 1937.

== Bibliography ==
- Digte, 1889
- Synd, 1891
- Vanemennesker, 1892
- Solblomster, 1893
- Æbelø, 1895
- Aucassin og Nicolette, 1896 (lyrics)
- Sirener, 1898
- Dødedansen, 1900
- Livets Fest, 1900
- Giovanna, 1901
- Palmerne, 1904
- Billedhuggeren Jens Adolph Jerichau, 1906
- Revolutionsbryllup, 1906
- Lægen, 1906
- St. Helena, 1910
- Den evige søvn, 1912
- Blaaregn, 1913
- Hellener og Barbar, 1914
- Træbukken, 1918
- Vilhelm Hammershøi, 1918
- Dommeren, 1921
- Himmelskibet, 1921
- Romersk Foraar, 1921
