= Else Frölich =

Norwegian-Danish star of silent film (1880–1960)

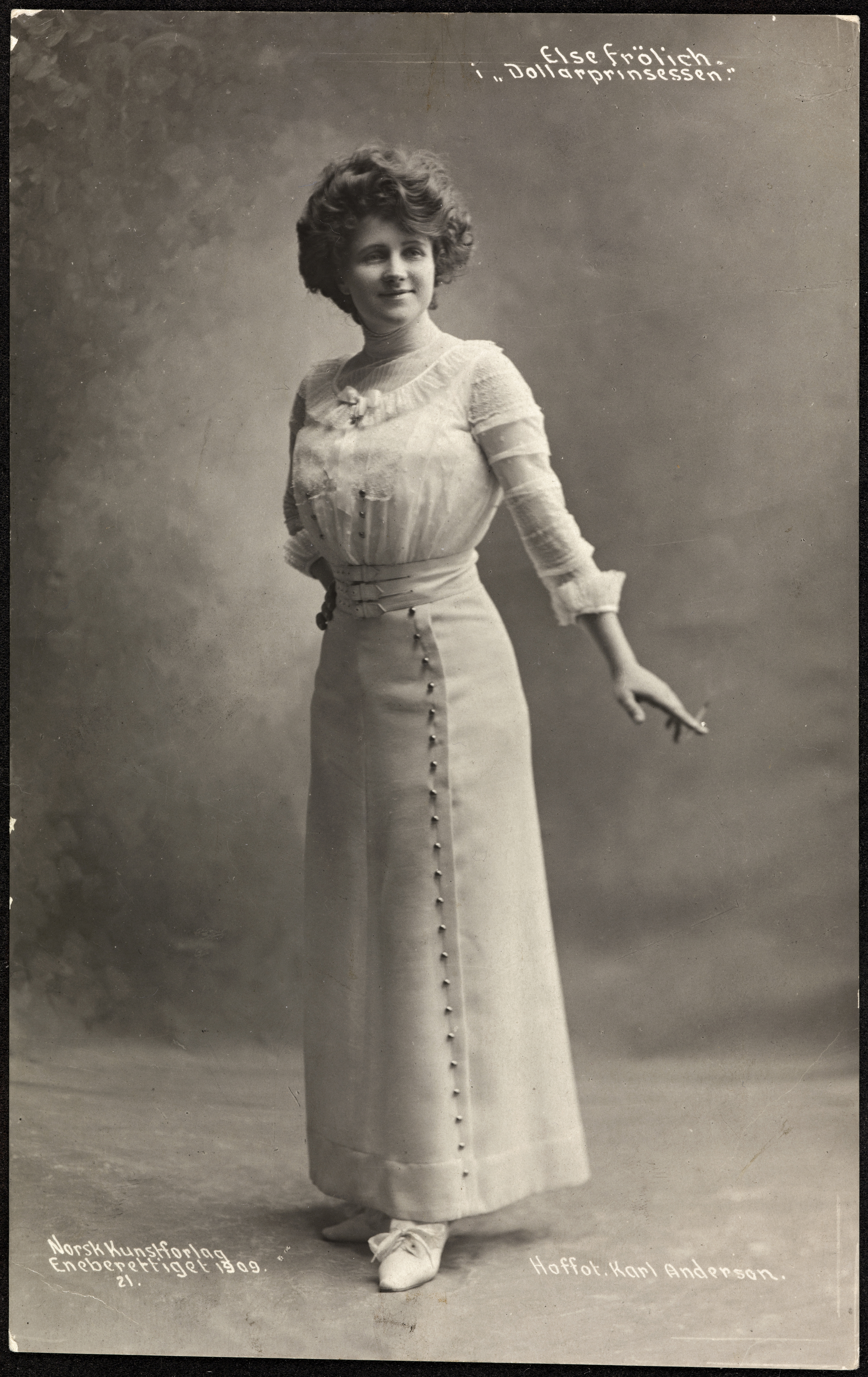
- Frölich in 1909
- Born: August 31, 1880; Paris, France
- Died: September 15, 1960 (aged 80); Copenhagen, Denmark
- Spouse(s): Louis de la Cruz Frölich (m. 1903; div. 1904) A. W. Sandberg (m. 1916, divorced)
- Children: 1
- Father: Frits Thaulow

Else Frölich (August 31, 1880 – September 15, 1960) was a Norwegian–Danish star of silent film.

== Biography ==
She was born Eli Marie Thaulow to a Danish mother, Ingeborg Charlotte Gad (1852–1908), and a Norwegian father, the impressionist painter Frits Thaulow. Her paternal grandfather was the wealthy Norwegian pharmacist Harald Thaulow (1815–1881). Her brother was the Norwegian author Harald Thaulow (1887–1971), who wrote under the pseudonym John Hell.

She often acted for the Danish Nordisk Film company, starring alongside Danish actor Valdemar Psilander.

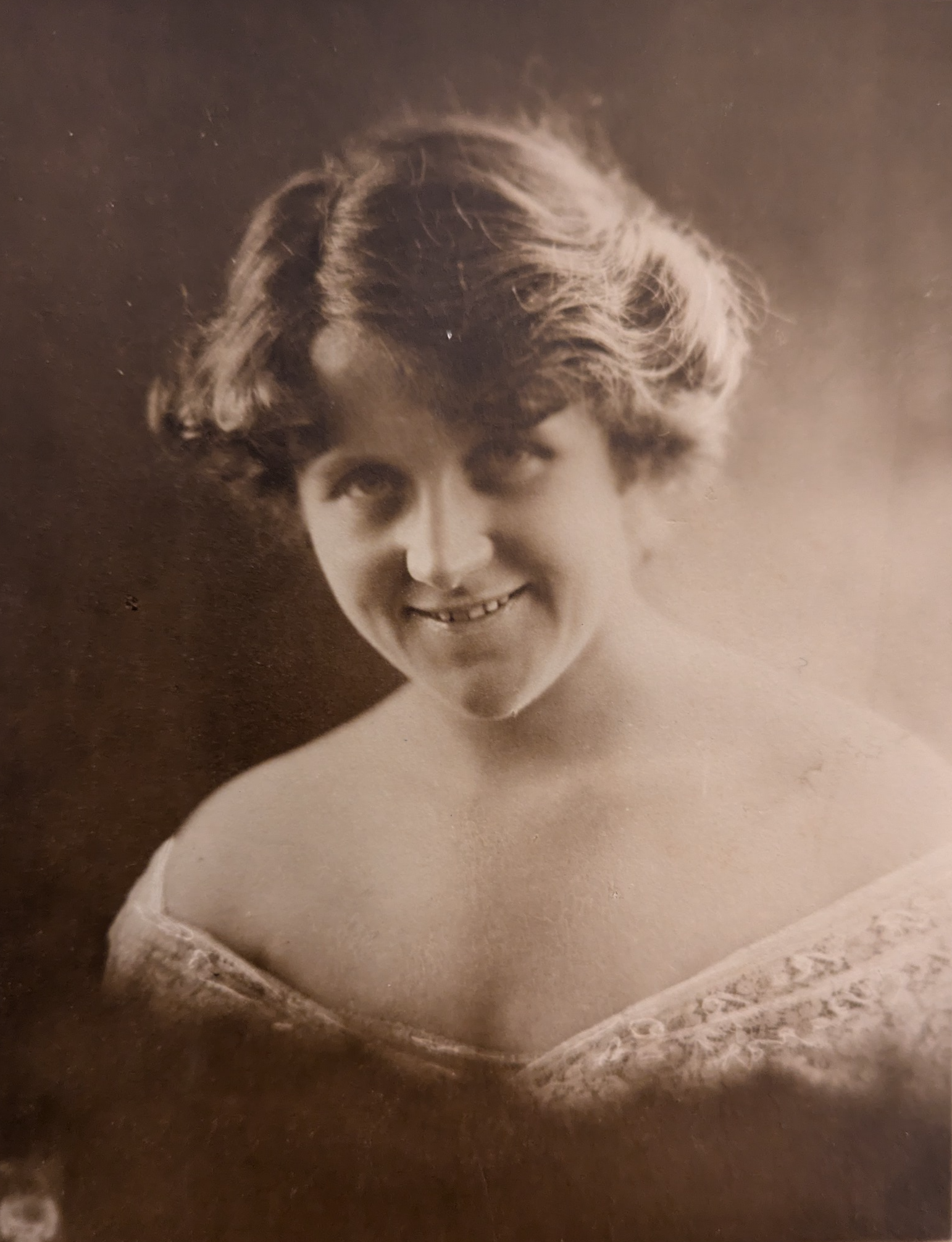
From the film star portrait house Photochemie Berlin (fl. 1914–1919)

== Personal life ==
On June 9, 1903, she married Danish opera singer Louis de la Cruz Frölich (1872–1952), an internationally known interpreter of the works of Wagner. They had one daughter, Ingeborg, in 1904, and divorced after being married for only a year. In 1916 she married Danish film director and screenwriter A. W. Sandberg (1887–1938), and they, too, divorced.
