= Little Dorrit (1924 film) =

1924 film

- Directed by: A.W. Sandberg
- Written by: Charles Dickens (novel); Sam Ask
- Cinematography: Louis Larsen; Einar Olsen
- Production company: Nordisk Film
- Distributed by: Nordisk Film
- Release date: 26 December 1924
- Country: Denmark
- Languages: Silent; Danish intertitles

Little Dorrit (Danish: Lille Dorrit) is a 1924 Danish silent historical drama film directed by A.W. Sandberg and starring Frederik Jensen, Karina Bell and Karen Winther. It is based on the 1857 Charles Dickens' novel of the same name.

The film was made as part of an attempt to re-establish Danish cinema in the English-speaking world. While successful in Scandinavia, the film failed to do well in Britain and America.

The film's art direction was by Carlo Jacobsen.

== Cast ==
- Frederik Jensen as William Dorrit
- Karina Bell as Amy, genannt Klein Dorrit, sein Kind
- Karen Winther as Fanny, ihre Schwester
- Knud Schrøder as Tip, ihr Bruder
- Georg Busch as Frederik Dorrit
- Gunnar Tolnæs as Arthur Clennam
- Ingeborg Pehrson as Mrs. Clennam, seine Mutter
- Carl Hinz as Jeremias Flintwich & Efraim Flintwich
- Mathilde Nielsen as Afferty, Efraims Frau
- Torben Meyer as Hauptschließer Chivery
- Kate Fabian as Seine Frau
- Erik Skold Petersen as John
- Karen Caspersen as Maggy
- Peter Nielsen as Rigaud
- Kai Paaske as Pancks

== Bibliography ==
- Glavin, John. Dickens on Screen. Cambridge University Press, 2003.
