= Karina Bell =

Danish actress (1898–1979)

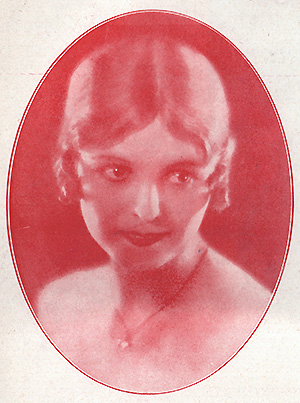
- In an advertisement in the Swedish magazine Scenen in 1928.
- Born: Karen Gudrun Louise Hansen; 26 September 1898; Hellerup, Denmark
- Died: 5 June 1979 (aged 80); Helsingør, Denmark
- Other name: Karen Gudrun Louise Parkov
- Occupation: Actress
- Years active: 1919–1933 (film)

Karina Bell (born Karen Gudrun Louise Hansen; 26 September 1898 – 5 June 1979) was a Danish actress. She primarily worked as a film actress and was active from 1919 to 1933. Bell was credited in at least 21 Danish, German, and Swedish films during her career.

== Life ==
Karen Gudrun Louise Hansen was born on 26 September 1898 in Hellerup, Denmark. Her mother was Anette Marie Hansen (1865–1928) and her father, Hans Peter Hansen (1856–1932), worked at the Tuborg Brewery. In her early years, she attended Hellerup Kommuneskole and was a student at Emilie Valbom's ballet school. She studied under Emma Gad, who gave her the stage name, Karina Bell.

Bell made her debut in 1919 in the title role of "Tornerose" at Det Ny Teater. That same year, she began working on Carl Theodor Dreyer's film Leaves from Satan's Book, which premiered in 1921. She then acted in a large number of A. W. Sandberg's films, including David Copperfield (1922), Little Dorrit (1924), The Clown (1926), The Last Night (1928), and 5 raske piger (1933). She played in other theatrical productions during her career including Frøken Kirkemus at Betty Nansen Teatret.

On 26 May 1934 she married Knud Parkov (1894–1949), the director of Wiibroes Bryggeri in Helsingør. She retired from acting after their marriage. After his death on 20 January 1949, she took up a position on the board of Wiibroes Brewery, eventually becoming its director as her husband had been. She died on 5 June 1979 in Helsingør and is buried beside her husband at Ordrup Cemetery.

== Filmography ==
- En Ung Mands Väg (1919), directed by Carl Barcklind
- Helgeninderne (1921), directed by Benjamin Christensen
- Leaves from Satan's Book (1921)
- David Copperfield (1922)
- Paa Slaget 12 (1923), directed by A.W. Sandberg
- Den sidste Dans (1923), directed by A.W. Sandberg
- Kan Kvinder fejle? (1924), directed by A.W. Sandberg
- Kærlighedes-Øen (1924), directed by A.W. Sandberg
- Little Dorrit (1924)
- Wienerbarnet (1924), directed by A.W. Sandberg
- Min Ven privatdetektiven (1924), directed by A.W. Sandberg
- Morænen (1924), directed by A.W. Sandberg
- Fra Piazza del Popolo (1925; English: Mists of the Past), directed by A.W. Sandberg
- Maharajahens Yndlingshustru (1926), directed by A.W. Sandberg
- The Clown (1926)
- Revolutionsbryllup (1927), directed by A.W. Sandberg
- The Last Night (1928)
- Slangen (1928), directed by A.W. Sandberg
- Phantoms of Happiness (1929)
- 5 raske piger (1933)
- Nyhavn 17 (1933), directed by George Schnéevoigt
