= Per Gravdal =

Norwegian Christian leader (1842–1909)

Per Gravdal, later Peder Olsen Nodland (1842–1909) was a Norwegian pastor and founder of the Christian denomination Det Almindelige Samfund ('The Catholic Community', catholic here in the sense of 'universal'), one of the churches that came from the Strong Believer (Sterktroende) movement in opposition to the Haugeans. Gravdal served as its pastor for eight years from 1901 to 1909.

Gravdal was born in Bjerkreim Municipality and was a farmer. What he lacked in education, he made up for through his charismatic preaching. He became the pastor of The Community (Samfundet), where he took over the role after the death of founder Bernt Lomeland in 1900. When the churches split regarding the issue of to what extent Gravdal had the "same spirit", he and his followers, known as Perane, were forced out of the church. He and 233 others then founded Det Almindelige Samfund, while the Lomelenders continued in The Community.

Gravdal moved to the city after having been chosen as pastor. His wife remained in Nodland. His maid, Kristina Skipstad, worked at the parsonage to look after him. She held a unique role in the church "as the only woman to have held anything resembling a leadership position in a Strong Believer church community." Until she died, it was common in the parish for newborns to be given names starting with the letters P or K, or a combination of the two.

In 1905, he published En Fremsættelse af Guds Naadens Orden udi Prædikener indeholdende en Forklaring om Synd og Naade, Fald og Opreisning ('An Exposition of the Order of God's Grace through Sermons Containing an Explanation of Sin and Grace, Fall and Redemption').
