= Knud Spødervold =

Norwegian lay preacher (1791–1848)

- Born: 24 July 1791; Bjerkreim, Norway
- Died: 20 March 1848 (aged 56); Stavanger, Norway
- Occupations: Lay preacher, leader of the Strong Believers
- Notable work: Guds nådes husholdning ('The Dispensation of God's Grace')
- Spouse: Joren Larsdatter Kvitlen (m. 1826)

Knud Kittelsen Spødervold (24 July 1791 – 20 March 1848) was a Norwegian author and lay preacher and leader of the Strong Believers (Sterktroende), a theologically conservative Norwegian Christian movement in opposition to the Haugean movement, with roots in the Lutheran Church of Norway.

== Upbringing ==
Knud Spødervold was born in on the Spødervold farm in the parish of Bjerkreim, Rogaland, Norway, to farmer Kittel Gulliksen and Marthe Rasmusdatter Osland. He grew up on the Spødervold farm in Bjerkreim. During his childhood he received his education at the ambulatory school of the time. He was confirmed by provost Gerhard Henrich Reiner in 1807. When he herded sheep in his youth, he carried the Bible and the Augsburg Confession in his backpack. He has been described as an autodidact. In his youth, Knud is said to have been a teacher in Sirdal for some time. In 1813 his father's farm was divided between Spødervold and his brother Michel.

In 1811, Spødervold was 20 years old and became a soldier in the Vesterlenske Infantry Regiment; due to the tense relations with Sweden, he was first ordered to Larvik. During his military service in 1813, Spødervold met priest Wilhelm Andreas Falck who lived on Nøtterøy.

== Work as a farmer ==
After his military service, Spødervold returned to his homeland and found work on the farm of the priest Knud Wessel Brown in Jæren. In 1821 he bought his brother Michel's share of their father's farm, and five years later – on 8 November 1826 – he married Joren Larsdatter Kvitlen (1806–1886). They had eight children, but only five survived to adulthood. From 1825, he worked as a teacher and bell-ringer in Sirdal for a time. In 1836 Spødervold and his family moved to the farm Efteland, and in 1842 they moved to Stavanger. He first leased land in Egenes, but later moved to the city and lived in great poverty. He is said to have received financial help from Haugean lay preacher John Haugvaldstad.

== Lay preaching ==
In his time, Spødervold was known for "his incomparable knowledge of the Bible", and writer Arne Garborg refers to him in Fred ('Peace') as "a farmer in Western Norway who belonged to the Strong Believers and wrote books in defense of this sect". He was also referred to by writer Henrik Wergeland in the 1832 Folkebladet, a political and economic journal, as a prophet. Spødervold easily connected with people, and household devotions were common under his leadership.

In 1828, together with Anbjørn Asbjørnsen Varp, he held several meetings in Egersund, which were well attended. Together with Villads Tollefsen Bjerkreim he continued the gatherings in 1829. These meetings were reported and a complaint was sent to provost Jørgen Theodor Meldal by parish priest Andreas Peter Marquard Hartvig. Meldal forwarded the complaint to the bishop of Kristiansand, Johan Storm Munch, who believed it was "necessary by serious means to inhibit the nuisance of the so-called readers of Bjerkreim parish going around to the villages and holding public religious lectures and speeches to the confusion of the like-minded". Spødervold and his followers were summoned to see provost Meldal and in 1829 were banned by him from speaking.

Three years later, in 1832, he and some friends, Villads Tollefsen Bjerkreim, and Torger Andersen Fotland, were again reported to the Ministry of Churches and Education by Hartvig in Egersund for violation of the Conventicle Act. The act, in effect until 1842, prohibited lay preachers from holding private religious services (conventicles). Stavanger County then ordered fogd (bailiff) Søren Daniel Schiøtz to conduct an interrogation. But Schiøtz – because of his own religious views – had no reason to prosecute them. Schiøtz personally interrogated the defendants in June 1832 and sent the case back to the Ministry of Churches. Thereafter, nothing more was heard of the case, and Spødervold and his followers escaped further action.

In 1840, he had followers in a number of areas: Bjerkreim, Sirdal, Åseral, Høgsfjord, Stavanger, Egersund, and Helleland. The movement would later split into several branches.

== The Dispensation of God's Grace ==
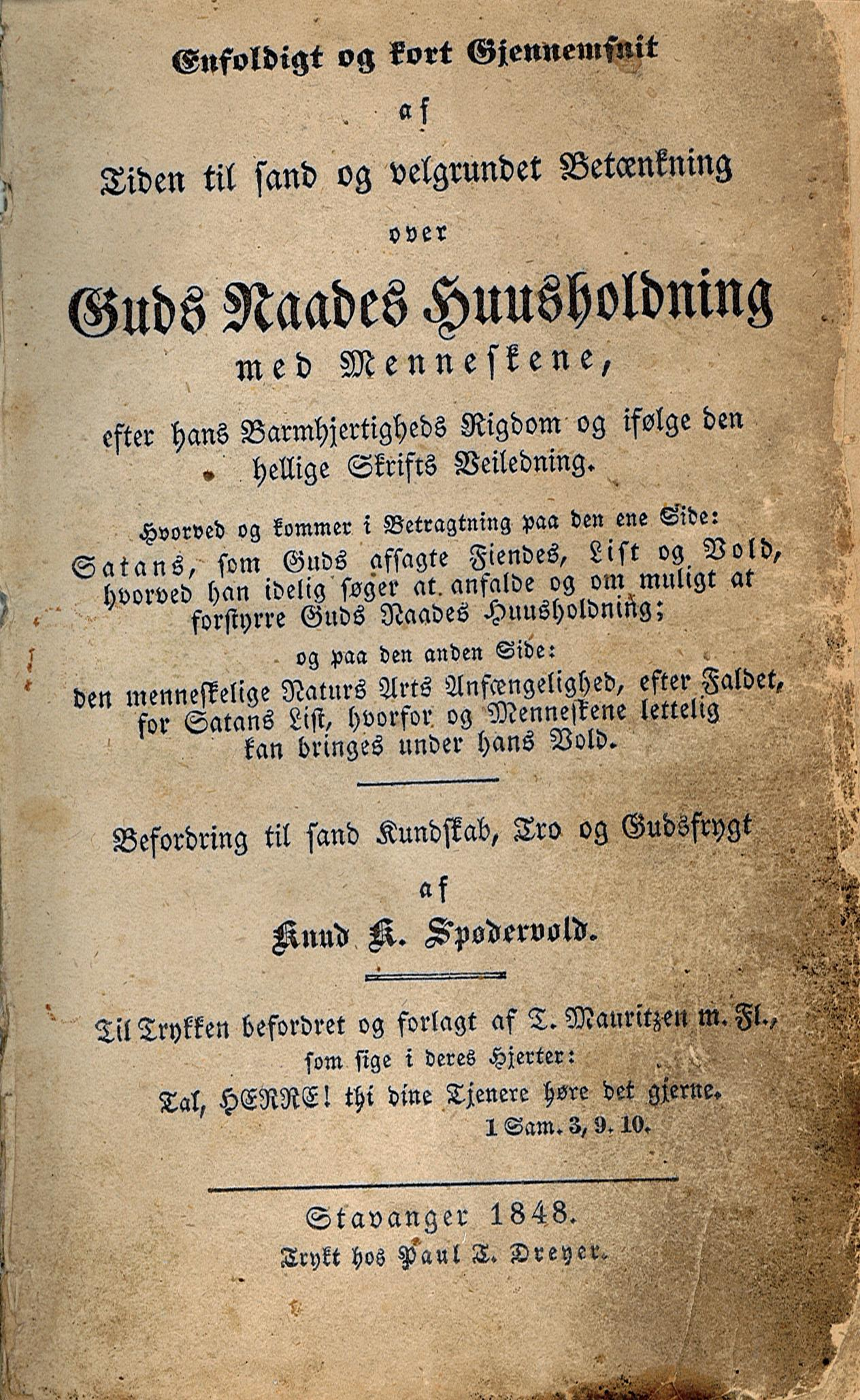
First edition of Guds nådes husholdning (The Dispensation of God's Grace), published in 1848

In his later years, Spødervold lived in Stavanger, where he settled in 1842, and it was here that he finished the book Guds nådes husholdning ('The Dispensation of God's Grace'), popularly known as Knudabogjæ in the local dialect. With its original 90-word title, it consisted of 360 pages of dense, wordy polemic against Haugeans, the Moravian Church, Quakers, and others. In the book, he takes the reader through the history of the Bible from the creation of the world through Moses and David and the prophets. He shows that there is a struggle between good and evil, between God and the devil. The only remedy against deception is knowledge – a right knowledge of God and his will. Through examples from history, he shows God's punishment when people do not want right knowledge and Christian enlightenment.

In the last four chapters, Spødervold shows himself to be a critic of contemporary spiritual movements. He first attacks Wilhelm Andreas Wexels, who allowed for the possibility of conversion after death. Spødervold disagrees entirely and argues that judgment comes after death.

Throughout his adult life, Spødervold had lived alongside the Pietistic Haugean revival and had also been in contact with Hans Nielsen Hauge. However, he had very little sympathy for Hauge and his views, since his teachings and writings were permeated by the system of works. Spødervold believed that Hauge drove people "from vices to virtues" in order to win God's favor and grace. He rebuked the Haugeans for what he perceived as a legalistic, excessive focus on works righteousness. He also criticizes Hauge for his doctrine of the Eucharist, since Hauge denied that Christ's human nature was in the sacrament, i.e. he did not support the Lutheran view of real presence. Hauge emphasized rather the spiritual benefit of the Eucharist. With this starting point, Spødervold characterizes Hauge as a Calvinist.

In another chapter he rebukes the Moravian Church, which had taken root in Stavanger. He attacks their lack of enlightenment on the triune God; nor did they have the right knowledge about the word of God, the Law, and the Gospel. In Spødervold's opinion, they could not explain how a person was born again and justified. Spødervold's focus, conversely, was on justification through faith alone (sola fide).

In the last chapter, Spødervold takes a stand against the Quakers. They mixed the effect of the law and the gospel, and they had a wrong concept of the Spirit of God. They did not regard the Bible as the word of God, and they rejected baptism and communion. Spødervold shows that the Holy Spirit does not work apart from his word, which is his medium of communication with mankind. God is in the literal word, and it expresses his will.

== Death ==
Spødervold died in Stavanger in 1848.

== Critique of Spødervold ==
Anton Christian Bang writes in his biography of Hauge that "Knud Spødervold does not seem to have undergone any deeper penetration into the secrets of Christian life. On the other hand, a diligent reading of Luther's writings has given him a fairly clear theoretical insight into the doctrine of the justification of faith."

Bang also writes that there was a split in Stavanger around 1850. The background is said to have been that some held firmly to Spødervold's doctrine of baptism and rebirth, while others rejected it as heresy. In the appendix to The Dispensation of God's Grace, Spødervold wrote that in baptism one is not reborn to resemble the image of God. On the contrary, one is in Satan's kingdom from baptism to faith, "although God preserves his established foundation".

== Contemporary accounts ==
A memory of Spødervold is preserved in a discussion he had with the provost Hans Lund, who met him one day late in the fall after everyone else had long since brought their grain in. "The weather is good now", said Lund, "now you must see to it that you bring in the grain". Spødervold was immediately ready with his answer: "In the fullness of time God sent his son, and in the fullness of time I too will bring in my grain."

Priest Alexander Lange, grandfather of writer Alexander Kielland, came to Stavanger as chaplain in 1818 and left as provost in 1839. In his memoirs, he recounts his meeting with Spødervold:

Knud Spjødevold [sic] from Birkreim parish also paid me a visit. He was a horrible man. His countenance and whole manner were so rough, wild, and almost beastly, that one could consider him capable of anything. He pretended to want to ask me for information concerning passages in the Old Testament, but all his questions were based on obscenities, so I seriously rebuked him and let him know that if he did not seek any other information, I would have nothing to do with him. He went away, and I never saw him again.

== See also ==
- Bernt B. Lomeland – later leader of a branch of Strong Believers
- The Community (Samfundet) – branch of the Strong Believers
