= Strong Believers =

Norwegian Christian movement

The Strong Believers (Norwegian: Sterktroende) is a theologically conservative Norwegian Christian movement, with roots in the Lutheran Church of Norway, in opposition to the Haugean movement. They split from the Church of Norway in 1890.

== Founding and beliefs ==
The Strong Believers started in Rogaland, Norway, in the mid-1800s and were led by lay preacher Knud Spødervold (1791–1848), the son of a farmer from Bjerkreim Municipality. In 1848 he published a book called Guds nådes husholdning ('The Dispensation of God's Grace'), in which he outlined his views and his interpretation of the Bible. Spødervold criticized Pietist revival preacher Hans Nielsen Hauge for being too concerned with the importance of works. Spødervold emphasized faith and justification instead of repentance and sanctification. He claimed that "it is impossible for a child of God to fall out of their state of grace".

Strong Believers have been described as strict, as well as exclusionary towards outsiders. They do not participate in any ecumenical Christian gatherings. Strong Believers adhere to older church customs and hymns, such as Danish hymnwriter Thomas Kingo's 1699 hymnal. Unlike other Christian groups in the area, they have historically had a lenient approach towards alcohol, with founders known to drink alcohol while preaching.

== Branches ==
The movement initially consisted of four branches, one of which – Det gammel Lutherske-Samfund ('The Old Lutheran Community') – later returned to the state church in 1958 after splitting off in 1925.

The movement still exists in Kristiansand and in the Egersund area under the official name Samfundet (The Community) in three branches. One branch is called The Community (Samfundet), or Lomelenders, after its leader in the 1880s, Bernt B. Lomeland. Another branch is Det Almindelige Samfund ('The Catholic Community', catholic here in the sense of 'universal') or Perane after Per Gravdal, founded in 1901. The third group, Det Almindelige Lutherske Samfund ('The Catholic Lutheran Community', again in the sense of 'universal') or Larsane after founder Abraham Larsen, started in 1952 after a split from Det Almindelige Samfund.
