= Berg, Østfold =

Former municipality in Østfold, Norway

Coordinates: 59°10′0″N 11°9′0″E

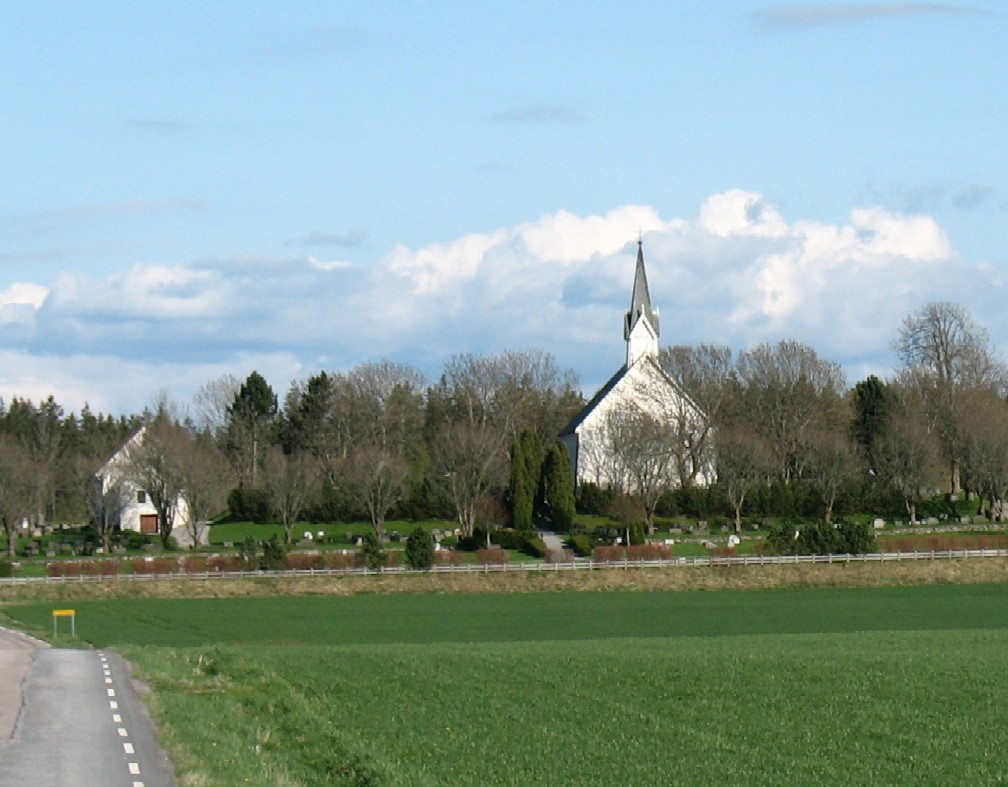
Berg in Halden

Berg is a former parish and municipality which now forms part of Halden municipality in Østfold county, Norway. The rural municipality was (together with Idd) was merged with the city of Halden on 1 January 1967.

== History ==
Berg was the main parish in a district which included Rokke and Halden until 1721. Halden subsequently became the main parish in the district. By a royal proclamation in 1769, Berg became the head of its own district with Rokke and Asak as annexes. The parish of Berg was established as a municipality on 1 January 1838 (see formannskapsdistrikt). The Østfold Line was built through Berg in 1879 and Berg Station was opened to serve it.

== The name ==
The municipality (originally the parish) was named after the farm Berg (Old Norse Berg), since the first church was built on its ground. The name is identical with the word berg meaning 'rocky hill; mountain'.

== Berg Church ==
Berg stone church (Berg steinkirke) dates from ca. 1100. The edifice is in Romanesque style and built of brick with natural stone in the corners. The medieval era building has an oblong nave and a smaller square choir. The pulpit is from 1592. In the nave hangs a painting of the Crucifixion and a copy of an epitaph on a plaque from 1601. The original is located at the Norwegian Museum of Cultural History. To the right of the choir hangs a tablet with figures of the twelve apostles dating from the 1600s. After a new church was built on the site in 1878, the old medieval church was partially demolished in 1882. The church was rebuilt in 1970.

== Gallery ==
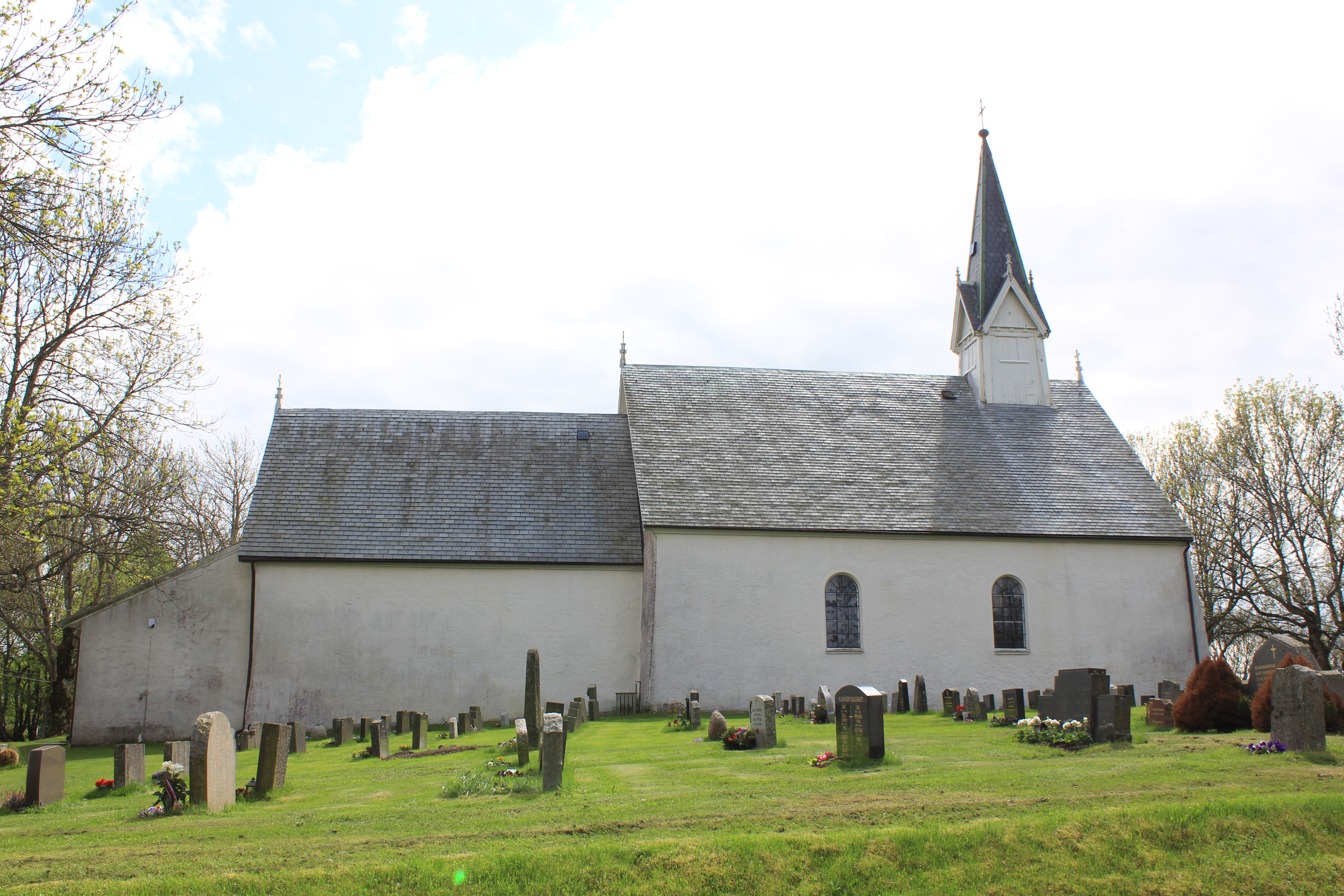
Berg steinkirke

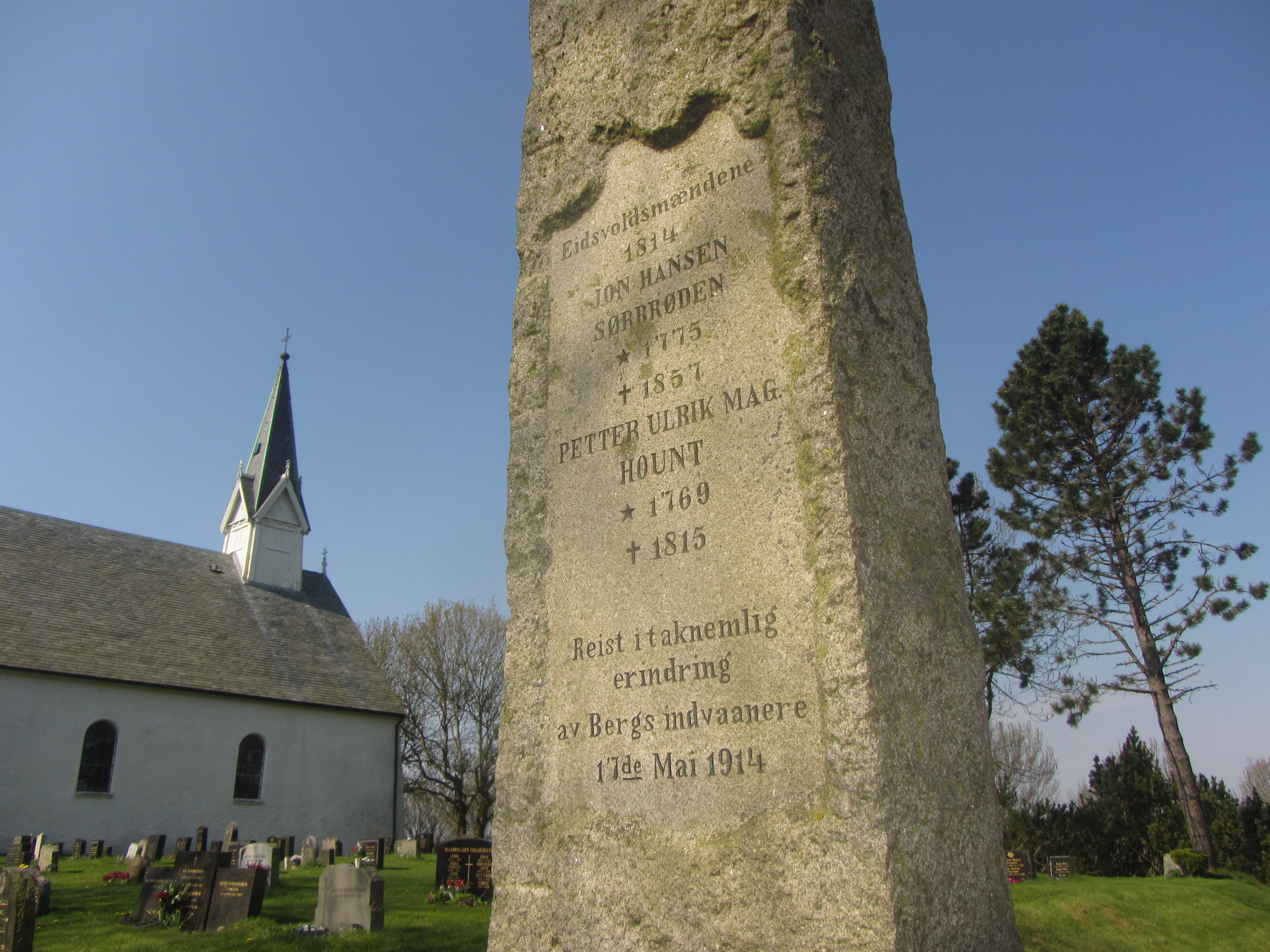
Monument to John Hansen Sørbrøden and Peter Ulrik Magnus Hount

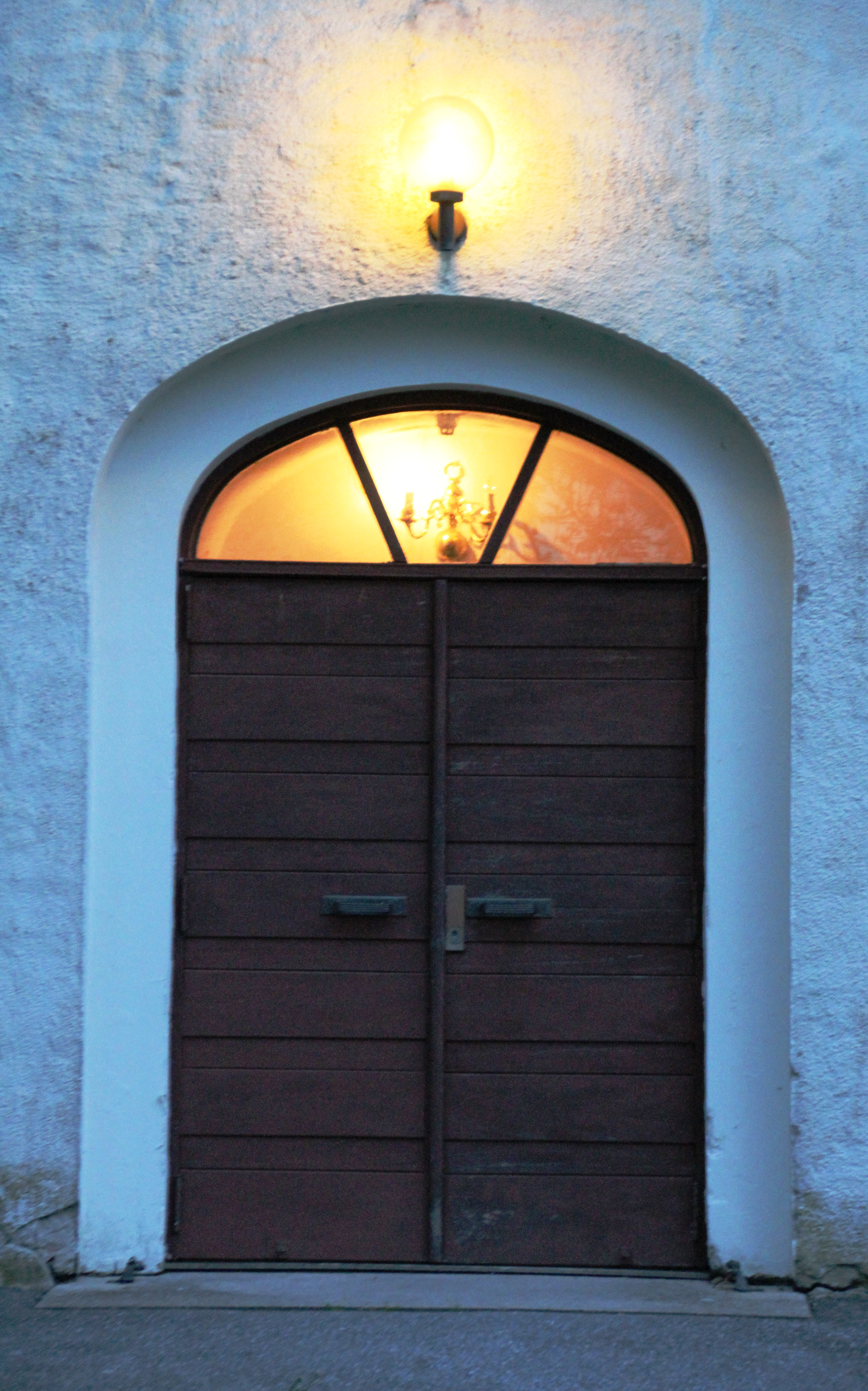
Arched doorway

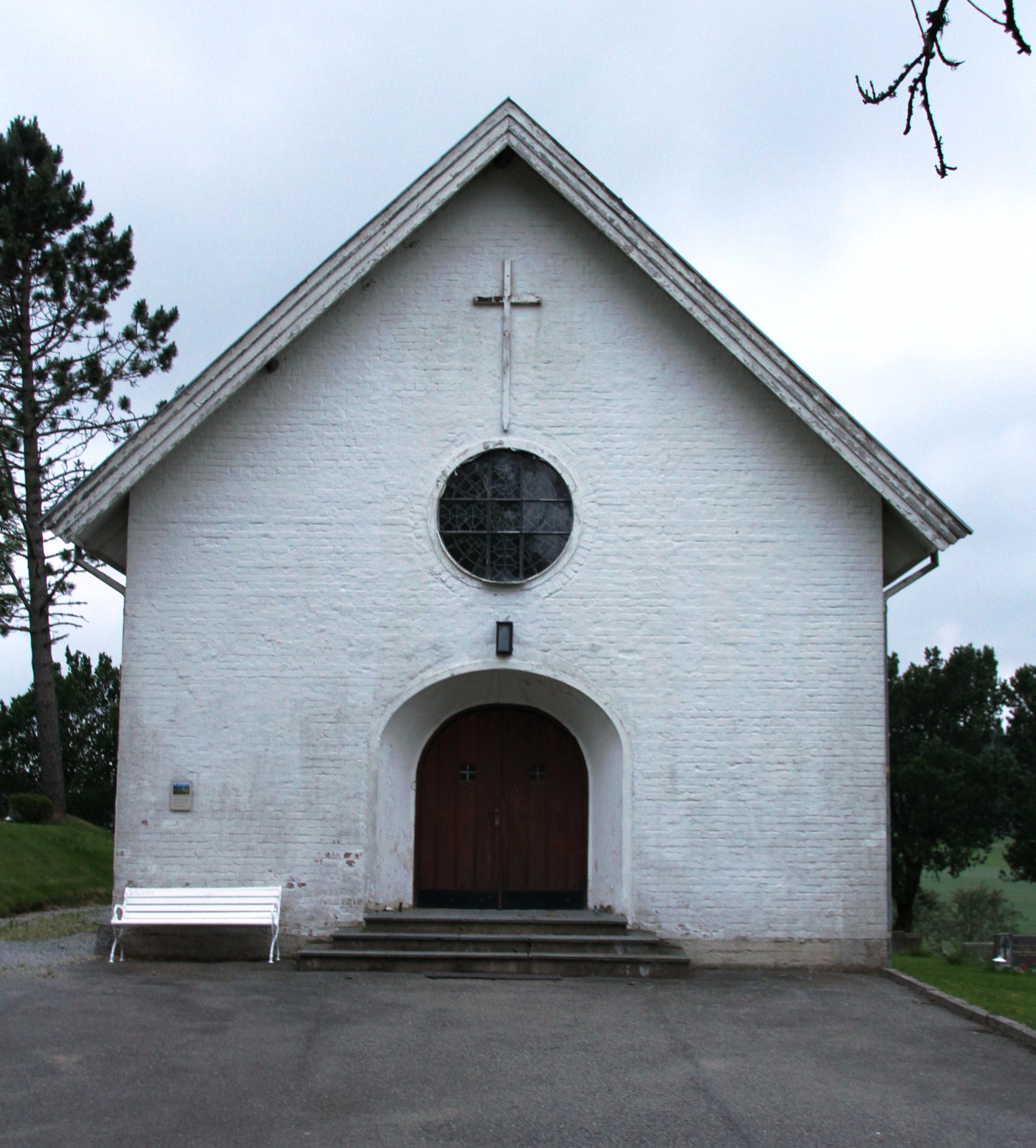
Chapel

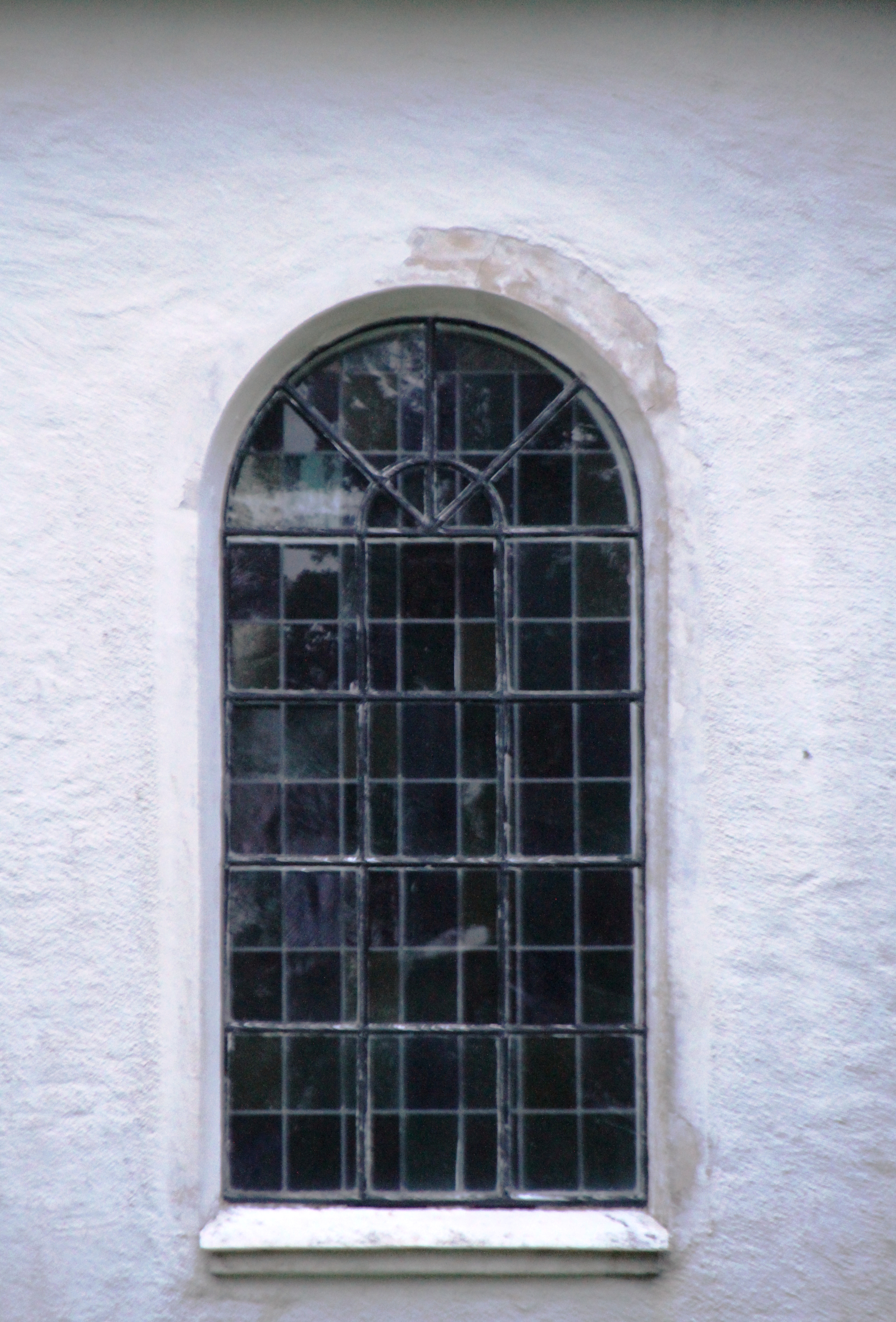
Side window
