= Berg station =

Berg station may refer to:

- Berg metro station, a station on the Sognsvann Line (line 6) of the Oslo Metro in Norway
- Berg railway station, a closed railway station on the Østfold Line located at Berg in Halden, Norway.
