= Heinrich Christian Friedrich Hosenfelder =

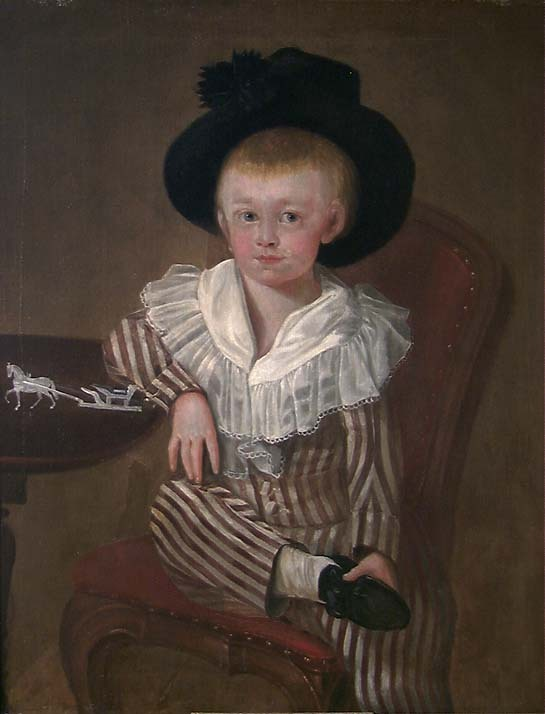
James Collett (1791–92).

Heinrich Christian Friedrich Hosenfelder (c. 1720 – 27 October 1805) was a German born, Norwegian painter.

== Biography ==
He was born in Berlin between 1719 and 1722. His parents are not known, but his lineage does include painters such as Christian Friedrich Hosenfelder (1706–1880) who lives in Berlin and St. Petersburg where he was a professor at the Art Academy.

He emigrated to Norway around 1760 to work as a painter for a faience factory in Idd near Halden. The factory went defunct, whereupon he traveled to Halden where he received burghership as a painter. After a period as a roccoco decorator, he made a name as a portrait artist. The bulk of his work occurred during the 1780s. It was mostly people with the area of Halden who he painted. Portraits owned by the National Gallery of Norway include those of Johan P. Vosgraff (1780s), Anna H. Vosgraff (1780s) and James Collett (1791–92).

== Personal life ==
He married Inger Olsdatter Lundgreen in 1767; when she died around 1774 he married again. He sold his house in Halden during 1790. He died during 1805 in Tune (now Sarpsborg) in Østfold.
