= Sara Oust =

Norwegian lay minister (1778–1822)

Sara Oust (15 March 1778 – 25 October 1822) was a Norwegian lay minister and follower of Hans Nielsen Hauge. She has been described as the country's first female Christian minister and was a leader within the Haugean movement.

== Biography ==
Sara Oust was born at the village of Vingelen in the parish of Tolga in Hedmark county, Norway. She was the daughter of farmer Engebret Engebretsen Vingelen and Mari Persdatter Røe. Being fatherless at the age of seven, Oust helped her mother carry coal at the Røros Copper Works (Røros kopparverk). Interested in faith from a young age, she read Erik Pontoppidan's works.

She first became aware of the teachings of Hans Nielsen Hauge in 1799 after having met members of the movement working at the copper works. She became active in the movement herself, subsequently preaching in Trøndelag between 1799 and 1805 alongside another female lay minister, Randi Hevle from Drivdalen in Sør-Trøndelag, and later Kirsten Fossen from the parish of Kvikne. Women were initially accepted as ministers in the movement due to Hauge's views on equality. She first met Hauge in Oppdal in 1803.

Oust reportedly had a beautiful singing voice and preached through singing; she also wrote hymns.

Under the Conventicle Act of 1741, Norwegian citizens at the time did not have the right to religious assembly without a Church of Norway minister present. She successfully defended a collective of Haugeans from the local authorities, who gave up their attempts to implement the law after having seen she had too much support from the community.

In 1805, Oust married Ola Toresen Utistuhaugen (Røe), who was a farmer in Vingelen. They had three children, but their firstborn died in infancy. Oust died 25 October 1822, likely during childbirth.

Following the death of Hauge in 1824, the Haugean movement became less supportive of lay ministers. It also grew more conservative and, after the first generation of Haugeans, no longer allowed female ministers.

A play about her life, entitled Noen må gå foran. Spelet om Sara Oust ('Someone has to lead the way. A play about Sara Oust') premiered in 2011. The performance took place in the yard of the Ousta farm where she grew up. The scriptwriter and director was Rolf Norsen; others included composer Tone Hulbækmo, and actress Ingunn Løvold. Singers Kjersti Tingelstad, Rønnaug Tingelstad, Lars Tingelstad and Andreas Moen performed the play.

== Primary source ==
- Bakken, Arne O. (1973). Haugianerne i Nord-Østerdal de første årene lederen Sara Oust 1778–1822 (in Norwegian). Oslo: Tolga bibliotek.

== Related reading ==
- Aarflot, Andreas (1979). Hans Nielsen Hauge, his life and message. Minneapolis: Augsburg Publishing. ISBN 978-0-8066-1627-8.
- Pettersen, Wilhelm (2008). The Light In The Prison Window: The Life Story of Hans Nielsen Hauge. Kessinger Publishing. ISBN 978-1-4366-7790-5.
- Shaw, Joseph M. (1979). Pulpit Under the Sky: A Life of Hans Nielsen Hauge. Greenwood Press Reprint. ISBN 978-0-313-21123-2.
