= Peter Ulrik Magnus Hount =

Norwegian priest (1769–1815)

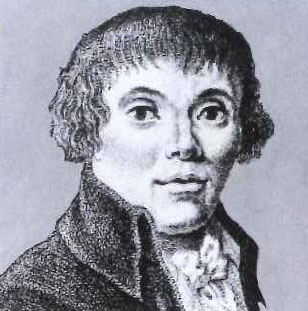
- Born: 1769; Sønderborg, Denmark
- Died: 17 July 1815 (aged 45–46); Norway
- Occupation: Priest
- Known for: Representative at the Norwegian Constitutional Assembly 1814

Peter Ulrik Magnus Hount (1769 – 17 July 1815) was a Norwegian priest and representative at the Norwegian Constitutional Assembly.

Peter Ulrik Magnus Hount was born at Nørre Sønderborg on the island of Als in the Region of Southern Denmark. In his youth, his family moved to the parish of Søgne in Lister og Mandal, Norway. Peter attended Kristiansand Cathedral School. He began his studies at the University of Copenhagen in 1786. He became in 1793 assistant pastor at Voss Church in Søndre Bergenhus. In 1800 he became vicar of Moss in Østfold, and later became provost at Nedre Borgesyssel deanery (Nedre Borgesyssel prosti) in the Diocese of Borg.

Together with John Hansen Sørbrøden, he represented Smaalenenes amt (now Østfold) at the Norwegian Constituent Assembly at Eidsvoll Manor. In 1814 where they both voted with the independence party (Selvstendighetspartiet). He was a member of the Parliament of Norway for the period 1815–1816. He was decorated Knight of the Swedish Order of the Polar Star in 1815.
