= Bull Museum =

- Bull-museet
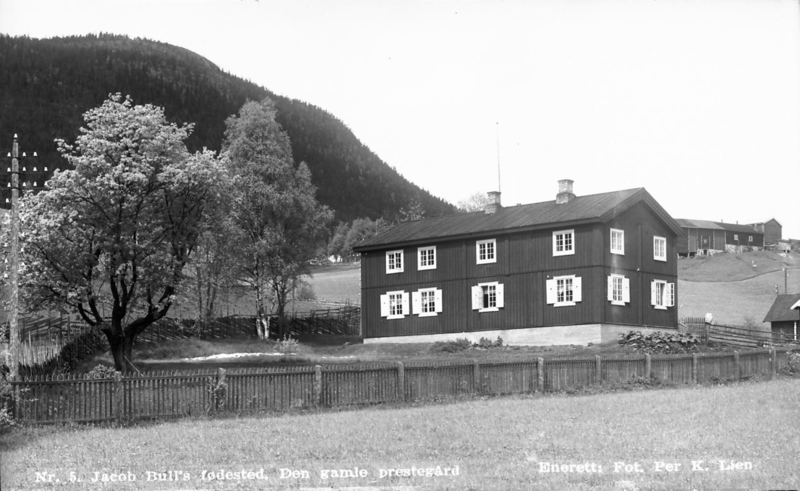
- Parsonage farm at Øvre Rendal

- Location within Innlandet Location within Norway
- Location: Bergset, Norway
- Coordinates: 61°53′5″N 11°4′51″E
- Type: Open-air museum
- Website: museainordosterdalen.no/rendalen-bygdemuseum-bullmuseet

The Bull Museum (Norwegian: Bull-museet), also known as the Rendalen Village Museum (Norwegian: Rendalen Bygdemuseum), is located at Rendalen's old parish farm dating from 1747 in Bergset, Norway. This was the birthplace and childhood home of the author Jacob Breda Bull (1853–1930). The collection includes the cradle he lay in as a child and furniture from his workroom in Copenhagen.

The yard around the vicarage includes, among other things, the grave of the horse Vesleblakken from Bull's short story. The yard is maintained by Rendalen Hagelag. The museum is a venue for various cultural events. Every summer, the play Morosamme kropper og arme kroker based on Bull's works is performed at the museum grounds.

The museum also includes the old Berger school 100 meters (330 ft) south of the parsonage. Here there are a school museum, a bank museum, and a large musical collection connected with the musician Ottar E. Akre.
