= Renewers of the Church =

Renewers of the Church is a title given to some individuals by the Lutheran Book of Worship, a work created by several of the large North American Lutheran denominations in 1978.

It is given only to those individuals who have through their lives and actions significantly contributed to the development and vitality of the Christian church. The individuals specifically designated by one or more Lutheran churches with this term include:

- Johann Konrad Wilhelm Loehe, commemorated on January 2
- Antony of Egypt, and Pachomius, commemorated on January 17
- Martin Luther, commemorated on February 18
- John Wesley, and Charles Wesley, commemorated on March 2
- Hans Nielsen Hauge, commemorated on March 29
- Olavus Petri, and Laurentius Petri, commemorated on April 19
- Julian of Norwich, commemorated on May 8
- Nicolaus Ludwig von Zinzendorf, commemorated on May 9
- John Calvin, commemorated on May 27
- Columba, Aidan, and Bede, commemorated on June 9
- Philipp Melanchthon, commemorated on June 25
- Birgitta of Sweden, commemorated on July 23
- N. F. S. Grundtvig, commemorated on September 2
- Francis of Assisi, commemorated on October 4
- Teresa of Avila, commemorated on October 15
- John of the Cross, commemorated on December 14
- Katharina von Bora Luther, commemorated on December 20
