= Haugean movement =

Christian Pietistic movement in Norway

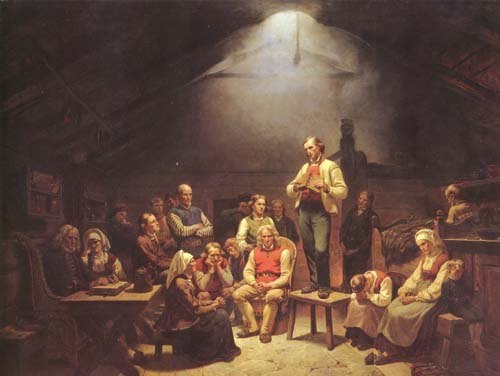
Haugianere Adolph Tidemand (1852)

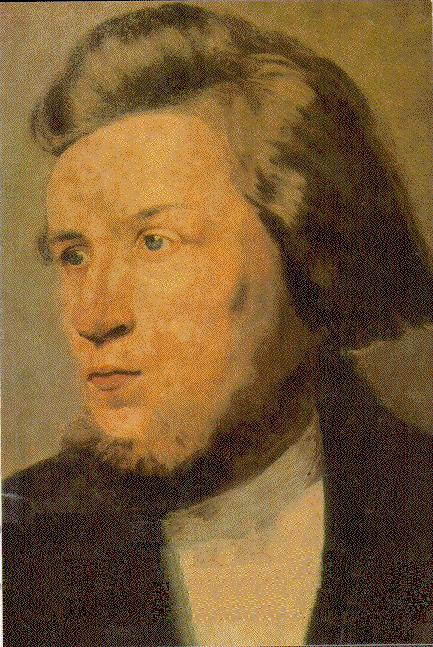
Hans Nielsen Hauge ca. 1800

The Haugean movement or Haugeanism (Norwegian: haugianere/haugianarar) was a Pietistic state church reform movement intended to bring new life and vitality into the Church of Norway, which had been often characterized by formalism and lethargy. The movement emphasized personal diligence, enterprise and frugality.

== Background ==
The Haugean movement took its name from the lay evangelist Hans Nielsen Hauge (1771–1824).

Over a period of 18 years, Hauge published 33 books. Hauge traveled, mostly by foot, throughout much of Norway. Hauge was arrested several times and faced state persecution. He was imprisoned no less than fourteen times between 1794 and 1811, spending a total of nine years in prison. Upon his release from prison in 1811, he took up work as a farmer and industrialist at Bakkehaugen near Christiania (now Oslo). He later bought the Bredtvet farm (now the current site of Bredtvet Church in Oslo) where he lived out his life.

In the movement's early days, Hauge's emphasis on equality between men and women was a key aspect; women such as Sara Oust served as lay preachers.

== Impact ==
Number of Haugean-minded members of the Parlament (1814-1910)

The teachings of Hauge had considerable influence with Norway. Within commerce, many Haugeans launched industry initiatives, including mills, shipyards, paper mills, textile industry and printing house. Within political activities, three Haugeans – John Hansen Sørbrøden, Christopher Borgersen Hoen and Ole Rasmussen Apeness – were in attendance at the National Assembly at Eidsvoll in 1814.

Within popular culture, the character Solveig in Peer Gynt (1876) by Henrik Ibsen is presented as a member of a Haugean family, and this religious affiliation is clearly related to her purity and steadfast love for the play's protagonist. Bjørnstjerne Bjørnson's work Synnøve Solbakken (1857) also presents the heroine as a Haugean with similar purity and commitment to her eventual betrothed, Thorbjørn. A vivid picture of Haugeans appears in the novels of Alexander Kielland. Adolph Tidemand portrayed Hauge and his followers in the painting Haugianerne (1852).

In September 1817 de Zee Ploeg, a ship with 500 immigrants from Württemberg, Germany, including a number of Rappites (followers of Pietist separatist George Rapp), was forced to stop in Norway because of poor weather conditions. Staying in Bergen for about a year and provided with housing by the authorities, they were warmly accepted by the Haugeans. The two groups found much in common and held devotions together, with some of the Germans learning Norwegian during their stay. Samson Trae, a Haugean leader, noted that "It gave us extreme joy to realize that the foundation of your faith accords with the true word of God." After Rapp's followers left to settle in the United States, the two groups remained in contact for at least some time. In one letter, the Rappites stated, "Our hearts have often longed for your loving and edifying company since we came to America. We have longed more for Bergen than for Germany because of the love with which you received us and re-freshed us in body and spirit."

The influence of Hans Nielsen Hauge within Norway coincided with the years during which many Norwegians were immigrating to North America. The Haugean influence on Lutheranism in America has been considerable. For example, the first Norwegian Lutheran minister in the United States was a Haugean. Lutherans in the U.S. had a Hauge Synod, Eielsen Synod, and Lutheran Free Church all indicative of that influence. He is honored and his writings are studied by American Laestadians, also called Apostolic Lutherans. (Most Laestadian denominations did not merge.) Hauge is remembered on the liturgical calendar of the Evangelical Lutheran Church in America on March 29 as one of the renewers of the church.

== Opposition ==
In opposition to the Haugean movement's perceived legalistic, excessive focus on works righteousness, the Strong Believers movement was formed. Its leader, lay preacher Knud Spødervold, published his book Guds nådes husholdning ('The Dispensation of God's Grace') in 1848. It was a polemic theological critique of the Haugeans, Moravian Church, Quakers, and others. This resulted in a "fierce bitterness" between the Haugeans and Spødervold.

== Language ==
The group's unique religiolect (shared religious language variety) has been studied. They were known for their use of biblical metaphors, while words such as desire and lukewarm took on new meanings among the Haugeans.

== See also ==
- Religion in Norway
- Läsare, a similar Pietistic movement in Sweden
- Nyevangelism, a movement that had some influence on Haugeanism

== Other sources ==
- Amundsen, Arne Bugge (1997) The Haugean Heritage – a Symbol of National History (from "In Search of Symbols. An Explorative Study" Jens Braarvig & Thomas Krogh, editors, pp. 214–233. Department of Cultural Studies, University of Oslo)
- Eielsen, Sigrid (2000) A Haugean Woman in America : the Autobiography of Sigrid Eielsen (Norwegian-American Historical Association. Northfield, Minn., vol. 35)
- Gjerde, S. S. & Ljostveit, P. (1941) The Hauge Movement In America (The Hauge Inner Mission Federation)
- Wee, Mons Olson (1919) Haugeanism: A Brief Sketch of the Movement and Some of Its Chief Exponents (Harvard University)

== Related reading ==
- Aarflot, Andreas (1979) Hans Nielsen Hauge, his life and message (Augsburg Publishing House, Minneapolis, MN.) ISBN 978-0-8066-1627-8
- Arnesen, Daniel (2001) Haugianske vennebrev (P. Øverland) ISBN 978-82-90936-33-9 (Norwegian)
- Bull, Jacob Breda (1912) Hans Nielsen Hauge (Kristania: Steen'ske Bogtrykkeri Og Forlag) ISBN 978-1-161-19331-2
- Pettersen, Wilhelm (2008) The Light In The Prison Window: The Life Story of Hans Nielsen Hauge (Kessinger Publishing, LLC) ISBN 978-1-4366-7790-5
- Hauge, Alfred (1947) Hans Nielsen Hauge: Guds vandringsmann (Ansgar) ISBN 978-82-503-0463-5 (Norwegian)
- Shaw, Joseph M. (1979) Pulpit Under the Sky: A Life of Hans Nielsen Hauge (Greenwood Press Reprint) ISBN 978-0-313-21123-2
- Sjursen, Finn Wiig (1993) Den haugianske periode, 1796–ca. 1850 (NLA-forlaget) ISBN 978-82-7468-020-3 (Norwegian)
- Thorvaldsen, Steinar (2010) A Prophet Behind the Plough, Hans Nielsen Hauge and his Ministry (University of Tromsø) ISBN 978-82-7389-210-2
