= Ytre Rendal Church =

Church in Innlandet, Norway

- Ytre Rendal kirke
- Otnes kirke
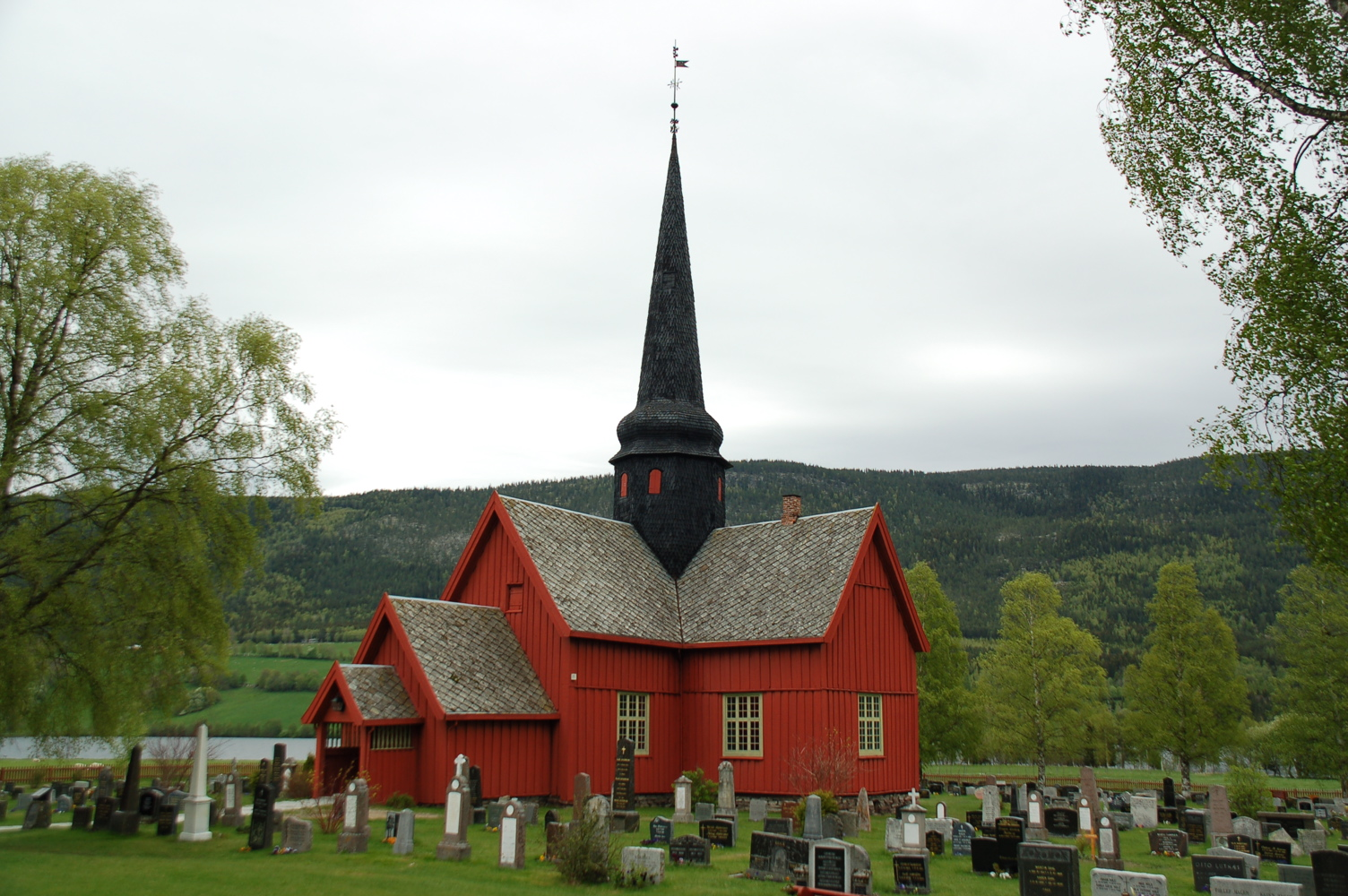
- View of the church
- Ytre Rendal Church
- 61°45′34″N 11°10′52″E
- Location: Rendalen Municipality, Innlandet
- Country: Norway
- Denomination: Church of Norway
- Previous denomination: Catholic Church
- Churchmanship: Evangelical Lutheran

History
- Status: Parish church
- Consecrated: 1751

Architecture
- Functional status: Active
- Architectural type: Cruciform
- Completed: 1751 (275 years ago)

Specifications
- Capacity: 180
- Materials: Wood

Administration
- Diocese: Hamar bispedømme
- Deanery: Nord-Østerdal prosti
- Parish: Ytre Rendal
- Norwegian Cultural Heritage Site
- Type: Church
- Status: Automatically protected
- ID: 85894

Ytre Rendal Church (Norwegian: Ytre Rendal kirke) is a parish church of the Church of Norway in Rendalen Municipality in Innlandet county, Norway. It is located in the village of Otnes. It is the church for the Ytre Rendal parish which is part of the Nord-Østerdal prosti (deanery) in the Diocese of Hamar. The red, wooden church was built in an cruciform design in 1751 using plans drawn up by an unknown architect. The church seats about 180 people.

Jacob Breda Bull is buried in the church graveyard.

== History ==
The earliest existing historical records of the church date back to the year 1444, but the church was not new that year. The first church in Rendalen was probably a wooden stave church that was located at Hornset, about 4.5 kilometres (2.8 mi) northeast of the present church site.

In 1670, the old church was torn down and a new replacement church was built about 4.5 kilometres (2.8 mi) to the south in the village of Otnes. This new church eventually fell into disrepair and around 1745, it was decided to build a new church. A new church was built about 70 metres (230 ft) south of the previous church in Otnes. It was a timber-framed cruciform church. Originally, the church exterior was unpainted. In 1857, the exterior was painted red. During a restoration in 1878, the church was painted white. In 1930, the church was painted red once again.

== Media gallery ==
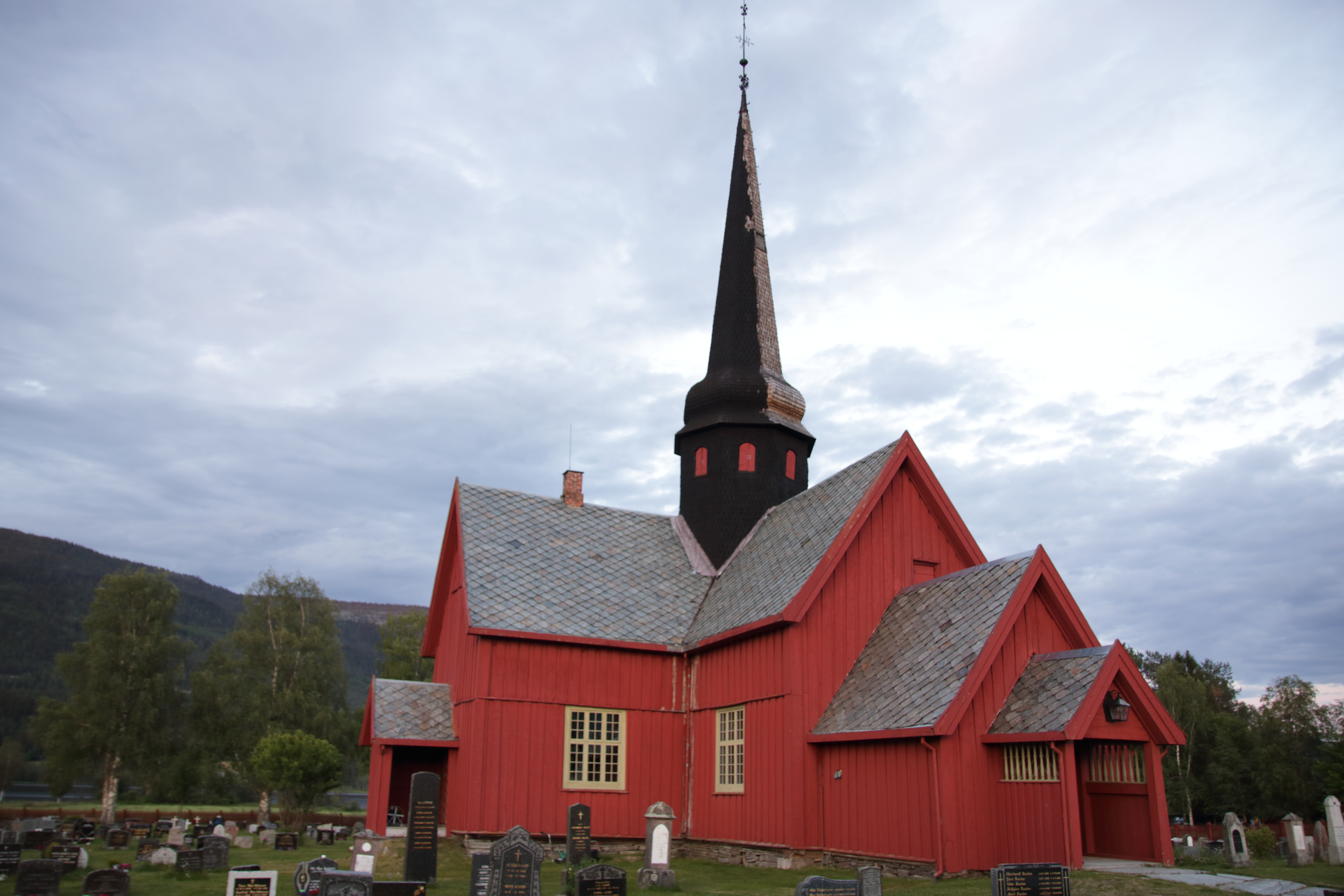

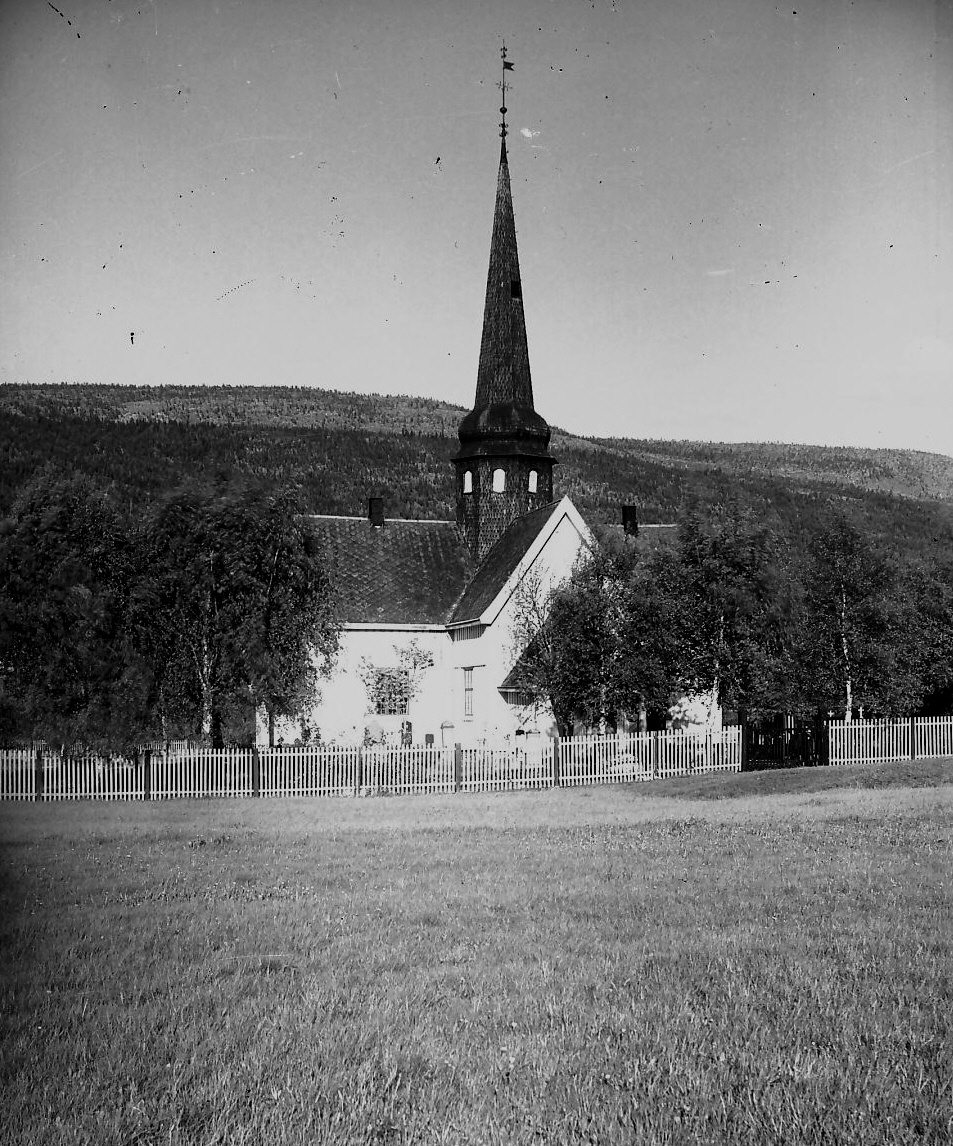

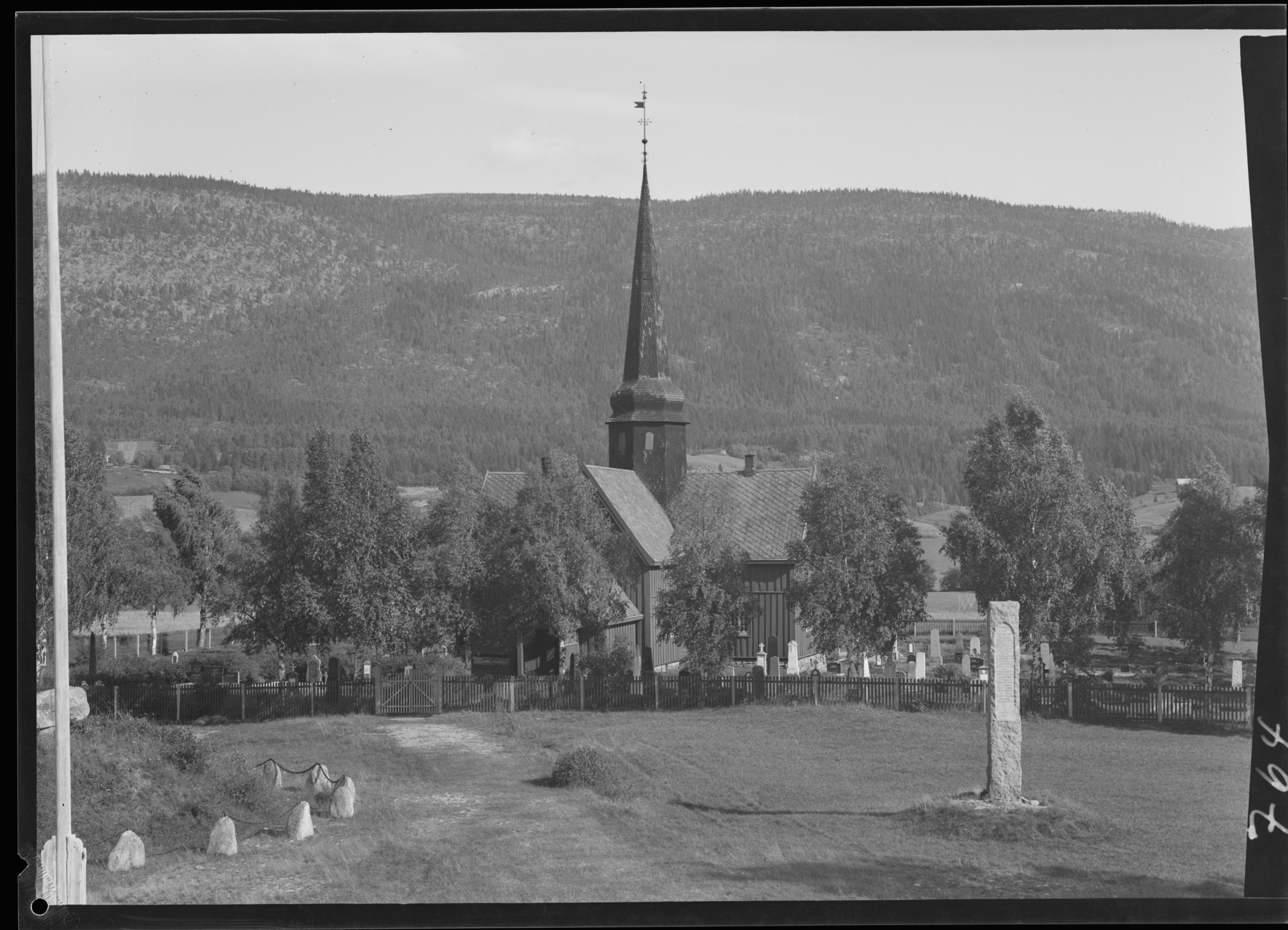

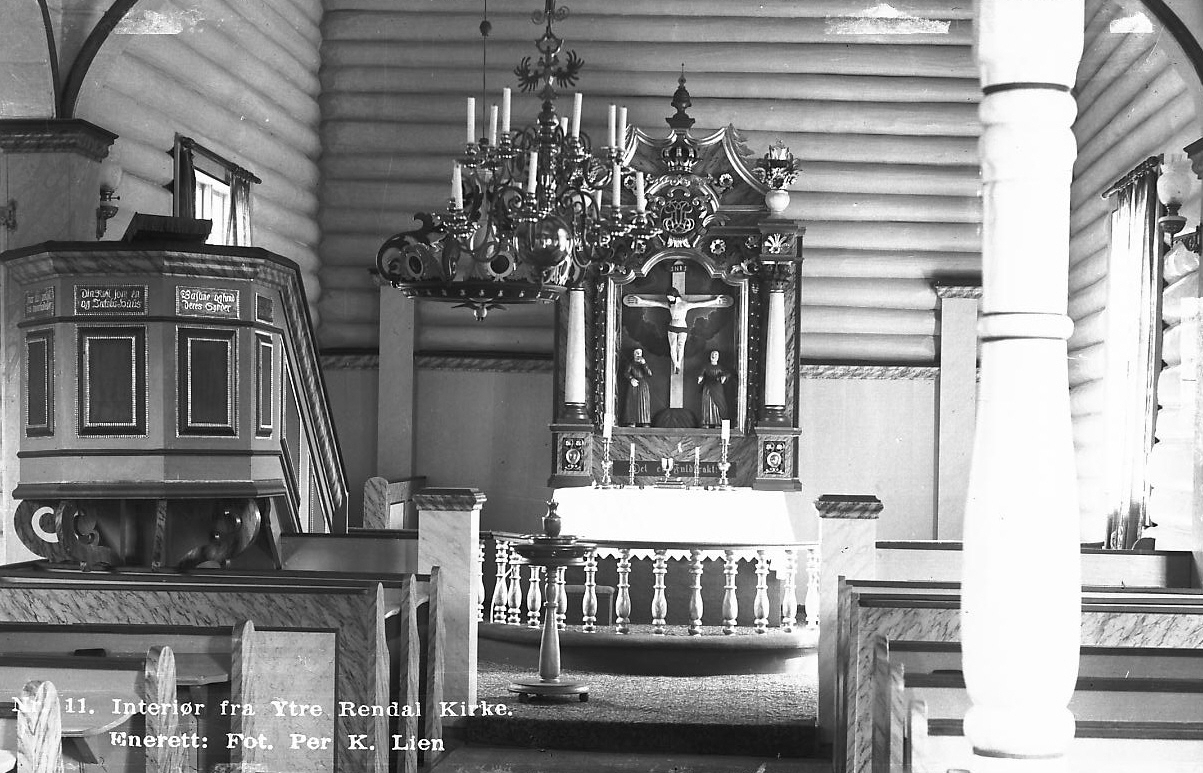

== See also ==
- List of churches in Hamar
