= Idd =

Parish in Østfold county, Norway

Coordinates: 59°05′11″N 11°26′05″E

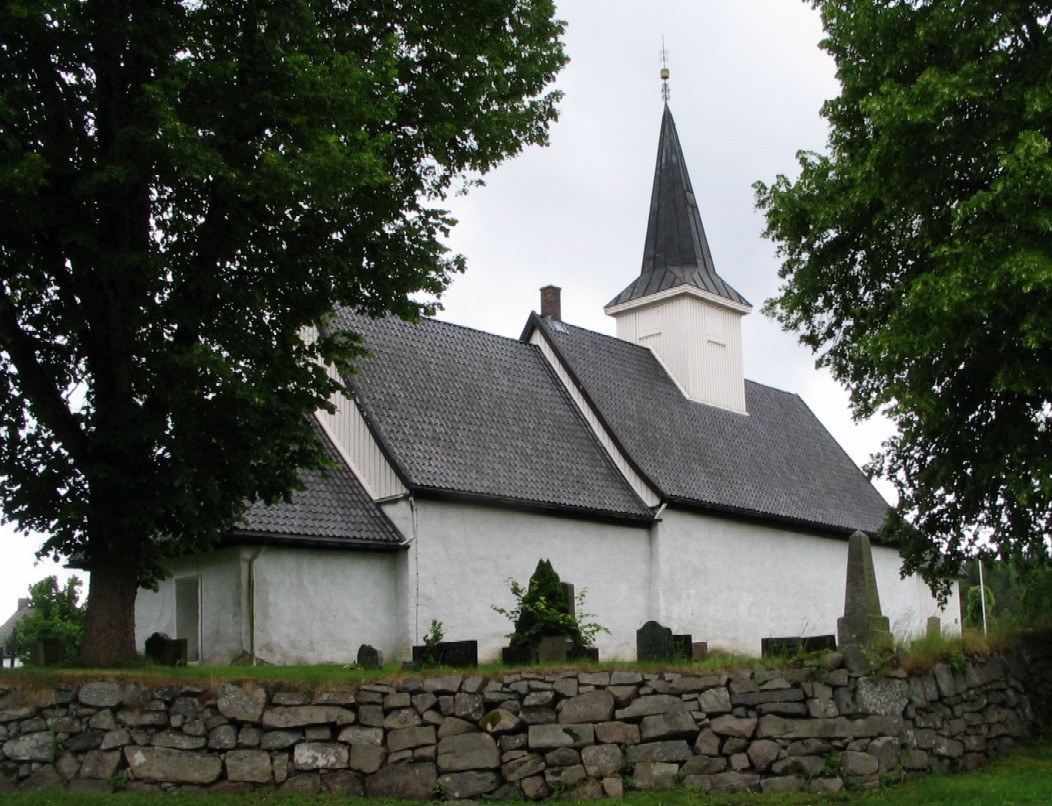
Idd Church

Idd is a parish and former municipality in Halden, Østfold county, Norway.

The parish of Id was established as a municipality January 1, 1838 (see formannskapsdistrikt). The rural municipality was (together with Berg) merged with the city of Halden January 1, 1967. Prior to the merger Idd had a population of 7,213. The municipality (originally the parish) is probably named after an old name of the vicarage. The meaning of the name is, however, unknown. Until 1918 the name was written Id.

Idd Church (Idd Kirke) dates from ca. 1100. It belongs Sarpsborg deanery and is located southeast of Halden. The edifice is of stone and has 190 seats. The church is built in the Romanesque style. The church has a medieval baptismal font in soapstone. Altarpiece and pulpit are from 1656. Idd church was heavily damaged in an earthquake on October 23, 1904. The quake occurred in the middle of a church service. Panic arose, but no one was injured. It was long doubt the church could be saved, but in 1922 it was fully restored.

Idd Church served as an election church (Norwegian: valgkirke) in 1814. Together with about 300 churches across Norway, it was a venue for elections to the 1814 Norwegian Constituent Assembly. These were Norway's first national elections.

== See also ==
- Skriverøya

== Other sources ==
- Dag Juvkam / Statistics Norway (1999). "Historisk oversikt over endringer i kommune- og fylkesinndelingen" (PDF) (in Norwegian).
