= John Hansen Sørbrøden =

Norwegian politician (1775–1857)

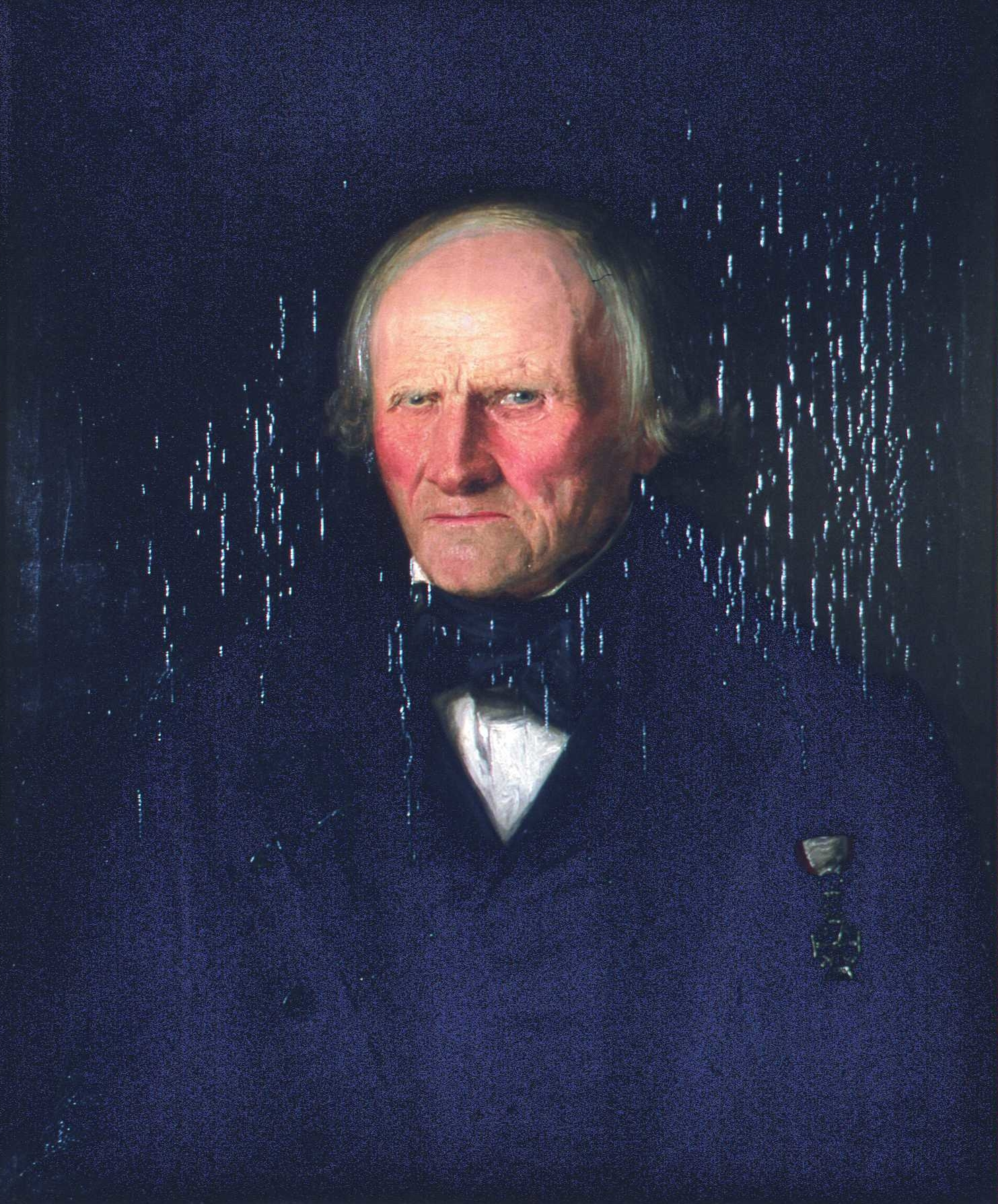
- Born: 3 May 1775; Berg, Østfold, Norway
- Died: 8 December 1857 (aged 82)
- Occupation(s): Farmer, lay preacher and politician
- Known for: Member of the Norwegian Constituent Assembly in 1814

John Hansen Sørbrøden (3 May 1775 – 8 December 1857) was a Norwegian farmer, lay preacher and politician.

He was born of the Sørbrøden in Berg parish in Østfold, Norway. He grew up within a farm family which figured prominently in the Haugean Movement (haugianere). The family farm became a Haugean center in the area.

He represented Smaalenene (now Østfold) at the Norwegian Constituent Assembly at Eidsvoll in 1814, and was elected member of the Parliament of Norway from 1833.
