= Bernt B. Lomeland =

Norwegian school educator (1836–1900)

Bernt Berntsen Lomeland (1836 – 1900) was a Norwegian school teacher and lay minister who established The Community (Samfundet) in 1890.

== Biography ==
Born to a farmer in Helleland, outside Egersund, Norway, he was confirmed on 29 September 1850. Beginning in 1855, Lomeland worked as a school teacher in the Helleland school district, a position he held for seven years. In 1862 he began a two-year teacher training program at Holt Seminary (today Kristiansand Teacher Training College) to formally become a teacher. He then took over a private school in Kristiansand from preacher Torkild Hammersmark. However, his salary was lower than what he earned as a public school teacher, so in 1868 he started his own bookshop. In 1869 there was a split among Hammersmark's friends over the writings of Carl Olof Rosenius, and they had to leave the chapel, located at Gyldenløvesgate 70.

In the late 1880s, several major church reforms were carried out in the Church of Norway, often called the "Great Liturgical Revision". There was some resistance among the laity, and in Kristiansand and Egersund the opposition was particularly strong. Lomeland became involved with the religious movement called the Strong Believers (Sterktroende) in Kristiansand. He first worked as a teacher at their school before becoming a preacher. In the 1870s and 1880s he was the editor of several religious journals.

Lomeland wanted to remain in the church. He saw it as his task to counteract heresy from within. But when a new altar book was introduced in 1889, that was the end: several Strong Believers in Helleland, Egersund, Søgne and Kristiansand resigned from the state church. Lomeland then rose to become a leading figure among the strong believers and became a key figure when the dissenter free church The Community (Samfundet) was established in 1890. During the church's first decade, he served as pastor and head teacher in Kristiansand and Egersund. He continued the teachings of the Strong Believers, which were based on Knud Spødervold's 1848 book Guds nådes husholdning ('The Dispensation of God's Grace'). Members of The Community are known locally as lomelenders in Kristiansand.

In the mid-1890s, the congregation had 470 members. Its greatest numbers were in the villages, especially Helleland. Lomeland worked hard for his life's work, and The Community had about 600 members at the turn of the century. His publications are still widely read among members of The Community.

Lomeland married Olevine Kristine Olsdatter (1843–1929) from Harkmark near Mandal in 1872. Four of their children reached adulthood.

Lomeland died on 1 March 1900 in Egersund.

== Publications ==
- De fire Evangelier i Harmoni (1870)
- Bibelgranskeren (Mandal 1875–1878)
- Bedømmelse av Rosenius's Bog: Hemmeligheder i Lov og Evangelium (Mandal 1881)
- Tiden (1884–1888)
- Er den nye høimesseliturgi overensstemmende med den bibelske liturgi? (1887)
- Den nye skriftemaalsordning (Mandal 1888)
- Bedømmelse af vort nye dåbsritual... (Kristiansand 1890)
- Tiden (1890–1900)
- Foredrag over Davids salmer (Ekersund 1896)
- Bibelhistorie for samfundsskolerne (Egersund 1896)
