= Skriverøya =

Peninsula in Norway

Coordinates: 59.0586°N 11.4094°E

Skriverøya is a peninsula in the Iddefjord in the municipality of Halden in Østfold county, Norway. Here, one can fine cultural artefacts from the Iron Age, including the largest Nordic swords, and warhammers.
