= Berg railway station =

Former railway station in Halden, Norway

Berg

General information
- Location: Berg, Halden, Østfold; Norway
- Coordinates: 59.125°N 11.293°E
- Line: Østfold Line
- Distance: 130.96 km (81.37 mi) from Oslo S
- Tracks: 4

Construction
- Architect: Peter Andreas Blix

History
- Opened: 4 February 1879
- Closed: 29 May 1983
- Rebuilt: 1986
Location
- Location within Østfold Location within Norway

Berg Station (Norwegian: Berg stasjon) is a closed railway station on the Østfold Line located at Berg in Halden, Norway. It is situated 130.96 kilometers (81.37 mi) from Oslo Central Station (Oslo S). Although disused as a passenger station, Berg still serves as a passing loop and a freight terminal, the Halden Terminal (Haldenterminalen).

The station was opened on 4 February 1879, a month after the Østfold Line. It received a wooden station building designed by Peter Andreas Blix, which was ultimately demolished in 1989. Passenger trains stopped calling at Berg from 29 May 1983 when only express train services remained south of Moss. Halden Terminal opened in 1986, but has struggled to become a viable operation.

== History ==
When the proposal to build the Østfold Line was put forward, Berg Municipality participated in the funding through purchasing shares for 4,000 Norwegian speciedaler in 1875. Next arose the discussion as to where the station should be located. Two proposals were made, one at Vestgård and one at Viksletten. The former would serve Rokke better, while the latter would serve Sponvika and the fish transport from there better. The railway company made the decision and placed the station at Vestgård. Berg Station was one of the original stations on the Østfold Line. However, the station did not open until 4 February 1879, a month after the line.

Berg soon received a second station, Døle, which opened on 9 December 1891. In 1928 there were three intermediate stations, mere flag stops, built between them—Hjelmungen, Gjellestad and Vik. An interlocking system as installed at Berg Station on 21 April 1931. The line past Berg was electrified on 11 November 1940. The station received centralized traffic control on 16 December 1974. This allowed it to become unstaffed from 1 August 1975.

In order to speed up transport times along the southern parts of the Østfold Line, NSB introduced their "InterCity" services in 1983. This involved the closing of a large number of stations with limited traffic. Passenger trains stopped calling at Berg Station from 29 May 1983.

=== Halden Terminal ===
The proposal for the Halden Terminal arose shortly after 1980, while Halden Municipality was searching for new industrial lots. The concept was that an intermodal terminal would be built near Halden, in the area between Sørli and European Road E6 known as Sørlifeltet. Trucks would arrive from various locations in Sweden and have their cargo transshipped to trains. These would then run directly to other locations in Norway, bypassing Alnabru Freight Terminal in Oslo. At the same time the site would be used as the center of a new industrial park.

NSB soon agreed to support the venture. A permit was secured to allow 24-meter (79 ft) trucks from Sweden to run to the terminal. The initiative led to the incorporation of Haldenterminalen A/S in 1983. The municipal council approved a terminal on the farms of Helle, Ødegård and Berger. Two issues then arose which postponed construction. The first was that Tollpost Globe, one of the major potential clients, pulled out because they were not allowed to buy the entire terminal. The municipality opposed a sale because they wanted a terminal open to any potential transport companies. Second, a dispute regarding agricultural conservation arose with demands that non-agricultural land be used for the terminal.

Permission was granted after a compromise was reached with the government after Brundtland's Second Cabinet took power in 1986. The terminal itself could be located at Sørlifeltet, while the industrial park was forced to move to a site made up of Vestgård, Svingen and Torpum. Because this was forested and more uneven terrain, the costs of earthworks were doubled. It also lost much of its advantage because it was no longer adjacent to the terminal.

Construction of the terminal cost 26 million Norwegian kroner. The delays caused NSB and Linjegods to instead establish Rolvsøy Terminal in Fredrikstad. Without customers, the terminal was a giant fluke and became nicknamed Tiananmen Square. In 1989 the operating company had a revenue of 14,495 kroner and operating costs of 5 million kroner. Major investors such as Kredittkassen and Selmer Furuholmen sold, with the municipality becoming the dominant owner. By 1991 only Myrene Transport had established itself in the area.

By 1991 the operating company was bankrupt. The terminal was bought by the municipality, who started a new operating company and were able to establish profitable operations. During the 1990s, Norske Skog Saugbrugs started using the terminal to export paper to Continental Europe. An agreement with Euro Shuttle was signed in 1998.

Traffic declined and by the 2000s the terminal was not in use. A Danish investor bought the terminal, but went bankrupt. Ringstad Næringsutvikling bought the terminal in 2011. Two years later they had asphalted an area of 1 hectare (2.5 acres) and were using it as a lumber terminal, sending a trainload of sawmill-grade lumber every other week to Sweden. The company then built a warehouse, which was completed in 2015. This allowed Kemetyl to move its warehouse to the terminal.

== Facilities ==
Berg Station is situated 130.96 kilometers (81.37 mi) from Oslo Central Station at an elevation of 11 meters (36 ft) above mean sea level. The Østfold Line past Berg is single track and electrified. The station has two passing loops, which are 768 and 308 meters (2,520 and 1,010 ft), respectively. Halden Terminal is a single 324-meter (1,063 ft) spur which makes a ninety-degree turn from the main line.

The station building was a standardized designed used throughout the Østfold Line, created by Peter Andreas Blix. The station building measured 110 square meters (1,200 sq ft) and had the same design as Ljan (original), Dilling, Rygge, Råde, Onsøy, Greåker, Sandesund, Skjeberg, Prestebakke and Kornsjø (original). The wooden building was asymmetrical and had Continental inspiration from Medieval and Neogothic architecture.

== Bibliography ==
- Bjørndal, Ivar (1998). "Fra vannkraft til datakraft – trekk fra Haldens historie i hundre og tredve år" (in Norwegian). Halden: Forum Bjørndalen.
- Bjerke, Thor; Holom, Finn (2004). Banedata 2004 (in Norwegian). Hamar / Oslo: Norwegian Railway Museum / Norwegian Railway Club. ISBN 82-90286-28-7.
- Langård, Geir-Widar; Ruud, Leif-Harald (2005). Sydbaneracer og Skandiapil – Glimt fra Østfoldbanen gjennom 125 år (in Norwegian). Oslo: Norwegian Railway Club. ISBN 978-82-90286-29-8.
- Uglum, Johs.; Torgersen, Olav (1938). Berg herred gjennom 100 år 1837–1937 (in Norwegian). Halden.

Preceding station		Following station
Vik	Østfold Line	Lundestad
