= Hans Nielsen Hauge =

Norwegian Lutheran minister, spiritual leader, entrepreneur, social reformer and author

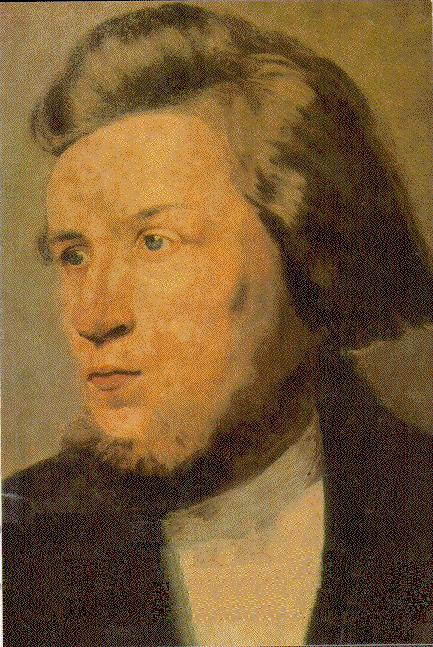
- Born: 3 April 1771; Rolvsøy, Tune, Norway
- Died: 29 March 1824 (aged 52); Christiania, Norway
- Venerated in: Lutheran Church
- Feast: Lutheran Church: 29 March

Hans Nielsen Hauge (3 April 1771 – 29 March 1824) was a 19th-century Norwegian Lutheran lay minister, spiritual leader, business entrepreneur, social reformer and author. He led a noted Pietism revival known as the Haugean movement. Hauge is also considered to have been influential in the early industrialization of Norway.

== Biography ==
Hans Nielsen Hauge was born the fifth of ten children in his ancestral farm of Hauge at Rolvsøy (Hauge på Rolvsøy) in the county of Østfold. His father was Niels Mikkelsen Evenrød (1732–1813) and mother Maria Olsdatter Hauge (1735–1811).

He had a poor and otherwise ordinary youth until 5 April 1796, when he received his "spiritual baptism" in a field near his farm. Within two months, he had founded a revival movement in his own community, written a book, and decided to take his mission on the road. He wrote a series of books in his lifetime. In a total of 18 years, he published 33 books. Estimates are that 100,000 Norwegians read one or more of them, at a time when the population was 900,000 more-or-less literate individuals.

In the next several years, Hauge traveled – mostly by foot – throughout much of Norway. He held countless revival meetings, often after church services. In addition to his religious work, he offered practical advice, encouraging such things as settlements in Northern Norway. He and his followers were persecuted, though their teachings were in keeping with Lutheran doctrine. He began preaching about "the living faith" in Norway and Denmark after a mystical experience that he believed called him to share the assurance of salvation with others. At the time, itinerant preaching and religious gatherings held without the supervision of a pastor were illegal, and Hauge was arrested several times.

Hauge faced great personal suffering and state persecution. He was imprisoned no less than 14 times between 1794 and 1811, accused of witchcraft and adultery, and of violating the Conventicle Act of 1741 (Konventikkelplakaten) at a time when Norwegians did not have the right of religious assembly without a Church of Norway minister present. The law "was not created to be used against Hauge, but it is almost only against Hauge that it was attempted to be used."

His time in prison broke his health and led to his premature death. Upon his release from prison in 1811, he took up work as a farmer and industrialist at Bakkehaugen near Christiania (now Oslo).

In 1815, he married Andrea Andersdatter, who later died in childbirth that same year. In 1817, he married Ingeborg Marie Olsdatter (1791–1872) and bought the Bredtvet farm (now the site of Bredtvet Church in Oslo), where he died. Three of his four children died in infancy. His surviving son, Andreas Hauge, became a priest in the Church of Norway and Member of the Norwegian Parliament.

== Haugean movement ==
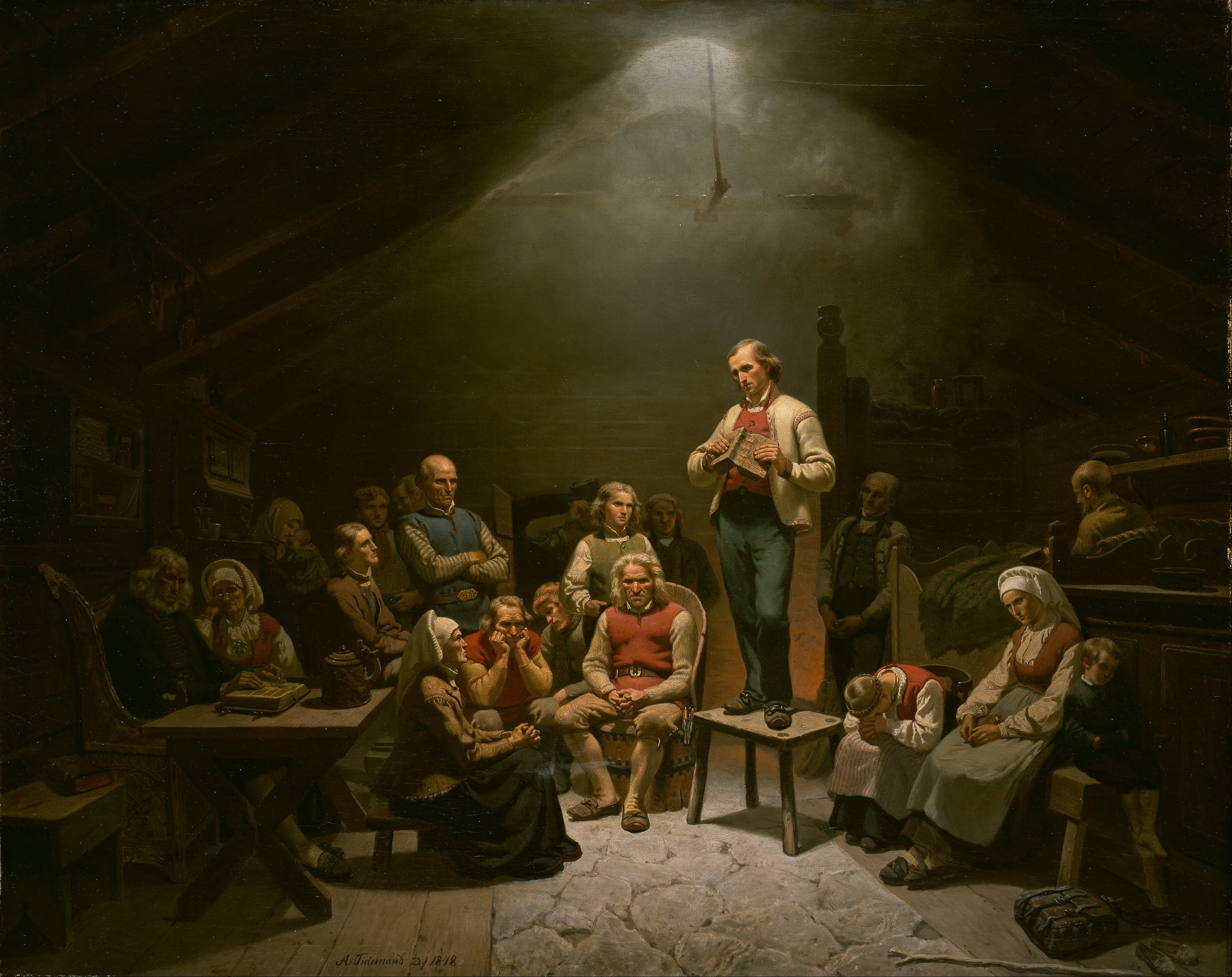
Haugianerne by Adolph Tidemand (1848–1852)

It is generally agreed that Hauge had a profound influence on both secular and religious history in Norway. Hauge's message emphasized the type of spirituality he felt originated with Martin Luther. He led charismatic meetings, and his organization became an informal network that in many ways challenged the establishment of the state church. As a result, he and his followers were persecuted in various ways. Hauge spent a total of nine years in prison.

Over time, the Haugean movement increased its influence throughout the country. Some figures might illustrate that fact. In the late eighteenth century a normal service at a church in Christiania would be attended by fewer than 20 people – of a population of nearly 10,000. Christianity in Norway was nearly becoming a framework for traditions, and ethics (from a Christian perspective) and spiritual life were nearly non-existent. It is not an exaggeration to state that Hauge revived the faith in most of Norway. Both men and women played a central role in this revival. The first female preacher of the Haugean movement was Sara Oust, who was active from the year 1799.

Turning to his achievements as an industrialist, the number of factories and mills that Hauge founded around the country were numerous. All but one disappeared during the industrial revolution, which in Norway took place in the mid-19th century. In 1809, the government temporarily released Hauge from prison so that he could construct salt factories to help alleviate the salt shortage caused by the British Blockade. Even so, his modesty prevented him from becoming a capitalist, and he gave away all he had founded and inspired to others – brethren and friends. During a period of extreme economic crisis, when almost all the prosperous timber barons and iron works owners went bankrupt because of the Napoleonic Wars, he showed a way to prosperity for anyone with initiative, and this led to the new rise in Norwegian economics some years after national independence in 1814. In this matter Hauge was but one of several contributors, but he was one of the most influential – especially so in the way he combined economics and Christian morals: modesty, honesty and hard work among them.

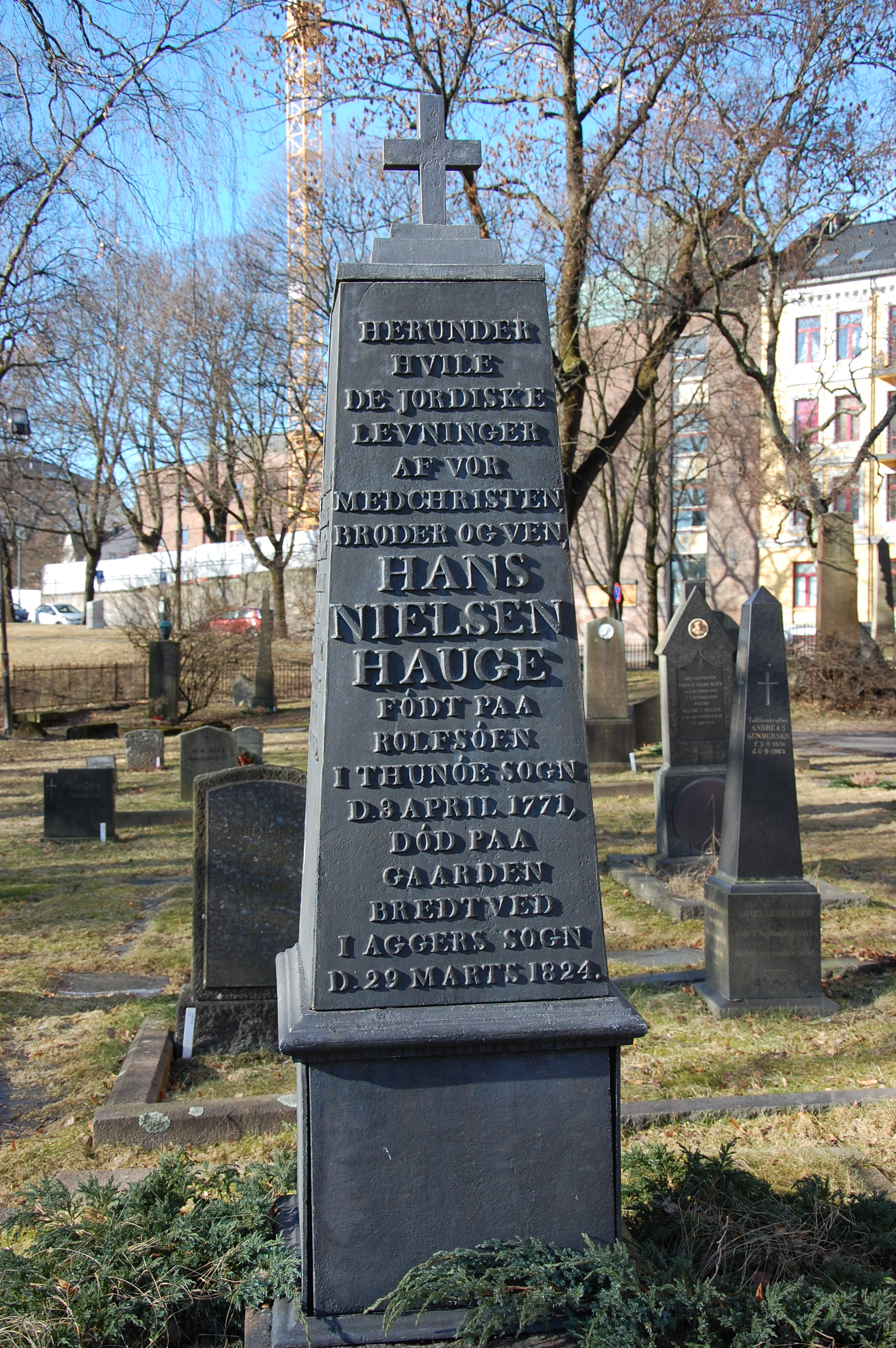
Hans Nielsen Hauge gravestone at Old Aker Church, Oslo

== Factors in influence ==
- His defiance toward the religious and secular establishment gave voice to ordinary people, paving much of the way for the liberal and democratic tradition in Norway.
- His theology, while bound in Lutheran doctrine, revitalized the notion of universal religion in Norway. The Norwegian state church credits him today for making religion a personal obligation.
- His travels created nationwide networks that persist in Norway's political system generally and among parties in particular.
- His advocacy for common people became an important force as the industrial revolution unfolded in Norway.

== Legacy ==
Many Haugeans launched industrial action, such as mills, shipyards, paper mills, textile industry and printing. They had often worked their way up to prosperity in a short time, a result of Haugean focus on diligence, economic enterprise and frugality. Three members of the constitutional assembly in Eidsvoll belonged to his movement.

Because Hauge's preaching coincided with the years during which many Norwegians were migrating to America, the Haugean influence on Lutheranism in America has been considerable. The Lutheran Church in America had a Hauge Synod, Eielsen Synod and Lutheran Free Church all indicative of that influence. Hauge is remembered on the liturgical calendar of the Evangelical Lutheran Church in America on March 29 as one of the Renewers of the Church.

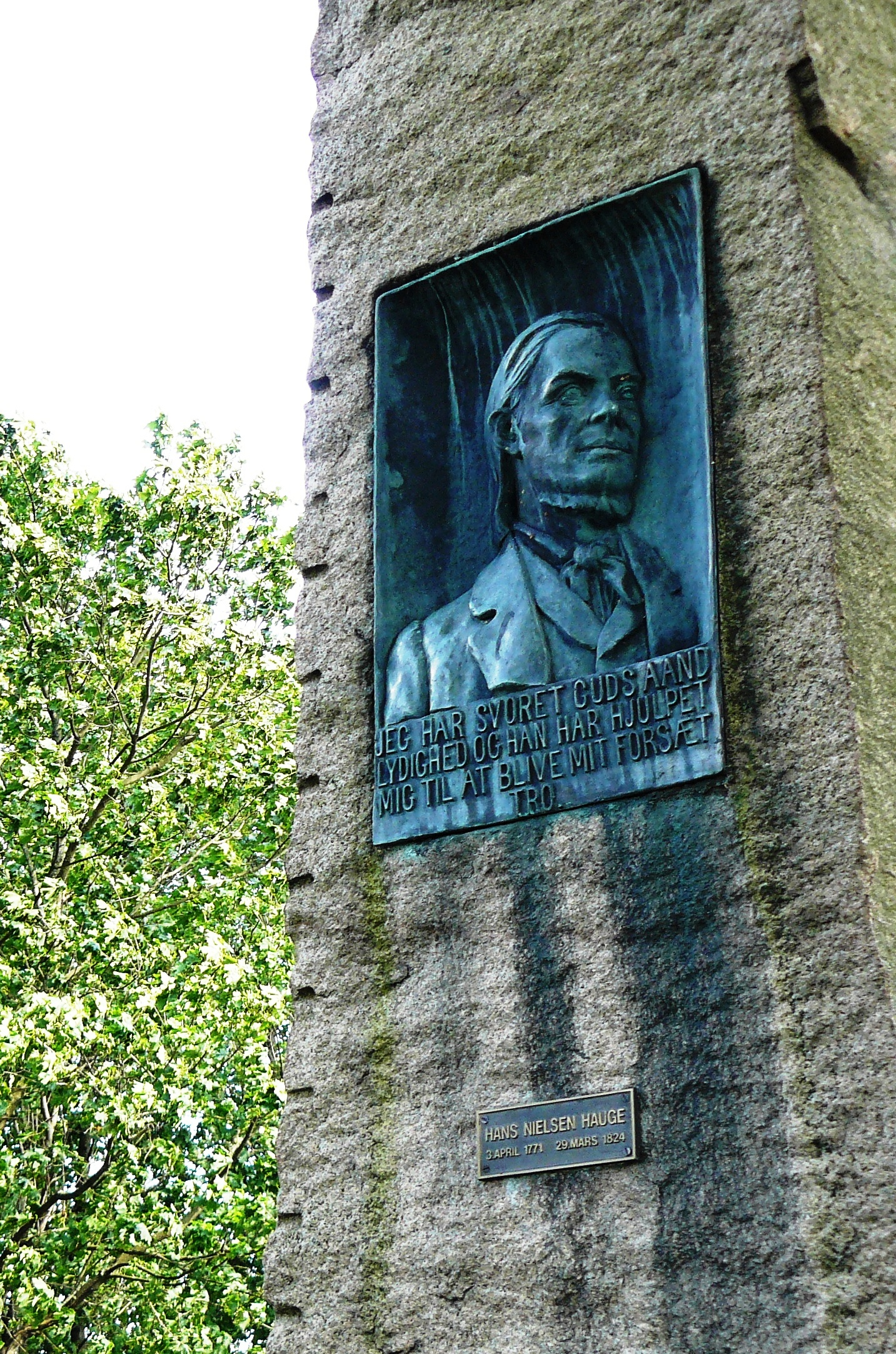
Obelisk at Bredtvet Church outside Oslo erected in memory of Hans Nielsen Hauge

== Hauge Institute ==
The Hauge Institute (Haugeinstituttet) was founded in 2005. The institute seeks to raise awareness about Hauge, his ethical thinking and topicality and to impart inspiration to the business and educational community as well as society in general. Based on his thinking and practice, the Hauge Institute focuses on the ethical dimension in three main areas: leadership, entrepreneurship, and trade and the environment. The Hauge Institute has several professional partners. Two of the most important are St. Olaf College in Northfield, Minnesota, and the Norwegian School of Economics in Bergen, Norway.

== Selected works ==
- Betragtning over Verdens Daarlighed, 1796
- Forsøg til en Afhandling om Guds Viisdom, 1796
- De Enfoldiges Lære og Afmægtiges Styrke, 1798
- De sande Christnes udvalgte Psalmebog, 1799
- Den christelige Lære, forklaret over Epistlerne og Evangelierne, 1800
- Forklaring over Loven og Evangelium, 1804
- Om religiøse Følelser og deres Værd, 1817
- Religeuse Sange, 1819
- Huus-Postil, 1822
- Udtog af Kirke-Historien, 1822
- Hans Nielsen Hauges Testamente til sine Venner, 1821

== Memorials ==
- Hans Nielsen Hauge Memorial Museum – in Rolvsøy, located between Fredrikstad and Sarpsborg, near the site of his birthplace
- Hans Nielsen Hauge Monument – Concordia College, located in Founders Court, near Old Main, Moorhead, Minnesota.
- Hans Nielsen Hauge Memorial Chapel – Free Lutheran Bible College and Seminary, Plymouth, Minnesota.
- Hans Nielsen Hauge Memorial – Bredtvet Church in Oslo located on the site of the Bredtvet farm
- Hans Nielsen Hauge statue – Uranienborg Park in the neighborhood of Uranienborg in Oslo
- Hans Nielsen Hauges vei – street in Rolvsøy
- Hans Hauges gate – street in the Bergenhus borough of Bergen
- Hans Nielsen Hauges gate – street in Hamar
- Hauges gate – street in Drammen
- Hans Nielsen Hauges gate and Hans Nielsen Hauges plass – both streets located in Oslo
- Hans Nielsen Hauge memorial coin – In 2021 a 20 kroner created by sculptor Håkon Anton Fagerås commissioned by Norges Bank, celebrating the 250th anniversary of Lutheran minister.

== Other sources ==
- Aarflot, Andreas (1979) Hans Nielsen Hauge, his life and message (Augsburg Publishing House, Minneapolis, MN.) ISBN 978-0-8066-1627-8
- Arnesen, Daniel (2001) Haugianske vennebrev (P. Øverland) ISBN 978-82-90936-33-9 (Norwegian)
- Bull, Jacob Breda (1912) Hans Nielsen Hauge (Kristania: Steen'ske Bogtrykkeri Og Forlag) ISBN 978-1-161-19331-2
- Pettersen, Wilhelm (2008) The Light In The Prison Window: The Life Story of Hans Nielsen Hauge (Kessinger Publishing, LLC) ISBN 978-1-4366-7790-5
- Hauge, Alfred (1947) Hans Nielsen Hauge: Guds vandringsmann (Ansgar) ISBN 978-82-503-0463-5 (Norwegian)
- Shaw, Joseph M. (1979) Pulpit Under the Sky: A Life of Hans Nielsen Hauge (Greenwood Press Reprint) ISBN 978-0-313-21123-2
- Sjursen, Finn Wiig (1993) Den haugianske periode, 1796-ca. 1850 (NLA-forlaget) ISBN 978-82-7468-020-3 (Norwegian)
- Thorvaldsen, Steinar (2010) A Prophet Behind the Plough, Hans Nielsen Hauge and his Ministry(University of Tromsø) ISBN 978-82-7389-210-2
