= Jacob Breda Bull =

Norwegian author, journalist and editor

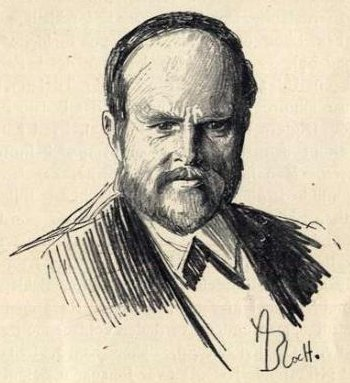
Jacob Breda Bull illustration by Andreas Bloch

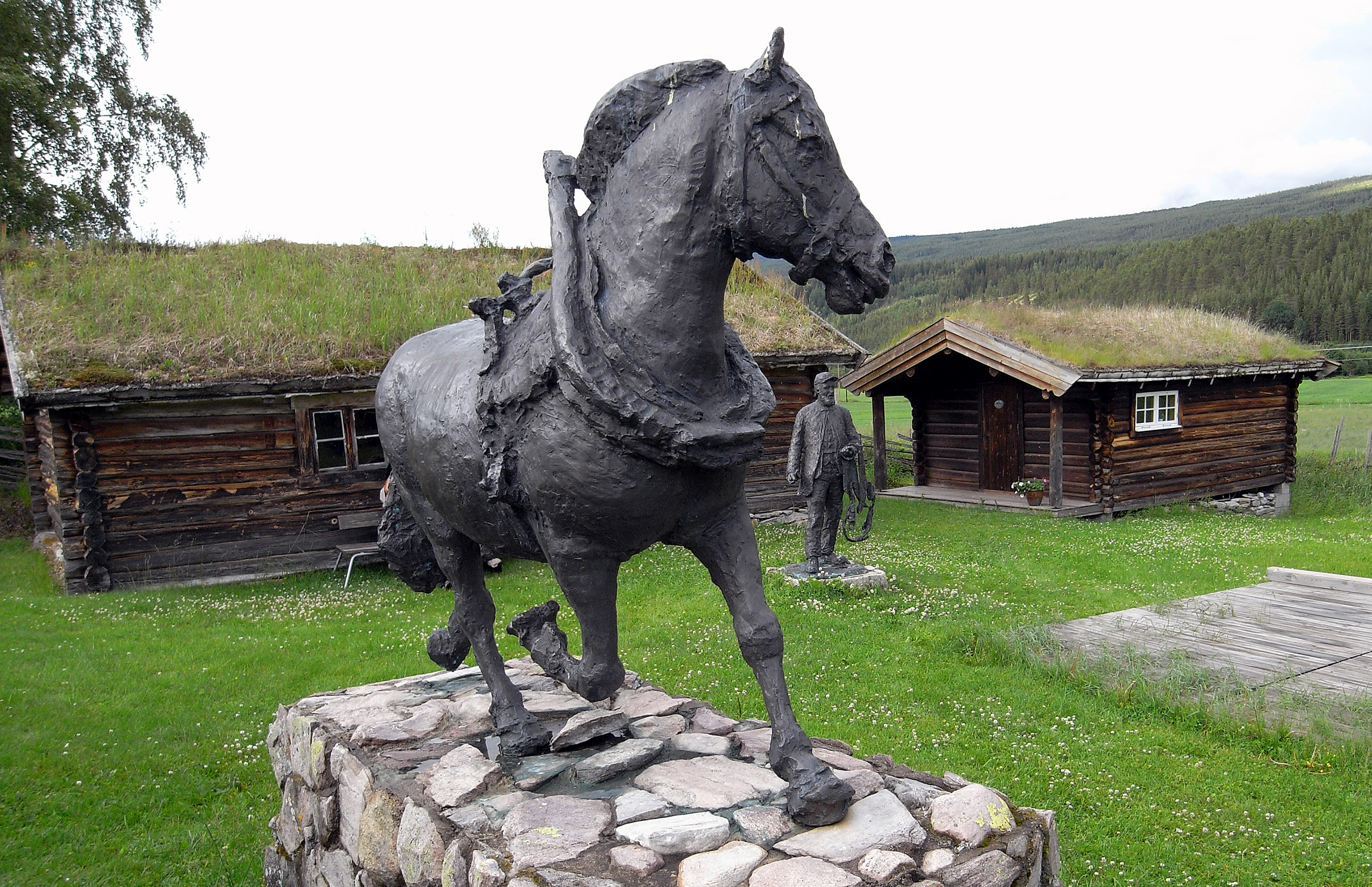
Statue depicting Vesleblakken in the courtyard of the Bull Museum in Rendalen

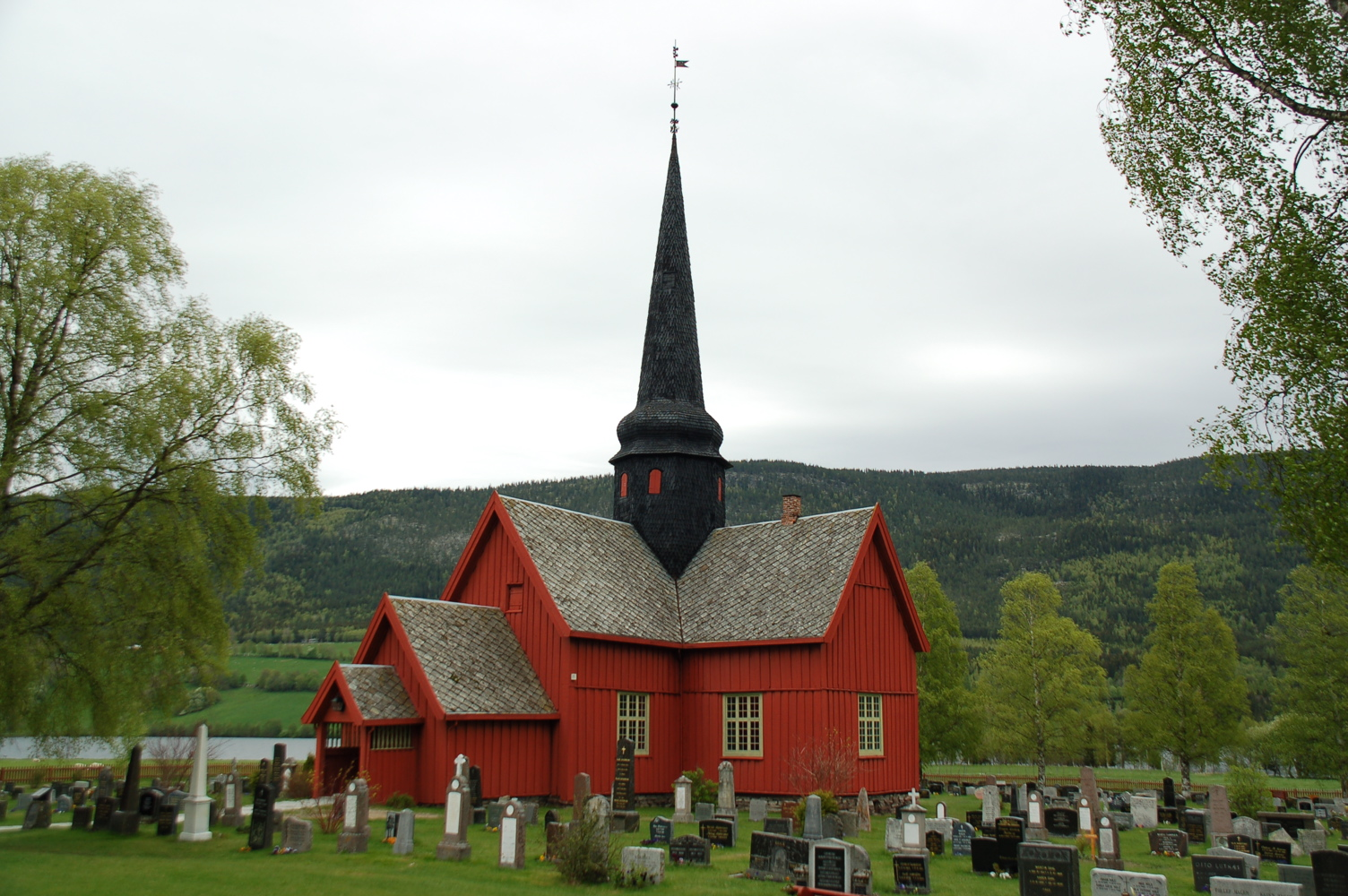
Ytre Rendal Church

Jacob Breda Bull (28 March 1853 – 7 January 1930) was a Norwegian author, journalist and editor.

== Biography ==
Jacob Bull was born at Rendal Municipality in Hedmark, Norway. He was the son of parish priest Mathias Bull (1815–1876) and Henriette Margrethe Breda (1817–1887). In May 1876 he graduated with a cand.theol. degree and received the university title "haud laudibilis" (not without praise). He then served a year as a teacher at Nickelsen's Girls' School in Kristiania (now Oslo). In April 1878 he founded the newspaper Dagen and subsequently earned his living as a journalist. He served as leader of the Norwegian Authors' Union from 1900 to 1903.

His debut novel Paa Grænsen was published in 1879. Bull is best known as the author of the short story Vesleblakken. The story about the horse named Vesleblakken is based upon a childhood memory from the author's upbringing in Rendalen. The story was first published in Skisser (1891). His other novels and stories often described folk life in the valley of Østerdalen. He also wrote historical novels, contemporary novels and poetry. In 1911, Bull became a Knight 1st grade in the Order of St. Olav. After 1914, he resided in Copenhagen where he died during 1930.

== Personal life ==
He married Gunvor Sophie Rytter Saws (1843–1882) on 29 December 1876, and was married a second time with Swedish-born Anna Maria Augusta Bergløf (1854–1922) on 9 January 1883. He was the father of poet Olaf Bull (1883–1933) and grandfather of author Jan Bull (1927–1985). Jacob Breda Bull died during 1930 and was buried at Ytre Rendal Church (Ytre Rendal Kirke).

The former church rectory in Rendalen where he grew up is now the Bull Museum (Bull-Museet). Opened in 1964, it is a biographical and cultural history museum. Since 1997, Rendalen municipality has annually awarded Vesleblakkenprisen, named after Bull's most notable work, to individuals or organizations who have excelled in altruistic work.

== Filmography ==
- Glomdalsbruden (directed by Carl Theodor Dreyer, 1926)

== Related reading ==
- Giovanni Bach (1938) The History of the Scandinavian Literatures (edited by Frederika Blankner, 1938, Dial Press, Inc., New York)
- Derry, T.K. (1972). A History of Modern Norway:1814–1972. (Clarendon Press, Oxford). ISBN 0-19-822503-2.
- Harold S. Naess (1993) A History of Norwegian Literature (University of Nebraska Press) ISBN 978-0803233171
