= The Community (Samfundet) =

Norwegian Christian denomination

The Community (Norwegian: Menigheten Samfundet) is a Christian denomination with historical and theological roots in the Lutheran tradition. The church has congregations located in the south-western part of Norway. The Community broke off from the Church of Norway in 1890 due to recent theological and liturgical developments within the church. A key figure in the founding of The Community was school teacher and lay preacher, Bernt B. Lomeland (1836–1900). The Community was split in 1900 after Lomeland's death, and Per O. Nodland founded The Catholic Community (Det Almindelige Samfund, catholic here in the sense of 'universal'). The Community was split again in 1925 and as a result The Old Lutheran Community was founded. As of 2015, the Community has approximately 1,800 members in two congregations, with four churches, one meeting house, and four schools.

The Community is not a member of any ecumenical organization, as they consider themselves to be the only known rightful church. The Community has a literalist understanding of the Bible and holds conservative views on issues, such as women's rights, LGBT rights, contraception, and abortion.

== History ==
The theology of The Community can be traced back to the so-called "Strong Believers" (Sterktroende) in the early 19th century. This was a religious movement in the south-western parts of Norway, which emphasized purity in theology and particularly a preservation of the traditional theology of the Lutheran Reformation. At first this was a movement loyal to the Church of Norway. However, as this church introduced revised versions of traditional hymnals, catechisms, Bible translations, as well as liturgy, this movement became increasingly hostile towards the Church of Norway.

Bernt B. Lomeland was among the key figures in the founding of The Community. For some time, he tried to convince the authorities within the Church of Norway to occasionally allow the use of the previous liturgy. When this failed he established The Community and approximately 500 people followed him. Within the first decade several churches were built, as well as schools. The theology of the church was also consolidated in this period. After Lomeland's death, his successor, Per O. Nodland, was blamed of not being of "the same spirit" as Lomeland and for criticizing his teachings. Nodland was therefore excluded and about 200 members of the congregation in Egersund followed him as he founded The Catholic Community. The congregation in Kristiansand suffered a similar conflict in 1925, when the congregation's assistant pastor was excluded. A small group followed him and established The Old Lutheran Community. This church later joined the Church of Norway.

A dominant figure in the following years was Nicolay Fardal (1883–1960), who was pastor in the congregation in Kristiansand from 1928 to 1960. During his time as a pastor the adherents to The Community grew and there were few theological disputes. This period of growth and theological harmony lasted until the early 1990s, when the church's ban on trousers for women was challenged. This controversy was solved by allowing the members of the church to follow their conscience when it comes to dressing appropriately and decently. The years that followed brought several liberalizations and reforms.

== Theology ==
The church identifies as an Evangelical Lutheran denomination, with its foundation in the Bible, the Apostles', Nicene and Athanasian Creeds, Luther's Small Catechism and the Augsburg Confession. However, The Community has several distinct teachings which distinguish them from the mainstream Lutheran denominations. Most importantly, The Community only recognizes baptisms performed in churches where the Word is rightly preached and the sacraments are properly administered. Since the church considers itself to be the only known church that does preach the Word rightly and administer the sacraments properly, they do not recognize baptism performed anywhere else; in 2012, they decided to continue the practice. The church used only Bibles in Blackletter script until close to the turn of the 21st century.

== Structure ==
The church is governed by a board, known as The Community Board (Norwegian: Samfundsstyret). This board consists of 12 men elected by the congregations. Both men and women have the right to vote, although only men can be elected. The Community Board has the theological responsibility of the church. The congregations' pastors and assistant pastors are normally elected, and thus have a seat at the board.

The congregations also have a local board. These are made up of the local representatives of the congregation in The Community Board. The pastors are also elected by the congregation, often among the teachers at the church's schools. Only men can serve as pastors; they usually serve until retirement.
