= The Picture of Dorian Gray (disambiguation) =

The Picture of Dorian Gray is an 1890 novel by Oscar Wilde.

The Picture of Dorian Gray may also refer to:

== Films ==
- The Picture of Dorian Gray (1913 film), an American silent short film by Phillips Smalley
- The Picture of Dorian Gray (1915 film), an American film directed by Eugene Moore
- The Picture of Dorian Grey (1915 film), a Russian film directed by Vsevolod Meyerhold
- The Picture of Dorian Gray (1916 film), a British film directed by Fred W. Durrant
- The Picture of Dorian Gray (1917 German film), a German film directed by Richard Oswald
- The Picture of Dorian Gray (1917 Hungarian film), a Hungarian film directed by Alfréd Deésy
- The Picture of Dorian Gray (1945 film), an American film directed by Albert Lewin
- The Picture of Dorian Gray (1973 film), an American television film directed by Glenn Jordan
- The Picture of Dorian Gray (2004 film), an American film starring Josh Duhamel

== Songs ==
- "The Picture of Dorian Gray", a song by Nirvana (UK)
- "A Picture of Dorian Gray", a song by Television Personalities from ...And Don't the Kids Just Love It

== Other uses ==
- The Picture of Dorian Gray (telenovela), a 1969 Mexican telenovela
- The Picture of Dorian Gray (1976 TV), a BBC Play of the Month production directed by John Gorrie
- The Picture of Dorian Gray (opera), a 1996 opera by Lowell Liebermann
- The Picture of Dorian Gray (play), a 2020 play by Kipp Williams

== See also ==
- Adaptations of The Picture of Dorian Gray, for further films, books, plays and musicals based on the novel
- Dorian Gray (disambiguation)
