= Dorian Gray (character) =

Fictional character

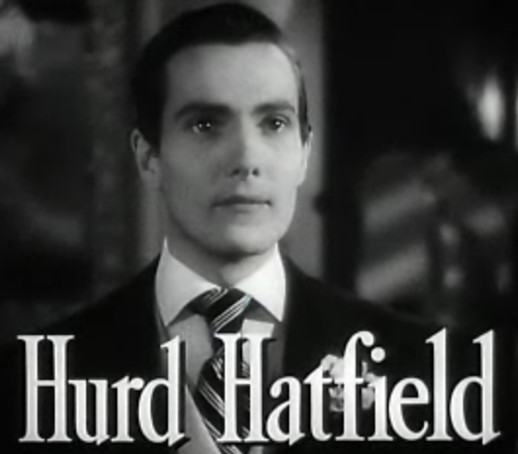
- Hurd Hatfield as Gray in the 1945 film
- First appearance: The Picture of Dorian Gray
- Created by: Oscar Wilde

In-universe information
- Family: Lord Kelso (grandfather), Lady Margaret Devereux (mother)
- Significant others: Sibyl Vane, Hetty Merton
- Relatives: Philip Herbert, Lady Elizabeth Devereux, George Willoughby, Lord Beckenham II
- Nationality: English

Dorian Gray is a popular character in literature and the anti-hero of Oscar Wilde's 1890 novel The Picture of Dorian Gray. He is an aristocratic Victorian man.

== Fictional character biography ==
Dorian is the grandson of the late Lord Kelso. Dorian's mother, Lady Margaret Devereux, was portrayed as a beautiful aristocrat who married below her class without the consent of her father. Lord Kelso then paid a man to provoke Dorian's father, a junior military officer, into a duel, leading to the death of Dorian's father. Margaret then returned to Kelso's home, but died soon after. It is revealed that Lord Kelso raised Dorian until Kelso's death, but that the two had a mutual dislike for each other.

The summary below deals with the longest version, the 1891 novel. However, certain episodes describe in particular Dorian's encounter with (and subsequent murder of) James Vane. This does not appear in the version originally submitted by Wilde for publishing.

The Picture of Dorian Gray begins on a summer day in Victorian England, where Lord Henry Wotton, an opinionated man, is observing the sensitive artist Basil Hallward painting a portrait of Dorian Gray, a handsome young man, who is Basil's ultimate muse. While posing for the painting, Dorian listens to Lord Henry espousing his hedonistic worldview and begins to think that pursuits of pleasure are the only things in life worth pursuing. This prompts Dorian to wish that his painted image would age instead of himself.

Under the hedonistic influence of Lord Henry, Dorian fully explores his sensuality. He discovers the actress Sibyl Vane, who performs Shakespeare in a dingy working-class theatre. Dorian approaches and courts her and soon proposes marriage. The enamored Sibyl calls him "Prince Charming" and swoons with elation at the prospect of true love. However, her protective brother James warns that if "Prince Charming" harms her, he will murder him.

Dorian invites Basil and Lord Henry to see Sibyl perform, but she is too enamored with Dorian to act and performs poorly. This causes both Basil and Lord Henry to think that Dorian has fallen in love with Sibyl because of her beauty instead of her acting talent. Embarrassed, Dorian rejects Sibyl, telling her that acting was her beauty and without that, she no longer interests him. On returning home, Dorian notices that the portrait has changed; his wish has come true, and the man in the portrait bears a subtle sneer of cruelty.

Conscience-stricken and lonely, Dorian resolves to reconcile with Sibyl, but he is too late as Lord Henry informs him that Sibyl has committed suicide by swallowing prussic acid. Dorian then understands that, where his life is headed, lust and good looks will serve him well. He locks the portrait up, and over the following eighteen years, he experiments with every vice possible, influenced by a morally poisonous French novel that Lord Henry Wotton gave him. The narrative does not reveal the title of the French novel, but, at trial, Wilde said that the novel referred to in Dorian Gray was À rebours (Against Nature, 1884) by Joris-Karl Huysmans, but then denied that the book is the one to which he referred.

One night, before leaving for Paris, Basil visits Dorian's house to ask him about various rumors regarding his vulgar self-indulgence. Dorian does not deny his debauchery and takes Basil to see the portrait. The portrait has become so hideous that Basil is only able to identify it as his work by the signature that he affixes to all his portraits. Basil is horrified and beseeches Dorian to pray for salvation. In anger, Dorian blames his fate on Basil and stabs him to death. Dorian then calmly blackmails an old friend, the scientist Alan Campbell, into using his knowledge of chemistry to destroy the body. Alan later takes his own life as a result of the shameful collaboration.

To escape the guilt of his crime, Dorian goes to an opium den, where James Vane is unknowingly present. James had been seeking vengeance upon Dorian ever since Sibyl killed herself, but he had no leads to pursue; the only thing he knew about Dorian was the name Sibyl called him, "Prince Charming". In the opium den, however, he hears someone refer to Dorian as "Prince Charming", and he accosts Dorian. Dorian deceives James into believing he is too young to have known Sibyl, who killed herself eighteen years earlier, as his face is still that of a young man. James relents and releases Dorian, but is then approached by a woman from the opium den who reproaches James for not killing him. She confirms the man was Dorian Gray and explains that he has not aged in eighteen years. James runs after Dorian, but he has left.

James then begins to stalk Dorian, causing him to fear for his life. However, during a shooting party, one of its members accidentally kills James Vane, who was lurking in a thicket. On returning to London, Dorian tells Lord Henry that he will live righteously from then on. His new probity begins with a resolution not to break the heart of the naïve Hetty Merton, his current romantic interest. Dorian wonders if his new-found goodness has reverted the corruption in the picture, but when he looks, he sees only an even uglier image of himself. From that, Dorian understands that his true motives for moral reformation were, in fact, immoral, due to their being merely a means to a selfish end.

Deciding that only full confession will absolve him of his wrongdoing, Dorian decides to destroy the only piece of evidence remaining of his crimes – the picture. In a rage, he takes the knife with which he murdered Basil and stabs the picture. The servants of the house awaken on hearing a cry from the locked room; on the street, a passerby who also heard the cry calls the police. On entering the locked room, the servants find an unknown old man, stabbed in the heart, his face and figure withered and decrepit. The servants identify the disfigured corpse as Dorian by the rings on its fingers; beside him is the picture of Dorian Gray, restored to its original beauty.

== Depictions on screen and stage ==
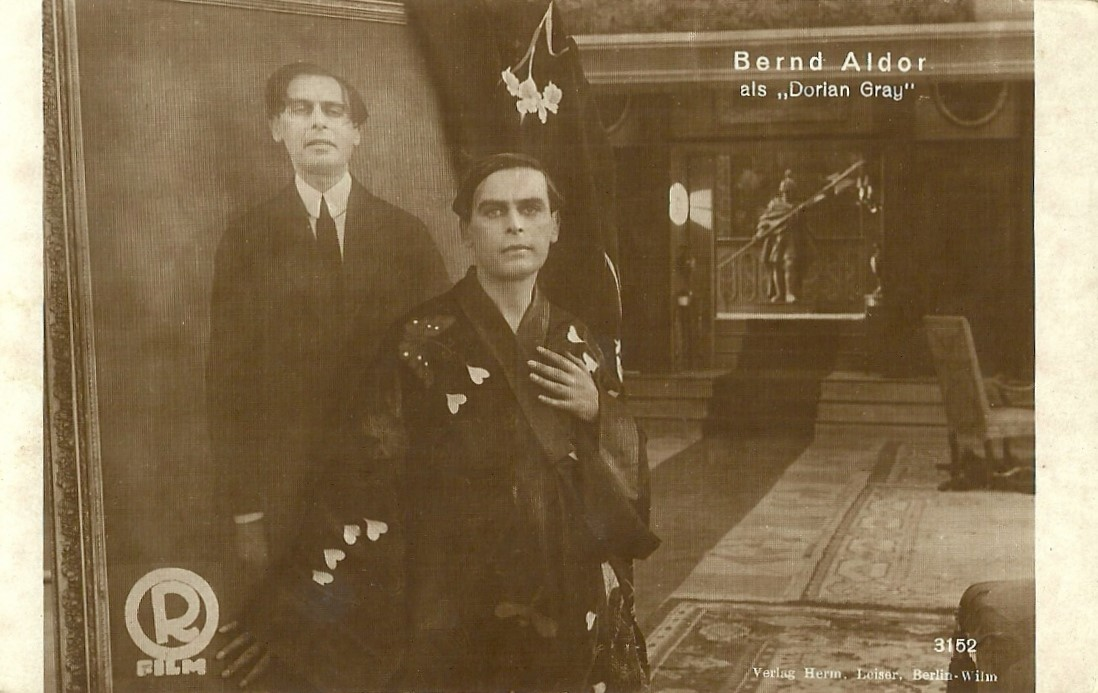
A postcard showing Bernd Aldor as Dorian Gray from the 1917 film

- Dorian Grays Portræt (1910)
  Directed by Axel Strøm
  Starring Valdemar Psilander as Dorian Gray
- The Picture of Dorian Gray (1913)
  Directed by Phillips Smalley
  Starring Wallace Reid as Dorian Gray
- The Picture of Dorian Gray (1915)
  Directed by Eugene Moore
- The Picture of Dorian Grey (1916)
  Directed by Vsevolod Meyerhold and Mikhail Doronin
- The Picture of Dorian Gray (1916)
  Directed by Fred W Durrant; screenplay by Rowland Talbot
  Starring Henry Victor as Dorian Gray
- Das Bildnis des Dorian Gray (1917)
  Directed by Richard Oswald; screenplay by Richard Oswald
  Starring Bernd Aldor as Dorian Gray
- Az Élet királya (1918)
  Directed by Alfréd Deésy; screenplay by József Pakots
  Starring Norbert Dán as Dorian Gray
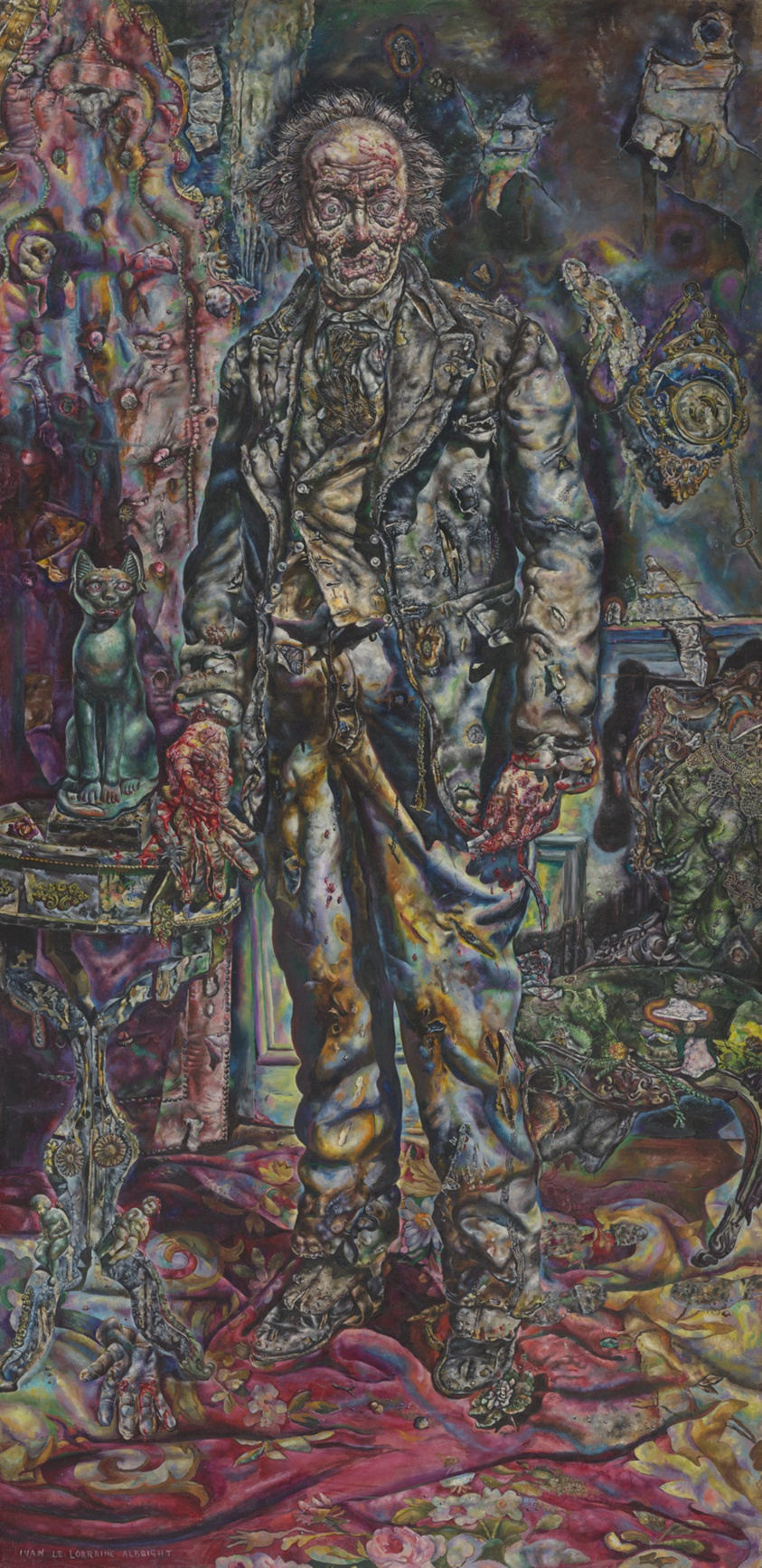
- A late stage of the painting (created by Ivan Albright) in the 1945 film, showing Dorian Gray's degrading soul
  The Picture of Dorian Gray (1945)
  Directed by Albert Lewin; screenplay by Albert Lewin
  Starring Hurd Hatfield as Dorian Gray
- Armchair Theatre: The Picture of Dorian Gray (1961) (made-for-television)
  Directed by Charles Jarrott
  Starring Jeremy Brett as Dorian Gray
- Golden Showcase: The Picture of Dorian Gray (1961) (made-for-television)
  Directed by Paul Bogart; screenplay by Jacqueline Babbin and Audrey Maas
  Starring John Fraser as Dorian Gray
- Das Bildnis des Dorian Gray (1961) (made-for-television)
  Directed by Wilhelm Semmelroth
  Starring Sebastian Fischer as Dorian Gray
- El Retrato de Dorian Gray (1969): A telenovela produced by Televisa
  Directed and produced by Ernesto Alonso
  Starring Enrique Álvarez Félix as Dorian Gray
- Dorian Gray, also known as The Evils of Dorian Gray or The Secret of Dorian Gray (1970)
  Directed by Massimo Dallamano; screenplay by Marcello Coscia; Massimo Dallamano and Günter Ebert
  Starring Helmut Berger as Dorian Gray
- The Picture of Dorian Gray (1973) (made-for-television)
  Directed by Glenn Jordan; screenplay by John Tomerlin
  Starring Shane Briant as Dorian Gray
- The Picture of Dorian Gray (1976) (made-for-television)
  Directed by John Gorrie; screenplay by John Osborne
  Starring Peter Firth as Dorian Gray
- Le Portrait de Dorian Gray (1977)
  Directed by Pierre Boutron; screenplay by Pierre Boutron
  Starring Patrice Alexsandre as Dorian Gray
- The Sins of Dorian Gray (1983) (made-for-television)
  Directed by Tony Maylam; screenplay by Ken August and Peter Lawrence
  Starring Belinda Bauer as a female Dorian Gray
  This version sees Dorian Gray as an actress and photographic model who becomes immortal, while an audition tape she made ages for her.
- Dorian Gray in the Mirror of the Yellow Press (1984)
  Directed by Ulrike Ottinger; written by Ulrike Ottinger
  Starring Veruschka von Lehndorff as a female Dorian Gray and Delphine Seyrig as Frau Dr. Mabuse
- The League of Extraordinary Gentlemen (2003)
  Directed by Stephen Norrington, produced by (and starring) Sean Connery
  Starring Stuart Townsend as Dorian Gray (in this movie, well above 200, considered "immortal", impervious to weapons, and after betraying the League, is killed by Mina Harker revealing his own portrait to him.)
- Pact with the Devil, also known as Dorian (2004)
  Directed by Allan A. Goldstein; screenplay by Peter Jobin and Ron Raley
  Starring Ethan Erickson as Louis/Dorian
- Dorian (2004)
  Written and Directed by Brendan Dougherty Russo
  Starring Andrew Vanette as Dorian Gray
- The Picture of Dorian Gray (2004)
  Directed by David Rosenbaum; screenplay by David Rosenbaum
  Starring Josh Duhamel as Dorian Gray
- The Picture of Dorian Gray (2006)
  Directed by Duncan Roy; screenplay by Duncan Roy
  Starring David Gallagher as Dorian Gray
- The Picture of Dorian Gray (2007)
  Directed by Jon Cunningham; screenplay by Jon Cunningham and Deborah Warner
- The Picture (of Dorian Gray) (2009)
  Directed by Jonathan Courtemanche; script by Neal Utterback
  Starring Hanna Dillon, Lawrence Evans, and Miles Heymann
- Dorian Gray (2009)
  Directed by Oliver Parker; screenplay by Toby Finlay
  Starring Ben Barnes as Dorian Gray
- Penny Dreadful (2014–2016)
  Created by John Logan
  Starring Reeve Carney as Dorian Gray
- The Librarians (2014–2018)
  Created by John Rogers
  Starring Luke Cook as Dorian Gray
- Chilling Adventures of Sabrina (2018–2019)
  Created by Roberto Aguirre-Sacasa
  Starring Jedidiah Goodacre as Dorian Gray
- The Picture of Dorian Gray (2020, 2024)
  Directed by Kip Williams
  Starring Eryn Jean Norvill (Sydney production) and Sarah Snook (London production) as Dorian Gray and 25 other characters
