= Dorian Gray (disambiguation) =

Dorian Gray is the main character of the novel The Picture of Dorian Gray (1890) by Oscar Wilde.

Dorian Gray may also refer to:

== Film ==
- Dorian Gray (1970 film), an Italian film adaptation of the novel
- Dorian Gray (2009 film), a British film adaptation of the novel

== People ==
- Dorian Gray (actress) (1931–2011), the stage name of the Italian film actress Maria Luisa Mangini
- Dorian Gray (British singer), the stage name of English pop singer Tony Ellingham
- Soren Mounir, a Swiss singer-songwriter also known as "Dorian Gray"

== Other uses ==
- Dorian Gray (club), a nightclub in Frankfurt am Main, Germany
- Dorian Gray (band), a 1980s Croatian music group
- Dorian Gray (Bourne), a contemporary dance adaptation of the novel

== See also ==
- Adaptation of The Picture of Dorian Gray, for further books, films, musicals and plays based on the novel
- The Picture of Dorian Gray (disambiguation)
