= Adaptations of The Picture of Dorian Gray =

List of adaptations of Oscar Wilde's "The Picture of Dorian Gray"

Oscar Wilde's The Picture of Dorian Gray (1890) has inspired many cinematic, literary, and artistic adaptations.

== On screen ==
Chronological by release or broadcast.

=== Theatrical films ===
- Dorian Grays Portræt (1910)
  Directed by Axel Strøm. Starring Valdemar Psilander as Dorian Gray.
- The Picture of Dorian Gray (1913)
  Directed by Phillips Smalley. Starring Wallace Reid as Dorian Gray; Lois Weber, and Smalley. With the screenplay by Weber.
- The Picture of Dorian Gray (1915)
  Directed by Eugene Moore.
- The Picture of Dorian Grey (1915)
  Directed by Vsevolod Meyerhold and Mikhail Doronin.
- The Picture of Dorian Gray (1916)
  Directed by Fred W Durrant; screenplay by Rowland Talbot. Starring Henry Victor as Dorian Gray; Sydney Bland as Basil Hallward; Jack Jordan as Henry Wotton; Pat O'Malley as Sibyl Vane.
- Das Bildnis des Dorian Gray (1917)
  Directed by Richard Oswald; screenplay by Richard Oswald. Starring Bernd Aldor as Dorian Gray; Ernst Ludwig as Basil Hallward; Ernst Pittschau as Henry Wotton; Lea Lara as Sibyl Vane.
- Az Élet királya (1918) transl. The Royal Life
  Directed by Alfréd Deésy; screenplay by József Pakots. Starring Norbert Dán as Dorian Gray; Bela Lugosi as Henry Wotton.
- The Picture of Dorian Gray (1945, USA)
  Directed by Albert Lewin; screenplay by Albert Lewin. Starring Hurd Hatfield as Dorian Gray; Lowell Gilmore as Basil Hallward; George Sanders as Henry Wotton; Angela Lansbury as Sibyl Vane; Sir Cedric Hardwicke as the narrator.
  Lansbury was nominated for the Academy Award for Best Supporting Actress. Considered by many to be the best version, although a love interest not found in the novel appears: Basil Hallward's niece played by Donna Reed. The film won the Academy Award for Best Cinematography, and is remarkable for its crisp, deep-focus black-and-white photography, and a handful of Technicolor inserts of the portrait, which exists in two versions: one representing Basil Hallward's original effort, painted by Henrique Medina, and the corrupted portrait, by noted painter of macabre and grotesque subjects Ivan Albright. The picture took Albright a year to finish and currently hangs at the Art Institute of Chicago.
- Dorian Gray, also known as Il dio chiamato Dorian, The Evils of Dorian Gray or The Secret of Dorian Gray (1970, Italian-German-British)Directed by Massimo Dallamano; screenplay by Marcello Coscia, Massimo Dallamano and Günter Ebert; produced by Harry Alan Towers, Sam Arkoff. Starring Helmut Berger as Dorian Gray; Richard Todd as Basil Hallward; Herbert Lom as Henry Wotton; Marie Liljedahl as Sibyl Vane.
- Dorian Gray im Spiegel der Boulevardpresse (1984)also known as Dorian Gray in the Mirror of the Yellow Press, and The Image of Dorian Gray in the Yellow Press
  This is a West German film directed and written by Ulrike Ottinger, starring Veruschka von Lehndorff as Dorian Gray, Delphine Seyrig as Frau Dr. Mabuse, boss of an international media empire, and Tabea Blumenschein as Andamana.
- Dorian Gray (2009, British)
  Directed by Oliver Parker; screenplay by Toby Finlay; produced by Barnaby Thompson. Starring Ben Barnes as Dorian Gray; Ben Chaplin as Basil Hallward; Colin Firth as Henry Wotton.
- The Picture of Dorian Gray (2021, British)
  Adapts Dorian as a modern social media influencer in an online world fixated by selfies and streaming. Directed by Tamara Harvey; screenplay by Henry Filloux-Bennett. Starring Fionn Whitehead, Alfred Enoch, Joanna Lumley, Russell Tovey, and Stephen Fry.

=== Television ===
- Armchair Theatre: The Picture of Dorian Gray (1961) (made-for-television)
  Directed by Charles Jarrott. Starring Jeremy Brett as Dorian Gray; Dennis Price as Lord Henry Wotton; John Bailey as Basil Hallward; Jill Ireland as Sibyl Vane.
- Golden Showcase: The Picture of Dorian Gray (1961) (made-for-television)
  Directed by Paul Bogart; screenplay by Jacqueline Babbin and Audrey Maas. Starring Sir Cedric Hardwicke as the Narrator, John Fraser as Dorian Gray; George C. Scott as Lord Henry Wotton; Louis Hayward as Basil Hallward; Susan Oliver as Sibyl Vane.
- El Retrato de Dorian Gray (1969): A telenovela produced by Televisa
  Directed and produced by Ernesto Alonso. Starring Enrique Álvarez Félix as Dorian Gray.
- Get Smart: Age Before Duty, Season 5, Episode 11, original airdate December 5, 1969
  In this episode of Get Smart, a KAOS scientist invents a gray paint that, when used to re-touch photographs of CONTROL agents so as to make them appear old, causes the agent himself to age and die. The paint is given the name Dorian Gray.
- The Picture of Dorian Gray (1973) (made-for-television)
  Directed by Glenn Jordan; screenplay by John Tomerlin; produced by Dan Curtis. Starring Shane Briant as Dorian Gray; Charles Aidman as Basil Hallward; Nigel Davenport as Henry Wotton; Vanessa Howard as Sibyl Vane.
  This film, which was presented as an entry in ABC's series The Movie of the Week, was produced by Dan Curtis, who was previously the creator/producer of the ABC afternoon daytime Gothic soap opera Dark Shadows, which featured a storyline clearly inspired by Wilde's novel, in which a portrait of Quentin Collins aged grotesquely, while Collins himself remained youthful. Made virtually immortal by the portrait, Collins, a man born in 1870, turned up at his ancestral home 100 years later using the pseudonym Grant Douglas, the initials of which (though reversed, perhaps so as to avoid being too obvious) may have been a nod to the character of Dorian Gray.
- The Picture of Dorian Gray (1976) (made-for-television)
  Directed by John Gorrie; screenplay by John Osborne. Starring Peter Firth as Dorian Gray; Jeremy Brett as Basil Hallward; John Gielgud as Henry Wotton; Judi Bowker as Sibyl Vane.
- Le Portrait de Dorian Gray (1977)
  Directed by Pierre Boutron; screenplay by Pierre Boutron. Starring Patrice Alexsandre as Dorian Gray; Denis Manuel as Basil Hallward; Raymond Gérôme as Henry Wotton; Marie-Hélène Breillat as Sibyl.
- Blake's 7: Rescue (1981) Season 4, Episode 1, original airdate September 28, 1971
- The Sins of Dorian Gray (1983) (made-for-television)
  Directed by Tony Maylam; screenplay by Ken August and Peter Lawrence. Starring Belinda Bauer as a female Dorian Gray; Anthony Perkins as Henry Lord
  This version sees Dorian Gray as an actress and photographic model who becomes immortal, while an audition tape she made ages for her.
- Man of the People (Star Trek: The Next Generation) [1992]
  An ambassador uses women as receptables for his negative emotions which kills them including almost Deanna Troi; however she is saved while he is overwhelmed by emotions and dies of Old age.
- Pact with the Devil, also known as Dorian (2004)
  Directed by Allan A. Goldstein; screenplay by Peter Jobin and Ron Raley. Starring Ethan Erickson as Louis/Dorian; Malcolm McDowell as Henry Wotton; Amy Sloan as Sibyl.
- Dorian (2004)
  Written and Directed by Brendan Dougherty Russo. Starring Andrew Vanette as Dorian Gray; Stephen Fontana as Basil Hallward; Michael Multari as Henry; Danielle Matarese as Sibyl Vane.
- The Picture of Dorian Gray (2004)
  Directed by David Rosenbaum; screenplay by David Rosenbaum. Starring Josh Duhamel as Dorian Gray; Rainer Judd as Basil Ward; Branden Waugh as Harry Wotton (Lord Wotton is referred to as both Harry and Henry in the novel); Darby Stanchfield as Sibyl Vane; Brian Durkin as James Vane.
- The Picture of Dorian Gray (2006)
  Directed by Duncan Roy; screenplay by Duncan Roy. Starring David Gallagher as Dorian Gray, Noah Segan as Basil Hallward and Aleksa Palladino as Sybil Vane.
- The Picture of Dorian Gray (2007)
  Directed by Jon Cunningham; screenplay by Jon Cunningham and Deborah Warner.
- The Picture (of Dorian Gray) (2009)
  Directed by Jonathan Courtemanche; script by Neal Utterback. Starring Hanna Dillon, Lawrence Evans, and Miles Heymann.
- Netflix has announced a new series where Dorian and Basil are brothers.

== Audio ==
- The Picture of Dorian Gray has been produced as an audio-book many times, with narrators including Hurd Hatfield (who starred as "Dorian" in the 1945 film), Martin Shaw, Edward Petherbridge, Simon Callow, Simon Prebble, Simon Vance, Stephen Fry, Rupert Graves, Michael Sheen, Steven Crossley, Greg Wise and Michael Page.
- An adaptation of the story was broadcast on ABC's Mystery Time in 1957 starring Laurence Olivier as Lord Henry Wotten.
- An adaptation of the story was broadcast on the CBC's Stage Series in 1950 with Mavor Moore as Basil Hallward.
- An adaptation of the story was broadcast on the CBS Radio Mystery Theater on August 7, 1974.
- A two-part adaptation of the novel by Nick McCarty was broadcast on BBC Radio 4, subsequently on BBC Radio 7 and BBC Radio 4 Extra, starring Ian McDiarmid as Henry Wotton and Jamie Glover as Dorian.
- An audio adaptation of the novel starring Alexander Vlahos and dramatised by David Llewellyn and directed by Scott Handcock was released by Big Finish Productions in 2013. as a prequel to Big Finish's audio drama series The Confessions of Dorian Gray, which also starred Vlahos in the title role.
- Shadows at the Door: The Podcast released a three-episode production in 2022, adapted by Mark Nixon.

== Literature ==
- Family Portrait (also published as Picture of Evil, 1985) is a horror novel by Graham Masterton in which he appropriates Wilde's aging portrait to a whole family.
- Mirror, Mirror (1992), a horror novel by DE Athkins that updates the setting to a high school and makes the protagonist a female. After being befriended by a mysterious new student who gives her a mirror as a birthday present, Dore finds her reflection becoming more and more ugly, even as she appears lovelier, coinciding with her increasingly nasty personality.
- Dorian: A Sequel to the Picture of Dorian Gray(1997) is a novel written by Jeremy Reed; in this novel, Dorian has survived the destruction of the portrait and suffers the consequences as a visibly old and ugly man.
- "The Wedding Present", a short story in the anthology Smoke and Mirrors (1998) by Neil Gaiman re-imagines the story from the perspective of a modern newlywed wife. Characters in "The Wedding Present" make several references to the similarities between their situation and the original novel.
- Dorian, an Imitation (2002) is a modern take of the original book, written by Will Self. It updates the original by placing events in June 1981, a time according to Self when "Britain was in the process of burning most of its remaining illusions."
- The Detritus of Dorian Gray is the name of a 2003 book of poems written by Kevin Max, which includes an entry also titled The Detritus of Dorian Gray.
- A Portrait of Dorian Gray (2005) is the fashion designer and photographer Karl Lagerfeld's rendition of the novel in photography. The models Larry Scott and Eva Herzigova star as Mr. and Mrs. Dorian Gray.
- The Picture of Dorian Gray (2007) is a graphic novel adaptation by Roy Thomas for Marvel Illustrated.
- Creatures of Will and Temper (2017) by Molly Tanzer is a gender-swapped spin on the story. In the book's preamble, Tanzer states her intention to reimagine the novel's central quest for hedonism without moral judgment, writing that "if [the original] truly were amoral, as Wilde maintains, Dorian's excesses would not corrupt his perfect painted image." Her version notably omits the key role of the eponymous portrait.

== Plays and musicals ==
=== Music theatre and opera ===
- A Hungarian musical based on the novel was composed by Mátyás Várkonyi, while Gunar Braunke and János Ács wrote its libretto. It premiered in Rockszínház in 1990. The English version of the musical (translated by Duncan Shiels) premiered in London in 1995. The German-language version of Dorian Gray (Michael Kunze, Gunar Braunke) toured in Germany for years, and also in the Netherlands, France and Switzerland.
- In 2000, Dorian, a musical with book, music & lyrics by Richard Gleaves, premiered at the Goodspeed Opera House starring Tom Stuart and Sutton Foster (as the invented character of Sister Claire)
- The Canadian playwright Ted Dykstra and lyricist Steven Mayoff wrote a musical Dorian. The musical premiered in 2002 and is set in the late 1900s, with the character of Dorian transformed from a member of the idle rich to an aspiring young model.
- In 2006, a Czech musical based on the novel premiered in Prague.
- A musical adaptation of the book by young theatre company Kangaroo Court ran at the Tabard Theatre, Chiswick in 2008. The updated version centres on celebrity obsession and excesses.
- Dorian the Remarkable Mister Gray: A Portrait in Music, is a stage musical with music, lyrics, and book by Randy Bowser. The work had its premiere at Pentacle Theatre in Salem, Oregon, in 2008. A Russian version is being produced in Moscow, at The Stas Namin Cente.
- In January 2009, Dorian Gray was adapted and directed by Linnie Reedman, with music by Joe Evans. Produced by Ruby In The Dust, the show returned to the Leicester Square Theatre on 26 June 2009, and again re-staged in March 2010 under the title of The Extraordinary Cabaret of Dorian Gray.
- An operatic version was created by Lowell Liebermann. Liebermann stated that "the book made an impression on [him] as no other book has yet done". Premiered at the Monte Carlo Opera in 1996.
- In February 2013, Dorian Gray was adapted into a musical by Callum Nicholls, a postgraduate composer at Cardiff University School of Music, and was performed by the school's students in Cardiff University Concert Hall.
- In 2016, CJeS Culture staged a Korean musical adaptation, scripted by Cho Yong-shin and composed by Kim Moon-jeong, with Kim Junsu playing the titular role.
- In the summer of 2017, an adaptation by Christopher Dayett and Kevin Mucchetti debuted at the New York Musical Theater Festival.
- In 2024, a Lithuanian student opera, adapted by students of the National M. K. Čiurlionis School of Art and based on the novel, premiered in Vilnius.

=== Plays ===
- A theatrical production of The Picture of Dorian Gray was staged by John Osborne at London's Greenwich Theatre in 1975.
- Playwrights Greg Eldridge and Liam Suckling adapted the novel into a three-act play. This premiered in May 2008 and returned as part of the Melbourne Fringe Festival in October.
- In 2008, Canadian playwright Ian Case adapted the story as a site-specific 90-minute grand-guignol style production, staged at Robert Dunsmuir's Craigdarroch Castle in Victoria, B.C., the most recent in a series of Halloween productions.
- In 2010, Dorian Gray was adapted by Daniel Mitura and directed by Henning Hegland. Music by Michael Nyman. The show premiered at the Kirk Theatre on in New York.
- On March 7, 2011, Wesley Taylor played the title role in a reading for a stage adaptation penned by playwright Michael Raver. It was directed by Quinten Gordon and co-starred Lauren Molina.
- 2013 saw an immersive staging in a townhouse in Greenwich, London. It was reprised in 2014 and 2015.
- In August 2014, The Picture (of Dorian Gray), a modern adaptation derived and performed by the Gravity Partners of Juniata College in Huntingdon, Pennsylvania, was shown at the New York International Fringe Festival.
- In 2020, an adaptation written and directed by Kip Williams was staged at Roslyn Packer Theatre, Sydney. The Sydney Theatre Company production featured one actor playing 26 characters, with video screens used to simulate interactions between characters. It was reprised in 2022, first touring to the Adelaide Festival, then Sydney, followed by ten weeks at the Playhouse, Arts Centre Melbourne. It received four Sydney Theatre Awards and four Melbourne Green Room Awards in 2022 and 2023 respectively. In January 2024 it opened at London's Theatre Royal Haymarket starring Sarah Snook, and won two Olivier Awards for Best Actress and Best Costume Design. The production transferred to Broadway's Music Box Theatre in 2025, where it won Tony Awards for Best Actress in a Play and Best Costume Design in a Play.
- In July 2020, amid the COVID-19 pandemic, a one-person show based on the book was performed by Billy Christopher Maupin at Firehouse Theatre in Richmond, Virginia.
- In Autumn 2026, Seán Aydon, Manchester School of Theatre, directed his own adaptation in a touring production around Britain by the company Tilted Wig, as a co-production with the Watford Palace Theatre.

=== Dance ===
- The contemporary dance adaptation Dorian Gray by choreographer Matthew Bourne debuted at the Edinburgh International Festival in August 2008.
