= Wesley Taylor =

American stage actor and writer (born 1986)

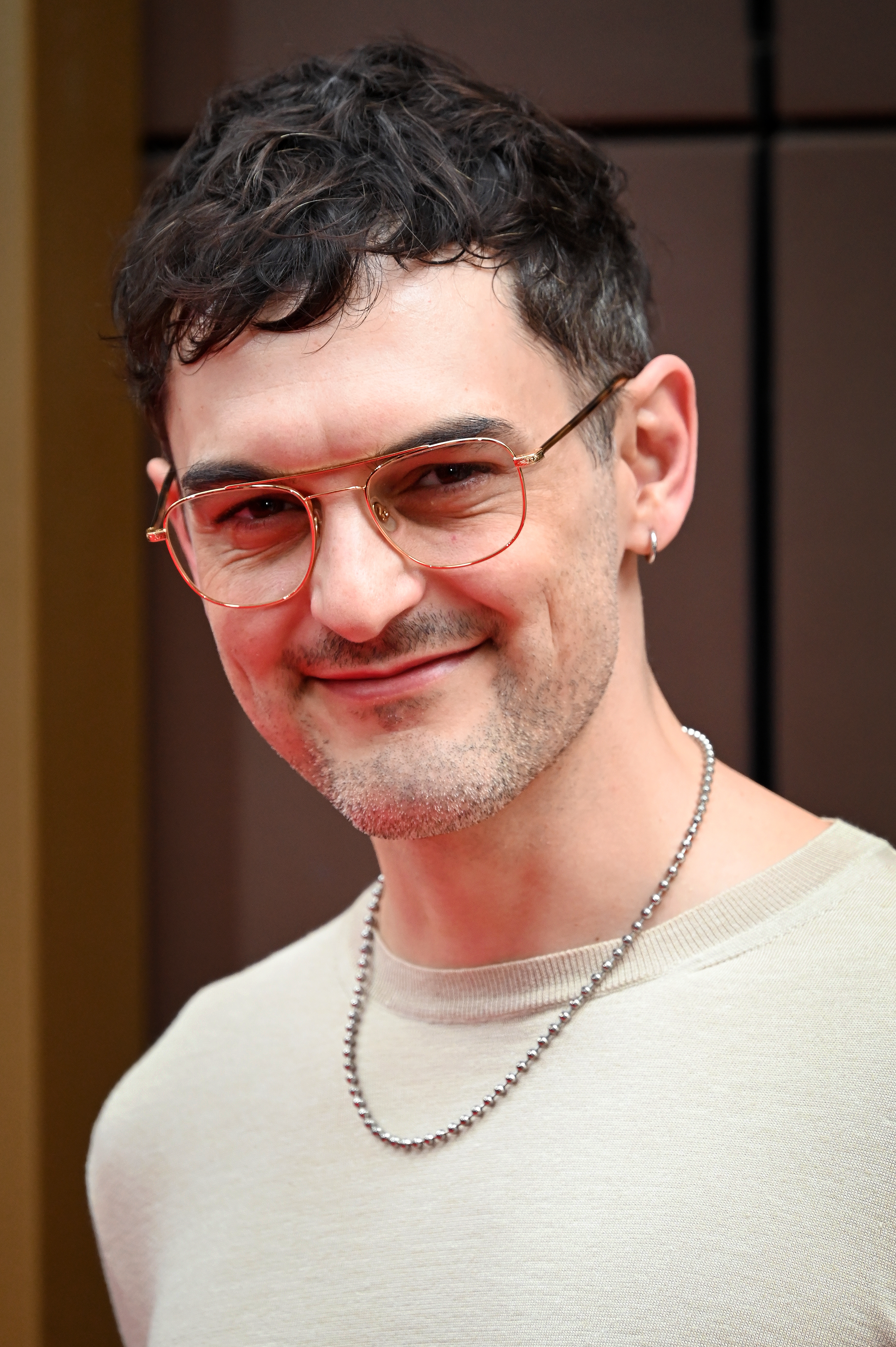
- Taylor in 2026
- Born: August 13, 1986 (age 40); Elizabeth, New Jersey, U.S.
- Education: University of North Carolina School of the Arts (BFA)
- Occupations: Actor, singer, writer, dancer
- Years active: 2008–present
- Partner: Isaac Cole Powell (2017–2021)
- Awards: Theatre World Award (Rock of Ages)

Wesley Taylor (born August 13, 1986) is an American stage actor and writer, best known for his work in musical theatre and television.

== Theatre career ==
In summer 2008, Taylor performed in Barrington Stage Company's production of the musical See Rock City and Other Destinations. The show won Richard Rodgers and Jerry Bock Awards. Taylor made his Broadway debut in the rock musical Rock of Ages, where he originated the role of the German city developer Franz. He won a Theatre World Award for this role and was nominated for an Outer Critics Circle Award.

His second major role on Broadway was as Lucas Beineke, Wednesday's love interest, in the musical The Addams Family, a role he originated after previously playing the role in the 2009 Chicago production of the show. The show premiered on Broadway in April 2010, with Taylor appearing alongside Krysta Rodriguez, who played Wednesday Addams, Lucas' love interest. He left the role on March 8, 2011.

On March 7, 2011, Taylor played the title role alongside Lauren Molina in a reading for a stage adaptation of Oscar Wilde's The Picture of Dorian Gray, penned by playwright Michael Raver. On April 2, 2011, Taylor, Erin Davie, Ann Harada, Kendrick Jones, and Burke Moses performed the concert, Broadway Tribute in Northport, Long Island at the Engeman Theater. The concert performance featured "the performers re-creating songs they performed on Broadway."

He then starred as Michael "Mouse" Tolliver in the world-premiere musical Tales of the City (based on the book series by Armistead Maupin), which began performances on May 18, 2011, in San Francisco at the American Conservatory Theater, directed by Jason Moore. After three extensions, Tales of the City closed on July 31, 2011.

Taylor played the role of God in An Act of God in 2016 at the Denver Center. Taylor played the role of Sheldon Plankton opposite Stephanie Hsu as Karen Plankton in the Broadway musical adaptation of SpongeBob SquarePants, which opened on December 4, 2017. Taylor played the role of The Mad Hatter in Alice by Heart at the Robert W. Wilson MCC Theater, which opened on February 26, 2019.

== Other projects ==
He has appeared on television in One Life to Live, Live! with Regis and Kelly, The Today Show, Good Morning America, and Late Night with Conan O'Brien. Taylor played Bobby on NBC series Smash. Taylor co-wrote and starred alongside Alex Wyse in the webseries "Indoor Boys", playing the character Luke.

Since early 2009, Taylor and former Rock of Ages co-stars have maintained a YouTube web series titled Billy Green. The series deals with an up-and-coming actor Billy Green, who arrives in New York City but has no idea how to act around established performers, constantly giving away his resume. Billy Green's main cast stars Taylor as Billy and Jackie Hoffman as his over-protective mother. The idea came about during Taylor's senior year at drama school:

... I was looking for a short comic scene for the showcase, our presentation for casting directors and agencies. I could not find anything that I thought was funny enough or not overdone. My classmate E.J. Cantu and I wrote a scene called "The Audition," revolving around a guy named Carson who is auditioning for Death of a Salesman and a clueless, brand-new-to-the-city boy named Billy who sits next to Carson in the waiting room. That sketch became the premise for the pilot of Billy Green.

Taylor also participated in a reading for a play called A Dog's Tale (or The Thing About Getting) at the Kennedy Center. In addition, Taylor has written several short plays: Star-Crossed, The Game, and The Delivery Boy. His latest project, What's So Funny?, received a developmental reading on August 12, 2011, at Ripley-Grier Studios in Manhattan.

== Personal life ==
Taylor was born in Elizabeth, New Jersey, and raised in Orlando, Florida. He is half Puerto Rican, and his parents once resided in China, where they taught at a university: "[I]t's kind of hard for them to come and see the shows I'm in. I always get a little jealous of other people's families ... But my parents – I love them and I totally respect them. They kind of didn't want to settle into being bored in middle age, and they wanted to start over and move to a different country."

Taylor graduated from the theatre magnet at Dr. Phillips High School and holds a Bachelor of Fine Arts in acting from North Carolina School of the Arts. At the latter, Taylor performed as Falstaff in Henry IV, Part 1 and Part 2 and Action in West Side Story.

== Theater credits ==
| Year | Title | Role | Theatre | Director(s) |
|---|---|---|---|---|
| 2008-09 | Rock of Ages | Franz | New World Stages | Kristin Hanggi |
| 2009 | Rock of Ages | Franz | Brooks Atkinson Theatre | Kristin Hanggi |
| 2009–10 | The Addams Family | Lucas Beineke | Oriental Theatre | Julian Crouch and Phelim McDermott |
| 2010-11 | The Addams Family | Lucas Beineke | Lunt-Fontanne Theatre | Julian Crouch and Phelim McDermott |
| 2011 | Tales of the City | Michael | American Conservatory Theater | Jason Moore |
| 2013 | Little Miss Sunshine | Josh / Kirby | Second Stage Theater | James Lapine |
| 2015 | Cabaret | The Emcee | Signature Theatre | Matthew Gardiner |
| 2016-17 | An Act of God | God | Garner Galleria Theatre | Geoffrey Kent |
| 2017-18 | SpongeBob SquarePants, The Broadway Musical | Sheldon Plankton | Palace Theatre | Tina Landau |
| 2019 | Alice by Heart | Mad Hatter / Harold Pudding / Mock Turtle / Pigeon / Knave of Spades | MCC Theater | Jessie Nelson |
| 2019 | The Who's Tommy | Kevin | Kennedy Center | Joshua Rhodes |
| 2021-22 | Assassins | Giuseppe Zangara | Classic Stage Company | John Doyle |
| 2022 | Assassins | Giuseppe Zangara | Stephen Sondheim Theatre | John Doyle |
| 2023 | The 12 | Tom | Goodspeed Opera House | John Doyle |
| 2025 | Titanic | J. Bruce Ismay | Ogunquit Playhouse | Shaun Kerrison |
| 2026 | Oh, Mary! | Mary's Teacher | North American Tour | Sam Pinkleton |

== Filmography ==
=== Films ===
| Year | Title | Role | Notes |
|---|---|---|---|
| 2014 | Lucky Stiff | Train waiter | |
| 2017 | Wildman | Wildman | Short film |
| 2020 | The Surrogate | Dave | |
| 2026 | Movin’ On Up | Darren | Short Film |

=== Television ===
| Year | Title | Role | Notes |
|---|---|---|---|
| 2010 | Billy Green | Billy Green | 10 episodes |
| 2011 | One Life to Live | Barton | Episode dated 02.15 |
| 2012–13 | Smash | Bobby | 26 episodes |
| 2014 | The Tomorrow People | Monty the Magnificent | Episode: "Smoke and Mirrors" |
| 2015 | Looking | Milo | Episode: "Looking for Home" |
| 2015 | The Good Wife | Todd Dipple | Episode: "Loser Edit" |
| 2017 | I'm Dying Up Here | Ken | Episode: "Girls Are Funny, Too" |
| 2017 | Difficult People | Lyle | Episode: "Bernie and Blythe" |
| 2017–19 | Indoor Boys | Luke | 24 episodes |
| 2019–20 | The Two Princes | Prince Darling of the North | 7 episodes |
| 2023 | Only Murders in the Building | Clifford "Cliff" DeMeo | 6 episodes Nominated – Screen Actors Guild Award for Outstanding Performance by an Ensemble in a Comedy Series |

== See also ==
- LGBT culture in New York City
- List of LGBT people from New York City
- NYC Pride March
