= Dorian Gray (Bourne) =

Matthew Bourne's Dorian Gray is a contemporary dance adaptation of Oscar Wilde's 1890 novel, The Picture of Dorian Gray, by choreographer Matthew Bourne. The show made its debut in August 2008 at the Edinburgh International Festival and transferred to Sadler's Wells Theatre in London in September 2008. The music was composed by Terry Davies for a rock quintet directed from the keyboard. The set and costumes were designed by Lez Brotherston.

== Modern setting ==
Various changes are made to the story, which Bourne sets in the modern fashion industry. In this setting, Dorian Gray is a model for a perfume promotion rather than the wealthy socialite of the original text. A billboard poster for the advertising campaign takes the place of the eponymous portrait, whilst Gray's mentor Lord Henry is replaced by the alluring Lady Henrietta. Cyril, a male ballet dancer, replaces Sybil, the actress who catches Dorian's eye in Wilde's novel. In an interview with the Sunday Times, Bourne explained the relevance of the subject matter to a 21st-century audience: "The obsession with youth and wanting to look young has never been a bigger issue. And I’m interested in what happens to people when the camera is turned on them. People you wouldn’t look at suddenly become fascinating."

== Critical reception ==
Dorian Gray's run at the Edinburgh International Festival sold over 11,000 tickets, making it the biggest selling dance event in the festival's history. Reviewers have generally praised the imaginative choreography, costume changes and staging.

== See also ==
- Adaptations of The Picture of Dorian Gray
- Other works by Matthew Bourne
