= A Portrait of Dorian Gray =

Book of pictures

A Portrait of Dorian Gray (2005) is a book featuring fashion designer and photographer Karl Lagerfeld's visual rendition of Oscar Wilde's 1890 novel The Picture of Dorian Gray (1891), with models Larry Scott and Eva Herzigová as Mr. and Mrs. Dorian Gray. It shows photographic interpretations of parts of the novel's plot, with digitally aged portraits of Scott and Herzigova by Pierre-François Letue.

== Editions ==
- A Portrait of Dorian Gray, Steidl 2005, ISBN 3-86521-015-5

== See also ==
- Adaptations of The Picture of Dorian Gray
