= Pact with the Devil (2004 film) =

2004 film by Allan A. Goldstein

- Directed by: Allan A. Goldstein
- Written by: Ron Raley; Peter Jobin
- Produced by: Luciano Lisi; Christine Kavanagh; Charmaine Carvalho; Allan A. Goldstein; Alberto Salvatori
- Starring: Malcolm McDowell; Ethan Erickson; Christoph Waltz; Victoria Sanchez
- Release date: February 17, 2004 (U.S. video)
- Running time: 84 minutes
- Countries: Canada; United Kingdom
- Language: English

Pact with the Devil, known in Canada as Dorian, is a 2004 Canadian-British drama film directed by Allan A. Goldstein and starring Ethan Erickson, Malcolm McDowell and Christoph Waltz. It is a modern retelling of the Oscar Wilde novel The Picture of Dorian Gray. It was filmed in 2002 in Canada.

== Plot ==
In an upper side loft in Manhattan, the police are finishing up investigating what appears to be a murder-suicide with apparent Satanic undertones. Detective Giatti speaks with Henry Wooten, who knew both the victims. Henry then spins the tale of how the two first met twenty years ago.

In June 1980, Henry was managing Bea Conick, a beautiful blonde German photographer who quickly became a rising star under his guidance. While visiting at a shoot for the new Sauvage fragrance campaign, Henry notices a young man named Louis working as an assistant. Intrigued with his natural modeling capabilities and attractive physical features, Henry snaps photos of him and convinces Bea to give him a go and help jump start a potential modeling career for Louis, though Louis actually aspires to become a photographer himself. After a few shots are taken of Louis, Henry gives him a large posed portrait of Louis himself, snapped by Henry during the shoot. Henry then tells him the narrative of Dorian Gray from the Oscar Wilde novel, who made a wish – a pact with the Devil – that the beautiful portrait painted of him would age instead of the character, leaving him young and attractive forever. This leads to Louis taking on the persona of 'Dorian' for his modeling career. Louis, intrigued by the idea of being young forever like the Wilde character, then writes Dorian in his own blood in the mirror that night. During this, it is revealed that Henry is actually the Devil (as well as implied to be the same Lord Henry Wotton from the actual novel) as he senses the newly christened Dorian's actions and declares a bargain to be struck.

As Dorian becomes more and more infatuated with the pleasures and wealth of being a star, his girlfriend Sybil, a theater actress whom he is very close to and thinking of marrying, becomes distant from him. During a fight, she states that he is throwing away who he was for fame and glory. In the middle of the fight, an angry Dorian physically assaults Sybil, leading to Dorian leaving the apartment in a huff and Sybil brokenhearted and in tears. He is then seduced by an attractive woman friend of Henry's, Trina Rouch, at Henry's home. As this is happening, a despairing Sybil comes into contact with an old druggie friend, James, and he accidentally gives her a lethal dose of drugs. She dies later that night. Dorian returns to their apartment as Sybil in a body bag is being put in an ambulance, and James is being arrested. While Dorian is initially grieving the death of his first love, he quickly tosses it aside and transforms into a work of art for photographers worldwide for years to come. He succumbs to sex and drugs and all the while notices how his portrait is taking the toll for his age and the physical effects of his rough life, realizing the story of the original Dorian was true and the same thing has happened to him. He shows Henry the portrait during an argument and Henry insists that this is a good thing as he can stay young and beautiful forever and have anything he wants. As Louis begins working with Bae again on an upcoming novel published by Diana Baxter about the life of Louis – or Dorian – they form a bond. He starts to become truly happy once again as Bea spends day and night photographing him for the book. However, Bea warns him to be careful of Henry. Upon being told of Dorian's love for Bea, Henry and Dorian get into another argument in which Henry quickly reminds Dorian of his immortal physique and his true self shown in his ever deteriorating picture. As such, Dorian becomes disheartened again, once more spiraling down into a life of vice and pleasure.

In the midst of his fame and fortune, Dorian meets a married European couple, Mariella and Rolf Steiner and travels to Europe with them, taking his portrait with him. While staying in the Stiener's Bavarian mansion, Dorian and Mariella begin a passionate affair. Rolf later reveals that he knows about it and has allowed it to go on, secretly recording the two having sex. However, having grown tired of Dorian mooching off them and jealous that his wife seems to now be developing true feelings for him, Rolf demands she make him leave. Upon finding out what Rolf has done, Dorian attempts to leave with Mariella, who has grown tired of Rolf's controlling ways. Rolf confronts them with a gun and in the ensuing struggle, Dorian accidentally shoots Rolf, after which Dorian briefly sees Henry outside a window before he vanishes. Realizing what has happened, Dorian checks the painting to find it bleeding with Rolf's blood all over it. Mariella walks in distraught and upon seeing the ghastly picture, learns from Dorian that the now hideous figure in it is him. Driven mad by this and the situation, Mariella runs away but falls down the stairs after Dorian tries to stop her, killing her. An angry Dorian tries to destroy the portrait, but can't bring himself to do it as the picture seems to be alive.

Going on the run, Dorian travels around the world, indulging in every vice and sin imaginable (even being involved in a sex scandal in Bangkok, though the charges were never laid against him). Later on, about 20 years after their first meeting, he goes back to New York and visits Henry and Bea at a party Henry is throwing for her. While there, he notices everyone he used to be familiar with (Bea, Trina, Diana) have aged as they should while he still remains as youthful as ever, leaving people confused but more impressed at how he has remained so young. Louis asks Bea for all of the photos she has taken of him, keeping mum about what he plans to do with them. Upon leaving the party, he runs into James, who has cleaned up and become a photographer himself. When Dorian confronts him about killing Sybil, James reveals that Henry had come to visit her the night she died and even paid for the drugs she overdosed on. Finally coming to terms with what he has done to Sybil and who Henry truly is, Dorian goes mad, hiding away in his apartment (which he vandalizes to look like it is in the present). He destroys every picture Bea took of him and even tries to manipulate his own physical features by fire, though he is unsuccessful and the portrait only becomes more awful as a huge burn appears on it. When Bae comes and visits him on New Year's Eve, a now insane Dorian attacks her and shows her the portrait, causing a panicked Bea to accidentally reveal that she also knew who Henry was and had made a pact with him in which she would stay famous forever with her photography. Attempting to make amends for her part in Dorian's curse, Bea tries to destroy the picture herself, but Dorian (still unwilling to let go despite his knowledge) struggles with her, ultimately killing her by slashing her throat. Henry then visits upon not hearing from Bea and Dorian reveals he now knows who Henry is. Henry, after quoting Matthew 16:26 ("What profit a man, if he gains the whole world and loses his soul?") tells him that he has lived a wonderful life, drinking of every vice and sin and still looking perfect and that they will have a marvelous future together forever. Finally realizing that this madness needs to stop, Dorian gains the courage to grab a knife from Henry and stabs his portrait. However, before that, Dorian himself is accidentally fatally stabbed. As Dorian dies, he rapidly transforms into the likeness that was in the portrait with every hideous deformity of his life of vice and evil, while the portrait once more regains the youthfulness Dorian had upon its first taking.

Upon finishing his tale to Detective Giatti, the officer then looks at the crime scene photos and Dorian's fixed and perfect portrait and sees that the people in them are truly the same despite the vast differences in appearance, shocking him. Once the detective wishes Henry a happy new year and leaves, Henry mockingly toasts Dorian's picture with the same statement, hinting that Henry planned and allowed these deaths to happen in order to gain Bea and Dorian's souls. Henry then takes the portrait and is about to leave in a cab before he spots another attractive young male. Sending the cabbie to drop the picture off, Henry makes himself presentable and goes after the young man, no doubt to name him his next 'Dorian' and begin the vicious cycle all over again.

== Cast ==
- Malcolm McDowell as Henry Wooten
- Ethan Erickson as Louis / Dorian
- Christoph Waltz as Rolf Steiner
- Victoria Sanchez as Mariella Steiner
- Jennifer Nitsch as Bae Conick
- Ron Lea as Detective Giatti
- Karen Cliche as Christine
- Amy Sloan as Sybil
- Hunter Phoenix as Isabella
- Carl Alacchi as James
- Bronwen Booth as Trina Rouch
- Henri Pardo as Trina
- Luigi Tosi as cop at crime scene
- Daniela Ferrera as woman #1 at Dorian's loft
- Jane McLean as woman #2 at Dorian's loft
- Ellen David as Diana Baker

== See also ==
- Adaptations of The Picture of Dorian Gray
