= The Picture of Dorian Gray (1910 film) =

1910 film

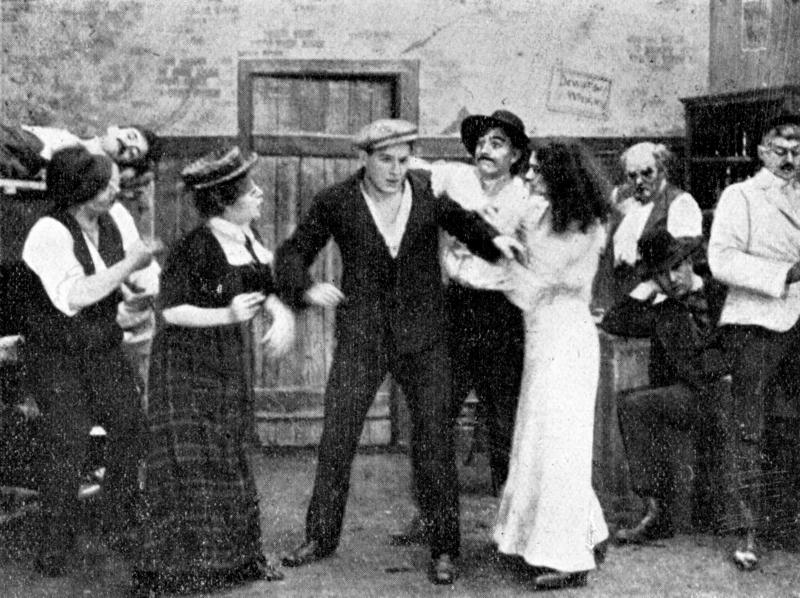
- Still from "The Picture of Dorian Gray"
- Directed by: Axel Strom
- Written by: Oscar Wilde (novel)
- Starring: Valdemar Psilander; Clara Pontoppidan; Adam Poulsen; Henrik Malberg
- Cinematography: Mads Anton Madsen
- Distributed by: Regia Kunstfilms
- Release date: 6 October 1910
- Country: Denmark
- Language: Silent

The Picture of Dorian Gray (1910), also known as Dorian Grays Portræt, is a Danish silent film based on the 1890 novel The Picture of Dorian Gray by Oscar Wilde.

== See also ==
- Adaptations of The Picture of Dorian Gray
