= Claude Cooper =

Claude Cooper may refer to:

- Claude Cooper (actor) (1880–1932), English-American character actor
- Claude Cooper (baseball) (1892–1974), outfielder in Major League Baseball
