= The Picture of Dorian Grey (1915 film) =

1915 film by Vsevolod Meyerhold

- Directed by: Vsevolod Meyerhold; Mikhail Doronin
- Written by: Vsevolod Meyerhold
- Based on: The Picture of Dorian Gray; 1891 novel by Oscar Wilde
- Starring: Varvara Yanova; Vsevolod Meyerhold; Gustav Enriton
- Cinematography: Aleksandr Levitsky
- Release date: 1915
- Running time: 22 minutes
- Country: Russian Empire
- Languages: Silent; Russian intertitles

The Picture of Dorian Grey (Russian: Портрет Дориана Грея) is a 1915 Russian silent drama film based on Oscar Wilde's 1890 novel of the same title. Directed by Vsevolod Meyerhold and Mikhail Doronin, with art direction by Vladimir Yegorov, this screen adaptation should not be confused with another film also released in 1915, one produced by the Thanhouser Company in the United States and starring actor Harris Gordon. (Note: A slight variation in the given English titles of the Russian and American films helps to differentiate the two 1915 productions in listings. The spelling of Dorian's surname is "Grey" in the Russian version; "Gray", in Thanhouser's release.) A print of Thanhouser's version is preserved in the Library of Congress, and digitized portions of that motion picture are available on YouTube and on other streaming services. No footage, however, from this Russian release is listed among the holdings of major film repositories around the world, so it is currently presumed to be lost.

== Cast ==
- Varvara Yanova as Dorian Grey
- Vsevolod Meyerhold as Lord Henry Wotton
- G. Enriton
- P. Belova
- Doronin
- Yelizaveta Uvarova
- Alexandre Volkoff

== See also ==
- Adaptations of The Picture of Dorian Gray

== Bibliography ==
- Christie, Ian & Taylor, Richard. The Film Factory: Russian and Soviet Cinema in Documents 1896-1939. Routledge, 2012.
