= The Struggle (1931 film) =

1931 film

- Theatrical release poster
- Directed by: D. W. Griffith
- Written by: John Emerson; Anita Loos; D. W. Griffith (uncredited)
- Based on: The Drunkard by Emile Zola
- Produced by: D. W. Griffith
- Starring: Hal Skelly; Zita Johann; Charles Richman; Helen Mack
- Cinematography: Joseph Ruttenberg
- Edited by: Barney Rogan
- Music by: D.W. Griffith (uncredited); Philip A. Scheib (uncredited)
- Distributed by: United Artists
- Release date: December 10, 1931
- Running time: 77 minutes
- Country: United States
- Language: English
- Budget: $300,000
- Box office: less than $100,000

The Struggle is a 1931 American pre-Code feature film directed by D. W. Griffith (his last film) based on the 1877 novel L'Assommoir by Émile Zola. It was Griffith's only full-sound film besides Abraham Lincoln (1930). After several films directed by Griffith failed at the box office, The Struggle was his last film. The film was made primarily at the Audio-Cinema studios in the Bronx, New York with some outdoor filming on the streets of the Bronx.

The Struggle stars Hal Skelly, Zita Johann, Charles Richman, and in her film debut, Helen Mack. Longtime Griffith actress Kate Bruce made her final film appearance in this film as Granny, and this was also the final film for Claude Cooper.

== Plot ==
The story begins in 1911 and extends into the Prohibition era. Jimmie got into the habit of drinking (bootleg liquor) partly due to the Prohibition law. When he falls in love with and proposes to Florrie, he makes a vow "not to take another drink". The young couple gets married, has a daughter and enjoys a happy family life until Jimmie starts drinking again due to circumstances. As Jimmie descends into alcoholism, his family falls into disarray. His sister Nan is forced to break off engagement with Johnny due to Jimmie's alcohol-fueled bad behavior. Finally, Florrie manages to save the family and nurtures Jimmie back to his feet. Nan and Johnny are reunited.

== Cast ==
- Hal Skelly as Jimmie Wilson
- Zita Johann as Florrie
- Charlotte Wynters as Nina
- Evelyn Baldwin as Nan Wilson
- Jackson Halliday as Johnnie Marshall
- Edna Hagan as Mary
- Claude Cooper as Sam
- Arthur Lipson as Cohen
- Charles Richman as Mr. Craig
- Helen Mack as a catty girl
- Scott Moore as a gigolo
- Dave Manley as a mill worker
- Kate Bruce as Granny (uncredited)
- Tammany Young as barfly (uncredited)

== Production ==
The film was inspired in part by Griffith's own battles with alcoholism. He partly funded it with a 1929 tax refund that had been invested in stocks that did well despite the Depression. Shooting took place from July to August 1931.

== Release ==
The film received poor reviews and was not a success at the box office. In 1935 United Artists considered re-releasing the film but could not get a Code Seal from the Breen Office unless cuts were made, so decided not to do it. In 1940 another distributor B.A. Mills considered re-releasing it under the title Ten Nights in a Barroom but encountered similar difficulties. Griffith never made another movie although he did marry an actress from the film, Evelyn Baldwin.

The film's copyright was renewed in 1959, so it will not fall into the public domain until January 1, 2027.
