= Mátyás Várkonyi =

- Born: September 4, 1950 (age 74); Budapest, Hungary
- Occupation: Music composer

Mátyás Várkonyi (born September 4, 1950) is a Hungarian musician. He finished his studies in the academy of Béla Bartók.

He was a founding member of the band Generál in 1971. By 1975 General became renowned all over Europe and was voted "Band of the year" in Hungary. All their albums were distributed across Europe. It was the first East European band to top charts in Western Europe – e.g. in the Netherlands with the song "Everybody Join Us" single in 1975.

In 1980 he was one of the founders of the Rock Theatre, Hungary's first musical theatre later became its musical director and director of the theatre. In 1986 he won the Ferenc Erkel prize. Awards: Wolves, won first prize for best music and best choreography in Helsinki International Music Festival in 1983. Other plays like the Starmakers, Stars of Eger (Egri Csillagok), Dorian Gray and The puppet show man were huge successes both in the Hungarian and the foreign stages.

== Shows ==
- Örvényben, 1981, musical
- Starmakers, 1981, the first Hungarian Rock opera
- Wolves, 1982, "rock fantasy"
- The puppet show man, 1985, musical
- Félőlény 1989, children's musical
- Dorian Gray 1990, musical
- Rock-Odüsszeia 1994
- Eclipse of the Crescent Moon (Egri Csillagok), 1996, musical
- Will Shakespeare or who you will, 1997, musical
- Mata Hari 2002, musical
- Ifipark 2003, musical
