= Ethan Erickson =

American actor and television host (born 1973)

- Born: Ethan Skip Erickson; August 5, 1973 (age 52); Minneapolis, Minnesota, U.S.
- Occupations: Actor, model
- Years active: 1995–2015

Ethan Skip Erickson (born August 5, 1973) is an American television and film actor and TV host.

== Education ==
Erickson was born in Minneapolis, Minnesota. He has a degree in English literature from UC Santa Barbara.

== Career ==
Erickson once played the recurring role in Buffy the Vampire Slayer as jock Percy West, who actress Alyson Hannigan's character Willow Rosenberg tutors. He appeared in both season 3 and season 4 as the same character. As a gymnast since age 8, Erickson reportedly won the part after impressing director/creator Joss Whedon with a backflip during his audition. He starred in Jawbreaker (1999) with Rose McGowan and Julie Benz, as well as The In Crowd, and played as A.J. Chamberlain on Guiding Light.

In 2006, he hosted a short-lived series on UPN called Get This Party Started with Kristin Cavallari of Laguna Beach fame. That same year, he starred in Fashion House on MyNetworkTV as scheming senior designer and blackmailer John Cotter which aired in 2006 in the U.S.

In April 2008, he briefly stepped into the role of Dr. Patrick Drake on the ABC Daytime soap opera General Hospital, while actor Jason Thompson had to take a medical leave of absence.

In the fall of that same year, his role on CSI: NY as firefighter Brendon Walsh, boyfriend to Detective Stella Bonasera (Melina Kanakaredes), was upgraded to recurring. In December 2008, he played a doctor again on an episode of The Starter Wife. In January 2009, Erickson guest-starred on Monk as star quarterback David Gitelson. In May 2009, he was reportedly cast as Britney Spears' love interest in her video "Radar". Two months later, both Erickson and Spears were seen in an ad for Candie's, a young women's fashion line.

Later that year, Erickson was cast in the 2009 Melrose Place sequel, where he had a recurring role as executive chef and co-owner Marcello, in the restaurant where both Violet (Ashlee Simpson) and Auggie (Colin Egglesfield) work. In addition, he was also the host and narrator of Chefs vs. City on Food Network for years 2009 and 2010.

In 2010, Erickson worked on the hit ABC drama Castle opposite Stana Katic and Nathan Fillion. Later that same year, he guest-starred on the TNT network's show The Closer with actress Kyra Sedgwick.

Erickson played the lead role of character Eddie Avedon opposite Jennie Garth, Fred Willard, Zack Ward and Marilu Henner in a movie of the week for Hallmark Entertainment entitled Accidentally in Love, released in 2011. In the romantic comedy, co-written by Garth's former husband and Twilight actor Peter Facinelli, Erickson portrays a struggling, jaded actor who secretly plays a costumed character on a children's TV show. His outlook on life begins to transform as he realizes his work and life have a bigger meaning when he falls for the mother of a fan of his show. In 2011, Erickson worked with Anne Heche and Eriq LaSalle on the mini-series Blackout.

== Filmography ==
=== Film ===
Year	Title	Role	Notes
1995	Two Bits & Pepper	Boyfriend	Supporting
1999	Jawbreaker	Dane Sanders	Supporting
2000	Scream 3	Detective #2	Uncredited
2000	Fear Runs Silent	Tim	Direct-to-DVD release
2000	The In Crowd	Tom	Supporting
2003	Pact with the Devil	Louis / Dorian	Starring
2013	John Dies at the End	Sergeant McElroy	Supporting

=== Television ===
Year	Title	Role	Notes
1995	Step by Step	Bobby	Episode: "The Wall"
1996–1997	Guiding Light	J. Chamberlain	10 episodes
1999–2000	Buffy the Vampire Slayer	Percy West	5 episodes
2002	Glory Days	William	Episode: "Death, Lies and Videotape"
2003	Friends	Dirk	Episode: "The One with the Soap Opera Party"
2004	Joey	Sam Baxter	Episode: "Pilot"
2006	Falling in Love with the Girl Next Door	Shawn	TV movie
2006	CSI: Crime Scene Investigation	Jake	Episode: "Time of Your Death"
2006	CSI: Miami	Sgt. Reynolds	Episode: "Come As You Are"
2006	Fashion House	John Cotter	25 episodes
2008	General Hospital	Dr. Patrick Drake	4 episodes
2008	The Starter Wife	Dr. Kassoy	Episode: "Look Who's Stalking"
2008–2009	CSI: NY	Brendon Walsh	2 episodes
2009	Monk	David Gitelson	Episode: "Mr. Monk Makes the Playoffs"
2009–2010	Melrose Place	Marcello	4 episodes
2010	Castle	Xander Doyle	Episode: "A Deadly Affair"
2010	The Closer	Lou Wilson	Episode: "High Crimes"
2011	Accidentally in Love	Eddie Avedon	Hallmark Channel Original Movie
2012	Blackout	Officer Thompson	Episode: "Part 1"
2012	I Married Who? aka: Always a Bride	Matt Swift	TV movie
2013	Santa Switch	Dan Ryebeck	TV movie
2014	Anger Management	Quinn	Episode: "Charlie Does Times With the Hot Warden"
2015	Stalked by My Neighbor	Ted Wilcox	Lifetime movie
