= The Picture of Dorian Gray (1917 German film) =

1917 film directed by Richard Oswald

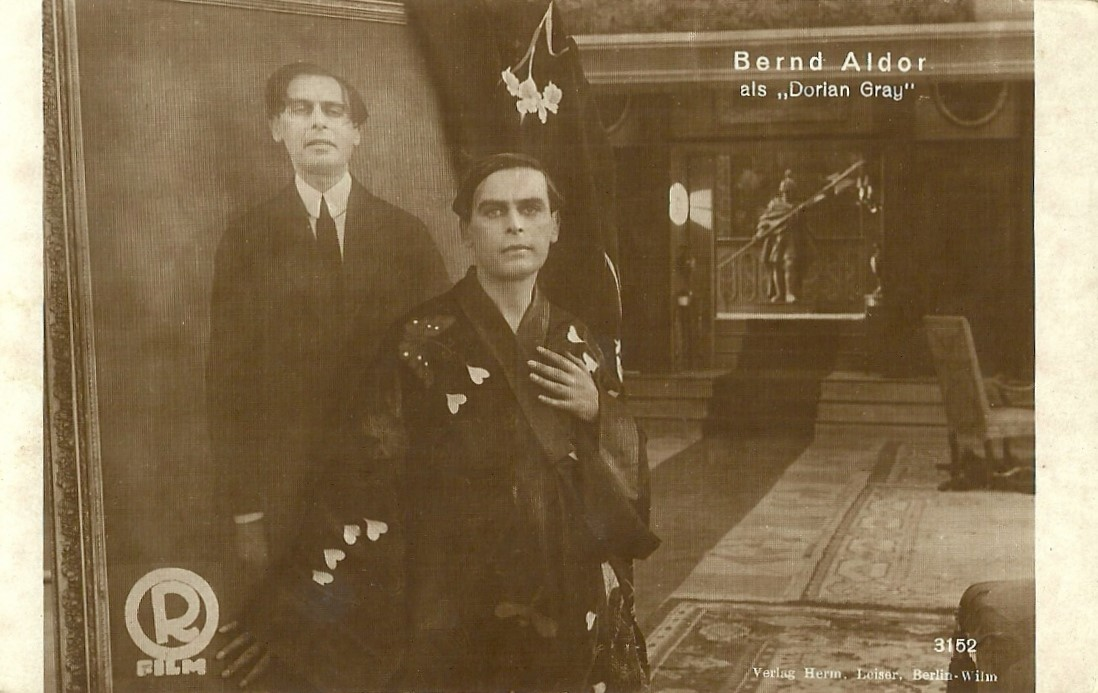
- Postcard showing Bernd Aldor as Dorian Gray
- Directed by: Richard Oswald
- Written by: Richard Oswald
- Based on: The Picture of Dorian Gray by Oscar Wilde
- Produced by: Richard Oswald
- Starring: Bernd Aldor; Ernst Pittschau
- Cinematography: Max Fassbender
- Production company: Richard-Oswald-Produktion
- Release date: July 1917
- Running time: 80 minutes
- Country: Germany
- Language: Silent

The Picture of Dorian Gray (German: Das Bildnis des Dorian Gray) is a 1917 German silent fantasy film directed by Richard Oswald and starring Bernd Aldor, Ernst Pittschau, and Ernst Ludwig. The film is based on the 1890 novel The Picture of Dorian Gray by Oscar Wilde.

== Cast ==
- Bernd Aldor as Dorian Gray
- Ernst Pittschau as Sir Henry Wotton
- Ernst Ludwig as Basil Hallward, painter
- Andreas Van Horn as Alan Campbell, pharmacist
- Lea Lara as Sibyl Vane
- Sophie Pagay as Dorian's mother
- Arthur Wellin as James Vane, Sibyl's brother
- Lupu Pick as Dorian's valet

== Reception ==
The film received a positive review in the German film magazine Der Kinematograph, specifically praising Oswald's skill as a director, and Aldor's performance in the lead role.

== See also ==
- Adaptations of The Picture of Dorian Gray

== Bibliography ==
- Kohl, Norbert. Oscar Wilde: The Works of a Conformist Rebel. Cambridge University Press, 1989.
