= Claude Cooper (actor) =

English-American actor

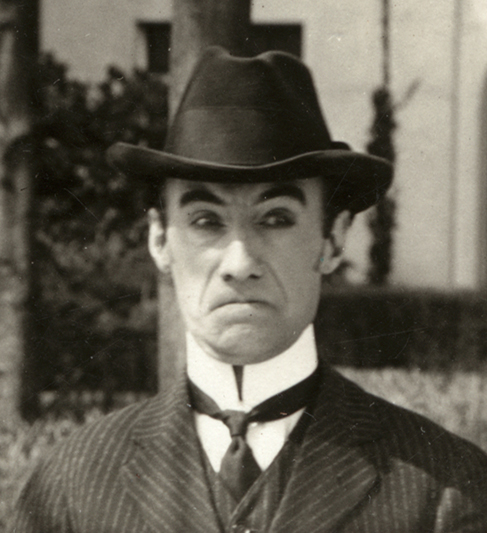
- Still from Daughter of Kings, 1915
- Born: Claude Hamilton Cooper; September 4, 1880; London, England
- Died: July 20, 1932 (aged 51); Laurelton, New York, US
- Occupations: actor, comedian
- Years active: 1889–1931
- Spouse: Antoinette Cooper

Claude Hamilton Cooper (September 4, 1880 – July 20, 1932) was an English-American character actor on stage, motion pictures, and radio.

== Biography ==
Cooper was born to a stage manager father and an actress mother in London, England, in 1880. It is said he first appeared upon the stage in the arms of his mother, Mary Stafford Cooper, at the age of eighteen months when the comic opera Castle Grim was performed in Dublin. His family moved to the United States when he was eight, and he soon appeared on the American stage in the melodrama Silver King in 1889. Cooper was active in American stock and repertoire theater with Russ Whytal, Frederick Freeman Proctor, and Charles Dillingham's companies. By the time of his death, he had played 538 character and comedic roles on Broadway. His first big success was in 1903 as the General in Checkers, which ran for three seasons on Broadway and then toured widely.

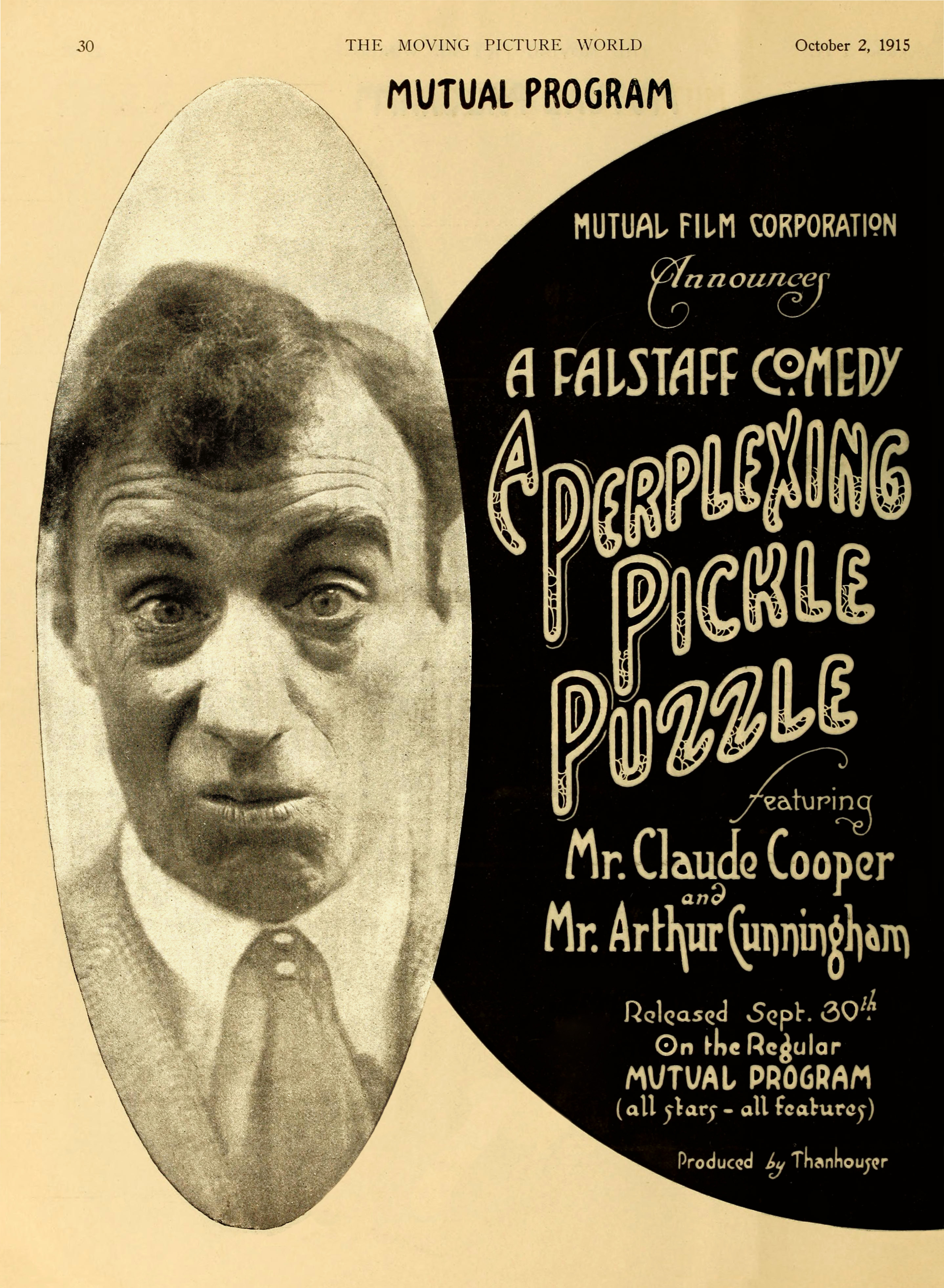
Cooper in a full-page advertisement in Moving Picture World for A Perplexing Pickle Puzzle, 1915

Cooper's motion picture career began around 1908 when he helped make Chronophone synchronized sound films for Gaumont which had established a studio in Flushing, New York, recording short songs and vaudeville routines. This early form of sound film was not successful in the United States, in part due to Thomas Edison's obstruction, and Gaumont abandoned American production in 1910. The Flushing studio then became the home of Solax Studios, a newly established silent film production company that hired former Gaumont employees including Claude Cooper who directed Solax's first twelve productions. Cooper appeared in silent films from a variety of East Coast companies, including the All Star Film Corporation, the Famous Players Film Company, the Reliance Film Company, and the Kinemacolor Company of America. However, his longest association was with the Thanhouser Film Corporation of New Rochelle, New York, for whom he worked, usually as an actor but sometimes as a director, from 1914 to 1917. For example, Cooper appeared in Thanhouser's The Picture of Dorian Gray (1915). Also at Thanhouser, he and Frank E. McNish were teamed together as the comedy duo "Oscar and Conrad."

In the 1920s Cooper was a busy character actor in New York theaters. Without fail each year from 1917 until his death in 1932, he appeared on Broadway in character roles (such as chauffeurs, drunkards, mayors, sheriffs, yokels). In 1930 he became a radio actor, playing Pegleg Gladdis the patriarch of a hillbilly family in the half-hour serial drama Moonshine and Honeysuckle broadcast on the NBC Red network on Sunday afternoons.

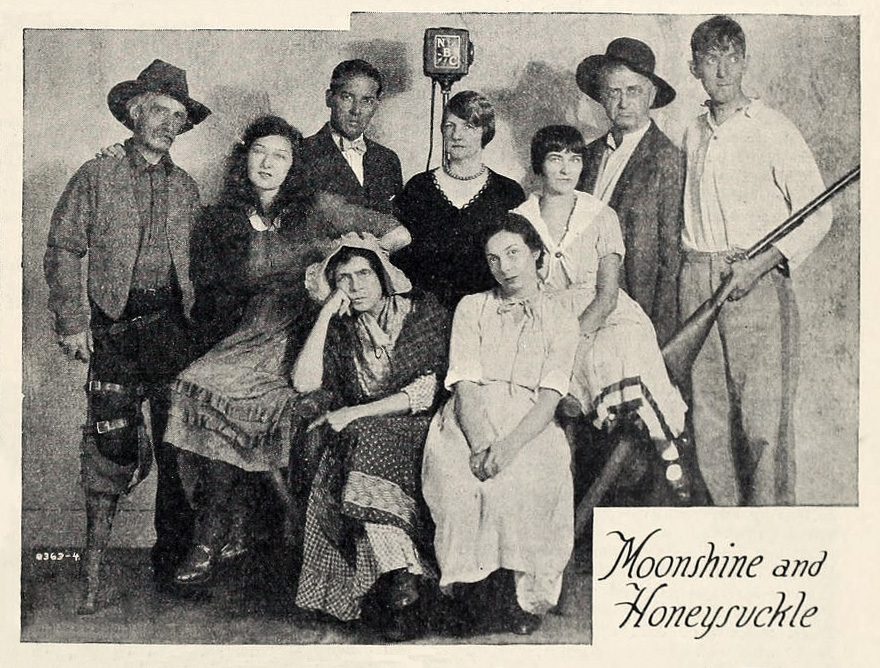
Cast of the NBC radio series Moonshine and Honeysuckle, 1931. Left to right: (standing) Cooper, Ann Elstner, Gerald Stopp (production manager), Lula Vollmer, Jeannie Begg, John Milton, Louis Mason; (seated) Ann Sutherland and Sara Haden.

Cooper's final motion picture appearance was in 1932 in D. W. Griffith's last film, The Struggle.

== Partial filmography ==
- The Nightingale (1914)
- The Country Girl (1915)
- The Garden of Lies (1915)
- The Picture of Dorian Gray (1915)
- The Woman in White (1917)
- My Own United States (1918)
- A Heart to Let (1921)
- Daughters of the Night (1924)
- The Struggle (1931)
