= The Picture of Dorian Gray (1913 film) =

- Directed by: Phillips Smalley
- Screenplay by: Lois Weber
- Based on: The Picture of Dorian Gray; 1890 novel by Oscar Wilde
- Starring: Wallace Reid; Lois Weber; Phillips Smalley
- Production company: New York Motion Picture Co.
- Release date: March 17, 1913
- Running time: 16 minutes
- Country: United States
- Language: Silent

The Picture of Dorian Gray (1913) is an American silent film, directed by Phillips Smalley, starring Wallace Reid, and with a screenplay by Lois Weber based on the novel The Picture of Dorian Gray (1890) by Oscar Wilde.

== Cast ==
- Wallace Reid as Dorian Gray
- Lois Weber
- Phillips Smalley

== See also ==
- Adaptations of The Picture of Dorian Gray
