= Dorian Gray (British singer) =

English pop singer

- Born: Tony Ellingham; 15 June 1942 (age 84); Gravesend, Kent, England, UK
- Origin: United Kingdom
- Genre: Pop music
- Occupation: Singer
- Years active: Since 1960
- Labels: EMI, Sony
- Website: unitfive.co.uk/www.5inthebar.co.uk

Dorian Gray is the stage name of Tony Ellingham, an English pop singer who had a UK Top 40 hit with "I've Got You on My Mind" in 1968.

== Early life and education ==
Sang first with popular Gravesend band 'The Casuals', educated at St Georges School Gravesend Kent. He was born in Gravesend, Kent. He began his musical career as a vocalist with local bands in Gravesend.

== Career ==
After leaving the music industry for a while, he started the band Unit Five in 1974.

"I've Got You on My Mind" has appeared on compilation albums, including BBC Sounds of the 60's (November 2011) and Honey Honey (August 2013); both albums made the top ten in the compilation charts.

As well as Unit Five, Gray formed another band "5 in the bar" playing jazz and swing, launched in September 2013.

== See also ==
- Lists of musicians
- List of people from Kent
- British pop music
