= Dorian Gray (2009 film) =

- British promotional poster
- Directed by: Oliver Parker
- Screenplay by: Toby Finlay
- Based on: The Picture of Dorian Gray by Oscar Wilde
- Produced by: Barnaby Thompson
- Starring: Ben Barnes; Colin Firth; Rebecca Hall; Ben Chaplin; Emilia Fox; Rachel Hurd-Wood
- Cinematography: Roger Pratt
- Edited by: Guy Bensley
- Music by: Charlie Mole
- Production companies: Alliance Films; UK Film Council; Ealing Studios; Fragile Films; Aramid Entertainment; Prescience Film Partnerships
- Distributed by: Momentum Pictures (United Kingdom); Alliance Films (Canada); National Entertainment Media (North America)
- Release date: 9 September 2009 (United Kingdom)
- Running time: 112 minutes
- Country: United Kingdom
- Language: English
- Box office: $22.9 million

Dorian Gray is a 2009 British dark fantasy horror film based on Oscar Wilde's 1890 novel The Picture of Dorian Gray. The film was directed by Oliver Parker, and the screenplay was written by Toby Finlay. Dorian Gray stars Ben Barnes, Colin Firth, Rebecca Hall, Ben Chaplin, Emilia Fox, and Rachel Hurd-Wood. It tells the story of the titular character; an attractive Englishman whose loveliness and spirit are captured in a painting that keeps him from aging. While he remains young and handsome, his portrait becomes tainted with every sin he commits.

Dorian Gray was released in the United Kingdom on 9 September 2009, by Momentum Pictures, having competed in the Official Fantàstic Competition at the 2009 Sitges Film Festival.

== Plot ==
When a naïve young Dorian Gray arrives in Victorian London to inherit an estate left to him by his abusive grandfather, he is swept into a social whirlwind by the charismatic Lord Henry "Harry" Wotton, who introduces Gray to the hedonistic pleasures of the city. Henry's friend, society artist Basil Hallward, paints a portrait of Gray to capture his beauty. Upon viewing the portrait, Gray makes a flippant pledge; he would give anything to stay young—even his soul.

Gray falls in love with budding young actress Sibyl Vane and proposes marriage. However, influenced by Henry and after a brothel visit, Gray leaves Sibyl. Heartbroken, the young woman drowns herself. Her brother, Jim, confronts Dorian and reveals Sibyl was pregnant with Gray's child. Jim attempts to strangle Gray before being dragged away. Henry distracts Gray from his grief, and his hedonistic lifestyle worsens, distancing him from Basil.

Gray finds Basil's portrait of him has become warped and twisted and realises that his off-hand pledge has come true; while he stays healthy and whole, his sins and injuries manifest as physical defects on the canvas. When Basil repeatedly insists on seeing the portrait (which Gray had locked away in the attic), Gray reveals it to him and then kills him. Gray dismembers and dumps Basil's body in the River Thames, but the remains are recovered and buried.

Gray invites Henry to travel the world but the latter declines, citing his wife's pregnancy. After a 25-year absence, Gray returns to London. He stuns everyone at the welcoming party with his unchanged youthful appearance. Much to her father's disapproval, Henry's daughter Emily becomes fascinated with Gray.

Gray's memory of Sibyl resurfaces, making him remorseful. He attempts to distance himself from Emily but he cannot resist her. Jim Vane stalks and confronts Gray, only to be killed by an oncoming train in the London Underground. While Gray prepares to leave London with Emily for America, Henry studies old photographs and remembers Gray's off-handed pledge to exchange his soul for eternal youth.

Henry obtains a copy of Dorian's attic key. In the attic, he discovers Basil's blood-stained scarf. Gray confronts and attempts to strangle Henry but gets distracted by Emily calling to him. Henry knocks him aside and exposes the portrait. Horrified at the twisted sight on the canvas, Henry sets it on fire and locks Gray in the attic. Emily reaches the attic but Gray refuses to leave. He confesses his love for her, and Henry drags her out of the burning mansion. Gray impales the painting with a fire poker, causing his body to age rapidly before he and the entire mansion are consumed by fire.

A few months later, following a futile attempt to reconcile with Emily, Henry heads to his attic. He looks at the portrait of Gray, which has returned to its original state despite its burned and charred frame. The portrait's eyes briefly glow.

== Cast ==
- Ben Barnes as Dorian Gray
- Colin Firth as Lord Henry Wotton
- Ben Chaplin as Basil Hallward
- Rachel Hurd-Wood as Sibyl Vane
- Johnny Harris as Jim Vane
- Rebecca Hall as Emily Wotton
- Emilia Fox as Lady Victoria Wotton
- Fiona Shaw as Agatha
- Maryam d'Abo as Gladys
- Caroline Goodall as Lady Radley
- Michael Culkin as Lord Radley

Supporting parts are played by Pip Torrens as Victor, Gray's valet; Jo Woodcock as Lord and Lady Radley's daughter Celia; Max Irons as Lucius, a young man whom Gray assaults at a party for touching the key to the attic door; David Sterne as the theatre manager who first introduces Gray to Sibyl; and Douglas Henshall as Alan Campbell, an acquaintance of Gray's who is present when Jim Vane tries to strangle Gray.

== Production ==
The film began shooting in summer 2008 at Ealing Studios and locations across London. The film received £500,000 of National Lottery funding via the UK Film Council's Premiere Fund.

=== Directorial intent ===
Oliver states that he knew he would need to deviate from the novel in order to create an effective film. He spoke with Barnes about changing the story to create a climax in the third act of the film and the addition of Lord Henry's daughter. Parker understood that he would be in conflict with purists of the novel, but felt he needed to make these changes in order to not do a disservice the original.

== Reception ==
The film received mixed reviews. As of February 2024, the film holds an approval rating of 43% on film review aggregator website Rotten Tomatoes, based on 40 reviews with an average rating of 5/10. The site's critical consensus states: "Despite a lavish and polished production, Dorian Gray is tame and uninspired with a lifeless performance by Ben Barnes in the title role."

== Technical aspects and narrative changes ==
=== The portrait ===
Many technical aspects and narrative changes of the film centre around Hallward's elaborate, youthful portrait of Gray. The picture, once completed, transcends its role as a material object. It changes over time and it is capable of influencing Gray's actions. The cinematographic tools of specific camera angles and sound, along with narrative changes, were employed to amplify the picture's liveliness.

When the portrait immediately displayed and praised by the high society, it is placed high in an open area of Gray's home where social gatherings are commonly-held. This placement allows the picture to observe its counterpart, Gray, and his interactions with others in society. The portrait's ability to observe is evident in the film when Gray receives the dreadful news of Sybil Vane's death. Alone in the room with the portrait, Gray feels it intently watching him. The film's viewpoint in this scene continuously shifts between the portrait's and Gray's observations of one another. The blurred gaze from the camera's panning effect belonged to the portrait, as the camera angle was taken from a higher vantage point looking down upon Gray. When the portrait's blurred perspective appears on screen, a haunting song accompanies the scene to emphasise the horrifying revelation that the portrait is alive.

Unlike lifeless objects, the portrait decomposes at a quick pace; it attracts flies and rats, and a maggot falls from its painted canvas face.

== Themes ==
=== Morality ===
Dorian Gray completely disregards traditional morality as he places beauty and pleasure over morality. His desires become noticeable in the film with many scenes of Dorian expressing sensual experiences with multiple people. He begins to understand that the portrait will bear his burden, so he becomes indifferent to the feelings and consequences of his choices; this will later cause him significant pain and suffering and therefore lead to his moral decay.

=== Narcissism ===
A subset of narcissism called grandiose narcissism is particularly prevalent in Dorian Gray. Grandiose narcissism is distinguished by specific character traits, like a sense of superiority, arrogance, and dominance, with people possessing this subset of the disorder appearing charismatic, confident, and assertive. Author Ramesh Kumar suggests that the character of Dorian Gray is a grandiose narcissist.

== See also ==
- Adaptations of The Picture of Dorian Gray
