= The Picture of Dorian Gray (Play of the Month) =

- Play of the Month episode
- Directed by: John Gorrie
- Written by: John Osborne
- Based on: The Picture of Dorian Gray by Oscar Wilde
- Original air date: 19 September 1976
- Running time: 100 minutes

"The Picture of Dorian Gray" is a television play episode of the BBC One anthology television series Play of the Month It stars Peter Firth, Jeremy Brett, and John Gielgud. A 100-minute adaptation of Oscar Wilde's 1890 novel The Picture of Dorian Gray by John Osborne, it was first broadcast on 19 September 1976.

This production was a critical success at the time of its first screening. In 2009 The Times called it the "most Wildean" adaptation of the novel, boasting "perhaps the best Dorian" and mentioning that John Gielgud "steals the show, having of course been given the most beguiling lines by Wilde".

This version accentuates the gay subtext of Wilde's novel more than other versions; e.g. when Dorian wants Alan's help in the disposal of Basil's body, it is strongly suggested that the two had a sexual relationship in the past and when Dorian's seduction attempt fails, he apparently threatens to expose Alan as a homosexual. In the novel and other adaptations the precise nature of Dorian's hold over Alan is mostly left to the imagination of the reader or viewer, respectively.

== Cast ==
- Peter Firth as Dorian Gray
- Jeremy Brett as Basil Hallward
- John Gielgud as Henry Wotton
- Judi Bowker as Sibyl Vane
- Nicholas Ball as James Vane
- Gillian Raine as Mrs Vane
- Nicholas Clay as Alan Campbell
- Michael Barrington as Mr Erskine
- Mark Dignam as Lord Fermor
- Gwen Ffrangcon-Davies as Lady Agatha

== See also ==
- Adaptations of The Picture of Dorian Gray
