= The Picture of Dorian Gray (1916 film) =

- Directed by: Fred W. Durrant
- Written by: Rowland Talbot
- Based on: The Picture of Dorian Gray; 1891 novel by Oscar Wilde
- Starring: Henry Victor; Pat O'Malley
- Production company: Barker-Neptune
- Distributed by: Browne Films
- Release date: June 1916
- Running time: 6 reels
- Country: United Kingdom
- Language: Silent

The Picture of Dorian Gray is a 1916 British silent fantasy film directed by Fred W. Durrant and starring Henry Victor, Pat O'Malley and Sydney Bland. The film is based on the 1890 novel The Picture of Dorian Gray by Oscar Wilde.

== Cast ==
- Henry Victor – Dorian Gray
- Pat O'Malley – Sibyl Vane
- Sydney Bland – Basil Hallward
- Dorothy Fane – Lady Marchmont
- Jack Jordan – Lord Henry Wootton
- Douglas Cox – James Vane
- A.B. Imeson – Satan
- Miriam Ferris
- Edmund Goulding

== See also ==
- Adaptations of The Picture of Dorian Gray

== Bibliography ==
- Kohl, Norbert. Oscar Wilde: The Works of a Conformist Rebel. Cambridge University Press, 1989.
