= Michael Raver =

American actor, journalist, model, playwright (born 20th century)

Michael Raver (born 20th century) is an American actor, journalist, model, and playwright.

== Life and career ==
He was born in New York City.

He had his stage debut in Ellen McLaughlin's adaptation of the ancient Greek tragedy The Persians at the National Actor's Theater in 2007, alongside Len Cariou, Michael Stuhlbarg and Michael Potts. He portrayed physicist Richard Feynman in the 2015 television film How We Built the Bomb.

His adaptation of Oscar Wilde's 1890 novel The Picture of Dorian Gray was presented by Sonnet Repertory Theatre in 2012, starring Sam Underwood. His original plays include Fire on Babylon, Riptide and Quiet Electricity.

Raver appeared as a model in men's underwear brand Ken Wroy's 2015 winter campaign and menswear clothier Kai D American Artisan's 2012 fall collection.

He has written articles for The Huffington Post, Playbill, Classical TV and the New York City Monthly about the performing arts, food and culture. Some of his interviewees have included KT Tunstall, Margaret Cho, Shawn Colvin, and Jewel.

He served as a judge for The Publishing Triangle's Ferro-Grumley Award for LGBT Fiction from 2014 through 2016.

== See also ==
- List of American actors
- List of American writers
- List of people from New York City
- List of playwrights
