= The Picture of Dorian Gray (2004 film) =

- Directed by: Dave Rosenbaum
- Written by: Dave Rosenbaum
- Based on: The Picture of Dorian Gray; 1891 novel by Oscar Wilde
- Produced by: Steven Gordon; Methodius Petrikov; Reyna Rosenshein
- Starring: Josh Duhamel; Branden Waugh
- Cinematography: Wojciech Todorow
- Edited by: Mark Bowen; Karl Kimbrough; Nadia Naimi
- Music by: Penka Kouneva
- Release date: 2004
- Running time: 90 minutes
- Country: United States
- Language: English

The Picture of Dorian Gray is a 2004 American film directed and written by Dave Rosenbaum and starring Josh Duhamel in his film debut.

== Plot summary ==
A man (Josh Duhamel) remains eternally young, while his portrait becomes increasingly hideous by the ravages of his depravity.

== Cast ==
- Josh Duhamel as Dorian Gray
- Branden Waugh as Harry Wotton
- Rainer Judd as Basil Ward
- Darby Stanchfield as Sibyl Vane
- Brian Durkin as James Vane
- Julie Amos as Laura Wotton
