= Axel Strøm =

Norwegian physician (1901–1985)

Axel Strøm (11 May 1901 – 18 June 1985) was a Norwegian physician. He was born in Kristiania. He was appointed Professor of Public Health at the University of Oslo from 1940. Among his works were studies on health issues among concentration camp survivors. He served as President of Den norske lægeforening from 1948 to 1951, and chaired Norges Akademikersamband from 1951 to 1955. He was decorated Commander of the Order of St. Olav in 1969.
