= The Picture of Dorian Gray (1915 film) =

1915 short film directed by Eugene Moore

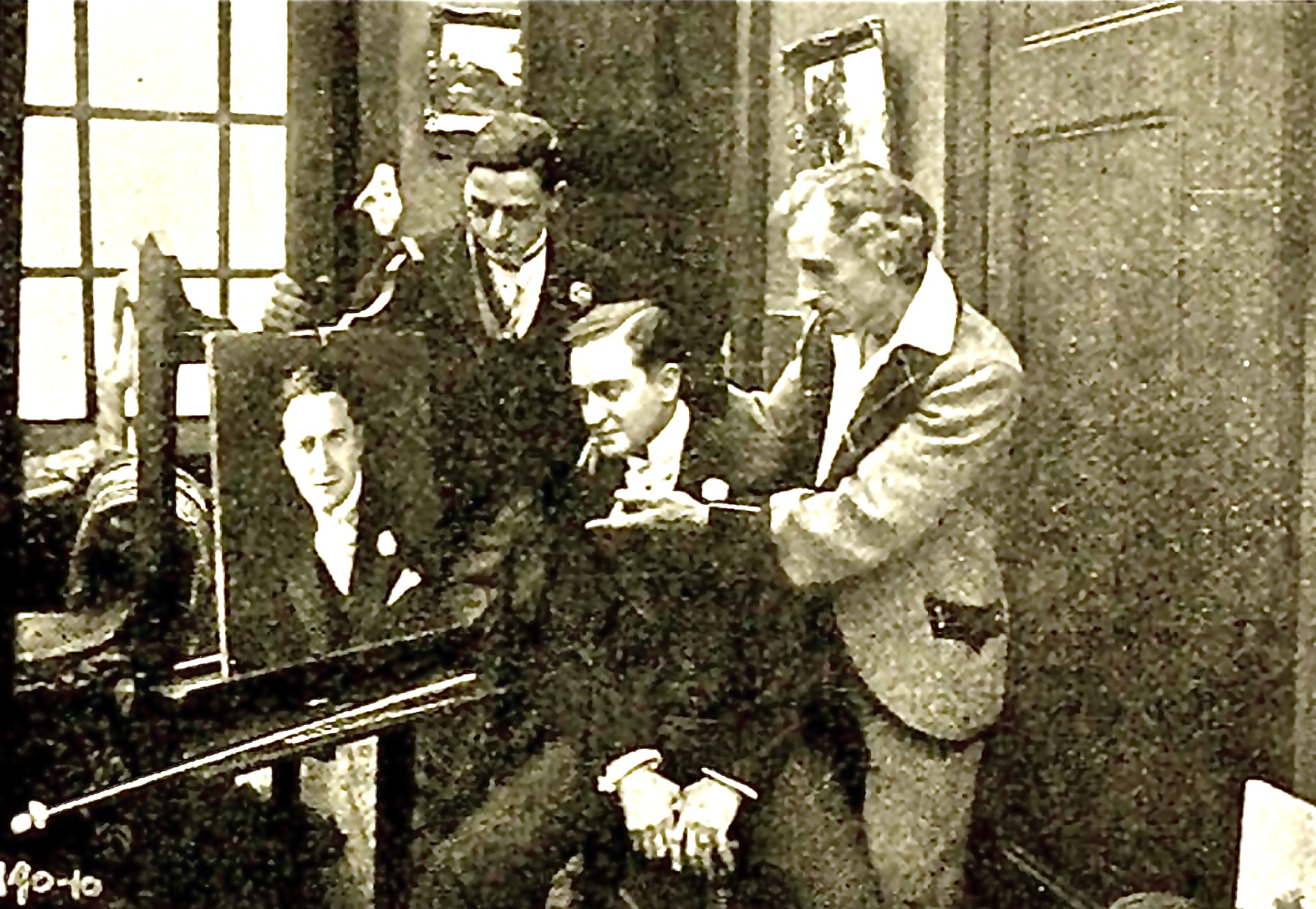
- Scene with actors (from left) W. Ray Johnston, Harris Gordon, and Ernest Howard
- Directed by: Eugene Moore
- Based on: The Picture of Dorian Gray; 1891 novel by Oscar Wilde
- Starring: Harris Gordon; Helen Fulton; Ernest Howard; W. Ray Johnston
- Production company: Thanhouser Film Corporation
- Distributed by: Mutual Film Company
- Release date: July 20, 1915
- Running time: 2 reels, 35mm 2000 feet (30 minutes)
- Country: United States
- Language: Silent with English intertitles

The Picture of Dorian Gray is a 1915 American silent film based on Oscar Wilde's novel The Picture of Dorian Gray, which was first published in its full length in July 1891. Produced by Thanhouser Company in New York, this screen adaptation stars Harris Gordon in the title role with principal supporting characters performed by Helen Fulton, W. Ray Johnston, and Ernest Howard.

A print of the film is preserved in the Library of Congress, and a substantial portion of the "two-reeler" can be viewed in digital form on the online streaming service YouTube.

The Picture of Dorian Gray (1915)

== Cast ==
- Harris Gordon as Dorian Gray
- Helen Fulton as Evelyn
- Howard Hickman as Basil Hayward
- W. Ray Johnston as Lord Henry Wotton
- Morgan Jones
- Claude Cooper
- Arthur Bauer
- N. S. Woods (N. Z. Wood)

== See also ==
- Adaptations of The Picture of Dorian Gray
