= The Picture of Dorian Gray =

1890 novel by Oscar Wilde

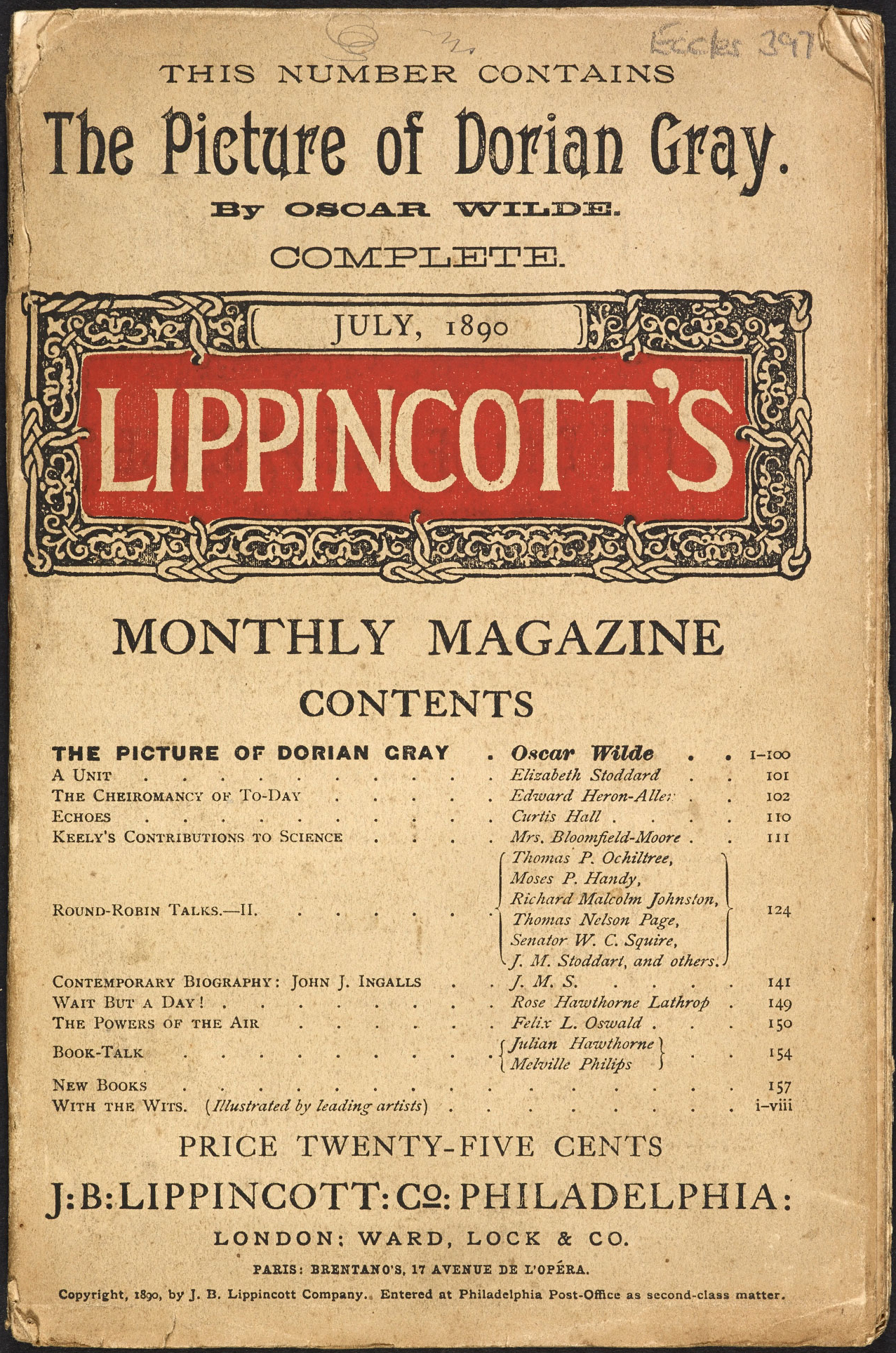
- A picture of the cover of the July 1890 edition of Lippincott's Monthly Magazine, where "The Picture of Dorian Gray" was first published
- Author: Oscar Wilde
- Language: English
- Genre: Philosophical fiction, Gothic fiction, decadent literature
- Published: July 1890 Lippincott's Monthly Magazine
- Publication place: United Kingdom
- Media type: Print
- OCLC: 53071567
- Dewey Decimal: 823.8
- LC Class: PR5819.A2
- Text: The Picture of Dorian Gray at Wikisource

The Picture of Dorian Gray is an 1890 philosophical fiction and Gothic horror novel by Irish author Oscar Wilde. A shorter novella-length version was published in the July 1890 issue of the American periodical Lippincott's Monthly Magazine, while the novel-length version was published in April 1891. As the only novel written by Wilde, it is widely regarded as a classic of both Gothic and English literature, having been adapted many times for films, stage, plays, and other forms of art performances.

The story revolves around a portrait of Dorian Gray painted by Basil Hallward, a friend of Dorian's and an artist infatuated with Dorian's beauty. Through Basil, Dorian meets Lord Henry Wotton and is soon enthralled by the aristocrat's hedonistic worldview: that beauty and sensual fulfilment are the only things worth pursuing in life. Knowing that he will lose his beauty with time, Dorian impulsively chooses to sell his soul and asks for the portrait, rather than himself, to age and fade. His wish granted, Dorian pursues a libertine life of varied immoral experiences while staying young and beautiful; all the while, his portrait ages and visually records every one of Dorian's sins.

The Picture of Dorian Gray was initially subjected to significant controversy and criticism following its publication. Largely ignored until the 1980s, it has come to be recognised as one of Wilde's best-known works, attracting critical academic and popular interest, and it remains one of the most widely read Gothic novels. The Guardian listed it among the 100 best novels ever written in English, and the book has inspired the Dorian Awards since 2009.

== Origins ==
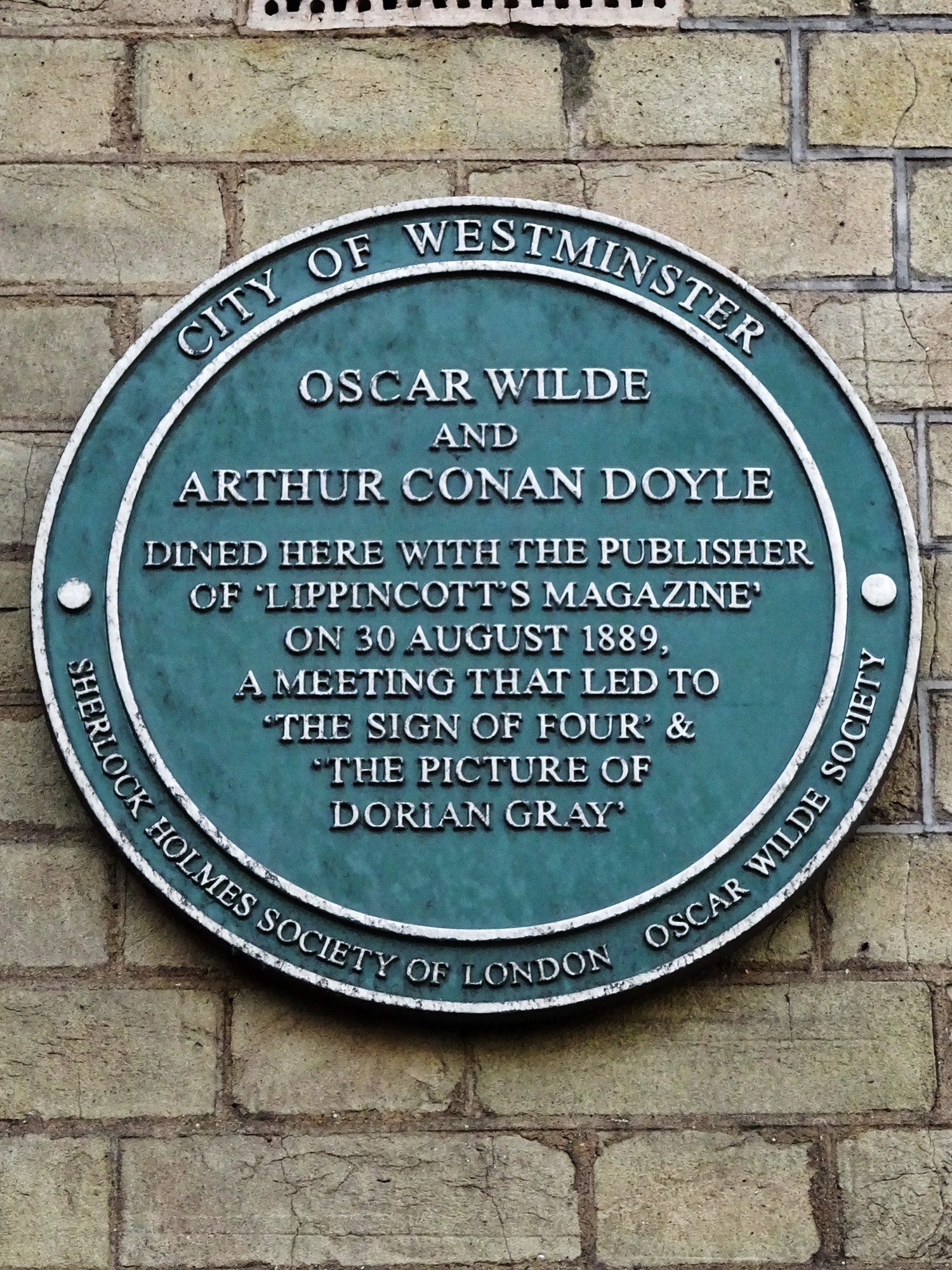
Plaque commemorating the dinner between Wilde, Doyle and the publisher on 30 August 1889 at 1 Portland Place, Regent Street, London

In 1882, Oscar Wilde met Frances Richards in Ottawa, where he visited her studios. In 1887, Richards moved to London where she renewed her acquaintance with Wilde and painted his portrait. Wilde described that incident as being the inspiration for the novel:

In December, 1887, I gave a sitting to a Canadian artist who was staying with some friends of hers and mine in South Kensington. When the sitting was over, and I had looked at the portrait, I said in jest, 'What a tragic thing it is. This portrait will never grow older and I shall. If it was only the other way!' The moment I had said this it occurred to me what a capital plot the idea would make for a story. The result is 'Dorian Gray.'

In 1889, J. M. Stoddart, an editor for Lippincott's Monthly Magazine, was in London to solicit novellas to publish in the magazine. On 30 August, Stoddart dined with Oscar Wilde, Arthur Conan Doyle and T. P. Gill at the Langham Hotel, and commissioned novellas from each writer. Doyle promptly submitted The Sign of the Four, which was published in the February 1890 edition of Lippincott's. Stoddart received Wilde's manuscript for The Picture of Dorian Gray on 7 April 1890, seven months after having commissioned the novel from him.

In July 1889, Wilde published "The Portrait of Mr. W. H.", a very different story but one that has a similar title to The Picture of Dorian Gray and has been described as "a preliminary sketch of some of its major themes", including homosexuality.

== Publication and versions ==
=== 1890 novella ===
The literary merits of The Picture of Dorian Gray impressed Stoddart, but he told the publisher, George Lippincott, "in its present condition there are a number of things an innocent woman would make an exception to." Fearing that the story was indecent, Stoddart deleted around five hundred words without Wilde's knowledge prior to publication. Among the pre-publication deletions were: (i) passages alluding to homosexuality and to homosexual desire; (ii) all references to the fictional book title Le Secret de Raoul and its author, Catulle Sarrazin; and (iii) all "mistress" references to Gray's lovers, Sibyl Vane and Hetty Merton.

It was published in full as the first 100 pages in both the American and British editions of the July 1890 issue, first printed on 20 June 1890. Later in the year the publisher of Lippincott's Monthly Magazine, Ward, Lock & Company, published a collection of complete novels from the magazine, which included Wilde's.

=== 1891 novel ===
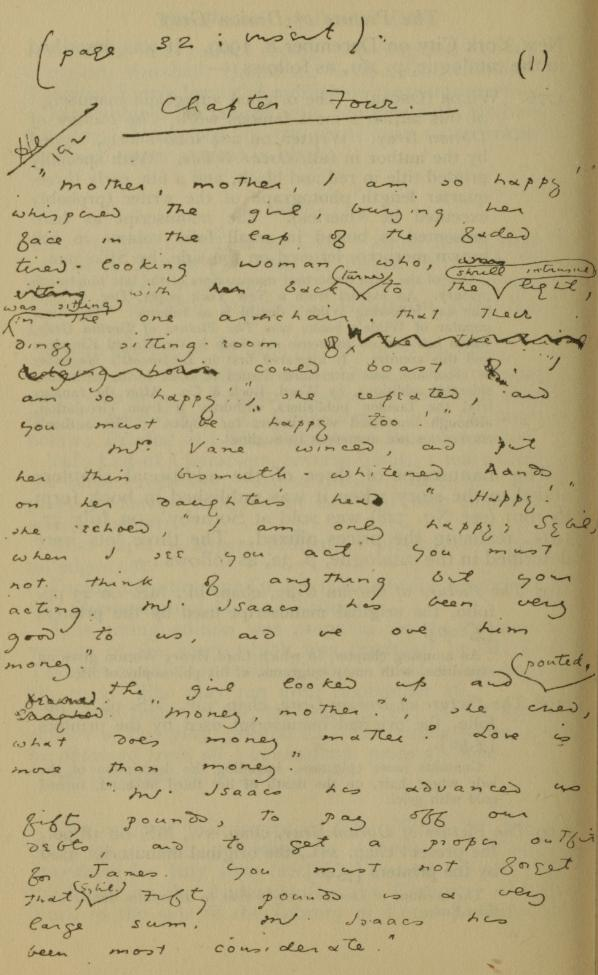
Original manuscript of one of the 1891 novel's new chapters; here labeled chapter 4, it would end up as chapter 5

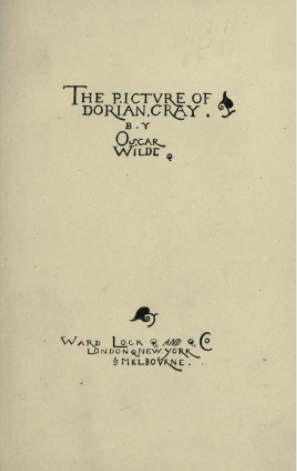
The title page of the Ward, Lock & Co 1891 edition of The Picture of Dorian Gray with decorative lettering, designed by Charles Ricketts

For the fuller 1891 novel, Wilde retained Stoddart's edits and made some of his own, expanding the text from thirteen to twenty chapters and adding the book's famous preface. Chapters 3, 5, and 15–18 are new, and chapter 13 of the magazine edition was divided into chapters 19 and 20 for the novel. Revisions include changes in character dialogue as well as the addition of the preface, more scenes and chapters, and Sibyl Vane's brother, James Vane.

The edits have been construed as having been done in response to criticism, but Wilde denied this in his 1895 trials, only ceding that critic Walter Pater, whom Wilde respected, did write several letters to him "and in consequence of what he said I did modify one passage" that was "liable to misconstruction". A number of edits involved obscuring homoerotic references, to simplify the moral message of the story. In the magazine edition (1890), Basil tells Lord Henry how he "worships" Dorian, and begs him not to "take away the one person that makes my life absolutely lovely to me." In the magazine edition, Basil focuses upon love, whereas, in the book edition (1891), he focuses upon his art, saying to Lord Henry, "the one person who gives my art whatever charm it may possess: my life as an artist depends on him."

Wilde's textual additions were about the "fleshing out of Dorian as a character" and providing details of his ancestry that made his "psychological collapse more prolonged and more convincing." The introduction of the James Vane character to the story develops the socio-economic background of the Sibyl Vane character, thus emphasising Dorian's selfishness and foreshadowing James's accurate perception of the essentially immoral character of Dorian Gray; thus, he correctly deduced Dorian's dishonourable intent towards Sibyl. The sub-plot about James Vane's dislike of Dorian gives the novel a Victorian tinge of class struggle.

In April 1891 Ward, Lock & Company published the revised version of The Picture of Dorian Gray. In the decade after Wilde's death, the authorised edition of the novel was published by Charles Carrington.

=== 2011 "uncensored" novel ===
The original typescript submitted to Lippincott's Monthly Magazine, now housed at UCLA, had been largely forgotten except by professional Wilde scholars until the 2011 publication of The Picture of Dorian Gray: An Annotated, Uncensored Edition by the Belknap Press. This edition includes the roughly 500 words of text deleted by J. M. Stoddart, the story's initial editor, prior to its publication in Lippincott's in 1890. For instance, in one scene, Basil Hallward confesses that he has worshipped Dorian Gray with a "romance of feeling", and has never loved a woman.

== Preface ==
Following the criticism of the magazine edition of the novel, Wilde wrote a preface in which he indirectly addressed the criticisms in a series of epigrams. The preface was first published in The Fortnightly Review and then, a month later, in the book version of the novel. The content, style, and presentation of the preface made it famous in its own right as a literary and artistic manifesto in support of artists' rights and art for art's sake.

To communicate how the novel should be read, Wilde used aphorisms to explain the role of the artist in society, the purpose of art, and the value of beauty. It traces Wilde's cultural exposure to Taoism and to the philosophy of Chuang Tsǔ (Zhuang Zhou). Before writing the preface, Wilde had written a book review of Herbert Giles's translation of the work of Zhuang Zhou, and in the essay "The Critic as Artist", Oscar Wilde said:

The honest ratepayer and his healthy family have no doubt often mocked at the dome-like forehead of the philosopher, and laughed over the strange perspective of the landscape that lies beneath him. If they really knew who he was, they would tremble. For Chuang Tsǔ spent his life in preaching the great creed of Inaction, and in pointing out the uselessness of all things.

== Summary ==
The story is set in London, England, during the Victorian era. Lord Henry Wotton is observing his friend, artist Basil Hallward, painting the portrait of Dorian Gray, a wealthy young man who is Basil's ultimate muse. The hedonistic Lord Henry thinks that beauty is the only aspect of life worth pursuing, prompting Dorian to wish that his portrait would age instead of himself.

Under Lord Henry's influence, Dorian fully explores his sensuality, leading to both men neglecting their friendship with Basil. Dorian discovers the actress Sibyl Vane, who performs Shakespeare plays in a dingy, working-class theatre. Admiring her talent, Dorian courts her and soon proposes marriage. The enamoured Sibyl calls him "Prince Charming". Her younger brother, James, leaves for a job at sea, but warns Sibyl that if "Prince Charming" harms her, he will murder him.

Dorian invites Basil and Lord Henry to see Sibyl perform in a production of Romeo and Juliet. Sibyl, too enamoured with Dorian to act, performs poorly, which makes Basil and Lord Henry think Dorian has fallen in love with Sibyl because of her beauty instead of her talent. Embarrassed, Dorian rejects Sibyl, saying that acting is her beauty; without that, she no longer interests him. Returning home, Dorian notices that the portrait has changed; his wish has come true, and the man in the portrait bears a subtle sneer of cruelty.

Conscience-stricken and lonely, Dorian decides to be reconciled with Sibyl, writing her a letter. However, in the morning, Lord Henry arrives and informs Dorian she has killed herself. Rationalising his cruelty, the young man decides that he has no need for love since his immortality protects him from any consequence. He hides the portrait away, and for eighteen years he experiments with every vice, influenced by a morally poisonous French novel that Lord Henry has given him.

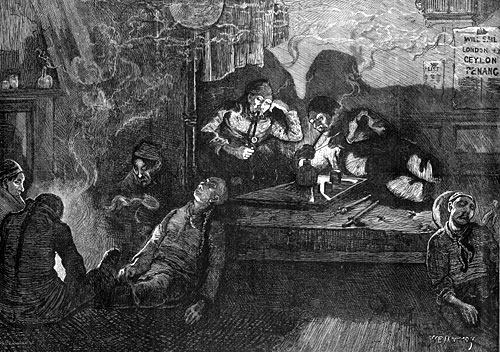
A 19th-century London opium den (based on fictional accounts of the day)

One night, before leaving for Paris, Basil goes to Dorian's house to ask him about rumours of his self-indulgent sensualism. Dorian does not deny his debauchery and takes Basil to see the portrait, which has become so hideous that Basil can only identify it as his by the signature on it. Horrified, Basil beseeches Dorian to pray for salvation; angered by Basil's reaction, Dorian stabs him to death. He then blackmails an old friend, scientist Alan Campbell, into using his knowledge of chemistry to destroy Basil's body. Alan later kills himself.

To escape the guilt of his crime, Dorian goes to an opium den, where, unbeknownst to him, an older James Vane is present. James has been seeking vengeance upon Dorian ever since Sibyl's death but has had no leads to pursue as the only thing he knew about Dorian was the nickname she called him. There, however, he hears someone refer to Dorian as "Prince Charming". James accosts Dorian, who deceives him into believing he is too young to have known Sibyl, as his face is still that of a young man. James relents and releases Dorian but is then approached by a woman from the den who reproaches James for not killing Dorian. She confirms Dorian's identity and explains that he has not aged in eighteen years.

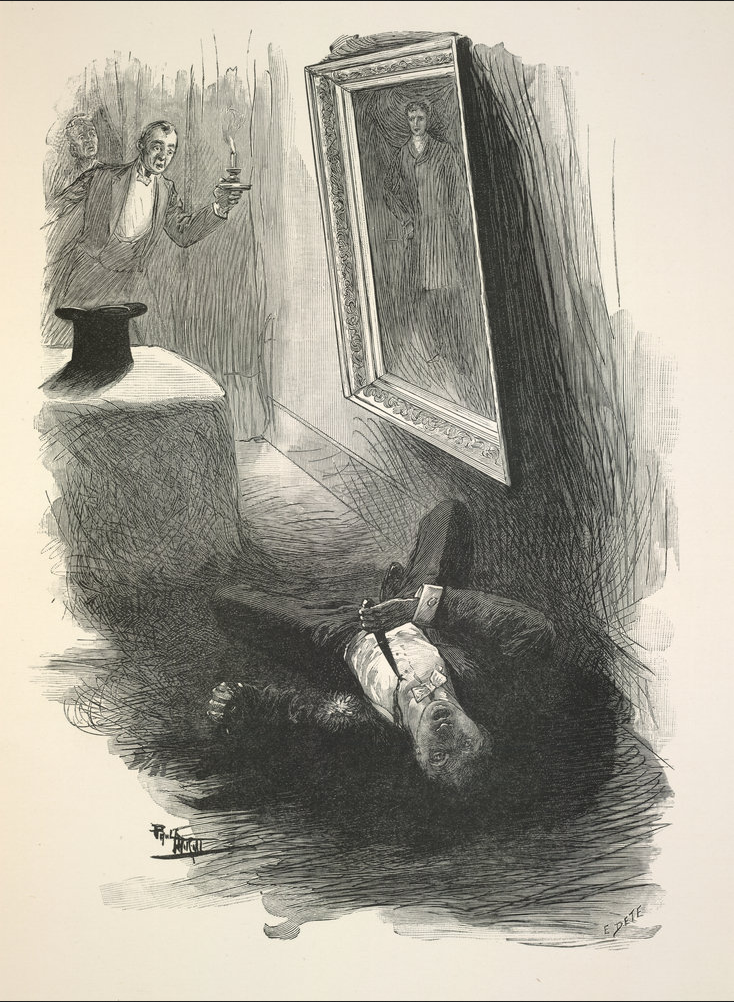
The death of Dorian Gray (Eugène Dété, after Paul Thiriat)

James begins to stalk Dorian, who starts to fear for his life. During a shooting party, a hunter accidentally kills James, who was lurking in a thicket. On returning to London, Dorian tells the elderly Lord Henry that he will live righteously from now on. His new probity begins with deliberately not going through with his plan to run away with Hetty Merton, a young girl who is in love with him. Dorian wonders if his newfound goodness has rescinded the corruption in the picture, but when he looks at it he sees an even uglier image of himself. From that, Dorian understands that he can never be truly redeemed as he only wishes to be absolved of his sins, without truly believing that what he has done is wrong. Deciding that only a full confession will suffice, Dorian finds the knife with which he murdered Basil and stabs the picture in a bout of fury.

His servants awaken on hearing a cry from the locked room; on the street, a passerby also hears it and calls the police. On entering the locked room, the servants find an old man stabbed in the heart, his figure withered and decrepit. They identify the corpse as Dorian only by the rings on the fingers, while the portrait beside him is beautiful again.

== Characters ==
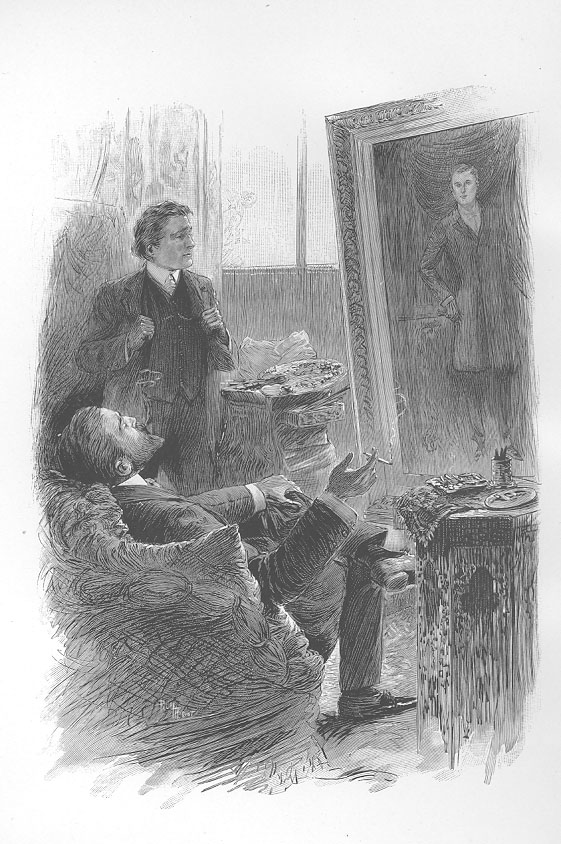
The painter Basil Hallward and the aristocrat Lord Henry Wotton observe the picture of Dorian Gray.

- Dorian Gray – a handsome, selfish young man enthralled by Lord Henry's hedonism. He indulges in every pleasure and virtually every sin, studying its effect upon him.
- Basil Hallward – a deeply moral man, the painter of the portrait, and infatuated with Dorian, whose patronage realises his potential as an artist. The picture of Dorian Gray is Basil's masterpiece.
- Lord Henry "Harry" Wotton – an imperious aristocrat and a decadent dandy who espouses a philosophy of self-indulgent hedonism. Initially Basil's friend, he neglects him for Dorian's beauty. The character of witty Lord Harry is a critique of Victorian culture at the Fin de siècle – of Britain at the end of the 19th century. Lord Harry's libertine world view corrupts Dorian, who then successfully emulates him. To the aristocrat Harry, the observant artist Basil says, "You never say a moral thing, and you never do a wrong thing." Lord Henry takes pleasure in impressing, influencing, and even misleading his acquaintances (to which purpose he bends his considerable wit and eloquence) but appears not to observe his own hedonistic advice, preferring to study himself with scientific detachment. His distinguishing feature is total indifference to the consequences of his actions.
- Sibyl Vane – a talented actress and singer, she is a beautiful girl from a poor family with whom Dorian falls in love. Her love for Dorian ruins her acting ability, because she no longer finds pleasure in portraying fictional love as she is now experiencing real love in her life. She commits suicide with poison on learning that Dorian no longer loves her; at that, Lord Henry likens her to Ophelia in Hamlet.
- James Vane – Sibyl's younger brother, a sailor who leaves for Australia. He is very protective of his sister, especially as their mother cares only for Dorian's money. Believing that Dorian means to harm Sibyl, James hesitates to leave, and promises vengeance upon Dorian if any harm befalls her. After Sibyl's suicide, James becomes obsessed with killing Dorian, and stalks him, but a hunter accidentally kills James. The brother's pursuit of vengeance upon the lover (Dorian Gray) for the death of the sister (Sibyl Vane) parallels that of Laertes' vengeance against Prince Hamlet.
- Alan Campbell – chemist and one-time friend of Dorian who ended their friendship when Dorian's libertine reputation devalued such a friendship. Dorian blackmails Alan into destroying the body of the murdered Basil Hallward; Campbell later shoots himself dead.
- Lord Fermor – Lord Henry's uncle, who tells his nephew, Lord Henry Wotton, about the family lineage of Dorian Gray.
- Adrian Singleton – a youthful friend of Dorian's, whom he evidently introduced to opium addiction, which induced him to forge a cheque and made him a total outcast from his family and social set.
- Victoria, Lady Henry Wotton – Lord Henry's wife, whom he treats disdainfully; she later leaves him.
- Hetty – A farm girl whom Dorian breaks up with in an effort to redeem youth in his portrait.

== Major themes ==
=== Morality and societal influence ===
Dorian initially falls under Lord Henry's influence and "narcissistic perspective on art and life", despite Basil's warnings, but "eventually recognizes its limitations". Through Lord Henry's dialogue, Wilde is suggesting, as professor Dominic Manganiello pointed out, that creating art enacts the innate ability to conjure criminal impulses. Dorian's immersion in the elite social circles of Victorian London exposes him to a culture of superficiality and moral hypocrisy. Supporting this idea, Sheldon W. Liebman offered the example of Wilde's inclusion of a great psychological intellect held by Lord Henry. Before Sibyl's death, Henry was also a firm believer in vanity as the origin of a human being's irrationality. This concept is broken for Henry after Sibyl is found dead, the irony being that Dorian is the cause of her death and his motives are exactly as Lord Henry has taught them to him.

The novel presents other relationships that influence Dorian's way of life and his perception of the world, proving the influence of society and its values on a person. While Lord Henry is clearly a persona that fascinates and captures Dorian's attention, Manganiello also suggests that Basil is also a person that may "evoke a change of heart" in Dorian. However, at this point in the novel, Dorian has spent far too much time under Lord Henry's wing and brushes Basil off in "appositeness", leading Basil to claim that man has no soul but art does.

=== Homoeroticism and gender roles ===
The novel's representation of homoeroticism is subtle yet present by manifesting itself through interactions between male characters in a way that challenges the strict social norms of Victorian England. The novel begins with a conversation between Lord Henry and Basil, where Basil reveals his artistic admiration for Dorian, setting the scene for a story with themes such as beauty, art, and the consequences of vanity. The interaction introduces the characters and foreshadows the complicated relationship between the artist and his muse.

It has been noted by scholars that Wilde possibly chose the protagonist's name, Dorian, in reference to the Dorians of ancient Greece, argued to have been the first to introduce male same-sex initiation rituals to ancient Greek culture, being an allusion to Greek love.

Similarly, gender roles influence the relationships between characters and form their expectations and behaviors; in particular, the expectations of masculinity and the critique of the Victorian ideal of manhood are seen throughout the narrative. Dorian, with his eternal youth and beauty, challenges traditional male roles and the slow decay of his portrait reflects the deception of societal expectations. Additionally, the few female characters in the story, such as Sibyl, are portrayed in ways that critique the limited roles and harsh judgments reserved for women during that era. The novel's exploration of these themes provides commentary on the structures of Victorian society, revealing the performative side of gender roles that restrict and define both men and women.

=== Vanity and egotism ===
Through the central framing device of the portrait and Dorian's reaction to it, scholars have hinted that Wilde touches heavily on the themes of vanity and egotism within the work, through Dorian finding a medium to investigate both themes' relevance to Victorian society. In chapter 3, Dorian's upbringing is revealed. Dorian's father "was a junior officer in the infantry, 'a penniless fellow'... 'a mere nobody'..." (Wilde 35). According to scholar Richard J. Walker, Dorian's upbringing makes his vanity seemingly a product of it. Walker follows this claim through by showing, in chapter 7, Dorian's high taste. Dorian describes the east as a "Gothic creation with its 'dimly-lit streets' and 'evil-looking houses'" inhabited by "'[w]omen with horses voices,' drunkards that curse and chatter 'like monstrous apes', and 'grotesque children'" (Wilde 86/Walker 92). Walker, through this passage, makes the claim that Dorian's vanity makes him see anything that he doesn't have less than desirable.

Scholars have argued Dorian's downward spiral does not start until the painter Basil Hallward is captivated by his charms. According to Aati Alaati, a scholar who delves into the themes of decadence and vanity in his own writings, "Basil thinks that art should be unconscious, ideal, and remote, but he shows an extreme degree of self-consciousness" (Alaati, 13). We see how prior to the book's start Hallward's influence bleeds into Dorian, an influence that becomes more prominent once Lord Henry warns Dorian about the beauty he would lose through aging. Dorian goes as far as to say that "youth is the only thing worth having. When I find that I am growing old, I shall kill myself" (Wilde, 28). Through the influence of Lord Henry, Basil starts to notice how Lord Henry is molding Dorian Gray to living a corrupt double life. According to Dominic Manganiello, Dorian starts to believe that "sin no longer ravishes the beauty of the soul, as in the traditional view, but rather helps it to flourish", therefore allowing him to validate doing whatever he pleases as long as it feels good (Manganiello 26). Due to Henry's influence, Dorian becomes a self-centered and vain person, which ultimately becomes the reason for his fall into depravity. Dorian acts on hedonism, which leads him to becoming self-destructive and corrupt. This is why his portrait rots as he sins. Sarah Kofman says in her book Enigmas that "Dorian's soul, which has not yet lost its purity and innocence, becomes the object of desire for two men who want to attract it in opposite directions: one on whom he himself 'exercises' an influence but who has had no effect on him, the other who, by revealing the mystery of life to him, does indeed seize hold of his soul and makes devilish attempt to re-create him in his own image under the effect of his 'bad influence'"(Kofman, 28).

== Influences and allusions ==
=== Wilde's own life ===
Wilde wrote in an 1894 letter:

[The Picture of Dorian Gray] contains much of me in it – Basil Hallward is what I think I am; Lord Henry, what the world thinks me; Dorian is what I would like to be – in other ages, perhaps.

Hallward is supposed to have been formed after painter Charles Haslewood Shannon. Scholars generally accept that Lord Henry is partly inspired by Wilde's friend Lord Ronald Gower. It was purported that Wilde's inspiration for Dorian Gray was the poet John Gray, but Gray distanced himself from the rumour. Some believe that Wilde used Robert de Montesquiou in creating Dorian Gray.

=== Faust ===
Wilde is purported to have said, "in every first novel the hero is the author as Christ or Faust." In both the legend of Faust and in The Picture of Dorian Gray a temptation (ageless beauty) is placed before the protagonist, which he indulges. In each story, the protagonist entices a beautiful woman to love him, and then destroys her life. In the preface to the novel, Wilde said that the notion behind the tale is "old in the history of literature", but was a thematic subject to which he had "given a new form".

Unlike the academic Faust, the gentleman Dorian makes no deal with the Devil, who is represented by the cynical hedonist Lord Henry, who presents the temptation that will corrupt the virtue and innocence that Dorian possesses at the start of the story. Throughout, Lord Henry appears unaware of the effect of his actions upon the young man; and so frivolously advises Dorian, that "the only way to get rid of a temptation is to yield to it. Resist it, and your soul grows sick with longing." As such, the devilish Lord Henry is "leading Dorian into an unholy pact, by manipulating his innocence and insecurity."

=== Shakespeare ===
In the preface, Wilde speaks of the sub-human Caliban character from The Tempest. In chapter seven, when he goes to look for Sibyl but is instead met by her manager, he writes: "He felt as if he had come to look for Miranda and had been met by Caliban".

When Dorian tells Lord Henry about his new love Sibyl Vane, he mentions the Shakespeare plays in which she has acted, and refers to her by the name of the heroine of each play. In the 1891 version, Dorian describes his portrait by quoting Hamlet, (Note: The reference is in chapter 19. Lord Henry asks "By the way, what has become of that wonderful portrait [Basil] did of you?" Dorian's response, a few lines later, includes 'I am sorry I sat for it. The memory of the thing is hateful to me. Why do you talk of it? It used to remind me of those curious lines in some play—"Hamlet," I think—how do they run?— "Like the painting of a sorrow, A face without a heart." Yes: that is what it was like.') in which the eponymous character impels his potential suitor (Ophelia) to madness and possibly suicide, and Ophelia's brother (Laertes) to swear mortal revenge.

=== Joris-Karl Huysmans ===
The anonymous "poisonous French novel" that leads Dorian to his fall is a thematic variant of À rebours (1884), by Joris-Karl Huysmans. In the biography Oscar Wilde (1989), the literary critic Richard Ellmann said:

Wilde does not name the book, but at his trial he conceded that it was, or almost [was], Huysmans's À rebours ... to a correspondent, he wrote that he had played a "fantastic variation" upon À rebours, and someday must write it down. The references in Dorian Gray to specific chapters are deliberately inaccurate.

=== Possible Disraeli influence ===
Some commentators have suggested that The Picture of Dorian Gray was influenced by the British Prime Minister Benjamin Disraeli's (anonymously published) first novel Vivian Grey (1826), as "a kind of homage from one outsider to another". Part way through the book, which was serialised, Disraeli, in his capacity as the anonymous author, responds to criticism by readers of parts already published of "...the affectation, the flippancy, the arrogance, the wicked wit of this fictitious character" by explaining that he had "conceived of the character of a youth of great talents, whose mind had been corrupted...". He goes on to write: "To deem all things vain is the bitter portion of that mind, who, having known the world, dares to think.". The name of Dorian Gray's love interest, Sibyl Vane, may be a modified fusion of the title of Disraeli's best known novel (Sybil) and Vivian Grey's love interest Violet Fane, who, like Sibyl Vane, dies tragically. There is also a tale recounted within Vivian Grey in which the eyes in the portrait of a young man "...so beautiful...you cannot imagine..." move when its subject dies.

== Reactions ==
=== Contemporary response ===
Even after the removal of controversial text, The Picture of Dorian Gray offended the moral sensibilities of British book reviewers, to the extent, in some cases, of saying that Wilde merited prosecution for violating the laws guarding public morality.

In the 30 June 1890 issue of the Daily Chronicle, the book critic said that Wilde's novel contains "one element ... which will taint every young mind that comes in contact with it." In the 5 July 1890 issue of the Scots Observer, a reviewer asked "Why must Oscar Wilde 'go grubbing in muck-heaps?'" The book critic of The Irish Times said, The Picture of Dorian Gray was "first published to some scandal". Such book reviews achieved for the novel a "certain notoriety for being 'mawkish and nauseous', 'unclean', 'effeminate' and 'contaminating'." Such moralistic scandal arose from the novel's homoeroticism, which offended the sensibilities (social, literary, and aesthetic) of Victorian book critics. Most of the criticism was, however, personal, attacking Wilde for being a hedonist with values that deviated from the conventionally accepted morality of Victorian Britain.

In response to such criticism, Wilde aggressively defended his novel and the sanctity of art in his correspondence with the British press. Wilde also obscured the homoeroticism of the story and expanded the personal background of the characters in the 1891 book edition.

Due to the controversy, retailing chain WHSmith, then Britain's largest bookseller, withdrew every copy of the July 1890 issue of Lippincott's Monthly Magazine from its bookstalls in railway stations.

At Wilde's 1895 trials, the book was called a "perverted novel", and passages (from the magazine version) were read during cross-examination. The book's association with Wilde's trials further damaged the book's reputation. In the decade after Wilde's death in 1900, the authorized edition of the novel was published by Charles Carrington, who specialized in literary erotica.

=== Modern response ===
Until about the 1980s, the novel was mostly ignored and considered "unworthy" of critical attention; with Richard Ellmann even writing that "parts of the novel are wooden, padded, self-indulgent". Afterwards, critics began to reassess it as a masterpiece of Wilde's oeuvre. Joyce Carol Oates wrote of the book "it is exceptionally good – in fact, one of the strongest and most haunting of English novels", while noting that the reputation of the novel was still questionable. Allie Townsend of Time placed it eighth on her 6 October 2010 "must-read horror classics" list, remarking "Oscar Wilde's only novel, The Picture Of Dorian Gray is a beautifully brooding account of a man whose vanity leads him to wish for everlasting youth, and the spiraling menace of immortality." In March 2014, Robert McCrum of The Guardian listed it among the 100 best novels ever written in English, calling it "an arresting, and slightly camp, exercise in late-Victorian gothic".

== Legacy and adaptations ==
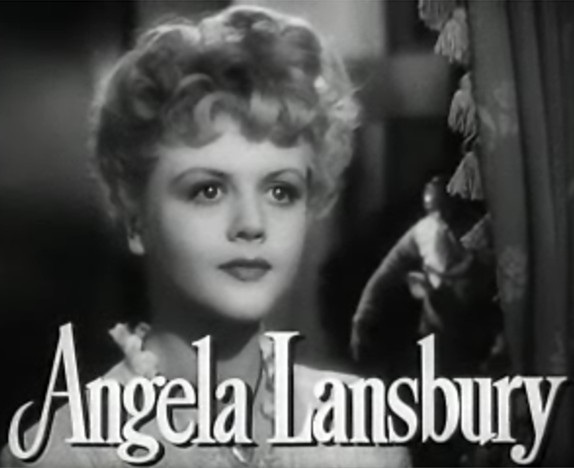
Angela Lansbury as Sibyl Vane in the film adaptation The Picture of Dorian Gray (1945). Lansbury was nominated for the Academy Award for Best Supporting Actress for her performance.

Though not initially a widely appreciated component of Wilde's body of work following his death in 1900, The Picture of Dorian Gray has come to attract a great deal of academic and popular interest, and has been the subject of many adaptations to film and stage.

In 1913, it was adapted to the stage by writer G. Constant Lounsbery at London's Vaudeville Theatre. In the same decade, it was the subject of several silent film adaptations. Perhaps the best-known and most critically praised film adaptation is 1945's The Picture of Dorian Gray, which earned an Academy Award for best black-and-white cinematography, as well as a Best Supporting Actress nomination for Angela Lansbury, who played Sibyl Vane.

In 2003, Stuart Townsend played Dorian Gray in the film League of Extraordinary Gentlemen. In 2009, the novel was loosely adapted into the film Dorian Gray, starring Ben Barnes as Dorian and Colin Firth as Lord Henry. Alexander Vlahos played the character in a series of audio dramas scripted by David Llewellyn in 2013. Reeve Carney portrays Dorian Gray in John Logan's Penny Dreadful, which aired on Showtime from 2014 to 2016.

The Dorian Awards are named in honor of Wilde, in reference to The Picture of Dorian Gray; the original award was a simple certificate with an image of Wilde along with a graphic of hands holding a black bow tie. The first Dorian Awards were announced in January 2010 (nominees were revealed the previous month).

== Bibliography ==
Editions include:

- The Complete Works of Oscar Wilde, Vol. 3: The Picture of Dorian Gray: The 1890 and 1891 Texts (Oxford: Oxford University Press, 2005). Critical edition in the Oxford English Texts edition of Wilde's Complete Works, edited with an introduction and notes by Joseph Bristow.
- The Picture of Dorian Gray (Oxford: Oxford World's Classics, 2008) ISBN 978-0-19-953598-9. Edited with an introduction and notes by Joseph Bristow, based on the 1891 text as presented in the 2005 OET edition.
- The Uncensored Picture of Dorian Gray (Belknap Press, 2011) ISBN 978-0-674-06631-1. Edited with an introduction by Nicholas Frankel. This edition presents the uncensored typescript of the 1890 magazine version.
- The Picture of Dorian Gray (New York: Norton Critical Editions, 2006) ISBN 978-0-393-92754-2. Edited with an introduction and notes by Michael Patrick Gillespie. Presents the 1890 magazine edition and the 1891 book edition side by side.
- The Picture of Dorian Gray (Harmondsworth: Penguin Classics, 2006), ISBN 978-0-14-144203-7. Edited with an introduction and notes by Robert Mighall. Included as an appendix is Peter Ackroyd's introduction to the 1986 Penguin Classics edition. It reproduces the 1891 book edition.
- The Picture of Dorian Gray (Broadview Press, 1998) ISBN 978-1-55111-126-1. Edited with an introduction and notes by Norman Page. Based on the 1891 book edition.
