= List of films: P =

indexed lists of films
0–9	A	B	C	D	E	F
G	H	I	J–K	L	M	N–O
P	Q–R	S	T	U–V–W	X–Y–Z	

This is an alphabetical list of film articles (or sections within articles about films). It includes made for television films. See the talk page for the method of indexing used.

== P ==
- P (2005)
- PASKAL: The Movie (2018)
- PCU (1994)
- P.J. (1968)
- PK (2014)
- P.K. and the Kid (1987)
- P.O.W. The Escape (1986)
- P.S. (2004)
- P.S. Your Cat Is Dead (2002)
- P.S. I Love You (2008)
- P'tit Quinquin (2014)
- P2 (2007)
- P4W: Prison for Women (1981)

=== Pa ===
- Pa Pa Wadi See Yin Khan (2019)
- Pa. Pandi (2017)
- Pa. Ra. Palanisamy (2010)
- Pa Va (2016)

==== Paa ====
- Paa (2009)
- Paadam (2018)
- Paadam Onnu: Oru Vilapam (2003)
- Paadasaram (1978)
- Paadatha Thenikkal (1988)
- Paadha Kaanikkai (1962)
- Paadhai Theriyudhu Paar (1960)
- Paadhukaappu (1970)
- Paadu Nilave (1987)
- Paadum Vaanampadi (1985)
- Paagal (2021)
- Paagalpan (2001)
- Paagan (2012)
- Paakanum Pola Irukku (2017)
- Paaladai (1967)
- Paalai (2011)
- Paalam (1983)
- Paalam (1990)
- Paalattu Kunjikannan (1980)
- Paalayam (1994)
- Paali (2007)
- Paalige Bandadde Panchamrutha (1963)
- Paalkkadal (1976)
- Paalooti Valartha Kili (1976)
- Paambhu Sattai (2017)
- Paan Singh Tomar (2012)
- Paanai Pidithaval Bhaagyasaali (1958)
- Paanch (2003)
- Paanch Adhyay (2012)
- Paanch Dushman (1973)
- Paanch Fauladi (1988)
- Paanch Ghantey Mien Paanch Crore (2012)
- Paanch Qaidi (1981)
- Paandav (1995)
- Paandi Nattu Thangam (1989)
- Paangshu (2020)
- Paanjajanyam (1982)
- Paano Kita Iibigin (2007)
- Paano ang Puso Ko? (1997)
- Paano na Kaya (2010)
- Paap Aur Punya (1974)
- Paap Ka Ant (1989)
- Paap Ki Duniya (1988)
- Paap Ki Kamaee (1990)
- Paap Ko Jalaa Kar Raakh Kar Doonga (1988)
- Paap Punno (2022)
- Paapam Cheyyathavar Kalleriyatte (2020)
- Paapi (1977)
- Paappan (2022)
- Paappi Appacha (2010)
- Paappi Devataa (1995)
- Paar (1984)
- Paar Magaley Paar (1963)
- Paara (1985)
- Paarai (2003)
- Paarambariyam (1993)
- Paari (1966)
- Paari (2000)
- Paarijatham (1976)
- Paartha Gnabagam Illayo (1985)
- Paarthal Pasu (1988)
- Paarthale Paravasam (2001)
- Paaru Paaru Pattanam Paaru (1986)
- Paarvai Ondre Pothume (2001)
- Paasa Paravaigal (1988)
- Paasam (1962)
- Paasamalargal (1994)
- Paathasala (2014)
- Paathi (2017)
- Paathira Sooryan (1981)
- Paathirapattu (1967)
- Paathshaala (2010)
- Paattali (1999)
- Paattali Magan (1990)
- Paatti Sollai Thattathe (1988)
- Paattinte Palazhy (2010)
- Paattondru Ketten (1991)
- Paattu Padava (1995)
- Paattu Vaathiyar (1995)
- Paattukku Naan Adimai (1990)
- Paattukku Oru Thalaivan (1989)
- Paattum Bharathamum (1975)
- Paava Kadhaigal (2020)
- Paava Mannippu (1961)
- Paavaadakkaari (1978)
- Paavada (2016)
- Paavai Vilakku (1960)
- Paavam Krooran (1984)
- Paavam Poornima (1984)
- Paavathin Sambalam (1978)
- Paavo, a Life in Five Courses (2010)
- Paayal (1992)
- Paayum Oli Nee Yenakku (2023)
- Paayum Puli (1983)
- Paayum Puli (2015)

==== Pab–Pac ====
- Pabitra Papi (1997)
- Pablo (2012)
- Pablo and Carolina (1957)
- Pabung Syam (2021)
- Pacar Ketinggalan Kereta (1989)
- Pacemaker (2012)
- Pachai Engira Kaathu (2012)
- Pachai Kodi (1990)
- Pachai Vilakku (2020)
- Pachhai Vilakku (1964)
- Pachaikili Muthucharam (2007)
- Pachakuthira (2006)
- Pachamama (2018)
- Pachamarathanalil (2008)
- Pachani Kapuram (1985)
- Pachanottukal (1973)
- Pachchak Kuthira (2006)
- Pachhadlela (2004)
- Pachuvum Kovalanum (2011)
- Pacientka Dr. Hegla (1940)
- Pacific 231 (1949)
- Pacific Banana (1981)
- Pacific Blackout (1941)
- Pacific Heights (1990)
- Pacific Palisades (1990)
- Pacific Rim (2013)
- Pacific Rim: Uprising (2018)
- Pacific Vibrations (1970)
- The Pacifier (2005)
- The Pack: (1977, 2010 & 2015)
- Pack Train (1953)
- Pack Up Your Troubles: (1932, 1939 & 1940)
- The Package: (1989, 2013 & 2018)
- Packages from Daddy (2016)
- Packed in a Trunk: The Lost Art of Edith Lake Wilkinson (2015)
- Packin' It In (1983 TV)
- Packing the Monkeys, Again! (2004)
- Paco (2009)
- Paco the Elegant (1952)
- Paco de Lucía: La búsqueda (2014)
- Paco and the Magical Book (2008)
- Pacquiao: The Movie (2006)
- The Pact: (2002 TV, 2003, 2006 & 2012)
- The Pact 2 (2014)
- Pact with the Devil: (1950 & 2004)

==== Pad ====
- Pad Gaye Pange (2024)
- Pad Man (2018)
- Pada (2022)
- Padagasalai (2010)
- Padagotti (1964)
- Padaharella Ammayi (1986)
- Padaharella Vayasu (1978)
- Padai Soozha (2011)
- Padai Thalaivan (2025)
- Padai Veetu Amman (2002)
- Padaiveeran (2018)
- Padaiyaanda Maaveeraa (2025)
- Padak (2012)
- Padakkalam (2025)
- Padakuthira (1978)
- Padamati Sandhya Ragam (1987)
- Padamudra (1988)
- Padandi Munduku (1962)
- Padatha Painkili (1957)
- Padatik: (1973 & 2024)
- Padauk Musical (2020)
- Padavettu (2022)
- Padavidhara (1967)
- Padayani (1986)
- Padayappa (1999)
- Padayottam: (1982 & 2018)
- Paddayi (2018)
- Padde Huli (2019)
- Paddington (2014)
- Paddington 2 (2017)
- Paddington in Peru (2025)
- Paddle to the Sea (1966)
- Padduram (2011)
- Paddy the Next Best Thing: (1923 & 1933)
- Padhavi Paduthum Paadu (2005)
- Padhe Padhe (2013)
- Padi Padi Leche Manasu (2018)
- Padi Pishir Barmi Baksha (1972)
- Padichakallan (1969)
- Padikada Pakkangal (2024)
- Padikkadavan: (1985 & 2009)
- Padikkadha Medhai (1960)
- Padikkadha Pannaiyar (1985)
- Paditha Penn (1956)
- Padithal Mattum Podhuma (1962)
- Padlocked (1926)
- Padmaavat (2018)
- Padmaragam (1975)
- Padmashree Laloo Prasad Yadav (2005)
- Padmatheertham (1978)
- Padmavyooham: (1973 & 2012)
- Padmini (2023)
- Padre (2016)
- Padre de Familia (2016)
- Padre nuestro: (1985, 2005 & 2007)
- Padre Padrone (1977)
- Padre Pio (2022)
- Padre Pio: Between Heaven and Earth (2000 TV)
- Padre Pio: Miracle Man (2000 TV)
- Padri (2005)
- Paduka Pattabhishekam (1945)
- Padunna Puzha (1968)
- Padutha Theeyaga (1998)
- Paduvaaralli Pandavaru (1978)

==== Pae–Paj ====
- Paella Today! (2017)
- Pafnucio Santo (1977)
- Pag Oras Mo, Oras Mo Na (2000)
- Pag-ibig Ko Sayo'y Totoo (1996)
- Pagadai Pagadai (2014)
- Pagadai Panirendu (1982)
- Pagadi Aattam (2017)
- Pagal (1940)
- Pagal Kanavu (2025)
- Pagal Nilavu (1985)
- Pagal Premi (2007)
- Pagala Karichu Tu (2014)
- Pagala Premi (2007)
- Pagalariyaan (2024)
- Pagale Vennela (2007)
- Pagalil Oru Iravu (1979)
- Pagalil Pournami (1990)
- Pagalpanti: (2018 & 2019)
- Pagan Love (1920)
- Pagan Love Song (1950)
- Pagan Moon (1932)
- Pagan Passions (1924)
- Paganini: (1923, 1934 & 1989)
- Paganini Horror (1989)
- Paganini Strikes Again (1973)
- Paganini in Venice (1929)
- Pagbabalik ng Panday (1981)
- Pagbabalik ng Probinsyano (1998)
- Page 3 (2005)
- Page Eight (2011 TV)
- A Page of Madness (1926)
- Page Miss Glory: (1935 & 1936)
- Page One: Inside the New York Times (2011)
- The Page Turner (2006)
- Pageant (2008)
- The Pagemaster (1994)
- Paheli (2005)
- Paid in Full: (1914, 1919, 1950 & 2002)
- Pain & Gain (2013)
- Pain and Glory (2019)
- Painful Indifference (1987)
- Painkiller Jane (2005 TV)
- Paint (2023)
- Paint Your Wagon (1969)
- Painted Angels (1997)
- The Painted Bird (2019)
- The Painted Desert (1931)
- Painted Skin: (1992 & 2008)
- Painted Skin: The Resurrection (2012)
- The Painted Veil: (1934 & 2006)
- The Painter and the Thief (2020)
- Painters Painting (1972)
- Paisan (1946)
- The Pajama Game (1957)
- Pajama Party (1964)

==== Pal–Pap ====
- The Pale Blue Eye (2022)
- The Pale Door (2020)
- Pale Flower (1964)
- Pale Moon (2014)
- Pale Rider (1985)
- The Paleface: (1922 & 1948)
- Palindromes (2004)
- The Pallbearer (1996)
- The Palm Beach Story (1942)
- Palm Springs: (1936 & 2020)
- Palm Springs Weekend (1963)
- Palmetto (1998)
- Palo Alto: (2007 & 2013)
- Palooka (1934)
- Palookaville (1995)
- Pals (1925)
- Pambattam (2024)
- Pamela (1945)
- Pamela, a Love Story (2023)
- Pammal K. Sambandam (2002)
- Pampered Youth (1925)
- Pan: (1922, 1995 & 2015)
- Pan's Labyrinth (2006)
- Panama Hattie (1942)
- Panda and the Magic Serpent (1958)
- Panda! Go, Panda! (1972)
- Pandaemonium (2000)
- Pandemic (2016)
- Pandemonium: (1982 & 1987)
- Pandora and the Flying Dutchman (1951)
- Pandora's Box: (1929 & 2008)
- Pandorum (2009)
- Panic: (1928, 1963, 1982 & 2000)
- Panic Beats (1983)
- Panic Button (2011)
- Panic in the City (1968)
- Panic High School (1978)
- The Panic in Needle Park (1971)
- Panic Room (2002)
- Panic in the Streets (1950)
- Panic in Year Zero! (1962)
- Panther (1995)
- Panther Girl of the Kongo (1955)
- Paokhum Ama (1983)
- Paolo il freddo (1974)
- Le Paon de Nuit (2015)
- Paparazzi: (1998 French, 1998 Italian & 2004)
- The Paper (1994)
- The Paper Chase (1973)
- Paper Clips Project (2004)
- Paper Heart (2009)
- Paper Lion (1968)
- Paper Man: (1971 & 2009)
- The Paper Man: (1963 & 2020)
- Paper Moon (1973)
- Paper Spiders (2020)
- The Paper Tigers (2020)
- Paper Towns (2015)
- The Paperboy: (1994 & 2012)
- Paperboys (2011)
- Paperhouse (1989)
- Papillon: (1973 & 2018)
- Pappa ante Portas (1991)
- Paprika: (2006 & 1991)

==== Par ====
- Par la fenêtre (1948)
- Par le trou de la serrure (1901)
- Par où t'es rentré ? On t'a pas vu sortir (1984)
- Para Para Sakura (2001)
- Para vestir santos (1955)
- Parable (1964)
- Paracelsus (1943)
- Parachute (2023)
- Parachute Battalion (1941)
- Parachute Jumper (1933)
- Parachute Nurse (1942)
- The Parade (2011)
- Parade: (1974 & 2009)
- Parade of the Reservists (1934)
- Parade en sept nuits (1941)
- Parade of the West (1930)
- Parade of the Wooden Soldiers (1933)
- Paradesi: (1953, 1998, 2007 & 2013)
- Paradh (2010)
- The Paradine Case (1947)
- Paradise: (1926, 1928, 1932, 1955, 1975 TV, 1982, 1984, 1991, 2011, 2013 American, 2013 Mexican, 2016 & 2023)
- Paradise Alley: (1958 & 1978)
- Paradise and Back (1964)
- Paradise Beach (2019)
- Paradise for Buster (1952)
- Paradise Camp (1986)
- Paradise Canyon (1935)
- Paradise City (2022)
- Paradise Drifters (2020)
- Paradise Express (1937)
- Paradise Falls (2013)
- Paradise Found (2003)
- Paradise Garden (1917)
- Paradise Grove (2003)
- Paradise Highway (2022)
- Paradise Hills (2019)
- Paradise Hotel: (2010 & 2019)
- Paradise Is Burning (2023)
- Paradise Island (1930)
- Paradise Isle (1937)
- Paradise Kiss (2011)
- Paradise Lost: (1940 & 2011)
- Paradise Lost 2: Revelations (2000)
- Paradise Lost 3: Purgatory (2011)
- Paradise Lost: The Child Murders at Robin Hood Hills (1996)
- Paradise Murdered (2007)
- Paradise Now (2005)
- Paradise Road: (1936 & 1997)
- Paradise Valley (1934)
- Paradise, Hawaiian Style (1966)
- Paradise, Texas (2006)
- Paradox: (2010 TV, 2016 & 2017)
- Paragraph 175 (2000)
- Parajanov: The Last Spring (1992)
- The Parallax View (1974)
- Parallel: (2018 & 2024)
- Parallel Mothers (2021)
- The Paramedic (2020)
- Paranoia: (1967, 1969, 1970 & 2013)
- Paranoia 1.0 (2004)
- Paranoiac (1963)
- Paranoid (2000)
- Paranoid Park (2007)
- Paranormal Activity series:
  - Paranormal Activity (2007)
  - Paranormal Activity 2 (2010)
  - Paranormal Activity 3 (2011)
  - Paranormal Activity 4 (2012)
  - Paranormal Activity: The Marked Ones (2014)
  - Paranormal Activity: The Ghost Dimension (2015)
  - Paranormal Activity: Next of Kin (2021)
- Paranormal Activity 2: Tokyo Night (2010)
- Paranormal Entity (2011)
- ParaNorman (2012)
- Parasite: (1982 & 2019)
- Parasyte: Part 1 (2014)
- Parasyte: Part 2 (2015)
- Pardes: (1950 & 1997)
- Pardners (1956)
- Pardon My Sarong (1942)
- Pardon Us (1931)
- The Parent Trap series:
  - The Parent Trap: (1961 & 1998)
  - The Parent Trap II (1986 TV)
  - Parent Trap III (1989 TV)
  - Parent Trap: Hawaiian Honeymoon (1989 TV)
- Parental Guidance (2012)
- Parenthood (1989)
- Parents: (1989, 2007 & 2016)
- Les Parents terribles: (1948 & 1980 TV)
- Paris After Dark (1943)
- Paris Belongs to Us (1961)
- Paris Holiday: (1958 & 2015)
- Paris Is Burning (1990)
- Paris Qui Dort (1924)
- Paris When It Sizzles (1964)
- Paris, je t'aime (2006)
- Paris, Texas (1984)
- Paris-Willouby (2015)
- The Park: (2003 & 2007)
- The Park Is Mine (1986 TV)
- Parker: (1984 & 2013)
- The Parole Officer (2001)
- The Parson's Widow (1920)
- Parthale Paravasam (2001)
- Partie de cartes (1895)
- Parting Glances (1986)
- Partition: (1987 & 2007)
- Partly Cloudy (2009)
- Partly Cloudy with Sunny Spells (2015)
- Partner: (1968, 2007 & 2008)
- Partners: (1932, 1982 & 2009)
- Parts: The Clonus Horror (1979)
- The Party: (1968, 1990 & 2017)
- The Party Animal (1984)
- Party Girl: (1930, 1958, 1995 & 2014)
- The Party and the Guests (1966)
- The Party at Kitty and Stud's (1970)
- Party Monster (2003)
- Party Monster: The Shockumentary (1998)
- Paru Wife of Devadas (2014)
- Parudeesa (2012)
- Parugo Parugu (1994)
- Parundhaaguthu Oor Kuruvi (2023)
- Parva (2002)
- Parvaaz: The Journey (2021)

==== Pas ====
- Pas de deux (1968)
- Pas în doi (1985)
- Pas på svinget i Solby (1940)
- Pas vdekjes (1980)
- Pasáček z doliny (1984)
- Pasahero (2024)
- Pasaje al amanecer (2016)
- El pasajero clandestino (1995)
- Pasakiligal (2006)
- Pasal Kau! (2020)
- Pasamalar (1961)
- Pasamulla Pandiyare (1997)
- Pasamum Nesamum (1964)
- Pasan Ko and Daigdig (1987)
- Pasand Apni Apni (1983)
- Pasang: In the Shadow of Everest (2022)
- Pasanga (2009)
- Pasanga 2 (2015)
- Pascual Duarte (1976)
- Pasolini (2014)
- Pass the Gravy (1928)
- A Passage to India (1984)
- Passage to Marseille (1944)
- Passages: (2004 & 2008)
- Passchendaele (2008)
- Passenger: (1963, 2009 & 2026)
- The Passenger: (1975, 2005 Éric Caravaca, 2005 François Rotger & 2026)
- Passenger 57 (1992)
- The Passenger – Welcome to Germany (1988)
- The Passengers: (1977 & 1999)
- Passengers: (2008 & 2016)
- Passing (2021)
- The Passing: (1983 & 2015)
- The Passing of Hell's Crown (1916)
- The Passing of the Third Floor Back: (1918 & 1935)
- Passion: (1925, 1954, 1982, 1998, 1999, 2005 & 2012)
- The Passion of Anna (1969)
- The Passion of the Christ (2004)
- The Passion of Darkly Noon (1995)
- Passion Fish (1992)
- The Passion of Joan of Arc (1928)
- Passion Play (2011)
- Passionada (2002)
- The Passionate Pursuits of Angela Bowen (2016)
- Passionate Summer (1956)
- Passions (1994)
- Passport to Paris (1999)
- Passport to Pimlico (1948)
- The Password is Courage (1962)
- The Past-Master (1970)

==== Pat ====
- Pat Garrett and Billy the Kid (1973)
- Pat and Mike (1952)
- Pata Nahi Rabb Kehdeyan Rangan Ch Raazi (2012)
- Pataakha (2018)
- Pataal Bhairavi (1985)
- Pataas (2015)
- Patagonia (2010)
- Pataki (2017)
- Patan Thi Pakistan (2013)
- Patang (1993)
- Patanga: (1949 & 1971)
- Patate (1964)
- Patay na si Hesus (2016)
- Patayin Mo Sa Sindak Si Barbara (1974)
- Patayin sa Sindak si Barbara (1995)
- Patch Adams (1998)
- A Patch of Blue (1965)
- The Patchwork Girl of Oz (1914)
- The Patent Leather Kid (1927)
- Paternity (1981)
- Paterno (2018 TV)
- Paterson (2016)
- Path to War (2002 TV)
- Pather Panchali (1955)
- Pathfinder: (1987 & 2007)
- The Pathfinder: (1952, 1987 & 1996 TV)
- Pathology (2008)
- Paths of Glory (1957)
- Patient Seven (2016)
- Patlabor: The Movie (1989)
- Patrick: (1978 & 2013)
- Patrick Still Lives (1980)
- The Patriot: (1928, 1938, 1953, 1986, 1998 & 2000)
- Patriot Games (1992)
- Patriotism: (1918 & 1966)
- Patriots Day (2016)
- El Patrullero (1991)
- The Patsy: (1928 & 1964)
- Pattas (2020)
- Patti Smith: Dream of Life (2008)
- Patton (1970)
- Patty Hearst (1988)

==== Pau–Paz ====
- Pau Brasil (2009)
- Paul (2011)
- Paul Blart: Mall Cop (2009)
- Paul Blart: Mall Cop 2 (2015)
- Paul Bunyan (1958)
- Paul, Apostle of Christ (2018)
- Paulie (1998)
- Pauline at the Beach (1983)
- Pauly Shore Is Dead (2003)
- The Pauper Millionaire (1922)
- Pauvre Pierrot (1892)
- Pavakkoothu (1990)
- Pavarotti (2019)
- Paw (1959)
- Paw Patrol: The Movie (2021)
- Paw Patrol: The Dino Movie (2026)
- Paw Patrol: The Mighty Movie (2023)
- Pawn: (2013 & 2020)
- Pawn Sacrifice (2014)
- Pawn Shop Chronicles (2013)
- The Pawnbroker (1964)
- Pawned (1922)
- Pawnee (1957)
- Pawns of Passion (1928)
- Pawnshop (2013)
- The Pawnshop (1916)
- Pawo (2016)
- Paws (1997)
- Paws of the Bear (1917)
- Paws, Bones & Rock'n'roll (2015)
- Paws of Fury: The Legend of Hank (2022)
- Paws Land (2024)
- Pawtucket Rising (2008)
- Pax: (1994 & 2011)
- Pax Americana and the Weaponization of Space (2009)
- Pay Day: (1918 & 1922)
- Pay or Die: (1960 & 2023)
- Pay the Ghost (2015)
- Pay It Forward (2000)
- Pay Me! (1917)
- Pay as You Enter (1928)
- Pay as You Exit (1936)
- Pay Your Dues (1919)
- Paya Enna Hiru Se (2009)
- Payal (1957)
- Payana (2008)
- Payanam: (1976 & 2011)
- Payanangal Mudivathillai (1982)
- Payanigal Gavanikkavum (2022)
- Payaso (1986)
- Payback: (1995, 1997 TV, 1999, 2010 & 2012)
- Payback Season (2012)
- Paycheck (2003)
- Payday: (1944, 1972 & 2018)
- Paydirt (2020)
- Paying Guest (1957)
- Paying Guests (2009)
- Paying the Limit (1924)
- Paying the Piper (1921)
- Paying the Price (1916)
- Paying the Price (1927)
- Paying the Price: Killing the Children of Iraq (2000) (TV)
- Payment Deferred (1932)
- Payment on Demand (1951)
- Payroll (1961)
- Paywall: The Business of Scholarship (2018)
- Paz! (2002)
- Pazhani: (1965 & 2008)
- Pazhaniappa Kalloori (2007)
- Pazhanjan Pranayam (2023)
- Pazhassi Raja (1964)
- Pazhaya Vannarapettai (2016)
- Pazze di me (2013)
- Pazzo d'amore (1942)

=== Pe ===
==== Pea ====
- Peace: (1949 & 2022)
- Peace Breaker (2017)
- Peace by Chocolate (2021)
- Peace on Earth (1939)
- Peace in the Fields (1970)
- Peace to Him Who Enters (1961)
- Peace Hotel (1995)
- Peace, Love & Misunderstanding (2011)
- Peace of Mind (1931)
- Peace Never Comes (1960)
- Peace Officer (2015)
- Peace Out (2011)
- Peace, Perfect Peace (1918)
- Peace, Propaganda & the Promised Land (2004)
- Peace on the Rhine (1938)
- Peace Street (1991)
- Peace to Us in Our Dreams (2015)
- Peaceable Kingdom (2004)
- Peaceable Kingdom: The Journey Home (2009)
- Peacefire (2008)
- Peaceful (2021)
- Peaceful Oscar (1927)
- Peaceful Peters (1922)
- Peaceful Warrior (2006)
- Peacemaker (1990)
- The Peacemaker: (1922, 1956 & 1997)
- Peach Girl (2017)
- The Peach Girl (1931)
- Peaches (2004)
- Peacock: (2005, 2010 & 2024)
- Peacock Alley: (1921 & 1930)
- Peak Everything (2025)
- Peaky Blinders: The Immortal Man (2026)
- The Peanut Butter Falcon (2019)
- The Peanut Butter Solution (1985)
- The Peanuts Movie (2015)
- The Pear Tree (1998)
- Pearl: (2016 & 2022)
- The Pearl (1947)
- The Pearl Button (2015)
- The Pearl of Death (1944)
- Pearl Harbor (2001)
- Pearls of the Deep (1966)
- The Pearls of the Stone Man (2015)
- A Peasant on a Bicycle (1974)

==== Peb–Peg ====
- The Pebble and the Boy (2021)
- The Pebble and the Penguin (1996)
- Pebbles (2021)
- The Pebbles of Étretat (1972)
- Pecado de amor (1961)
- Pecan Pie (2003)
- Peccato di castità (1956)
- La Pêche aux poissons rouges (1895)
- Peck Up Your Troubles (1945)
- Peck's Bad Boy: (1921 & 1934)
- Peck's Bad Boy with the Circus (1938)
- Peck's Bad Girl (1918)
- Pecker (1998)
- Pecoross' Mother and Her Days (2013)
- Pecos Cleans Up (1967)
- The Pecos Dandy (1934)
- The Pecos Kid (1935)
- The Pecos Pistol (1949)
- Pecos River (1951)
- Peculiar Attraction (1988)
- Peculiar Patients' Pranks (1915)
- Peculiar Penguins (1934)
- The Peculiar Sensation of Being Pat Ingoldsby (2022)
- Peculiarities of the Russian Bath (1999)
- Pedababu (2004)
- Pedaling to Freedom (2007)
- Pedarayudu (1995)
- Pedavi Datani Matokatundhi (2018)
- Pedda Gedda (1982)
- Pedda Manushulu: (1954 & 1999)
- Peddannayya (1997)
- Peddarikam (1992)
- Peddi (2026)
- Peddintalludu (1991)
- Peddlers (2012)
- Peddlin' in Society (1946)
- Pedicab Driver (1989)
- Pedrito de Andía's New Life (1965)
- Pedro: (2008 & 2021)
- Pedro Calungsod: Batang Martir (2013)
- Pedro Páramo: (1967 & 2024)
- Pee-wee's Big Adventure (1985)
- Pee-wee's Big Holiday (2016)
- Peechankai (2017)
- Peekaboo (2011)
- Peel: (1982 & 2019)
- Peelers (2016)
- Peeper (1975)
- Peepers (2010)
- Peeping Penguins (1937)
- Peeping Tom (1960)
- Peeples (2013)
- Peepli Live (2010)
- Peer Gynt: (1915, 1919 & 1934)
- Peg o' My Heart: (1922 & 1933)
- Peg O' My Heart (2024)
- Peg of Old Drury (1935)
- Peg Woffington: (1910 & 1912)
- Pegasus (2019)
- Pegasus 2 (2024)
- Pegasus 3 (2026)
- Pegeen (1920)
- Peggio per me... meglio per te (1967)
- Peggy: (1916 & 1950)
- Peggy Guggenheim: Art Addict (2015)
- Peggy on a Spree (1946)
- Peggy Sue Got Married (1986)
- Peggy, the Will O' the Wisp (1917)

==== Peh–Pen ====
- Pehchaan: (1993 & 2005)
- Pehchaan 3D (2013)
- Pehchan: (1946, 1970 & 1975)
- Pehla Nasha (1993)
- Pehla Pehla Pyar (1994)
- Pei Irukka Bayamen (2021)
- Peigal Jaakkirathai (2016)
- Pekamedalu (2024)
- Peking Express (1951)
- Peking Opera Blues (1986)
- The Pelican (1973)
- Pelican Blood: (2010 & 2019)
- The Pelican Brief (1993)
- Pelicanman (2004)
- Pelle the Conqueror (1987)
- Pelli (1997)
- Pelli Chesi Choodu (1952)
- Pelli Chesukundam (1997)
- Pelli Choopulu (2016)
- Pelli Kanuka: (1960 & 1998)
- Pelli Peetalu (1998)
- Pelli Pustakam: (1991 & 2013)
- Pelli Sambandham (2000)
- Pelli SandaD (2021)
- Pelli Sandadi: (1959 & 1996)
- Pelosi in the House (2022)
- Peluca (2003)
- Pen Vilai Verum 999 Rubai Mattume (2022)
- Penalty (2019)
- The Penalty: (1920 & 1941)
- Penalty Phase (1986) (TV)
- Penance: (2009 & 2018)
- Pencil (2016)
- Penda's Fen (1974) (TV)
- Pendatang (2023)
- Pendekar Bujang Lapok (1959)
- Pendli Pilupu (1961)
- Pendragon: Sword of His Father (2008)
- Penduko (2023)
- Pendular (2017)
- Pendulum: (1969, 2014 & 2023)
- Penelope: (1966, 1978 & 2006)
- Penguin (2020)
- Penguin Bloom (2020)
- Penguins (2019)
- Penguins of Madagascar (2014)
- Peninsula (2020)
- Penitentiary: (1938 & 1979)
- Penjamo (1953)
- Penn (1954)
- Penn Deivam (1970)
- Penn Endral Penn (1967)
- Penn Kulathin Pon Vilakku (1959)
- Penn Manam (1952)
- Penn Ondru Kanden (1974)
- Penn & Teller Get Killed (1989)
- Pennies from Heaven: (1936 & 1981)
- Penny Dreadful (2006)
- Penny Lane Is Dead (2025)
- Penny Points to Paradise (1951)
- Penny Princess (1952)
- Penny Serenade (1941)
- Penrod and Sam: (1923, 1931 & 1937)
- Pensione paura (1978)
- The Pentagon Wars (1998) (TV)

==== Peo–Per ====
- The People (1972) (TV)
- The People vs. George Lucas (2010)
- People I Know (2002)
- The People vs. Jean Harris (1981) (TV)
- The People vs. Larry Flynt (1996)
- People Like Us: (1980 & 2012)
- People of the Mountains (1942)
- The People Next Door: (1968 TV, 1970 & 1996 TV)
- People on Sunday (1930)
- The People That Time Forgot (1977)
- The People Under the Stairs (1991)
- People We Meet on Vacation (2026)
- People Will Talk (1951)
- People's Hero (1987)
- Pepe (1960)
- Pépé le Moko (1937)
- Peppermint (2018)
- Peppermint Candy (2000)
- Peppermint Soda (1977)
- Peque Gallaga's Scorpio Nights 2 (1999)
- Pequeña revancha (1986)
- Perazhagan (2004)
- Perceval le Gallois (1978)
- Percy: (1925, 1971, 1989 & 2020)
- Percy Jackson & the Olympians: The Lightning Thief (2010)
- Percy Jackson: Sea of Monsters (2013)
- Perdida: (1916, 2018 & 2019)
- Perdita Durango (1997)
- Le Père Noël a les yeux bleus (1969)
- Perfect: (1985, 2016 & 2018)
- Perfect Bid: The Contestant Who Knew Too Much (2017)
- Perfect Blue (1997)
- Perfect Blue: Yume Nara Samete (2002)
- A Perfect Couple (1979)
- The Perfect Couple (2007)
- Perfect Creature (2007)
- Perfect Day: (1929 & 2005 TV)
- Perfect Friday (1970)
- The Perfect Gamble (2025)
- A Perfect Getaway (2009)
- The Perfect Guy: (1998 & 2015)
- Perfect High (2015)
- The Perfect Host (2010)
- Perfect Imperfection (2016)
- A Perfect Little Man (1999)
- A Perfect Man: (2013 & 2015)
- The Perfect Man: (1939 & 2005)
- A Perfect Murder (1998)
- The Perfect Score (2004)
- Perfect Sense (2011)
- The Perfect Son (2000)
- The Perfect Storm (2000)
- Perfect Stranger (2007)
- Perfect Understanding (1933)
- A Perfect World (1993)
- The Perfection (2018)
- Performance (1970)
- Perfume (2001)
- Perfume: The Story of a Murderer (2006)
- Perhaps Love: (1987 & 2005)
- The Perils of Gwendoline in the Land of the Yik-Yak (1984)
- The Perils of Pauline: (1914, 1933, 1947 & 1967)
- The Perks of Being a Wallflower (2012)
- Permanent Midnight (1998)
- Permanent Record (1988)
- Permanent Vacation: (1980 & 2007)
- Permission (2017)
- Permission to Kill (1975)
- Perpetual Motion (2005)
- The Persecution and Assassination of Jean-Paul Marat as Performed by the Inmates of the Asylum at Charenton Under the Direction of the Marquis de Sade (1967)
- Persepolis (2007)
- Persona (1966)
- Persona 3 series:
  - Persona 3 The Movie: #1 Spring of Birth (2013)
  - Persona 3 The Movie: #2 Midsummer Knight's Dream (2014)
  - Persona 3 The Movie: #3 Falling Down (2015)
  - Persona 3 The Movie: #4 Winter of Rebirth (2016)
- Personal Best (1982)
- The Personal History of David Copperfield (2019)
- A Personal Journey with Martin Scorsese Through American Movies (1995) (TV)
- Personal Problems (1980)
- Personal Services (1987)
- Personal Shopper (2016)
- Personal Velocity: Three Portraits (2002)
- Persuasion: (1995 TV & 2007 TV)

==== Pes–Pey ====
- Pesadha Kannum Pesume (2002)
- Pesadilla para un rico (1996)
- Pesarattu (2015)
- Pescadores de perlas (1938)
- Peshavar Waltz (1994)
- Peshmerga (2016)
- The Pest (1917)
- The Pest (1919)
- The Pest (1922)
- The Pest (1997)
- A Pest in the House (1947)
- Pest Man Wins (1951)
- Pest from the West (1939)
- Pestalozzi's Mountain (1989)
- A Pestering Journey (2010)
- Pestonjee (1988)
- Pesum Deivam (1967)
- Pet (2016)
- Pet Fooled (2016)
- Pet Pals: Marco Polo's Code (2010)
- Pet Pals in Windland (2014)
- Pet Peeves (2025)
- Pet Sematary: (1989 & 2019)
- Pet Sematary: Bloodlines (2023)
- Pet Sematary Two (1992)
- Pet Shop (1994)
- Pet Shop Days (2013)
- Petal Dance (2013)
- Petals on the Wind (2014)
- Pete & Cleo (2010)
- Pete Kelly's Blues (1955)
- Pete, Pearl & the Pole (1973)
- Pete, the Pedal Polisher (1915)
- Pete and Repeat (1931)
- Pete Smalls Is Dead (2010)
- Pete 'n' Tillie (1972)
- Pete on the Way to Heaven (2009)
- Pete's Dragon: (1977 & 2016)
- Pete's Meteor (1998)
- Peter: (1934 & 2021)
- Peter I: The Last Tsar and the First Emperor (2022)
- Peter Andersen (1941)
- Peter Bell (2002)
- Peter Bell II: The Hunt for the Czar Crown (2003)
- Peter Doherty: Stranger in My Own Skin (2023)
- Peter the Great: (1910, 1922 & 1937)
- Peter Gunn (1989 TV)
- Peter Handke: In the Woods, Might Be Late (2016)
- Peter in Magicland (1990)
- Peter the Mariner (1929)
- Peter Pan: (1924, 1953, 1988 & 2003)
- Peter Pan & Wendy (2023)
- Peter Pan's Neverland Nightmare (2025)
- Peter, Paul and Nanette (1935)
- Peter och Petra (1989)
- Peter the Pirate (1925)
- Peter Rabbit (2018)
- Peter Rabbit 2: The Runaway (2021)
- Peter Shoots Down the Bird (1959)
- Peter and Vandy (2009)
- Peter von Kant (2022)
- Peter Voss, Hero of the Day (1959)
- Peter Voss, Thief of Millions: (1921, 1932, 1946 & 1958)
- Peter and the Wolf: (1946 & 2006)
- Peter-No-Tail (1981)
- Peter-No-Tail and the Great Treasure Hunt (2000)
- Peter-No-Tail in Americat (1985)
- Peter's Friends (1992)
- Peterloo (2018)
- Petey Wheatstraw (1977)
- Petha Manam Pithu (1973)
- Le Petit Soldat (1963)
- Petite Maman (2021)
- Petra (2018)
- Petria's Wreath (1980)
- The Petrified Forest: (1936 & 1973)
- PetroApocalypse Now? (2008 TV)
- Petrol (2022)
- Petroleum (1936)
- Petromax: (2019 & 2022)
- Petronella (1927)
- Petropolis: Aerial Perspectives on the Alberta Tar Sands (2009)
- Petrov's Flu (2021)
- Petrovka, 38 (1980)
- Pets (1973)
- Pets or Meat: The Return to Flint (1992) (TV)
- Pets United (2019)
- Petta (2019)
- Pett and Pott (1934)
- Petticoat Camp (1912)
- Petticoat Fever (1936)
- Petticoat Larceny (1943)
- Petticoat Loose (1922)
- Petticoat Pirates (1961)
- Petticoat Politics (1941)
- Pettigrew's Girl (1919)
- Pettikadai (2019)
- Pettilambattra (2018)
- Pettin' in the Park (1934)
- Petting Zoo (2015)
- Pettredutha Pillai (1993)
- Pettson & Findus: Fun Stuff (2014)
- Pettson och Findus – Kattonauten (2000)
- Petty Romance (2010)
- Petualangan Sherina (2000)
- Petualangan Sherina 2 (2023)
- Petulia (1968)
- Petunia (2012)
- Petya of My Petya (2021)
- Peuple en marche (1963)
- Peut-être (1999)
- Peyote Queen (1965)
- Peyton Place (1957)
- Peyton Place: The Next Generation (1985 TV)

=== Pg ===
- PG: Psycho Goreman (2020)

=== Ph ===
==== Pha ====
- Pha Ta Lone Gaung Kyar (1954)
- Phaansi (1978)
- Phaansi Ke Baad (1985)
- Phaedra (1962)
- Phakaat (2023)
- Phalana Abbayi Phalana Ammayi (2023)
- Phantasm series:
  - Phantasm (1979)
  - Phantasm II (1988)
  - Phantasm III: Lord of the Dead (1994)
  - Phantasm IV: Oblivion (1998)
  - Phantasm: Ravager (2016)
- Phantom (1922)
- Phantom (2002)
- Phantom (2013)
- Phantom (2015)
- Phantom (2023)
- The Phantom: (1931, 1961 TV, 1996 & 2021)
- The Phantom from 10,000 Leagues (1955)
- Phantom Beirut (1998)
- Phantom Below (2005)
- Phantom Boy (2015)
- The Phantom Carriage: (1921 & 1958)
- The Phantom of Hollywood (1974 TV)
- Phantom Lady (1944)
- The Phantom Lady (1945)
- The Phantom of Liberty (1974)
- The Phantom Lover (1995)
- Phantom of the Mall: Eric's Revenge (1989)
- Phantom of the Megaplex (2000 TV)
- The Phantom of the Moulin Rouge (1925)
- The Phantom of the Open (2021)
- The Phantom of the Opera: (1925, 1943, 1962, 1989, 1998 & 2004)
- The Phantom of the Operetta: (1955 & 1960)
- Phantom of the Paradise (1974)
- The Phantom Planet (1961)
- The Phantom of Soho (1964)
- Phantom: The Submarine (1999)
- Phantom Thread (2017)
- The Phantom Tollbooth (1970)
- Phantoms (1998)
- Phase IV: (1974 & 2002)
- Phat Girlz (2006)

==== Phe–Phy ====
- Phenomena (1985)
- Phenomenon (1996)
- Phenomenon II (2003 TV)
- Phil (2019)
- Phil the Alien (2004)
- Philomena (2013)
- Philadelphia (1993)
- The Philadelphia Experiment (1984)
- The Philadelphia Story (1940)
- Phileine Says Sorry (2003)
- Philosophy of a Knife (2008)
- Phineas and Ferb the Movie: Across the 2nd Dimension (2011)
- Phineas and Ferb the Movie: Candace Against the Universe (2020)
- Phir Janam Lenge Hum (1977)
- Phir Milenge (2004)
- Phobia: (1980, 1988, 2008, 2013 & 2016)
- Phoebe in Wonderland (2009)
- The Phoenician Scheme (2025)
- Phoenix: (1998, 2006 & 2014)
- The Phoenix (1959)
- Phone (2002)
- The Phone (2015)
- Phone Booth (2002)
- The Photographical Congress Arrives in Lyon (1895)
- Photographing Fairies (1997)
- Photographing a Ghost (1898)
- Phurbu & Tenzin (2014)
- The Phynx (1970)

=== Pi ===
- Pi (1998)
- Pi Day Die Day (2016)

==== Pia–Pim ====
- Piaf (1974)
- Piaffe (2022)
- The Pianist: (1991, 1998 & 2002)
- Piange... il telefono (1975)
- The Piano (1993)
- Piano Blues (2003)
- Piano Girl (2009)
- Piano Mover (1932)
- A Piano for Mrs. Cimino (1982)
- Piano Piano Kid (1991)
- The Piano Teacher (2001)
- Pianoforte (1984)
- Pianomania (2009)
- Piazza Fontana: The Italian Conspiracy (2012)
- Picasso (2019)
- Picasso at the Lapin Agile (2008)
- Picasso Trigger (1988)
- Picasso's Face (2000)
- Piccadilly (1929)
- Piccadilly Incident (1946)
- The Pick-up Artist (1987)
- Picking Up the Pieces (2000)
- Pickpocket (1959)
- Pickpockets (2018)
- Pickup on South Street (1953)
- The Pickwick Papers: (1913, 1952 & 1985)
- Picnic: (1955, 1975 & 1996)
- Picnic at Hanging Rock (1975)
- A Picnic on the Grass (1937)
- Picture Bride (1995)
- The Picture of Dorian Gray: (1913, 1915, 1916, 1917, 1918, 1945, 1976 TV & 2004)
- Picture Perfect: (1995 & 1997)
- Pictures of the Old World (1972)
- A Picture of You (2014)
- A Piece of the Action (1977)
- A Piece of Cake (1948)
- A Piece of Eden (2000)
- A Piece of Heaven (1957)
- A Piece of My Heart (2019)
- A Piece of Sky: (1980, 2002 & 2022)
- Pieces (1982)
- Pieces of April (2003)
- Pieces of a Woman (2020)
- The Pied Piper: (1933, 1942, 1972 & 1986)
- Pied Piper of Cleveland (1955)
- The Pied Piper of Hamelin: (1918 & 1957 TV)
- Piercing (2018)
- Pierrepoint (2006)
- Pierrot le fou (1965)
- Pietà (2012)
- Pig: (1998, 2010, 2011, 2018 & 2021)
- A Pig's Tail (2012)
- The Pigeon Egg Strategy (1998)
- A Pigeon Sat on a Branch Reflecting on Existence (2014)
- Piglet's Big Movie (2003)
- Pigs: (1973, 1992 & 2007)
- Pigs and Battleships (1961)
- Pigs is Pigs (1937)
- Pigs in a Polka (1943)
- Pigskin Parade (1936)
- Pigsty (1969)
- Pihu (2018)
- Pilgrim (2000)
- The Pilgrim: (1923 & 2014)
- Pilgrim Hill (2013)
- The Pilgrim's Progress (2019)
- Pilgrim's Progress: Journey to Heaven (2008)
- Pilgrimage: (1933, 2001 & 2017)
- The Pillar of Fire (1899)
- The Pillow Book (1996)
- Pillow Talk (1959)
- A Pilot Returns (1942)
- Pimpernel Smith (1941)

==== Pin ====
- Pin (1989)
- A Pin for the Butterfly (1994)
- Pin Cushion (2017)
- Pin Pon (2003)
- Pin Up Girl (1944)
- Pina (2011)
- Pinamar (2017)
- Pinay Pie (2003)
- Pinball: The Man Who Saved the Game (2022)
- Pincers on Japan (1943)
- Pinch (2019)
- Pinchuhridhayam (1966)
- Pind Di Kurhi (1963)
- Pind Di Kurhi (2005)
- Pind Peya Saara Jombieland Baneya (2025)
- Pindadaan (2016)
- Pindorama (1970)
- Pineapple Express (2008)
- Piñero (2001)
- Ping Pong: (1986, 2002 & 2012)
- Pink: (2011 & 2016)
- The Pink Cloud (2021)
- Pink Dream (1932)
- Pink Five (2002)
- Pink Five Strikes Back (2004)
- Pink Flamingos (1972)
- Pink Floyd The Wall (1982)
- Pink Floyd: Live at Pompeii (1972)
- Pink and Gray (2016)
- The Pink Jungle (1968)
- The Pink Panther: (1963 & 2006)
- The Pink Panther 2 (2009)
- The Pink Panther Strikes Again (1976)
- Pink Skies Ahead (2020)
- The Pink Slippers (1927)
- Pinkeltje (1978)
- Pinky (1949)
- Pinocchio: (1940, 1967, 1968, 2002, 2008, 2012, 2019, 2022 live-action & 2022 animated)
- Pinocchio 3000 (2004)
- Pinocchio: A True Story (2022)
- Pinocchio and the Emperor of the Night (1987)
- Pinocchio in Outer Space (1965)
- Pinocchio's Revenge (1996)
- A Pinwheel Without Wind (2002)

==== Pio–Piz ====
- Pioneer (2013)
- Pioneer Days (1930)
- Pioneer Days (1940)
- Pioneer Heroes (2015)
- Pioneer Justice (1947)
- Pioneer Marshal (1949)
- Pioneer Trail (1938)
- Pioneer's Gold (1924)
- Pioneers of the Frontier (1940)
- Pioneers in Petticoats (1969)
- Pioneers of the West (1940)
- Pipe Dream (2002)
- Pipe Dreams (1916)
- Pipe Dreams (1976)
- Pipe the Whiskers (1918)
- Pipeline (2021)
- Piper (2016)
- The Piper (2015)
- Pipí Mil Pupú 2 Lucas (2012)
- Pipo en de p-p-Parelridder (2003)
- Pippa (2023)
- Pippa Passes (1909)
- Pippi Goes on Board (1969)
- Pippi Longstocking: (1949, 1969 & 1997)
- Pippi on the Run (1970)
- Pippi in the South Seas (1970)
- Piranha (1972)
- Piranha series:
  - Piranha: (1978, 1995 & 2010)
  - Piranha II: The Spawning (1982)
  - Piranha 3DD (2012)
- Piranhas (2019)
- The Pirate: (1947, 1973, 1978 & 1984)
- The Pirate Movie (1982)
- Pirates: (1986, 2005 & 2021)
- The Pirates (2014)
- Pirates II: Stagnetti's Revenge (2008)
- Pirates of the Caribbean series:
  - Pirates of the Caribbean: The Curse of the Black Pearl (2003)
  - Pirates of the Caribbean: Dead Man's Chest (2006)
  - Pirates of the Caribbean: At World's End (2007)
  - Pirates of the Caribbean: On Stranger Tides (2011)
  - Pirates of the Caribbean: Dead Men Tell No Tales (2017)
- Pirates of Silicon Valley (1999) (TV)
- The Pirates Who Don't Do Anything: A VeggieTales Movie (2008)
- The Pirates! In an Adventure with Scientists! (2012)
- Pisaj (2004)
- La Piscine (1969)
- Pistachio – The Little Boy That Woodn't (2010)
- Pistol Opera (2001)
- A Pistol for Ringo (1965)
- A Pistol Shot: (1942 & 1966)
- The Pit: (1981 & 2020)
- A Pit Boy's Romance (1917)
- The Pit and the Pendulum: (1913, 1961, 1964, 1991 & 2009)
- Pitch Black (2000)
- Pitch Perfect series:
  - Pitch Perfect (2012)
  - Pitch Perfect 2 (2015)
  - Pitch Perfect 3 (2017)
- Pitfall: (1948 & 1962)
- Pithamagan (2003)
- Pittsburgh: (1942 & 2006)
- Piuma (2016)
- Pius XII: Under the Roman Sky (2010) (TV)
- Pixel Perfect (2004) (TV)
- Pixels: (2010 & 2015)
- Pixie (2020)
- Pixies (2015)
- Pixote: The Law of the Weakest (1981)
- Piya Ke Gaon (1985)
- Piya Rakhiah Senurwa Ke Laaj (1987)
- Piya Toote Na Piritia Hamaar (1990)
- Piyabanna Ayeth (2022)
- Piyoli Phukan (1955)
- Pizza (2005)
- Pizza (2014)
- Pizza series:
  - Pizza (2012)
  - Pizza II: Villa (2013)
  - Pizza 3: The Mummy (2023)
- Pizza, Beer, and Cigarettes (1998)
- Pizza Connection (1985)
- A Pizza in Jordbro (1994)
- Pizza: A Love Story (2019)
- Pizza Man (1991)
- Pizza Man (2011)
- Pizza Movie (2026)
- Pizza Movies (2026)
- Pizza My Heart (2005) (TV)
- A Pizza Tweety-Pie (1958)

=== Pl ===
==== Pla ====
- A Place Between – The Story of an Adoption (2007)
- The Place Beyond the Pines (2012)
- Place of Bones (2023)
- A Place to Call Home: (1970 & 1987 TV)
- A Place Called Chiapas (1998)
- Place des Cordeliers à Lyon (1895)
- A Place for Annie (1994)
- A Place to Fight For (2023)
- A Place to Go (1963)
- A Place to Grow (1995)
- A Place in the Land (1998)
- A Place to Live (1941)
- A Place to Be Loved (1993)
- A Place for Lovers (1968)
- A Place Nearby (2000)
- A Place of One's Own (1945)
- The Place Promised in Our Early Days (2004)
- A Place in the Sun (1951)
- Place Under the Sun (1986)
- Place Vendôme (1998)
- Placebo Effect (1998)
- Places in the Heart (1984)
- Plague: (1979 & 2014)
- The Plague: (1992, 2006 & 2025)
- The Plagues of Breslau (2018)
- The Plague Dogs (1982)
- Plague Town (2008)
- The Plague of the Zombies (1966)
- Plagues & Pleasures on the Salton Sea (2004)
- Plain and Simple (2016)
- The Plainsman: (1936 & 1966)
- Le Plaisir (1952)
- The Plan: (2014 & 2015)
- Plan 9 (2015)
- Plan 9 from Outer Space (1957)
- Plan 10 from Outer Space (1994)
- Plan 75 (2022)
- Plan A (2021)
- Plan A Plan B (2022)
- Plan B: (2009, 2019 & 2021)
- Plan Bee (2008)
- Plan V (2018)
- Plane (2023)
- Plane Crazy (1928)
- Plane Daffy (1944)
- Plane Dippy (1936)
- Plane Nuts (1933)
- Planes (2013)
- Planes: Fire & Rescue (2014)
- Planes, Trains and Automobiles (1987)
- Planes, Trains and Eric (2014)
- Planet 51 (2009)
- Planet of the Apes series:
  - Planet of the Apes: (1968 & 2001)
  - Beneath the Planet of the Apes (1970)
  - Escape from the Planet of the Apes (1971)
  - Conquest of the Planet of the Apes (1972)
  - Battle for the Planet of the Apes (1973)
  - Rise of the Planet of the Apes (2011)
  - Dawn of the Planet of the Apes (2014)
  - War for the Planet of the Apes (2017)
  - Kingdom of the Planet of the Apes (2024)
- Planet B (2024)
- Planet of Dinosaurs (1977)
- Planet Earth (1974) (TV)
- Planet of the Humans (2019)
- Planet Terror (2007)
- Planet of the Vampires (1965)
- El Planeta (2021)
- Planetarian: Storyteller of the Stars (2016)
- Planetarium (2016)
- The Plank: (1967 & 1979)
- The Planter's Wife: (1908 & 1952)
- The Plastic Age (1925)
- Plastic Bag (2009)
- Plastic City (2008)
- Platform: (1993 & 2000)
- The Platform (2019)
- Platinum Blonde (1931)
- Plato's Academy (2009)
- Platoon (1986)
- Platoon Leader (1988)
- Play or Die (2019)
- Play Dirty: (1969 & 2025)
- Play the Game (2009)
- Play It Again, Sam (1972)
- Play It to the Bone (2000)
- Play It as It Lays (1972)
- Play Misty for Me (1971)
- Play Motel (1979)
- Play Murder for Me (1990)
- Play Up the Band (1935)
- Playback (2012)
- Play'd: A Hip Hop Story (2002) (TV)
- Played (2006)
- The Player: (1953 & 1992)
- Player 5150 (2008)
- The Players Club (1998)
- Playgirl (1954)
- Playground: (2009 & 2021)
- Playhouse (2020)
- The Playhouse (1921)
- Playing (2007)
- Playing Around (1930)
- Playing Beatie Bow (1986)
- Playing Columbine (2008)
- Playing Dead (2013)
- Playing with Dolls (2015)
- Playing with Dolls: Bloodlust (2016)
- Playing the Game (1918)
- Playing God: (1997 & 2021)
- Playing Hard (2018)
- Playing by Heart (1999)
- Playing It Cool (2014)
- Playing for Keeps: (1986 & 2012)
- Playing Mona Lisa (2000)
- Playing the Ponies (1937)
- Playing with Souls (1925)
- Playing with Stars (2021)
- Playing for Time (1980) (TV)
- Playing the Victim (2006)
- Playmaker (1994)
- Playmobil: The Movie (2019)
- Playtime (1967)

==== Ple–Ply ====
- Plead Guilty (1983)
- Pleasantville (1998)
- Pleasant Goat and Big Big Wolf series:
  - Pleasant Goat and Big Big Wolf - The Super Adventure (2009)
  - Pleasant Goat and Big Big Wolf: The Tiger Prowess (2010)
  - Pleasant Goat and Big Big Wolf – Moon Castle: The Space Adventure (2011)
  - Pleasant Goat and Big Big Wolf – Mission Incredible: Adventures on the Dragon's Trail (2012)
  - Pleasant Goat and Big Big Wolf – The Mythical Ark: Adventures in Love & Happiness (2013)
  - Pleasant Goat and Big Big Wolf – Meet the Pegasus (2014)
  - Pleasant Goat and Big Big Wolf – Amazing Pleasant Goat (2015)
  - Pleasant Goat and Big Big Wolf: Dunk for Future (2022)
  - Pleasant Goat and Big Big Wolf: The World Guardians (2024)
  - Pleasant Goat and Big Big Wolf: Bright New Dawn (2025)
  - Pleasant Goat and Big Big Wolf: Dunk for Future 2 (2027)
- Please (1933)
- Please Baby Please (2022)
- Please Believe Me (1949)
- Please Do Not Disturb (2010)
- Please Don't Destroy: The Treasure of Foggy Mountain (2023)
- Please Don't Eat the Daisies (1960)
- Please Give (2010)
- Please Speak Continuously and Describe Your Experiences as They Come to You (2019)
- Pleasure: (1931, 2013 & 2021)
- The Pleasure (1985)
- The Pleasure of Being Robbed (2008)
- Pleasure Factory (2007)
- The Pleasure Garden: (1925 & 1952)
- Pleasure and Suffering (1971)
- Pledge (2018)
- The Pledge (2001)
- Pledge Night (1990)
- Plenty (1985)
- Plimpton! Starring George Plimpton as Himself (2013)
- Ploey: You Never Fly Alone (2018)
- Plop Goes the Weasel (1953)
- Plot (1972)
- Plot of Fear (1976)
- Plot No. 5 (1981)
- Plot Number 302 (2025)
- Plot for Peace (2013)
- Plot on the Stage (1953)
- Plots with a View (2002)
- The Plow That Broke the Plains (1936)
- Ploy (2007)
- Plucking the Daisy (1956)
- Plug & Pray (2010)
- Plugg (1975)
- Plughead Rewired: Circuitry Man II (1994)
- Plum Blossom (2000)
- Plumbum, or The Dangerous Game (1987)
- Plunder (1931)
- Plunder of Peach and Plum (1934)
- Plunder Road (1957)
- Plunderers of Painted Flats (1959)
- Plunge Into Darkness (1978) (TV)
- Plunging Hoofs (1929)
- Plunkett & Macleane (1999)
- Plurality (2021)
- Plus (2015)
- Plus One (2008)
- Plus One (2019)
- Plus Two (2010)
- Plush (2013)
- Pluto (2012)
- Pluto (2026)
- Pluto's Blue Note (1947)
- Pluto's Christmas Tree (1952)
- Pluto's Judgement Day (1935)
- Pluto's Party (1952)
- Plymouth (1991) (TV)

=== Po ===
- Po čem muži touží (2018)
- Po di Sangui (1996)
- Po strništi bos (2017)

==== Poa–Poe ====
- Poacher (2018)
- The Poacher: (1926 & 1953)
- The Poacher from Egerland (1934)
- The Poacher of the Silver Wood (1957)
- The Poacher's Foster Daughter or Noble Millionaire (1949)
- The Poacher's Pardon (1912)
- Pobočník Jeho Výsosti (1933)
- Pobres habrá siempre (1958)
- Pocahontas: (1910, 1994 & 1995)
- Pocahontas II: Journey to a New World (1998)
- Pocahontas: The Legend (1995)
- The Pocatello Kid (1931)
- Pocket Gangsters (2015)
- Pocket Listing (2016)
- Pocket Maar: (1956 & 1974)
- Pocket Money (1972)
- Pocket Ninjas (1994)
- Pocketful of Miracles (1961)
- Pocong vs Kuntilanak (2008)
- Pod (2015)
- Pod banderą miłości (1929)
- Podaa Podi (2012)
- Podhale w ogniu (1956)
- Podhu Nalan Karudhi (2019)
- Podhuvaga Emmanasu Thangam (2017)
- Podia Ser Pior (2009)
- Podium (2004)
- Podkova (1913)
- Podmo Patar Jol (2015)
- Poem of the Sea (1958)
- Poesias Para Gael (2017)
- The Poet: (1956 & 2007)
- Poet Anderson: The Dream Walker (2014)
- The Poet and the Boy (2017)
- Poet on a Business Trip (2015)
- The Poet and the Little Mother (1959)
- Poet and Muse (1978)
- The Poet of the Peaks (1912)
- The Poet and the Tsar (1927)
- The Poet's Windfall (1918)
- Poeten og Lillemor i forårshumør (1961)
- Poeten og Lillemor og Lotte (1960)
- Poetic Justice (1993)
- Poetical Refugee (2001)
- Poetry (2010)
- Poetry in Motion (1982)
- Poetry of Witness (2015)

==== Poi–Pok ====
- Poi (2006)
- Poi Mugangal (1986)
- Poi Satchi (1982)
- Poi Solla Porom (2008)
- Poikkal Kudhirai (1983)
- Poikkal Kudhirai (2022)
- The Point (2006)
- Point 905 (1960)
- Point of Betrayal (1995)
- Point Blank: (1967, 1998, 2010 & 2019)
- Point Break: (1991 & 2015)
- Point de chute (1970)
- Point of Departure (1966 TV)
- Point of Impact (1993)
- Point Last Seen (1998)
- Point and Line to Plane (2020)
- The Point Men: (1991 & 2023)
- Point of No Return: (1993 & 1995)
- Point of Order (1964)
- Point of Origin (2002)
- Point, Point, Comma... (1972)
- Point and Shoot (2014)
- Point of Terror (1971)
- Point of View (1965)
- The Point of View (1920)
- The Point! (1971)
- Pointed Heels (1929)
- The Pointer (1939)
- The Pointing Finger: (1919, 1922 & 1933)
- Points West (1929)
- The Pointsman (1986)
- Poison (1991)
- Poison (2024)
- La Poison (1951)
- Poison Dust (2005)
- Poison Friends (2006)
- Poison Gas (1929)
- Poison Ivy (1985 TV)
- Poison Ivy series:
  - Poison Ivy (1992)
  - Poison Ivy II: Lily (1996)
  - Poison Ivy: The New Seduction (1997)
  - Poison Ivy: The Secret Society (2008 TV)
- Poison Pen: (1939 & 2014)
- The Poison Rose (2019)
- The Poison Tasters (1995)
- Poison in the Zoo (1952)
- The Poisoned Diamond (1933)
- The Poisoned Light (1921)
- Poisoned by Love: The Kern County Murders (1993 TV)
- Poisoned Paradise: The Forbidden Story of Monte Carlo (1924)
- The Poisoner (2006 TV)
- The Poisoned Stream (1921)
- Poisonous Roses (2018)
- Poisons or the World History of Poisoning (2001)
- Poitín (1978)
- Poka Makorer Ghor Bosoti (1996)
- Pokémon series:
  - Pokémon 3: The Movie (2001)
  - Pokémon 4Ever (2002)
  - Pokémon: Arceus and the Jewel of Life (2009)
  - Pokémon: Destiny Deoxys (2005)
  - Pokémon: The First Movie (1999)
  - Pokémon: Giratina and the Sky Warrior (2009)
  - Pokémon Heroes (2003)
  - Pokémon: Jirachi Wishmaker (2004)
  - Pokémon: Lucario and the Mystery of Mew (2006)
  - Pokémon: The Mastermind of Mirage Pokémon (2006 TV)
  - Pokémon: The Movie 2000 (2000)
  - Pokémon the Movie: Black - Victini and Reshiram (2011)
  - Pokémon the Movie: Diancie and the Cocoon of Destruction (2014)
  - Pokémon the Movie: Genesect and the Legend Awakened (2013)
  - Pokémon the Movie: Hoopa and the Clash of Ages (2015)
  - Pokémon the Movie: I Choose You! (2017)
  - Pokémon the Movie: Kyurem vs. the Sword of Justice (2012)
  - Pokémon: Mewtwo Strikes Back: Evolution (2020)
  - Pokémon the Movie: The Power of Us (2018)
  - Pokémon the Movie: Volcanion and the Mechanical Marvel (2016)
  - Pokémon the Movie: White - Victini and Zekrom (2011)
  - Pokémon Ranger and the Temple of the Sea (2007)
  - Pokémon: The Rise of Darkrai (2008)
  - Pokémon: Zoroark: Master of Illusions (2011)
- Poker (1951)
- Poker Alice (1987 TV)
- Poker in Bed (1974)
- The Poker Club (2008)
- Poker Face (2012)
- Poker Face (2022)
- Poker Faces (1926)
- The Poker House (2008)
- Poker King (2009)
- Poker Night (2014)
- Pokhi (1998)
- Pokiri (2006)
- Pokiri Raja (1995)
- Pokkattadikkaari (1978)
- Pokkiri (2007)
- Pokkiri Mannan (2015)
- Pokkiri Raja: (1982, 2010 & 2016)
- Pokkiri Simon (2017)
- Pokkiri Thambi (1992)
- Pokkisham (2009)
- Pokkuveyil (1982)
- Pokrajina št. 2 (2008)
- The Pokrovsky Gate (1982)

==== Pol–Pom ====
- Pola Negri: Life Is a Dream in Cinema (2006)
- Pola X (1999)
- Pola's March (2001)
- Polam Pol (2016)
- Polanski Unauthorized (2009)
- Polar (2019)
- Polar Adventure (2015)
- The Polar Bear (1998)
- Polar Bear (2022)
- The Polar Bear King (1991)
- Polar Bears: A Summer Odyssey (2012)
- The Polar Express (2004)
- The Polar Star (1919)
- Polar Trappers (1938)
- Polaris (2016)
- Polaroid (2019)
- Polaroid Song (2012)
- Pole Poppenspäler (1954)
- Poley Poley Urey Mon (2011)
- Poli Huduga (1989)
- Policarpo (1959)
- Police: (1916, 1958, 1985 & 2005)
- Police Academy series:
  - Police Academy (1984)
  - Police Academy 2: Their First Assignment (1985)
  - Police Academy 3: Back in Training (1986)
  - Police Academy 4: Citizens on Patrol (1987)
  - Police Academy 5: Assignment Miami Beach (1988)
  - Police Academy 6: City Under Siege (1989)
  - Police Academy 7: Mission to Moscow (1994)
- Police Aur Mujrim (1992)
- Police Beat (2005)
- Police Bharya (1990)
- Police Brothers (1992)
- Police Bullets (1942)
- Police Call (1933)
- Police Calling 091 (1960)
- Police Chief Antek (1935)
- Police Chief Pepe (1969)
- Police Court (1932)
- Police Crop: The Winchester Conspiracy (1990 TV)
- Police Force: An Inside Story (2004)
- Police Lockup (1992)
- Police Matthu Dada (1991)
- The Police Murderer (1994)
- Police Nurse (1963)
- Police Officer (1992)
- The Police Officer's Wife (2013)
- The Police Patrol (1925)
- Police Police (2010)
- Police Public (1990)
- Police Python 357 (1976)
- Police Quarters (2010)
- The Police Serve the Citizens? (1973)
- Police Spy 77 (1930)
- Police State: (1989 TV & 2017)
- Police Story (1979)
- Police Story series:
  - Police Story (1987)
  - Police Story 2 (1988)
  - Police Story 2013 (2013)
  - Police Story 3: Super Cop (1992)
  - Police Story 4: First Strike (1996)
- Police Story series:
  - Police Story (1996)
  - Police Story 2 (2007)
  - Police Story 3 (2011)
- Police Story: Confessions of a Lady Cop (1980 TV)
- The Police Tapes (1977 TV)
- The Police War (1979)
- Police Woman (1973)
- Policegiri (2013)
- Policekaran Magal (1962)
- Policeman (2011)
- The Policeman (1971)
- The Policeman of the 16th Precinct (1959)
- The Policeman's Lineage (2022)
- Policemen (1995)
- Policena Hendthi (1990)
- Policewala Gunda (1995)
- Policewoman (1974)
- Policewoman Centerfold (1983)
- Policewomen (1974)
- Poliche (1934)
- Policing the Plains (1927)
- Polikushka (1922)
- Polina (2016)
- Polis (2014)
- Polis Evo (2015)
- Polis Evo 2 (2018)
- Polis Evo 3 (2023)
- Polis Is This: Charles Olson and the Persistence of Place (2007)
- Polish Blood (1934)
- The Polish Bride (1998)
- Polish Economy (1928)
- The Polish Marathon (1927)
- Polish-Russian War (2009)
- Polish Wedding (1998)
- Polite People (2011)
- Polite Society (2023)
- The Politician's Love Story (1909)
- Politicking in Paradise (unreleased)
- Politics (1931)
- The Polka King (2017)
- The Poll Diaries (2010)
- Polladhavan: (1980 & 2007)
- Pollock (2000)
- Polluting Paradise (2012)
- Polly (1989)
- Polly of the Circus: (1917 & 1932)
- Polly of the Follies (1922)
- Polly Me Love (1976)
- Polly of the Movies (1927)
- Polly Put the Kettle On (1917)
- Polly Redhead (1917)
- Polly of the Storm Country (1920)
- Polly With a Past (1920)
- Pollyanna: (1920 & 1960)
- Poltergay (2006)
- Poltergeist series:
  - Poltergeist: (1982 & 2015)
  - Poltergeist II: The Other Side (1986)
  - Poltergeist III (1988)
- Polvere di stelle (1973)
- Poly Styrene: I Am a Cliché (2021)
- Polyester (1981)
- Polygon (1977)
- The Polynin Case (1970)
- Polytechnic (2014)
- Polytechnique (2009)
- Polytehnitis kai erimospitis (1963)
- Pom Poko (1994)
- Pom Pom (1984)
- The Pom Pom Girls (1976)
- Pom Pom Strikes Back (1986)
- Pommy Arrives in Australia (1913)
- The Pompatus of Love (1999)
- Pompei (2019)
- Pompeii (2014)
- Pompey the Conqueror (1953)
- Poms (2019)

==== Pon–Poz ====
- Pond Life (2018)
- Ponette (1996)
- Le Pont du Nord (1981)
- Pontypool (2008)
- Pony Express (1953)
- The Pony Express: (1907 & 1925)
- Ponyboi (2024)
- Ponyo (2008)
- The Pooch (1932)
- The Pooch and the Pauper (2000 TV)
- The Poof Point (2001 TV)
- Pooh's Grand Adventure: The Search for Christopher Robin (1997)
- Pooh's Heffalump Movie (2005)
- Pooh's Heffalump Halloween Movie (2005)
- The Pool: (2007 & 2018)
- The Pool Boys (2011)
- The Pool Hustlers (1982)
- Pool of London (1951)
- Pool Sharks (1915)
- Poolhall Junkies (2003)
- Poolman (2023)
- The Poor Boob (1919)
- The Poor & Hungry (2000)
- The Poor Little Rich Girl (1917)
- The Poor Nut (1927)
- The Poor Rich (1934)
- The Poor Rich Man (1918)
- The Poor Simp (1920)
- Poor Things (2023)
- The Poot (2010)
- Pootie Tang (2001)
- Pop In Q (2016)
- Pop Skull (2007)
- The Pope's Exorcist (2023)
- The Pope of Greenwich Village (1984)
- The Pope Must Die (1991)
- The Pope's Toilet (2007)
- Popeye (1980)
- Popeye the Sailor Meets Ali Baba's Forty Thieves (1937)
- Popeye the Sailor Meets Sindbad the Sailor (1936)
- Poppy: (1917 & 1936)
- The Poppy Girl's Husband (1919)
- The Poppy Is Also a Flower (1966)
- Popstar: Never Stop Never Stopping (2016)
- The Popular Sin (1926)
- Population 436 (2006)
- The Porcelain Doll (2005)
- Porco Rosso (1992)
- Porgy and Bess (1959)
- Pork Chop Hill (1959)
- Porklips Now (1980)
- Porky's series:
  - Porky's (1981)
  - Porky's II: The Next Day (1983)
  - Porky's Revenge (1985)
  - Porky's Pimpin' Pee Wee (2009)
- Porky's Duck Hunt (1937)
- Pornmaking for Dummies (2007)
- The Pornographer (1999)
- The Pornographer (2001)
- The Pornographers (1966)
- Pornostar (1998)
- Port (1934)
- The Port (2019)
- The Port of 40 Thieves (1944)
- Port of Call: (1948 & 2015)
- The Port of Doom (1913)
- Port of Freedom (1944)
- The Port of Missing Girls: (1928 & 1938)
- The Port of Missing Men (1914)
- Port of New York (1949)
- Port of Shadows (1938)
- The Portal (2014)
- The Porter (2004)
- The Porter from Maxim's: (1927, 1933, 1939, 1953 & 1976)
- The Portico of Glory (1953)
- A Portrait of the Artist as a Young Man (1977)
- Portrait of a Beauty (2008)
- Portrait in Black (1960)
- Portrait of the Fighter as a Young Man (2010)
- Portrait of Jason (1967)
- Portrait of Jennie (1948)
- The Portrait of a Lady (1996)
- Portrait of a Lady on Fire (2019)
- Portrait Werner Herzog (1986)
- Ports of Call (1925)
- Pose (2025)
- Poseidon (2006)
- The Poseidon Adventure: (1972 & 2005 TV)
- Poser (2021)
- Positive: (1990, 2007 & 2008)
- Positive I.D. (1987)
- Positive: A Journey Into AIDS (1995)
- Possessed: (1931, 1947, 1983, 1999, 2000 TV & 2006)
- The Possessed: (1965, 1977 TV, 1988, 2009 & 2021)
- Possession: (1919, 1922, 1981, 2002 & 2009)
- The Possession (2012)
- The Possession of Hannah Grace (2018)
- The Possession of Joel Delaney (1972)
- The Possession of Michael King (2014)
- Possessor (2020)
- Possum (2018)
- The Post (2017)
- Post Grad (2009)
- Post Mortem: (1982, 1999, 2010 & 2020)
- Post Tenebras Lux (2012)
- Postal (2007)
- The Postcard Bandit (2003)
- The Postcard Killings (2020)
- Postcards from the Edge (1990)
- Poster Boy: Becoming Zyzz (2026)
- Il Postino: The Postman (1994)
- Postman: (1967 & 1995)
- The Postman (1997)
- The Postman Always Rings Twice: (1946 & 1981)
- Postman Pat: The Movie (2014)
- The Postman Strikes Back (1982)
- Postmen in the Mountains (1999)
- Il Posto (1961)
- Pot o' Gold (1941)
- Potiche (2010)
- The Poughkeepsie Tapes (2007)
- Poultrygeist: Night of the Chicken Dead (2008)
- Pound Puppies and the Legend of Big Paw (1988)
- Poupelle of Chimney Town (2020)
- The Pout-Pout Fish (2026)
- Powaqqatsi (1988)
- Powder (1995)
- Powder Blue (2009)
- Powder Burn (1999)
- Powder My Back (1928)
- Powder River (1953)
- Powder Room (2013)
- Powder Town (1942)
- Power: (1928, 1986, 2014 Kannada, 2014 Telugu & 2016)
- The Power: (1968 & 1984)
- Power 98 (1996)
- The Power Agent (2020)
- Power Ballad (2026)
- Power Cut (2012)
- Power Dive (1941)
- The Power of the Dog (2021)
- The Power of Kangwon Province (1998)
- Power Kids (2009)
- The Power and the Glory: (1933 & 1941)
- The Power of Myth (1988) (TV)
- The Power of One (1992)
- Power Over Men (1929)
- The Power of the Press (1928)
- Power of the Press (1948)
- The Powerpuff Girls Movie (2002)
- Power Rangers (2017)
- Powwow Highway (1989)
- Poymughangal (1973)
- Poznań '56 (1996)

=== Pr ===
==== Pra ====
- Praan Jaye Par Shaan Na Jaye (2003)
- Pranna: (2019 & 2022)
- Praanam (2003)
- Praavu (2023)
- Prabhu (1979)
- Prabhuvinte Makkal (2012)
- Practical Joke (1977)
- Practical Magic (1998)
- Practical Magic 2 (2026)
- Pradhan (2023)
- Prahalada (1939)
- Prahlada (1941)
- A Prairie Home Companion (2006)
- Praise (1998)
- Praise Band: The Movie (2008)
- Praise the Lord (2014)
- Praise This (2023)
- Prajapathi (2006)
- Prajapati (1993)
- Prakash (2022)
- Prakashan Parakkatte (2022)
- Prakriti Manohari (1980)
- Pralayam (1980)
- Pralayanthaka (1984)
- Prameelarjuneeyam (1965)
- Pranaam (2019)
- Pranam Khareedu (1978)
- Pranaya Meenukalude Kadal (2019)
- Pranaya Nilavu (1999)
- Pranaya Vilasam (2023)
- Pranayakadha (2014)
- Pranayakalam (2007)
- Prancer (1989)
- Prancer Returns (2001)
- The Prank (2022)
- Prasanna (1950)
- Pray for Death (1985)
- A Prayer Before Dawn (2017)
- Prayer of the Rollerboys (1991)
- Praying with Anger (1992)

==== Pre ====
- Preacher's Kid (2010)
- Preaching to the Choir (2006)
- The Preacher's Wife (1996)
- Preaching to the Perverted (1997)
- Precious (2009)
- Precious Cargo (2016)
- Precious Find (1996)
- Precious Images (1986)
- Precious Is the Night (2020)
- Precious Knowledge (2011)
- Precious Victims (1993) (TV)
- A Precocious Girl (1934)
- Predator series:
  - Predator (1987)
  - Predator 2 (1990)
  - Predators (2010)
  - The Predator (2018)
  - Prey (2022)
  - Predator: Killer of Killers (2025)
  - Predator: Badlands (2025)
- The Predators (2020)
- Predestination (2014)
- Predicament: (2008 & 2010)
- Prediction (1993)
- Predictions of Fire (1996)
- Preetam (2021)
- Preethi (1972)
- Preethi Geethi Ityaadi (2014)
- Preethi Hangama (2010)
- Preethi Madu Thamashe Nodu (1979)
- Preethi Prema Pranaya (2003)
- Preethi Vathsalya (1984)
- Preethigaagi (2007)
- Preethisi Nodu (1981)
- Preethiya Theru (2010)
- Preethiyalli Sahaja (2016)
- Preethiyinda (2015)
- Preethiyinda Ramesh (2010)
- Preethse (2000)
- Preethse Preethse (2009)
- Preethsod Thappa (1998)
- Preethsu Thappenilla (2000)
- Preeyasakhi Radha (1982)
- Prefontaine (1997)
- Prego (2015)
- Prehistoric Women: (1950 & 1967)
- Prejudice: (1949, 1988 & 2015)
- Prelude to a Kiss (1992)
- Prem Sanyas (1925)
- Premature: (2014 & 2019)
- Premature Burial (1962)
- Premium Rush (2012)
- Premonition: (2004 & 2007)
- Prem Parbat (1973)
- Preparation for the Next Life (2025)
- Preparations to Be Together for an Unknown Period of Time (2020)
- Preschool (2026)
- Presence (1992 & 2024)
- The Presence (2010)
- Preservation (2014)
- The President: (1928, 1961 & 2014)
- President McKinley Inauguration Footage (1901)
- The President's Analyst (1967)
- The President's Barber (2004)
- The President's Cake (2026)
- The President's Lady (1953)
- The President's Last Bang (2005)
- The President's Mystery (1936)
- The Presidio (1988)
- Pressure: (1976, 2002, 2015 & 2026)
- The Prestige (2006)
- Presumed Innocent (1990)
- Pretend You Don't See Her (2002) (TV)
- Pretty Baby: (1950 & 1978)
- Pretty Lethal (2026)
- Pretty Persuasion (2006)
- Pretty in Pink (1986)
- Pretty Poison (1968)
- Pretty Thing (2025)
- Pretty Village, Pretty Flame (1996)
- Pretty Woman (1990)
- Prey: (1977, 2007, 2009, 2019 American, 2019 Canadian, 2021 & 2022)
- The Prey: (1921, 1974, 1983 & 2011)
- Prey for the Devil (2022)
- Prey for Rock & Roll (2003)

==== Pri ====
- The Price: (1924 & 2017)
- A Price Above Rubies (1998)
- The Price of Fame: (1916 & 2014)
- The Price of Milk (2000)
- The Price of Power (1969)
- Priceless: (2006 & 2016)
- Prick Up Your Ears (1987)
- Pride: (1917, 1938, 1955, 1998, 2004, 2007 & 2014)
- Pride of the Bowery (1941)
- Pride Divide (1997)
- Pride and Glory (2008)
- The Pride and the Passion (1957)
- Pride and Prejudice: (1940, 2003 & 2005)
- Pride and Prejudice and Zombies (2016)
- The Pride of the Yankees (1942)
- Priest: (1994 & 2011)
- Priest of Love (1981)
- The Priests (2015)
- Primal Fear (1996)
- Primary Colors (1998)
- Primate (2026)
- Prime (2005)
- Prime Cut (1972)
- The Prime of Miss Jean Brodie (1969)
- Prime Time (2008 & 2021)
- Primer (2004)
- Primetime (2026)
- Primitive War (2025)
- The Primrose Ring (1917)
- The Prince: (1996, 2014 & 2019)
- Prince of Central Park (2000)
- Prince of the City (1981)
- Prince of Darkness (1987)
- The Prince of Egypt (1998)
- Prince of Jutland (1994)
- The Prince & Me (2004)
- The Prince & Me 2: The Royal Wedding (2006)
- The Prince & Me: A Royal Honeymoon (2008)
- The Prince & Me: The Elephant Adventure (2010)
- The Prince and the Pauper: (1915, 1920, 1937, 1977, 1990 & 2000)
- Prince of Persia: The Sands of Time (2010)
- The Prince and the Showgirl (1957)
- Prince of Space (1959)
- The Prince of Thieves (1948)
- The Prince of Tides (1991)
- Prince Valiant: (1954 & 1997)
- Prince Vladimir (2006)
- Princesa (2001)
- Princesas (2005)
- Princess: (2006, 2008 TV, 2010 & 2014)
- The Princess: (1966, 1983, 2022 action & 2022 documentary)
- The Princess Bride (1987)
- Princess Caraboo (1994)
- The Princess Comes Across (1936)
- Princess Cyd (2017)
- The Princess Diaries (2001)
- The Princess Diaries 2: Royal Engagement (2004)
- The Princess and the Frog (2009)
- The Princess and the Goblin (1991)
- Princess Iron Fan: (1941 & 1966)
- Princess Mononoke (1999)
- The Princess Switch series:
  - The Princess Switch (2018)
  - The Princess Switch: Switched Again (2020)
  - The Princess Switch 3: Romancing the Star (2021)
- The Princess and the Warrior (2000)
- The Principal (1987)
- El Principio de Arquímedes (2004)
- PriPara Minna no Akogare Let's Go PriPari (2016)
- Prison: (1949 & 1987)
- The Prison (2017)
- Prisoner of Honor (1991) (TV)
- The Prisoner of Second Avenue (1975)
- Prisoner of War: (1954 & 2025)
- The Prisoner of Zenda: (1937 & 1952)
- Prisoners: (1929, 1982 & 2013)
- Prisoners of the Ghostland (2021)
- Prisoners of Love: (1921 & 1954)
- Prisoners of the Storm (1926)
- La Prisonnière (1968)
- Private (2004)
- Private Benjamin (1980)
- Private Confessions (1996)
- Private Desert (2021)
- Private Detective (1939)
- Private Eye (2009)
- The Private Eye Blues (1994)
- The Private Eyes: (1976 & 1980)
- Private Fears in Public Places (2006)
- A Private Function (1984)
- Private Hell 36 (1954)
- Private Lessons: (1975, 1981 & 2008)
- The Private Life of Helen of Troy (1927)
- The Private Life of Henry VIII (1933)
- The Private Life of Sherlock Holmes (1970)
- The Private Lives of Elizabeth and Essex (1939)
- The Private Lives of Pippa Lee (2009)
- A Private Matter (1992)
- Private Parts: (1972 & 1997)
- Private Property: (1960 & 2006)
- Private Resort (1985)
- Private School (1983)
- Private Valentine: Blonde & Dangerous (2008)
- Private Vices, Public Pleasures (1976)
- Private's Progress (1956)
- Priyamana Thozhi (2003)
- Priyotoma (2023)
- The Prize: (1950, 1963 & 2011)
- The Prize Winner of Defiance, Ohio (2005)
- The Prizefighter and the Lady (1933)
- Prizzi's Honor (1985)

==== Pro ====
- Pro and Con (1993)
- Pro peníze (1912)
- Probably Love (2001)
- Probation (1932)
- Probation (1960)
- Probe (1972) (TV)
- Probes in Space (1975)
- Probhu Nosto Hoi Jai (2007)
- Problem Child series:
  - Problem Child (1990)
  - Problem Child 2 (1991)
  - Problem Child 3: Junior in Love (1995) (TV)
- A Problem with Fear (2003)
- Problem Girls (1953)
- Procedure 769, Witness to an Execution (1995)
- Procès de Jeanne d'Arc (1962)
- Proceso a la conciencia (1964)
- Proceso a la infamia (1978)
- Process (2004)
- Procession (2021)
- Processo per direttissima (1974)
- Procter (2002)
- Prodaná nevěsta (1975)
- Prodigal Daughters (1923)
- Prodigal Sons (2008)
- The Producers: (1968 & 2005)
- Productivity and Performance by Alex K. (1984)
- Proezas de Satanás na Vila de Leva e Tráz (1967)
- Profane (2011)
- A Professional Gun (1968)
- Professional Suspects (1966)
- The Professionals (1966)
- Le Professionnel (1981)
- Professor: (1962 & 1972)
- The Professor: (1919 & 2018)
- Professor Bean's Removal (1913)
- Professor Beware (1938)
- Professor Creeps (1942)
- Professor Dowell's Testament (1984)
- Professor Hannibal (1956)
- Professor Huchuraya (1974)
- Professor Imhof (1926)
- Professor Ki Padosan (1993)
- Professor Kosta Vujic's Hat (2012)
- Professor Kranz tedesco di Germania (1978)
- Professor Larousse (1920)
- The Professor and the Madman (2019)
- Professor Mamlock (1938)
- Professor Mamlock (1961)
- Professor Marston and the Wonder Women (2017)
- Professor, My Son (1946)
- Professor Nachtfalter (1951)
- Professor Pepper's School of Good Stuff (2006) (TV)
- Professor Popper's Problem (1975)
- Professor Pyarelal (1981)
- Professor Shonku O El Dorado (2019)
- Profile: (1954 & 2018)
- Profile in Anger (1984)
- The Profit (2001)
- Profit and the Loss (1917)
- Profit from Loss (1915)
- Profound Desires of the Gods (1968)
- The Program (1993)
- Project A (1983)
- Project Grizzly (1996)
- Project Hail Mary (2026)
- Project Makeover (2007)
- Project A Part II (1987)
- Project Power (2020)
- Project Wolf Hunting (2022)
- Project X: (1987 & 2012)
- The Projected Man (1966)
- The Projectionist: (1970 & 2019)
- Prom (2011)
- The Prom (2020)
- Prom Night series:
  - Prom Night: (1980 & 2008)
  - Hello Mary Lou: Prom Night II (1987)
  - Prom Night III: The Last Kiss (1990)
  - Prom Night IV: Deliver Us from Evil (1991)
- Prom Queen: The Marc Hall Story (2004) (TV)
- Prometheus: (1998 & 2012)
- The Promise: (1979, 1995, 1996, 2005, 2007 & 2016)
- Promised Land: (1987, 2002 & 2012)
- The Promised Land: (1925, 1973, 1975, 1986, 2015, & 2023)
- Promising Young Woman (2020)
- Proof: (1991 & 2005)
- Proof of Life (2000)
- Proof of the Man (1977)
- The Proof of the Man (1913)
- Prophecies of Nostradamus (1974)
- Prophecy (1979)
- The Prophecy series:
  - The Prophecy (1995)
  - The Prophecy II (1998)
  - The Prophecy 3: The Ascent (2000)
  - The Prophecy: Uprising (2005)
  - The Prophecy: Forsaken (2005)
- A Prophet (2009)
- The Proposal: (1957 & 2009)
- À propos de Nice (1930)
- The Proposition: (1998 & 2005)
- Prospero's Books (1991)
- Protected (1975)
- Protection: (1929 & 2001)
- Protector (2009)
- The Protector: (1985 & 2005)
- Protocol (1984)
- The Proud Family Movie (2005)
- The Proud Valley (1940)
- Providence (1977)
- Provoking Laughter (2016)
- The Prowler: (1951 & 1981)
- Proxima (2019)
- Prozac Nation (2003)

==== Pru–Prz ====
- The Prude (1986)
- The Prude's Fall (1925)
- The Pruitt-Igoe Myth (2011)
- Prunella (1918)
- The Prussian Cur (1918)
- A Prussian Love Story (1938)
- The Prussian Spy (1909)
- Pruthviraj (1992)
- Prvi splitski odred (1972)
- První parta (1959)
- Pryamoy efir (2023)
- Prymas – trzy lata z tysiąca (2000)
- Przeklęte oko proroka (1984)
- Przhevalsky (1951)
- Przygoda z piosenką (1969)

=== Ps–Pw ===
- Pseudo (2020)
- Pseudo: Blood of Our Own (2012)
- Psique y sexo (1965)
- Psych series:
  - Psych: The Movie (2017)
  - Psych 2: Lassie Come Home (2020)
  - Psych 3: This Is Gus (2021)
- Psych 9 (2010)
- Psych Siddhartha (2026)
- Psych-Out (1968)
- Psyche 59 (1964)
- Psychedelia (2015)
- The Psychedelic Priest (2001)
- Psychedelic Sexualis (1965)
- Psychic Killer (1975)
- Psycho series:
  - Psycho: (1960 & 1998)
  - Psycho II (1983)
  - Psycho III (1986)
  - Psycho IV: The Beginning (1990 TV)
- Psycho (2008)
- Psycho (2013)
- Psycho (2020)
- Psycho A-Go-Go (1965)
- Psycho Beach Party (2000)
- Psycho Cop (1989)
- Psycho Cop 2 (1993)
- Psycho Girls (1986)
- Psycho Killer (2026)
- The Psycho Legacy (2010)
- Psycho from Texas (1975)
- Psycho Therapy: The Shallow Tale of a Writer Who Decided to Write About a Serial Killer (2024)
- Psycho-Pass series:
  - Psycho-Pass: The Movie (2015)
  - Psycho-Pass 3: First Inspector (2020)
  - Psycho-Pass Providence (2023)
- Psychokinesis (2018)
- Psychomania (1973)
- Psychonaut (2024)
- Psychopath (1968)
- The Psychopath (1966)
- The Psychopath (1973)
- Psychopathia Sexualis (2006)
- Psychopaths (2017)
- Psychophony: An Experiment in Evil (2012)
- Psychos in Love (1987)
- Psychosis (2010)
- Psychosis in Stockholm (2020)
- The Psychotronic Man (1979)
- Psychotropica (2009)
- Psychout for Murder (1969)
- Psycosissimo (1961)
- PT 109 (1963)
- Pterodactyl (2005)
- Pterodactyl Woman from Beverly Hills (1996)
- PTU (2003)
- Puaada (2021)
- Pubescence (2011)
- Pubescence 3 (2012)
- The Public (2018)
- Public Access (1993)
- Public Enemies: (1941, 1996 & 2009)
- The Public Enemy (1931)
- Public Enemy (2002)
- Public Enemy Number One (2019)
- The Public Eye (1992)
- The Pudding Thieves (1967)
- Puddle Cruiser (1996)
- Puff and the Incredible Mr. Nobody (1982 TV)
- Puff the Magic Dragon (1978 TV)
- Puff the Magic Dragon in the Land of the Living Lies (1979 TV)
- Puff, Puff, Pass (2006)
- The Puffy Chair (2007)
- Pufnstuf (1970)
- Pulgasari (1986)
- Pulp: (1972 & 2012)
- Pulp Fiction (1994)
- Pulse: (1988, 1995, 2001 & 2006)
- Pump Up the Volume (1990)
- Pumping Iron (1977)
- Pumpkin (2002)
- The Pumpkin Eater (1964)
- Pumpkinhead series:
  - Pumpkinhead (1988)
  - Pumpkinhead II: Blood Wings (1994)
  - Pumpkinhead: Ashes to Ashes (2006 TV)
  - Pumpkinhead: Blood Feud (2007 TV)
- The Punch Bowl (1944)
- The Punch and Judy Man (1962)
- Punch Drunks (1934)
- Punch-Drunk Love (2002)
- Punchline (1988)
- Punguna (1926)
- The Punisher series:
  - The Punisher: (1989 & 2004)
  - The Punisher: Dirty Laundry (2012)
  - Punisher: War Zone (2007)
- Punishment Park (1971)
- The Punk Rock Movie (1977)
- Punk's Dead (2016)
- Puppet Master series:
  - Puppet Master (1989)
  - Puppet Master II (1991)
  - Puppet Master III: Toulon's Revenge (1991)
  - Puppet Master 4 (1993)
  - Puppet Master 5: The Final Chapter (1994)
  - Curse of the Puppet Master (1998)
  - Retro Puppet Master (1999)
  - Puppet Master: The Legacy (2003)
  - Puppet Master vs Demonic Toys (2004)
  - Puppet Master: Axis of Evil (2010)
  - Puppet Master X: Axis Rising (2012)
  - Puppet Master: Axis Termination (2017)
  - Puppet Master: The Littlest Reich (2018)
  - Puppet Master: Doktor Death (2022)
- The Puppet Masters (1994)
- The Puppetmaster (1993)
- The Puppetoon Movie (1987)
- Purana Mandir (1984)
- Pure: (2002, 2005 & 2010)
- Pure Coolness (2007)
- Pure Country (1992)
- Pure Country: Pure Heart (2017)
- Pure Country 2: The Gift (2010)
- A Pure Formality (1994)
- The Pure Hell of St Trinian's (1960)
- Pure Love (2016)
- Pure Luck (1991)
- Purgatory: (1999 TV & 2007)
- The Purge series:
  - The Purge (2013)
  - The Purge: Anarchy (2014)
  - The Purge: Election Year (2016)
  - The First Purge (2018)
  - The Forever Purge (2021)
- Puritan Passions (1923)
- Purple Butterfly (2003)
- Purple Noon (1960)
- Purple Rain (1984)
- The Purple Rose of Cairo (1985)
- Purple Sunset (2001)
- Pursued: (1925, 1934 & 1947)
- Pursuit to Algiers (1945)
- The Pursuit of D. B. Cooper (1981)
- The Pursuit of Happyness (2006)
- Pusaka (2019)
- Push (2009)
- Pusher series:
  - Pusher: (1996 & 2012)
  - Pusher II (2004)
  - Pusher III (2005)
- Pushing Hands (1991)
- Pushing Tin (1999)
- Pushkin: The Last Duel (2006)
- Pushpaka Vimana (1988)
- Puss in Boots: (1922, 1961, 1969, 1988, 1999 & 2011)
- Puss in Boots: The Last Wish (2022)
- Putney Swope (1969)
- Puttin' On the Ritz (1930)
- Putty Hill (2010)
- Puzzle: (1974, 2006, 2010 & 2014)
- Puzzle of a Downfall Child (1970)
- The Puzzling Challenge Letter of the Mysterious Thief Dorapan (1997)
- Pwera Usog (2017)

=== Py ===
==== Pya ====
- Pyaar Diwana (1972)
- Pyaar Diwana Hota Hai (2002)
- Pyaar Hai Toh Hai (2023)
- Pyaar Impossible! (2010)
- Pyaar Ishq Aur Mohabbat (2001)
- Pyaar Ka Mandir (1988)
- Pyaar Ka Punchnama (2011)
- Pyaar Ka Punchnama 2 (2015)
- Pyaar Ka Rishta (1973)
- Pyaar Ka Saagar (1961)
- Pyaar Ka Saaya (1991)
- Pyaar Ka Tarana (1993)
- Pyaar Kahani (2019)
- Pyaar Karke Dekho (1987)
- Pyaar Ke Do Pal (1986)
- Pyaar Ke Side Effects (2006)
- Pyaar Kiya Nahin Jaatha (2003)
- Pyaar Kiya To Darna Kya (1963)
- Pyaar Kiya To Darna Kya (1998)
- Pyaar Koi Khel Nahin (1999)
- Pyaar Mein Kabhi Kabhi (1999)
- Pyaar Mein Twist (2005)
- Pyaar Mohabbat (1988)
- Pyaar Prema Kaadhal (2018)
- Pyaar To Hona Hi Tha (1998)
- Pyaar Tune Kya Kiya (2001)
- Pyaar Vali Love Story (2014)
- Pyaar Zindagi Hai (2001)
- Pyaara Dushman (1980)
- Pyaasa (1957)
- Pyaasa (2002)
- Pyar Hi Pyar (1969)
- Pyar Hi Pyar Mein (2003)
- Pyar Hua Chori Chori (1991)
- Pyar Jhukta Nahin (1985)
- Pyar Ka Devta (1991)
- Pyar Ka Karz (1990)
- Pyar Ka Live Show (2014)
- Pyar Ka Mausam (1969)
- Pyar Ka Rog (1994)
- Pyar Ka Sapna (1969)
- Pyar Ka Taraana (1993)

==== Pye–Pyx ====
- Pyewacket (2017)
- The Pyjama Girl Case (1977)
- The Pyjama Girl Murder Case (1939)
- Pyjamas Preferred (1932)
- Pygmalion: (1935, 1937, 1938, 1948 & 1983)
- Pygmalion and Galatea (1898)
- Pygmy Island (1950)
- Pyin Ma Ngote To (1981)
- Pyongyang Nalpharam (2006)
- The Pyramid (2014)
- The Pyramid of the Sun God (1965)
- The PyraMMMid (2011)
- Pyre (2024)
- Pyro... The Thing Without a Face (1964)
- Pyrokinesis (2000)
- Pyromaniac (2016)
- A Pyromaniac's Love Story (1995)
- Python (2000 TV)
- The Pythons (1979)
- Pythons 2 (2002 TV)
- The Pyx (1973)

Previous: List of films: N–O Next: List of films: Q–R

== See also ==
- Lists of films
- Lists of actors
- List of film and television directors
- List of documentary films
- List of film production companies
