= The Girl (2014 film) =

- Film poster
- Traditional Chinese: 校花駕到之極品校花
- Simplified Chinese: 校花驾到之极品校花
- Hanyu Pinyin: Xiàohuā Jiàdào Zhī Jípǐn Xiàohuā
- Directed by: Guan Xiaojie; Niu Dong; Ma Donghua
- Written by: Zhang Miao; Wang Siyu
- Produced by: Chen Huanzhang; Huang Jianan; Chen Hui
- Starring: Zhao Yihuan; Leon Jay Williams; Jiang Chao; Wen Mengyang
- Cinematography: Peng Qiyang
- Production companies: Times Films; Shiningstar
- Distributed by: Times Films
- Release date: 24 November 2014 (China)
- Running time: 109 minutes
- Country: China
- Language: Mandarin

The Girl is a 2014 Chinese romantic comedy film directed by Guan Xiaojie, Niu Dong, and Ma Donghua, starring Zhao Yihuan, Leon Jay Williams, Jo Jiang, and Wen Mengyang. The film was released in China on 24 November 2014.

== Cast ==
- Zhao Yihuan as Ai Meili
- Leon Jay Williams as Lin Yixuan
- Jiang Chao as Yu Haoran
- Wen Mengyang as Anni Miduo

== Music ==
- Zhao Yihuan - "Shayang" (Chinese:傻样)
