= Pubescence 3 =

2012 film by Guan Xiaojie

- Film poster
- Traditional Chinese: 青春期3：遊戲青春
- Simplified Chinese: 青春期3：游戏青春
- Hanyu Pinyin: Qīngchūnqī: Yóuxì Qīngchūn
- Directed by: Guan Xiaojie
- Written by: Guan Xiaojie
- Produced by: Gu Fangfang; Wei Ming; Wang Helin
- Starring: Zhao Yihuan; Wang Yi
- Cinematography: Peng Qiyang
- Edited by: Xu Yangdong
- Music by: Chenhuang Yi'nan
- Production company: GEABIES
- Release date: 15 May 2012 (China)
- Running time: 90 minutes
- Country: China
- Language: Mandarin

Pubescence 3 is a 2012 Chinese teen sex comedy film and a sequel to Pubescence and Paradise Lost as part of the Pubescence theatrical series. It was directed and written by Guan Xiaojie, starring Zhao Yihuan and Wang Yi. The film was released in China on 15 May 2012.

== Cast ==
- Zhao Yihuan as Cheng Xiaoyu.
- Wang Yi as Wang Xiaofei.
- Yang Feifan as Feifan.
- Li Luqian as Yang Qian.
- Xie Jin as Su Zi.
- Qiu Xiaochan as Ni Ni.
- You Yitian as Yitian.
- Liang Tingyu as Liangzi.
- Wang Mengting as Chanel.
- Qin Hanlei as the instructor.
- Cheng Zicheng as Ajian.
- Guo Jiawei as Lizi.

== Soundtrack ==
- You Yiyian - "If Not You"
- Liu Yixun - "After Rain"
- A Qing - "Hourglass"
- Zhang Yuanyuan - "To Our Youth"
