= Struggle (2013 film) =

- Film poster
- Traditional Chinese: 上位
- Simplified Chinese: 上位
- Hanyu Pinyin: Shàngweì
- Directed by: Guan Xiaojie
- Written by: Guan Xiaojie
- Produced by: Gu Fangfang; Wang Helin; Zhu Wenting; Wang Zi
- Starring: Zhao Yihuan; Wen Zhuo; Hu Yue; Wen Mengyang; You Yitian; Ruo Qi
- Cinematography: Zhong Shuo
- Edited by: He Jianyu
- Music by: Lü Liusheng
- Production companies: GEABIES; Bale; Beijing Youyuan Film and Television Company
- Release date: 28 February 2013 (China)
- Running time: 93 minutes
- Country: China
- Language: Mandarin
- Box office: ¥200 million

Struggle is a 2013 Chinese teen film directed and written by Guan Xiaojie, starring Zhao Yihuan, Wen Zhuo, Hu Yue, Wen Mengyang, You Yitian, and Ruo Qi. Within a month the film grossed ¥200 million in China.

== Cast ==
- Zhao Yihuan as Li Ruoxi
- Wen Zhuo as Wen Feng
- Wen Mengyang as Qiao Zi
- Hu Yue as Mengmeng
- You Yitian as Siqi
- Ruo Qi as Sister CICI
- Qin Hanlei as Qin Shou
- Li Hongtao as the deputy director
- Yin Zhe as Sister Mimi

== Production ==
This film was shot in Beijing Xingmei Jinchen Studios.

== Music ==
- You Yitian - "One Day"
- Zhang Yuanyuan - "The One Which You Were In The Past"
- Zhao Yihuan - "Eidolon Wonderland"
