= Women's Enemy =

- Traditional Chinese: 女人公敵
- Simplified Chinese: 女人公敌
- Hanyu Pinyin: Nǚrén Gōngdí
- Directed by: Guan Xiaojie
- Written by: Guan Xiaojie
- Produced by: Wang Helin; Zhu Wenting
- Starring: Zhao Yihuan; Wen Zhuo; Chen Ou; Liu Huipu; Qiu Xiaochan; Wang Mengting; Wen Mengyang
- Cinematography: Liu Yin
- Edited by: Chen Jianjiang; Yu Yao
- Music by: Chenhuang Yinan
- Production companies: GEABIES; Jumei Youpin
- Release date: 17 June 2013 (China)
- Running time: 120 minutes
- Country: China
- Language: Mandarin

Women's Enemy is a 2013 Chinese inspirational film directed and written by Guan Xiaojie, starring Zhao Yihuan, Wen Zhuo, Chen Ou, Liu Huipu, Qiu Xiaochan, Wang Mengting, and Wen Mengyang.

== Cast ==
- Zhao Yihuan as Sun Xiaomei
- Wen Zhuo as Tian Kai
- Chen Ou as President Chen
- Liu Huipu as He Shuai
- Qiu Xiaochan as Xiao Chan
- Wang Mengting as Ma Qiao
- Wen Mengyang as Mu Yan

== Music ==
- Xiao Fei - "Give Me A Little Courage"
