= The Cabin Crew =

- Traditional Chinese: 後備空姐
- Simplified Chinese: 后备空姐
- Hanyu Pinyin: Hoùbeì Kōngjiě
- Directed by: Guan Xiaojie
- Written by: Guan Xiaojie
- Produced by: Huang Jianan; Gao Munan; Chen Huanzhang
- Starring: Zhao Yihuan; Liu Yuting; Qin Hanlei; Wen Zhuo
- Cinematography: Zhao Ming
- Edited by: He Jianyu
- Music by: Chenhuang Yinan
- Production company: IFG
- Distributed by: IFG
- Release date: 1 May 2014 (China)
- Running time: 107 minutes
- Country: China
- Language: Mandarin

The Cabin Crew is a 2014 Chinese inspirational film directed and written by Guan Xiaojie, starring Zhao Yihuan, Wen Zhuo, Liu Yuting, and Qin Hanlei. The film was released in China on International Workers' Day.

== Cast ==
- Zhao Yihuan as Zhao Xiaofan
- Wen Zhuo as Yu Zhi
- Liu Yuting as Liu Zhengzheng
- Qin Hanlei as Wei Junzhi
- Zou Yang as Tang Guo
- Kingdom Yuen as Teacher Yuen
- Li Manyi as President Lingyan
- Teddy Chin as Chen Xueyou
- Jiang Shan as Senior
- Xie Jiayu as Jiali
- Ma Sise as Taozi
- Gu Yue as Xiao Xiena
- Yin Zhe as Jin Mimi
- Huang Zhenyan as Huimei
- Steve Yap as the plane captain
- Tani Lin as a stewardess
- Christina Tseng as a stewardess
- Cathy Shyu as a stewardess
- Candy Chen as a stewardess

== Production ==
Filming took place in Kota Kinabalu and Shanghai.
