= The Supernatural Events on Campus =

- Film poster
- Traditional Chinese: 校花詭異事件
- Simplified Chinese: 校花诡异事件
- Hanyu Pinyin: Xiàohuā Guǐyì Shìjiàn
- Directed by: Guan Er
- Written by: Liang Xiaoxiao; Zhu Bo
- Produced by: Liu Hong; Chen Qing; Liao Libin
- Starring: Zhao Yihuan; Wang Yi; Li Manyi; Zhai Wenbin; Kong Qianqian
- Cinematography: Li Hongjian; Zhang Wenchao
- Edited by: Hao Zhengda
- Music by: Yang Bing; Qu Peng
- Production company: Beijing Zexi Niandai Film Company
- Distributed by: Huaxia Film Distribution Co., LTD; Beijing Zexi Niandai Film Company
- Release date: 12 July 2013 (China)
- Running time: 102 minutes
- Country: China
- Language: Mandarin

The Supernatural Events on Campus is a 2013 Chinese thriller horror film directed by Guan Er and written by Liang Xiaoxiao and Zhu Bo, and stars Zhao Yihuan, Wang Yi, Li Manyi, Zhai Wenbin, and Kong Qianqian. It based on the novel of the same name by Lan Ze. The film was released in China on 12 July 2013.

== Cast ==
- Zhao Yihuan as Su Su, the most beautiful school beauty of Huaxi College.
- Wang Yi as Lin Feng, Su Su's classmate and first lover.
- Li Manyi as Sister An.
- Zhai Wenbin as Yang Dong.
- Kong Qianqian as Lu Miao, one of the school beauty of Huaxi College.
- Li Sa as the boss/doctor.
- Chen Meihang as Li Shujia.
- Zheng Huixin as Tuantuan.
- Fu Yuhan as Haohao.
- Yang Li as Tuantuan's mother.
- Bai Lihui as Tuantuan's father.
- Liao Libin as Su Su's father.
- Wang Ruli as Su Su's mother.
- Mo Xi'er as the broadcaster.

== Music ==
- Zhao Yihuan - "The Past That Can't Go Back"

== Accolades ==
Award	Subject	Nominee	Result
3rd Beijing International Film Festival	Best New Film	The Supernatural Events on Campus	Nominated
