= Zhao Yihuan =

Chinese actress and model

- Born: 29 October 1987 (age 38); Jilin City, Jilin, China
- Education: Shanghai Normal University
- Occupations: Actress, model
- Years active: 2011-present

Chinese name
- Traditional Chinese: 趙奕歡
- Simplified Chinese: 赵奕欢
Transcriptions
Standard Mandarin
- Hanyu Pinyin: Zhào Yìhuān
- Musical career
- Also known as: Chloe Zhao
- Genres: Mandapop

Zhao Yihuan (born 29 October 1987), also known as Chloe Zhao, is a Chinese actress and model.

== Early life and education ==
Zhao graduated from Shanghai Normal University in 2011. She currently lives in Shanghai with her family.

== Filmography ==
=== Film ===
Year	English title	Chinese title	Role	Notes
2011	Pubescence	青春期	Cheng Xiaoyu	
2011	Paradise Lost	青春失乐园	Cheng Xiaoyu	
2012	Pubescence 3	青春期3	Cheng Xiaoyu	
2013	Struggle	上位	Li Ruoxi	
2013	Women's Enemy	女人公敌	Sun Xiaomei	
2013	The Supernatural Events on Campus	校花诡异事件	Su Su	
2013	Love Story	爱爱囧事	Cao Aiai	
2014	The Cabin Crew	后备空姐	Zhao Xiaofan	
2014	The Girl	校花驾到之极品校花	Ai Meili	
2015	The Queens	我是女王		
2015	Made Love in the Office	一路向前		
2016	708090	708090之深圳恋歌	Lin Meiqing	
2017	Mr. Frog and Miss Piggy	猫先生与猪小姐		
2018	Struggle 2			
2018	Raging Flower			
2019	Luftmensch			

=== Television ===
Year	English title	Chinese title	Role	Notes
2010	New Life Explosion	新生活大爆炸	Su Meiyan	
2011	Tiantian 2008	天天2088	A Xiang	
2013	Never Give Up Dodo	钱多多炼爱记		
2014		包笑公堂	Zhan Zhaozhao	
2014		来自星星的继承者们	Herself	
2016		校花前传之很纯很暧昧	Chen Meng Yan	
2017	Dear Prince	亲爱的王子大人	Su Yuanqing	
2019	The Brightest Star in the Sky	夜空中最闪亮的星	Ma Lina	
2021	Miss Crow with Mr. Lizard	烏鴉小姐與蜥蜴先生	Zhao Yan	

=== Others ===
- Dirty King (邋遢大王)
- Yi Dong Ji Huan (一动即欢)
- Xu Dong Cartoon (炫动卡通)
