= Love Story (2013 film) =

2013 film by Guan Er

- Traditional Chinese: 愛愛囧事
- Simplified Chinese: 爱爱囧事
- Hanyu Pinyin: Aìaì Jiǒngshì
- Directed by: Guan Er
- Written by: Liang Xiaoxiao; Zhu Bo
- Produced by: Liu Hong; Chen Qing; Liao Libin
- Starring: Zhao Yihuan; Wang Yi; Mo Xi'er
- Cinematography: Li Hongjian
- Production companies: Beijing Zexi Niandai Film Company; Zhuhai Shiji Hengxing Technology Co. Ltd; Hong Kong Aixing Film Media Co. Ltd.
- Distributed by: Huaxia Film Distribution Co., Ltd. Beijing Jindian Film Co., Ltd. Beijing Zexi Niandai Film Company
- Release date: 2 August 2013 (China)
- Running time: 97 minutes
- Country: China
- Language: Mandarin

Love Story is a 2013 Chinese romantic comedy film directed by Guan Er and written by Liang Xiaoxiao and Zhu Bo, and stars Zhao Yihuan, Wang Yi, and Mo Xi'er. The film was released in China on 2 August 2013.

== Cast ==
- Zhao Yihuan as Cao Aiai
- Wang Yi as Zhan Shao'ang
- Mo Xi'er as Su Man
- Chen Meihang as Hu Jingjing
- Qin Hanlei as Detective Qin
- Dong Yufeng as Yan Lang
- You Yitian as Duan Bailu
- Zhao Yujing as Fei Lengcui

== Music ==
- Zhao Yihuan - "Falling In Love"
- Zhao Yihuan - "Love"
- Zhao Yihuan - "Men Don't Credible"

== Accolades ==
Award	Subject	Nominee	Result
3rd Beijing International Film Festival	Best New Film	Love Story	Nominated
