= Pin Pon (2003 film) =

Pin Pon පිං පොං
- Directed by: Sudesh Wasantha Peiris
- Written by: Sunil Soma Peiris
- Produced by: Sunil T Films
- Starring: Ravindra Yasas; Kasun Chamara
- Cinematography: M.H. Gafoor
- Edited by: Kumarasiri de Silva
- Music by: Somapala Ratnayake
- Production company: Dil Process Lab
- Release date: 1 January 2003
- Country: Sri Lanka
- Language: Sinhala

Pin Pon (Sinhala: පිං පොං) is a 2003 Sri Lankan Sinhala children's thriller film directed by Sudesh Wasantha Peiris and produced by Sunil T Fernando for Sunil T Films. It stars Ravindra Yasas and his son Kasun Chamara in lead roles along with many foreign artistes. Music composed by Somapala Ratnayake. It is the 999th Sri Lankan film in the Sinhala cinema.

== Cast ==
- Ravindra Yasas as Francis
- Kasun Chamara as Udara
- Neetha Subhash Lale as Udara's mother
- Maneesha Begham
- Vijaya Kar as Sanjeewa
- Sakeer Hossain
- Piyathilaka Atapattu
- Sisira Kumaratunga
- Macaque as Pin Pon
