= Pet Fooled =

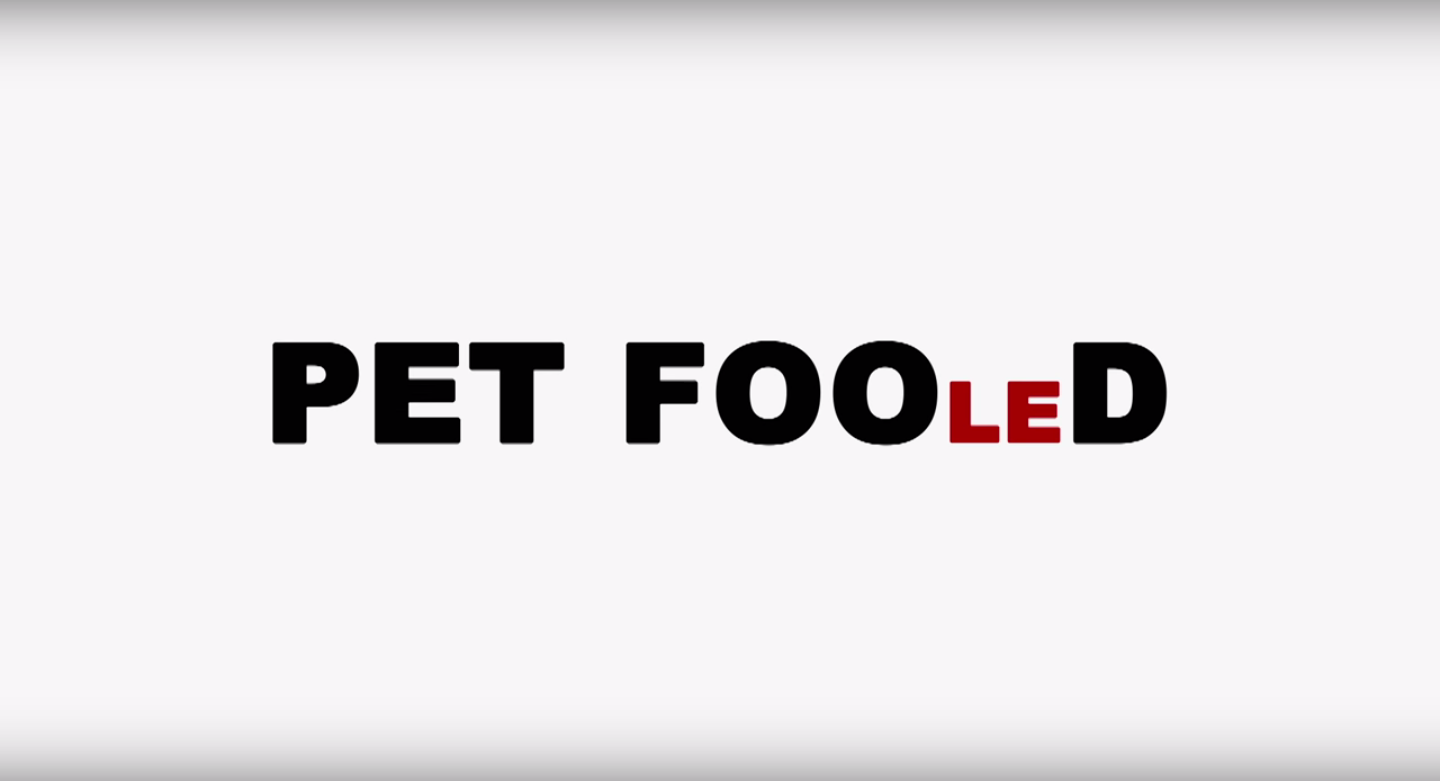
- Directed by: Kohl Harrington
- Produced by: Michael Fossat
- Cinematography: Josh Gibson
- Edited by: Shannon Schnittker
- Music by: Fernando Arroyo Lascurain
- Distributed by: Gravitas Ventures
- Release dates: 2 October 2016 (Catalina Film Festival); 10 January 2017 (VOD release)
- Running time: 70 minutes
- Language: English

Pet Fooled (stylized PET FOOLED) is a 2016 American independent documentary film exploring the pet food industry with interviews from veterinarians and pet owners whose pets died, they allege, due to commercial packaged pet food. After premiering at the Catalina Film Festival on 2 October 2016, the film had an "on demand theatrical run" via Gathr, after which it became available on VOD platforms on 10 January 2017. The film is currently available to Netflix subscribers, as a digital download on iTunes or as a physical DVD via Amazon. The film, produced by Myla Films and directed/narrated by Kohl Harrington, was distributed by Gravitas Ventures.

== Synopsis ==
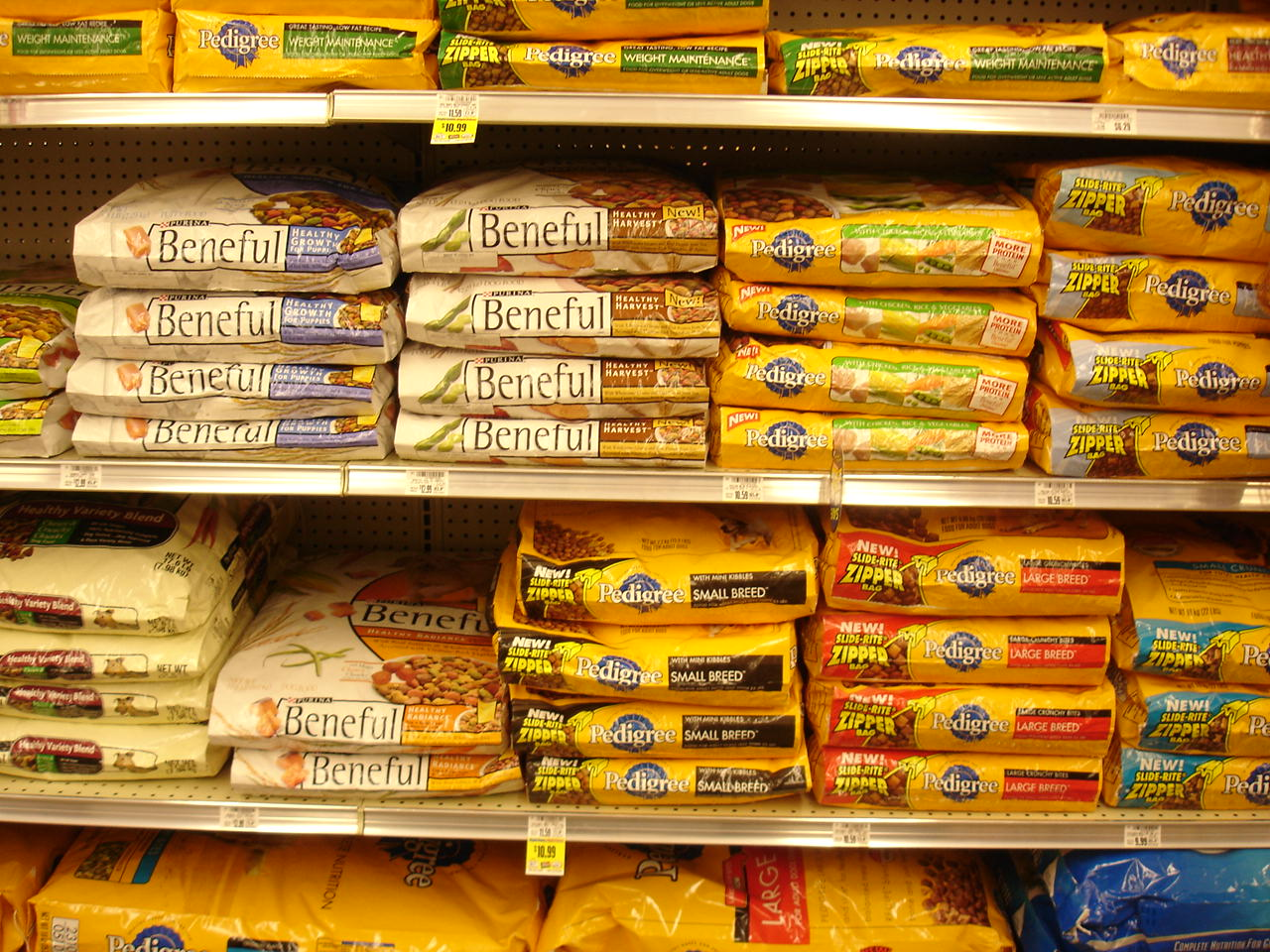
Dog food for sale at a New Hampshire supermarket.

The film begins with, and shows at points throughout, montages of pet food labels from different brands, such as Milk-Bone and Meow Mix. The documentary promotes raw feeding, and criticizes all kibble brands, even ones considered "organic" or "natural". The film also criticizes the fact that pet food manufacturers use the same factories for different brands, thereby potentially misleading consumers that different companies were behind the production of the pet food.

According to the documentary, as of 2013, there were only five pet food manufacturers in the United States: Mars Corporation (manufacturer of Royal Canin, Whiskas, and Pedigree, among others), Nestlé Purina PetCare, Procter & Gamble, Hill's Pet Nutrition (manufacturer of the Science Diet), and The J. M. Smucker Company (formerly Big Heart Pet Brands, manufacturer of Meow Mix and Milk-Bone, among others). In 2014, however, Mars Corporation purchased Procter & Gamble's pet food brands (IAMS, Eukanuba and Natura) from the company, meaning that today there are only four manufacturers.

The documentary showed interviews with several veterinarians who advocate raw feeding, such as Dr. Karen Shaw Becker and Dr. Barbara Royal, and it recounted previous pet food scares, such as the 2007 pet food recalls and the 2013 chicken jerky recall.

Some veterinary professionals interviewed in the film link modern ailments found in pets, such as obesity and allergies, to diet, and claim that changing that diet would eliminate those problems. Among those personally criticized are Dr. Melody Raasch, who has advocated corn as a healthful dog food in the past for IAMS.

Other veterinarians disagreed, such as Dr. Annie Harvilicz, who in her interview said that she believed that bacteria and other pathogens in uncooked foods present a risk to pets. According to Dr. Becker, however, dogs frequently practice coprophagia with no ill effects, and dogs are evolutionarily equipped to be able to process any pathogens in raw food.

The film also explains and criticizes the regulatory framework for pet food in the United States. Pet food and animal feed are not differentiated in the law, which means pets and livestock are in many cases legally the same. If a pet dies due to poisonous food, American courts only return judgments which give plaintiffs minimal amounts of money in light of how much they care for and pay for their pets. In the United States, the Food and Drug Administration (FDA) regulates pet food labels, but the film criticizes the definitions used as misleading. For example, if a pet food has "dinner" on the label, it only need contain 25% meat; if the word "with" is used, as in "with beef", a pet food could be 97% grain or corn with only mandatory 3% beef. If the word "flavor" is used, as in "salmon flavor", the pet food need not contain any salmon at all, the only requirement is that there is enough of the ingredient "to be detected". Only foods specifically labeled with the words "cat food" and "dog food" need contain 95% or more meat.

== Reception ==
Reception to the film was mostly positive; however, it did not have a large theater run and many major publications did not review it. CBS's Chicago affiliate responded positively to the documentary, and included tips on making the switch to raw feeding and recipes from Dr. Barbara Royal. The Daily Journal praised the film, describing it as "breaking down the facade" of the pet food industry. Hammer To Nail called the film a "powerful" documentary that "every pet owner needs to see". The Holmes County Times-Advertiser praised the film, writing "[Pet Fooled exposes] a poorly regulated industry driven more by profits and less by the wellbeing of animals."

Lindsay Beaton, writing for Pet Food Industry, a trade publication funded by the pet food industry, responded negatively to the film, claiming that while labels "can be...confusing and overwhelming", "the industry knows this and has been discussing the issue at great length for some time now". She also stated that the documentary did a poor job of "discussing any of the significant pet food safety changes that have come from those recalls in the decade since [the 2007 pet food recalls.]"
