= Partners (2009 film) =

- DVD cover
- Directed by: Peter James Iengo
- Written by: Peter James Iengo
- Produced by: Peter James Iengo; Skynkronized Media
- Starring: Christoper Iengo; Adam Piacente; Anthony Vaccarella; Aaroon Katter
- Cinematography: Peter James Iengo
- Music by: Christopher Sauter
- Production company: Tabo Tabo Films
- Distributed by: Synkronized US LLC
- Release date: June 5, 2009 (Staten Island)
- Running time: 100 minutes
- Country: United States
- Language: English

Partners is a 2009 American independent crime film written, directed and produced by Peter James Iengo.

== Plot ==
Two NYPD detectives, Christopher Perez (Christopher Iengo) and his partner Steve Clarkson (Adam Piacente), take on Peskin (Aaron Katter), a vicious drug lord.

== Reception ==
On March 13, 2018, Partners was featured in RedLetterMedia's popular YouTube video review series Best of the Worst. The film was the second entry in RedLetterMedia's Best of the Worst Hall of Fame.
