= Pubescence (film) =

2011 film by Guan Xiaojie

- Traditional Chinese: 青春期
- Simplified Chinese: 青春期
- Hanyu Pinyin: Qīngchūnqī
- Directed by: Guan Xiaojie
- Written by: Guan Xiaojie
- Produced by: Zhou Lianjing; Yao Jianjiang; Sun Dongsheng
- Starring: Zhao Yihuan; Wang Yi
- Cinematography: Liu Yin; Guang Liang
- Production company: GEABIES
- Distributed by: Beijing Youyuan Film Company
- Release date: 20 July 2011 (China)
- Running time: 51 minutes
- Country: China
- Language: Mandarin

Pubescence is a 2011 Chinese teen sex comedy film directed and written by Guan Xiaojie, starring Zhao Yihuan and Wang Yi. It is the first film in the Pubescence theatrical series. The film was a box-office hit and spawned three direct sequels: Paradise Lost, Pubescence 3, and Pubescence 4. It was released on 20 July 2011. The film is regarded as China's American Pie.

== Cast ==
- Zhao Yihuan as Cheng Xiaoyu, a teenage girl with severe conduct problems.
- Wang Yi as Wang Xiaofei, a homeboy who loves Cheng Xiaoyu.
- Wang Mengting as Chanel.
- Guo Jiawei as Lizi.
- Gu Zheng as Qingchun.
- Qin Hanlei as Qin Xianglin, the PE teacher.
