= Psychophony: An Experiment in Evil =

- Directed by: Xavier Berraondo
- Written by: Xavier Berraondo
- Produced by: Lidia Titos
- Starring: Ferran Albiol; Dafnis Balduz
- Cinematography: Marcos Pasquin
- Edited by: José Ramón Lorenzo Picado
- Music by: Néstor Romero Clemente
- Production companies: Carambola Dreams; 7d7 Productions
- Release date: 2012
- Running time: 80 minutes
- Country: Spain
- Language: Spanish

Psychophony: An Experiment in Evil is a 2012 Spanish horror thriller film directed by Xavier Berraondo, starring Ferran Albiol and Dafnis Balduz

== Cast ==
- Ferran Albiol as Quino
- Dafnis Balduz as Kai
- Ferran Carvagal as Sergi
- Mercè Montalà as Dra. Jara
- Miriam Planas as Lis
- Clàudia Pons as Ainara
- Babeth Ripoll as Graciela
- Leyla Rodríguez as Luz

== Reception ==
Mark L. Miller of Ain't it Cool News wrote a positive review of the film, writing that "Whether you are a believer or not, despite some soap operatic performances, PSYCHOPHONY is downright scary when it uses its supposed real footage." Jeremy Blitz of DVD Talk wrote a mixed review of the film, writing that "It's not awful, but not terribly impressive." Joel Harley of Starburst rated the film 6 stars out of 10, calling it "merely middling, inoffensive and a little cheap."

The film received a rating of 2 out of 5 in Horror Society.
