= Peter (2021 film) =

- Directed by: Amol Arvind Bhave
- Story by: Rajesh Bhalerao
- Produced by: Amol Arvind Bhave, Dipankar Ramteke, Paresh B Patil and Rohandeep Singh
- Starring: Prem Borhade, Manisha Bhor, Amol Pansare, Vinietaa Sancheti, Siddheshwar Siddhesh, Sunil Dhage, Sharad rajguru
- Cinematography: Amosh Puthiyattil
- Edited by: Kishor Namdev
- Music by: Shree Gurunath Shree
- Production companies: Aanandi Enterprises, Jumping Tomato Marketing Pvt. Ltd. & The 9 Sprocket Entertainment
- Release date: 22 January 2021
- Running time: 103 minutes
- Country: India
- Language: Marathi

Peter is a 2021 Marathi language film directed by Amol Arvind Bhave. The Film is presented and distributed by Rohandeep Singh of Jumping Tomato Marketing Pvt Ltd. The film was released on 22 January 2021.

== Cast ==
- Prem Borhade, as Dhanya
- Manisha Bhor as Paru
- Amol Pansare as Babaji
- Vinietaa Sancheti as leela
- Siddheshwar Siddhesh as Sopan
- Sunil Dhage as in Baba
- Sharad Rajguru as Bhagat

== Plot ==
The story is about a 10 year old boy named Dhanya and his baby goat. As a ritual in the village, goats are sacrificed. As there were no goats available because of the fair in village, villagers had an eye on Dhanya's goat but as the goat was too small it was not considered for scarification. The villagers decided to plan the event after 6 months. For raising the baby goat Dhanya was elected and he happily accepted the job. Being together for almost 5 month with the goat, Dhanya develops a strong friendship. Dhanya was called as Peter by his school friends.

As day by day the bond between Dhanya and baby goat increased, Dhany's mother got worried about the day of sacrifice. The event was hold for his uncle could have a baby.
