= Pro peníze =

1912 film by Antonín Pech

Pro peníze is a 1912 Czech silent drama film. It was made by Kinofa film company and directed by Anthony Pech. It was filmed in Prague and mostly used amateur actors.
