= Paradise Lost (2011 film) =

2011 film by Guan Xiaojie

- Film poster
- Traditional Chinese: 青春失樂園
- Simplified Chinese: 青春失乐园
- Hanyu Pinyin: Qīngchūn Shīlèyuán
- Directed by: Guan Xiaojie
- Written by: Guan Xiaojie
- Produced by: Yao Jianjiang; Zhou Lianjing; Sun Dongsheng
- Starring: Zhao Yihuan; Wang Yi
- Cinematography: Jiang Kai
- Production companies: Bale; GEABIES
- Release date: 11 November 2011 (China)
- Running time: 90 minutes
- Country: China
- Language: Mandarin

Paradise Lost is a 2011 Chinese teen sex comedy film and the sequel to the film Pubescence and the second film in the Pubescence film series. It was directed and written by Guan Xiaojie, starring Zhao Yihuan and Wang Yi. It was released in China on Singles Day.

== Cast ==
- Zhao Yihuan as Cheng Xiaoyu
- Wang Yi as Wang Xiaofei
- Tian Xiaotian as Xiaotian
- Mo Xi'er as Xi'er
- Song Dan as Dandan
- Wang Zitong as Zitong
- Yang Ruijia as Li Mingyu
- Liang Tingyu as Da Qi
- Li Hongtao as Bobo
- Cheng Zicheng as Houzi
- Tangchao Yucheng as Huazi
- Qin Hanlei as Yuan Xianglin, PE teacher
- Yuan Yixin as Xia Tian, PE teacher

== Soundtrack ==
- Sunny Xie - "Double Face"
