= Politicking in Paradise =

- Directed by: Devron Pinder
- Written by: Nathaniel Prince Lewis
- Produced by: Nathaniel Prince Lewis
- Starring: Nathaniel Prince Lewis; Alfred Lewis; Deniro Anderson; LaVaughan Hamilton; Chelsea Blues; Ana-Alicia Carroll; LaToya Dean
- Edited by: Devron Pinder
- Production companies: Prince Lewis Projects; Diplight Media
- Distributed by: Prince Lewis Projects
- Release date: 2012
- Running time: 29 minutes
- Country: The Bahamas
- Language: English
- Budget: $200

Politicking in Paradise is a 2012 Bahamian comedy-thriller short film written and produced by Nathaniel Prince Lewis and his film studio Prince Lewis Projects and Directed by Devron Pinder of Diplight Media. Filmed in HD, the picture stars Nathaniel Prince Lewis (Allan Smith Jr.), Alfred Lewis (Johnny), Deniro Anderson (Andrew), LaVaughan Hamilton (Tyson) and Chelsea Blues (Kayla).

== Plot ==
The film documents Allan Smith Jr. a young progressive running for a seat in the Bahamian House of Assembly with the help of his three best friends - a financier (Johnny) a deacon (Andrew) and a playa-playa (Tyson) and tells the story of what happens the day before the 2012 general election and the day of.

== Release ==
The film has been submitted to screen at the Fort Lauderdale International Film Festival on location screening on Grand Bahama Island October, 2011 and will subsequently be released in Bahamian theaters November 2011.
