= Psychotropica =

2009 film by Damien Sage

- Directed by: Damien Sage
- Written by: Serigio Mauroforte
- Produced by: Damien Sage; Artemicion Zirconia
- Starring: Damien Sage; Braden West; Tiffany Titmouse; Kurtwood Jones; Bruce Delrich; Iza Rose; Aeryn Süin; Mychael Valentine; Artemicion Zirconia; Bob Frezza; Maximillian Magick
- Cinematography: Dario Rombaldi
- Edited by: Lucio Nero
- Music by: Aeryn Süin; RIP/TORN
- Production company: Static Omega Films
- Distributed by: AMP/Diamond Dust
- Release date: July 13, 2009
- Running time: 93 minutes
- Country: United States
- Language: English

Psychotropica is a 2009 experimental fantasy film. It was directed by Damien Sage. The film was also written by Damien Sage under the pseudonym Sergio Mauroforte. The cast is composed of mostly unknown actors and actresses from the Raleigh, North Carolina area. The film also features Aeryn Süin of the industrial rock band RIP/TORN in a supporting role. Aeryn Süin and RIP/TORN also provided the score and original songs.

The film is told in a fractured narrative that jumps through different time periods in the lead character's life. It is purposefully unclear as to whether some events shown are real, psychologically distorted or outright fantasy, as the entire movie was conceived to be like a series of hallucinations or interconnected dreams captured on film.

Psychotropica was shot in and around Raleigh, Damien Sage's home town. Some scenes were also shot in the city of Graham, North Carolina. About 40% of the film was shot and produced in 2005; shooting stopped due to various reasons (mostly owing to Damien Sage funding the film out of pocket) then commenced again in 2009. The remaining 60% of the film was shot and produced from July 2008 to July 2009.

== Plot ==
The film opens with an elderly man (Damien Sage as "The Patient") leaving a rushed and emotional, voice message to his partner of 30 years. The Patient implies that an insidious person from his distant past (a past he never spoke of to his lover) has shown up and this person is very dangerous. The Patient has decided to run out on the good life he has had for so long, to leave his lover and everything they have behind to keep his partner out of harms way. When The Patient finishes his message and prepares to leave he suffers from delirium, and he sees an orange fishtank with devil horns and eats it. In this moment the Patient drifts off into his subconscious mind, into his past. As this happens the "elderly" Patient's apartment fades away into a bright white light that reveals a large ominous building perched on a jagged cliff side, overlooking the sea...

Two voices appear over the scene, one is of The Patient (age 25 at this point) and the other is a sadistic man known only as "The Doctor" (played by Maximillian Magick). The Doctor states that he has been administering an experimental drug called "Psychotropica" to The Patient and mercilessly interrogating him about a traumatic and off kilter "nightmare" for quite sometime now (in an effort to "study" his reactions.) The Patient is obviously in great emotional and psychological stress and does not wish to continue the "treatment" but The Doctor forces him to continue for "as long as it takes" under threat of severe "punishment." Reluctantly The Patient agrees to continue relating his painful nightmare for The Doctor. The Patient takes a deep breath and begins his psychological "trip"...

As The Patient begins, the scene fades into an odd neon landscape, that features a never ending "highway of the mind", glowing green plasma mountains and billowing technicolor clouds that flow relentlessly in the sky. The Patient can now be seen standing off in the distance of this dreamscape. We move slowly past him and into the sky. We travel through the vast reaches of space and time at great speed until we are thrust into the first major segment of The Patient's "nightmare"...

From here on out the film plays like a dream would, jumping wildly in tone and style, from the past to the present, each segment related in some meaningful way to the ones before and after. The dream logic of the film is only interrupted by brief interludes of The Patient setting up and describing each part of his "nightmare." Most of this nightmare revolves around The Patient's tumultuous relationship with his sadistic Stepbrother and Sister (played, as adults by Braden West and Tiffany Titmouse) and his efforts to break away from them and their violent life together. Along the way there are visually stylish dreams with dreams, a pulse-pounding psychedelic sex scene between the step brother and sister, an extended Evil Dead homage that segues into an epic animated sequence that pits The Patient's conflicting "light and dark" sides against one another. There are also moments of unmitigated violence, black comedy, brutal fights and visually stunning weirdness; all building up to an emotionally and psychologically explosive final act where all the secrets of the "nightmare", The Doctor and The Patient are revealed.

== Cast ==
- Damien Sage as The Patient
- Braden West as The Brother
- Tiffany Titmouse as The Sister
- Kurtwood Jones as The Patient (Age 12)
- Bruce Delrich as The Brother (Age 10)
- Iza Rose as The Sister (Age 14)
- Aeryn Süin as The Specialist
- Mychael Valentine as The Assassin
- Artemicion Zirconia as The Lover
- Bob Frezza as The Son
- Maximillian Magick as The Doctor

== Production ==
Damien Sage began shooting the film, under a slightly different concept and title called "The Eclipse" in January 2005. Sage and his small crew of local area actors and actresses shot the scenes (now referred to in the DVD Scene Selection) as "Death In The Park, Part 1", "Sister Takes His Car", "Yummy Steamy Incest" and "Death of the Boy" from January 2005 until June 2005. At that time the lead actress went to college and the co-lead actor went into the military. Sage held onto the footage already shot and moved on to other projects.

After working on several short films (including the well received suspense short "D.O.D. (Dead on Delivery)") Due to the semi-success of "D.O.D." Sage was in talks to do a feature-length version of that film. He and his company had negotiated a deal for a $300,000 USD budget and had arranged for several "name" actors to star in said production. When it came time for shooting to proceed however, the financial backers pulled out "due to a loss at Cannes" and left Sage and his cinematic team hanging. Sage scrapped the project they were working on and vowed to do the next film (and every other thereafter) totally independently. This film turned out to be "Psychotropica."

Using the basic structure of "The Eclipse's" original plot (a sordid love triangle between two brothers and their sister) Sage concocted the new more ambitious saga that would become Psychotropica. Psychotropica ended up being shot for far less than $1,000 USD. The cast and crew like to jokingly say that the movie was made with a budget so low "no money was harmed during the making of this film."

With a new cast in place Sage and company commenced shooting on the remainder of Psychotropica from July 2008 until July 2009. Post production work, including editing, scoring and visual effects were done simultaneously. The film was shot on Mini-DV Cassettes, using a Panasonic DVx 100-a Camera. As the film is an homage to the "classic" works of Dario Argento, Ken Russell, John Waters (and many others) Sage purposefully gave the film a retro look; using vivid "psychedelic" color schemes alternating with black and white, "kung-fu" snap zooms, star filters, soft focus and faux rear screen projection (among many other techniques.) Also, in order for Psychotropica to appear as if it were a "Eurotrash" film from the 1970s Sage added film grain and scratches in post production, to make it seem almost as if the film had been shot on Super-8 or VHS.

After the final cut of the film was prepared, Sage desired to give the film an extra edge. So he went back and hand animated over the top of the footage, to enhance the surreality of the film even more and as a reference to "Childhood drawings by The Patient" mentioned in the plot of the film. (Critics have compared this style to the works of Ralph Bakshi and Richard Linklater.)

=== Music ===
Aeryn Süin and his band RIP/TORN composed original songs and score for Psychotropica (after having composed for Sage's short film "D.O.D.")

To achieve the desired unique sound for the score and songs Süin used many odd and outlandish instruments and methods, including: Dulcimers, ebows, household objects (buckets, cabinets, etc.), a de-constructed synthesizer and older, worn in guitars made in the 70s and 80s.

Once all of the songs and score were completed and in place Sage was so pleased with the results that he gave "Music By RIP/TORN" pre-title, top billing in the film and Süin an Associate Producer's credit.

== Reception ==
Judge Gordon Sullivan of DVD Verdict Said: "Psychotropica certainly looks and sounds like no other film I am familiar with... Damien Sage set out to create a unique assault on the eyes and ears with Psychotropica, and on that score he succeeds admirably."

== Release ==
Static Omega Films and AMP/Diamond Dust released the DVD in November 2009 independently through CreateSpace.
