= Sunny Xie =

- Born: November 28, 1990 (age 35); Wuhan, Hubei, China
- Education: Jiangxi University of Finance and Economics
- Occupations: Singer, Actress
- Years active: 2011-present
- Height: 166 cm (5 ft 5 in)

Chinese name
- Traditional Chinese: 謝容兒
- Simplified Chinese: 谢容儿
Transcriptions
Standard Mandarin
- Hanyu Pinyin: Xiè Róng'er
- Musical career
- Genre: Mandapop
- Label: Beijing Birdy Art Spread Limited Duty Company

Sunny Xie (Chinese: 谢容儿; pinyin: Xiè Róng'er; born November 28, 1990) is a Mandarin Chinese singer and actress born in Wuhan, China. She has released five albums.

== Discography ==
Cat And Fish 2010

1. 你是貓兒我是魚 – Ni Shi Mao Er Wo Shi Yu
2. 瑪麗叔叔的冒險 – Ma Li Su Su De Gan Mao
3. 蘿蔔白菜各有所愛 – Luo Bo Bai Cai Ming You Suo Ai
4. 你知道我對你的好 – Ni Zhi Dao Wo Dui Ni De Hao
5. 愛情城堡 – Ai Qing Cheng Bao
6. 年華 – Nian Hua
7. 天使愛 – Tian Shi Ai
8. 少年 – Shao Nian
9. 淡藍色的夢想 – Dan Lan Se De Mong Xiang
10. 公主 – Gong Zhu
11. 吃不完的愛 – Chi Bu Wan De Ai

You Do Not Deserve 2011

1. 你不配 – Ni Bu Pei
2. 你是貓兒我是魚 – Ni Shi Mao Er Wo Shi Yi
3. 蘿蔔白菜各有所愛 – Luo Bo Bai Cai Min You Suo Ai
4. 你知道我對你的好 – Ni Zhi Dao Wo Dui Ni De Hao
5. 公主 – Gong Zhu
6. 年華 – Nian Hua
7. 天使愛 – Tian Shi Ai
8. 少年 – Shao Nian
9. 淡藍色的浪漫 – Dan Lan Se De Lang Man
10. 瑪麗叔叔的冒險 – Ma Li Shu Shu De Mao Xian
11. 愛情城堡 – Ai Qing Cheng Bao
12. 吃不完的愛 – Chi Bu Wan De Ai
13. 你不配 – Ni Bu Pei

Sunny Xie (self-titled) 2011

1. 那又怎樣 Na You Zen Yang
2. 絨絨草 Rong Rong Cao
3. 偶像派 Ou Xiang Pai
4. Sweet
5. 無關幸福 Wu Guan Xing Fu
6. 學會堅強 Xue Hui Jian Qiang
7. 說好一起 Shou Hai Yi Qi
8. 你知道我對你的好 Ni Zhi Da0 Wo Dui Ni De Hao
9. 我的愛還在 Wo De Ai Hai Zai
10. 故事重播 Gu Shi Chong Bo
11. 你不配 Ni Bu Pei (Rap Version)

Lonely 2013

1. 寂寞
2. Double Face
3. 小白臉
4. 你的愛太囂張
5. Show Girl
6. 愛說話
7. 愛如甲骨文
8. 忘記你是誰
9. 末次見面
10. 不要裝熟
11. 等你
12. 彎月亮
13. 其實我很在乎你
14. Sweet
15. 我不做你娘娘

真爱我做主 2014

1. 谢谢你祝我生日快乐
2. 废纸
3. 真爱我做主
4. 爱情指南
5. 完美日出
6. 梦想
7. 我爱你时你不爱我
8. 加速爱
9. 错
10. 我想
11. 坏孩子

电视剧 我和我的他们 2014

1. 小草与树的对话

旁人 2019

1. 旁人

你得到了你想要的 2019

1. 你得到了你想要的

自以为师 2019

1. 自以为师

及时行乐 2019

1. 及时行乐

就此别过 2019

1. 就此别过

有疾而终(圣诞版) 2019

1. 有疾而终(圣诞版)

医能自医 2020

1. 医能自医
2. 倦怠
3. 热度

鹊桥会 2021

1. 鹊桥会
