= Anthony DiMaria =

American actor, director, and producer

- Born: May 14, 1966 (age 60); Las Vegas, Nevada U.S.
- Citizenship: United States
- Occupations: Actor, producer, author, director
- Years active: 1989–present

Anthony DiMaria (born May 14, 1966) is an American actor, producer, author, and director. He is also known for preserving the legacy of his uncle, Jay Sebring, a pioneering stylist who was killed by members of the Manson Family in 1969, during what is now known as the Tate murders.

== Education ==
Anthony DiMaria was a 1984 graduate of Las Vegas' Bishop Gorman High School. In 1989, DiMaria earned his BFA at the University of Southern California (USC) School of Dramatic Arts.

== Career ==
In both educational and professional capacities, Anthony DiMaria has worked off-Broadway, Off-Off-Broadway, and in regional New York/Los Angeles theatres with The Barrow Group, Actors Studio, Neighborhood Playhouse, and Circle Rep LAB. In movies and TV, DiMaria has often played roles in soap operas (One Life to Live and Guiding Light), appeared in The Sopranos, and made a feature film debut as Jam Kitchen in the Sundance hit The Pigeon Egg Strategy, shot in Hong Kong.

Anthony DiMaria has further performed as Weldon Giles in Disney's Pixel Perfect and Howard Fox in Woody Allen's Café Society. DiMaria also worked as characters in CSI (Primum Non Nocere episode), Strong Medicine (PMS, Lies, and Red Tape episode), HBO's The Leftovers (Penguin One, Us Zero episode), David Milch's Deadwood (and also John from Cincinnati), along with Showtime's Ray Donovan.

== Jay Sebring documentary ==
In 2020 Anthony DiMaria released the feature documentary Jay Sebring....Cutting to the Truth, which presented a platform to correct and illuminate his uncle Jay Sebring's life outside the Manson murders. Distributed in North America by Shout Studios, the documentary was a critical success and featured in-depth investigative interviews with Quincy Jones, Nancy Sinatra, Quentin Tarantino, Dennis Hopper, and others.

In his 2020 Los Angeles Times review, critic Michael Ordoña found Cutting To the Truth to be "an impressive directorial debut for actor Anthony DiMaria," noting its "stylish" presentation, and an "absorbing and passionate" narrative.

In 2020 Jay Sebring....Cutting to the Truth was nominated by the CIFF for the Nesnadny + Schwartz Documentary Competition Award.

On 9 August 2025 the documentary premiered in Los Angeles through the American Cinematheque.

== Manson family parole hearings ==
Since 2004 Anthony DiMaria has spoken for the Sebring family and advocated for the Gary Hinman and LaBianca families as a representative in numerous parole hearings for Manson family members Patricia Krenwinkel, Charles Watson, Leslie Van Houten, and Susan Atkins, Bruce Davis and Robert Kenneth Beausoleil.

Anthony DiMaria and his immediate family continuously and unfailingly urged the California Department of Corrections and Rehabilitation to deny any and all parole or release to the remaining Manson group. In one of Watson's parole hearings Anthony DiMaria commented, "These are troubled waters for many of us in here today and I would be remiss if I didn't state that I feel profound sorrow for all of us involved, and great sorrow for Mr. Watson."

In 2016, Anthony DiMaria urged the California Board to consider parole for Patricia Krenwinkel "when her victims are paroled from their graves".

In 2022, DiMaria spoke at Manson follower Bruce Davis' parole hearing, on behalf of families victimized by Davis' actions. DiMaria stated, "Bruce Davis remains in prison because his crimes were so severe and profound that they shook our country to its core, with permanent repercussions". Davis was denied parole.

In 2023, Anthony DiMaria nationally expressed to CNN Anchor Laura Coates concerns with the parole release of Leslie Van Houten: "With her release now, any other violent criminal or killer whose crimes fall beneath the bar of (her) very extreme crimes---that also have historical impact---that opens the door for them. And it is our fear that the floodgates in the California penal system will be unhinged."

== Jay Sebring biography 2025 ==
In summer 2025 Anthony DiMaria and co-author Marshall Terrill released the 576-page biography (522 pages on Kindle) Jay Sebring: Cutting to the Truth. The book was published through Steven W. Booth's "Genius Book Publishing" with substantially restored facts, images, and interviews regarding Jay Sebring's life history. People Magazine covered the biography's release in part by saying that Sebring had been shot and stabbed after charging Watson.

The Cutting to the Truth biography was initially introduced to the public with a Hollywood screening and Q&A of DiMaria's original Sebring film documentary, held 9 August 2025 at the vintage Los Feliz 3 theatre and delivered by the American Cinematheque organization (led by chairman Rick Nicita) via Hollywood's Larry Edmunds Bookshop.

== Bibliography ==
- Bruce Lee: The Jay Sebring Connection (2022) Co-Author (with David Tadman and Steve Kerridge)
- Jay Sebring: Cutting to the Truth (2025) Co-Author (with Marshall Terrill)

== Filmography (partial) ==
=== Film ===
1997	The Pigeon Egg Strategy	Jam Kitchen and Bartender 89	Shot in Hong Kong
2000	Bob's Video	Tommy	Opposite Elizabeth Daily
2003	High Roller: The Stu Ungar Story	Tony	
2008	21	Casino Host	
2014	Sullivan Street	Johnny	Short/Cannes
2015	Dancer and the Dame	ADR of multiple characters	
2016	Café Society	Howard Fox	Woody Allen
2019	The drought.	The Uncle	Short; Regina Corrado
2019	Once Upon a Time in Hollywood	Special Thanks	Quentin Tarantino
2020	Jay Sebring....Cutting to the Truth	Himself	Directed and Produced

=== Television ===
1990	Dick Wolf's Nasty Boys	Security Guard	Episode "Crossover"
1997	One Life to Live	Doorman	Episode #1.7339
1997	Guiding Light	Tony	Recurring; two episodes
2000	America's Most Wanted	Bartender	Episode unknown
2001	The Sopranos	Ruggerio's Son	Episode "Mr. Ruggerio's Neighborhood"
2002	CSI: Crime Scene Investigation	Bartender	Episode "Primum Non Nocere"
2003	Strong Medicine	Ralphie Bonfiglio	Episode "PMS, Lies and Red Tape"
2004	Pixel Perfect (Disney)	Weldon Giles	TV movie
2006	Deadwood	Pinkerton Douglass	Episode "Tell Him Something Pretty"
2007	John from Cincinnati	Anglo	Recurring
2014	The Leftovers (HBO)	Tactical Agent Kryczeck	Episode "Penguin One, Us Zero"
2015	Ray Donovan	Matty Flynn	Episode "Ding"
