= Elfman =

Elfman is a surname. Notable people with the surname include:

- Clare "Blossom" Elfman (1925–2017), American writer
- Bodhi Elfman (born 1969), American actor
- Danny Elfman (born 1953), American composer
- Eric Elfman, writer
- Hanna Aronsson Elfman (born 2002), Swedish alpine skier
- Jenna Elfman (born 1971), American actress
- Marja Elfman (born 1972), Swedish freestyle skier
- Richard Elfman (born 1949), American actor, director
