= Jay Sebring....Cutting to the Truth =

2020 documentary film by Anthony DiMaria

- Directed by: Anthony DiMaria
- Produced by: Noor Ahmed; Johnny Bishop; Voss Boreta; Anthony DiMaria; Chad Layne; Maria Rogers; Jacob Strunk
- Starring: Dennis Hopper; Quincy Jones; BarBara Luna; David Milch; Vidal Sassoon; Cami Sebring; Fred Segal; Nancy Sinatra; Quentin Tarantino; Robert Wagner
- Cinematography: Johnny Bishop
- Edited by: Johnny Bishop
- Music by: Jeff Beal
- Production companies: 1010 Films; Halation
- Distributed by: Shout Factory
- Release dates: March 6, 2020 (Cinequest); September 22, 2020
- Running time: 91 minutes
- Country: United States
- Language: English

Jay Sebring....Cutting to the Truth is a 2020 American documentary film that studies Jay Sebring's life as the first international pioneer in the industry of men's style and hair. Cited as the inspiration for Warren Beatty's character in the 1975 film Shampoo, Jay Sebring's life ended at age 35 when he and four others were killed by the Manson family in what would become known as the Tate murders.

Jay Sebring....Cutting to the Truth premiered at the 2020 Cinequest Film & Creativity Festival, where it was signed to North American streaming distribution by Shout Studios on 26 February 2020. Vice president of Shout acquisitions Jordan Fields remarked, "(Cutting to the Truth) is an intimate, fascinating portrait of a man whose legacy is so much more than how he died. It's how he lived that is the main subject here, and his profound contribution to an entire industry, as well as to the style of the 1960s, is expertly, and finally, celebrated."

== Description ==
Jay Sebring....Cutting to the Truth was directed and produced by Sebring's nephew, Anthony DiMaria. With a production timeline spanning 12 years, DiMaria sought to correct nonfactual and sensational aspects of his uncle's story, in part through the documentary's extensive forensic and firsthand accounts, and also from numerous investigative interviews with Quincy Jones, David Milch, Nancy Sinatra, and others. For example, director Quentin Tarantino, interviewed at length for Cutting to the Truth, commented that, "Jay was different. He created a market where there really wasn't one. Not just a haircut, but men's hair fashion."

In a 2020 interview, Anthony DiMaria said that through his documentary he hoped to remove his uncle from the singular crime history narrative that for decades has celebrated the Manson family as "rock stars". DiMaria presents a wide spectrum of evidence that seeks to re-establish the authentic legacy of Jay Sebring's influence and accomplishments. In 2019, DiMaria told the Chicago Tribune, "The point of the documentary is to restore the face to a culturally, historically relevant individual whose identity and legacy has been stolen from him in the sensationalism of his murder." Later he would say, "It's always boggled my mind that Jay's story wasn’t told sooner".

== Soundtrack ==
The Jay Sebring....Cutting to the Truth musical score was created by Jeff Beal, who is noted for his Blackfish documentary soundtrack along with multiple television Emmy wins and nominations.

== Reception ==
Cutting to the Truth has received largely positive reviews and as of October 2021 holds a Rotten Tomatoes rating of 88%.

Jordan Raup of The Film Stage noted the film's revelation of Jay Sebring as a "great influence on a generation of Hollywood stars, from Marlon Brando to Bruce Lee," while USA Today included the documentary in its exclusive "All the Fall Movies You'll Want To Stream".

William Friedkin, director of The French Connection and the original Exorcist said, "Jay Sebring....Cutting to the Truth is an important, wonderful film and should be seen by as many people as possible."

In 2020 Jay Sebring....Cutting to the Truth was nominated by the CIFF for the Nesnadny + Schwartz Documentary Competition Award.

Michael Ordoña in his 2020 Los Angeles Times review says the film is "stylish," an "absorbing and passionate documentary." Ordoña singles-out DiMaria for "an impressive directorial debut."

On 9 August 2025 the documentary was screened in its LA premiere at the Los Feliz 3 theatre through the American Cinematheque organization, led by chairman Rick Nicita.
