= Thunderhead =

A thunderhead is an extreme cumulonimbus cloud seen during a thunderstorm.

Thunderhead may also refer to:

- Anvil cloud (Cumulonimbus incus cloud)
- Thunderhead (horse), a racehorse
- Thunderhead (Preston and Child novel)
- Thunderhead (Shusterman novel)
- Thunderhead (roller coaster) at Dollywood theme park
- Thunderhead, Son of Flicka, a 1945 film
- Thunderhead Mountain in the Great Smoky Mountains
- Thunderhead, a character in the Young Heroes in Love comic book series
- "Thunderhead (I Just Wanted A Little Rain)", a song on the album Well... by Katey Sagal
- "Thunderhead", a song by Phish from their album Round Room
- "Thunderhead", a song by Overkill from their album Bloodletting
- "Thunderhead", a song by W.A.S.P. from their album The Headless Children
- Thunderhead Raceway, a fictional raceway in the film Speed Racer
