= The Schwa Was Here =

2004 book by Neal Shusterman

- Author: Neal Shusterman
- Language: English
- Genre: Young adult novel
- Publisher: Dutton Penguin
- Publication date: 2004
- Publication place: United States
- Media type: Print (Hardback & Paperback)
- Pages: 228 pp
- ISBN: 978-0-525-47182-0
- OCLC: 54852781
- LC Class: PZ7.S55987 Sbe 2004

The Schwa Was Here is a young adult novel by Neal Shusterman, published by Dutton Penguin in 2004. It is about an eighth-grader's friendship with another student named Calvin Schwa, who goes almost completely unnoticed by the people around him.

== Plot ==
Anthony "Antsy" is an eighth-grader in Brooklyn, New York, who is one of the few who are aware of "The Schwa", another eighth grader who somehow blends into his surroundings and any bystander must focus greatly in order to see him, and most people forget about him immediately; a strange phenomenon called "The Schwa Effect". "The Schwa" is actually a typical boy named Calvin Schwa, who lives with his father after his mother left when he was an infant. Antsy grows closer to Calvin and helps him make friends. On a dare, Calvin must enter the home of "Old Man Crawley", and steal one of his dogs' feeding bowls without being caught. To Calvin and Antsy's surprise, Crawley can see and hear Calvin just as well as Antsy can, making the dare attempt a failure. As reparation for their breaking in, Crawley has the boys assist his blind granddaughter, Lexie, and walk his many dogs. Despite her blindness, Lexie is also capable of noticing Calvin, which overjoys him. Calvin eventually spends his entire college fund on a billboard with a picture of his face and the words "Calvin Schwa was here", in an attempt to make the world notice him, but is heartbroken to find that the road beneath the billboard is under construction. Antsy and Lexie attempt to console him, to no avail. After this heartbreak, Calvin decides to find information about his mother and finds pictures from his father. At the end of the book, Calvin sends a letter to Antsy, saying he found his mother, and thanks Antsy for helping break "The Schwa Effect".

== Inspiration ==
Neal Shusterman stated in an interview that he was inspired to write the book upon doing a Q&A in a school, and not noticing a kid with his hand raised in the middle of the group. Remarking in the interview that upon noticing this he thought, "I want to write a story about an unnoticeable kid and we were in the school library and he was sitting in front of the big dictionary and I thought, well, this kid is kind of like a schwa — that unnoticeable sound in the English language. And that's where the idea came from."

== Reception ==
The book received critical acclaim upon its release, receiving a starred review from School Library Journal and a positive review from Booklist. It also received the 2005 Boston Globe/Horn Book Magazine award for fiction and poetry.

== Adaptations ==
The book has reportedly been optioned by The Disney Channel for a telefilm project. Shusterman, who worked with the channel on the project Pixel Perfect, was lined up to write the script for the project.

It has also been adapted into a three act play by Kory Howard, and was performed for the first time ever in February 2017, by the Manti High School Theatre Department.
