= Jay Sebring =

Hair stylist and murder victim (1933–1969)

- Born: Thomas John Kummer; October 10, 1933; Birmingham, Alabama, U.S.
- Died: August 9, 1969 (aged 35); Los Angeles, California, U.S.
- Cause of death: Multiple stab wounds
- Other names: Thomas John Sebring, T. J.
- Occupation: Hair stylist
- Spouse: Bonnie Lee "Cami" Marple (m. 1960; div. 1963)
- Partner: Sharon Tate (1964–1966)

Thomas John Kummer (October 10, 1933 – August 9, 1969), known professionally as Jay Sebring, was an American celebrity hair stylist, and the founder of the hairstyling corporation Sebring International. Sebring was murdered by members of the Manson Family along with his ex-girlfriend Sharon Tate.

== Early life ==
Born in Birmingham, Alabama, Sebring was the son of an accountant, Bernard Kummer, and his wife, Margarette Gibb. He grew up with one brother and two sisters in a middle-class home in Detroit, Michigan.

After graduating from Detroit Catholic Central in 1951, Sebring served in the Navy for four years, and during this time he fought in the Korean War. He then moved to Los Angeles, where he adopted the name "Jay Sebring": Jay, after the first initial of his middle name, and Sebring after the 12 Hours of Sebring sports car race.

In Las Vegas, on October 10, 1960 (his 27th birthday), Sebring married model Bonnie Lee Marple, nicknamed Cami – a union which ended unofficially in August 1963.

== Career ==
In Los Angeles, he graduated from beauty school and opened a shop on Fairfax Avenue, designing and building it for less than $500. Sebring cut hair for 13 hours a day, sleeping in the back, but was challenged by mounting costs. He promptly "invented a whole new way of cutting men's hair". His innovations including shampooing men's hair before styling it, cutting their hair with scissors instead of clippers, and using blow dryers, which were popular in Europe but not well known in the United States. He used hairspray in an era when Brylcreem was the accepted hair product for men.

His breakthrough happened after meeting actress Barbara Luna at a party. She told Vic Damone, who liked him enough to fly him to Las Vegas for a trim. In turn, he introduced Sebring to Peter Lawford and Frank Sinatra. Sebring would rename himself after Sebring International Raceway, after seeing images of it in a magazine.

In Los Angeles, his modish salon and his style of cutting hair proved popular. He taught his methods to others who then opened Jay Sebring Salon franchises; his styling techniques were still being taught 40 years after his death. In 1967 he opened the company Sebring International to franchise his salons and sell hair care products.

At a time when barbers charged $1 to $2 for a haircut, Sebring charged $50 and more. His hairstyling clients included Warren Beatty and Steve McQueen. He flew to Las Vegas every three weeks to cut the hair of Frank Sinatra and Sammy Davis Jr. At Kirk Douglas's request, Sebring did the hairstyling for the movie Spartacus. He later designed The Doors' Jim Morrison's free-flowing style.

His business, Sebring International, was flourishing by the late 1960s, with profitable salons in West Hollywood, New York City and London. Sebring maintained a playboy lifestyle, with high-profile Hollywood personalities like Beatty among his closest associates.

Sebring assisted with launching the film career of Bruce Lee, after meeting him at the International Karate Championships in Long Beach in 1964. He introduced Lee to his producer friend Bill Dozier, who started Lee's career with The Green Hornet.

Although not seeking an acting career himself, Sebring made a cameo appearance in a December 1966 episode of the TV show Batman, playing a character based on himself called Mr. Oceanbring. Sebring also appeared in a 1967 episode of The Virginian titled "The Strange Quest of Claire Bingham", playing a frontier barber. Sebring also appeared as himself on the January 28, 1963 episode of To Tell the Truth. He received three of four possible votes.

Jay Sebring was one of the people profiled in the 1967 cult documentary, Mondo Hollywood. Bobby Beausoleil, a future member of the notorious Manson Family, was also seen in it. Beausoleil was arrested for the murder of Gary Hinman two days before the Tate–LaBianca murders that took Sebring's life.

Back in 1969, Sebring was nicknamed The Candyman and was said to have used his salon to peddle drugs to the stars. Jim Markham was Sebring’s protege and business partner in a budding franchise of men’s hair salons and has made this statement publicly.

== Relationship with Sharon Tate ==
Sebring and Tate in 1966

Sebring was introduced to Sharon Tate by journalist Joe Hyams in October 1964 and they began a relationship. Sebring bought the former home of Paul Bern, husband of Jean Harlow, on Easton Drive in Benedict Canyon, then owned by Sally Forrest.

Tate went to London in early 1966 to work on The Fearless Vampire Killers with film director Roman Polanski. They began a relationship, and Tate ended her relationship with Sebring, who travelled to London to meet Polanski. He befriended Polanski, while remaining a friend to Tate. Polanski would later comment that despite Sebring's lifestyle, he was a very lonely person, who regarded Tate and Polanski as his family.

In the summer of 1968, Roman Polanski and Sharon Tate introduced Sebring to Polanski's friend Wojciech Frykowski and his girlfriend, Folgers coffee heiress Abigail Folger, who had recently moved to Los Angeles from New York state. Folger later invested in Sebring's hair-care products for men.

In early May 1969, Sebring opened a new salon at 629 Commercial Street in San Francisco, and a champagne reception followed. Guests included Abigail Folger and her mother, Ines, as well as Paul Newman and his wife, Joanne Woodward.

== Death ==
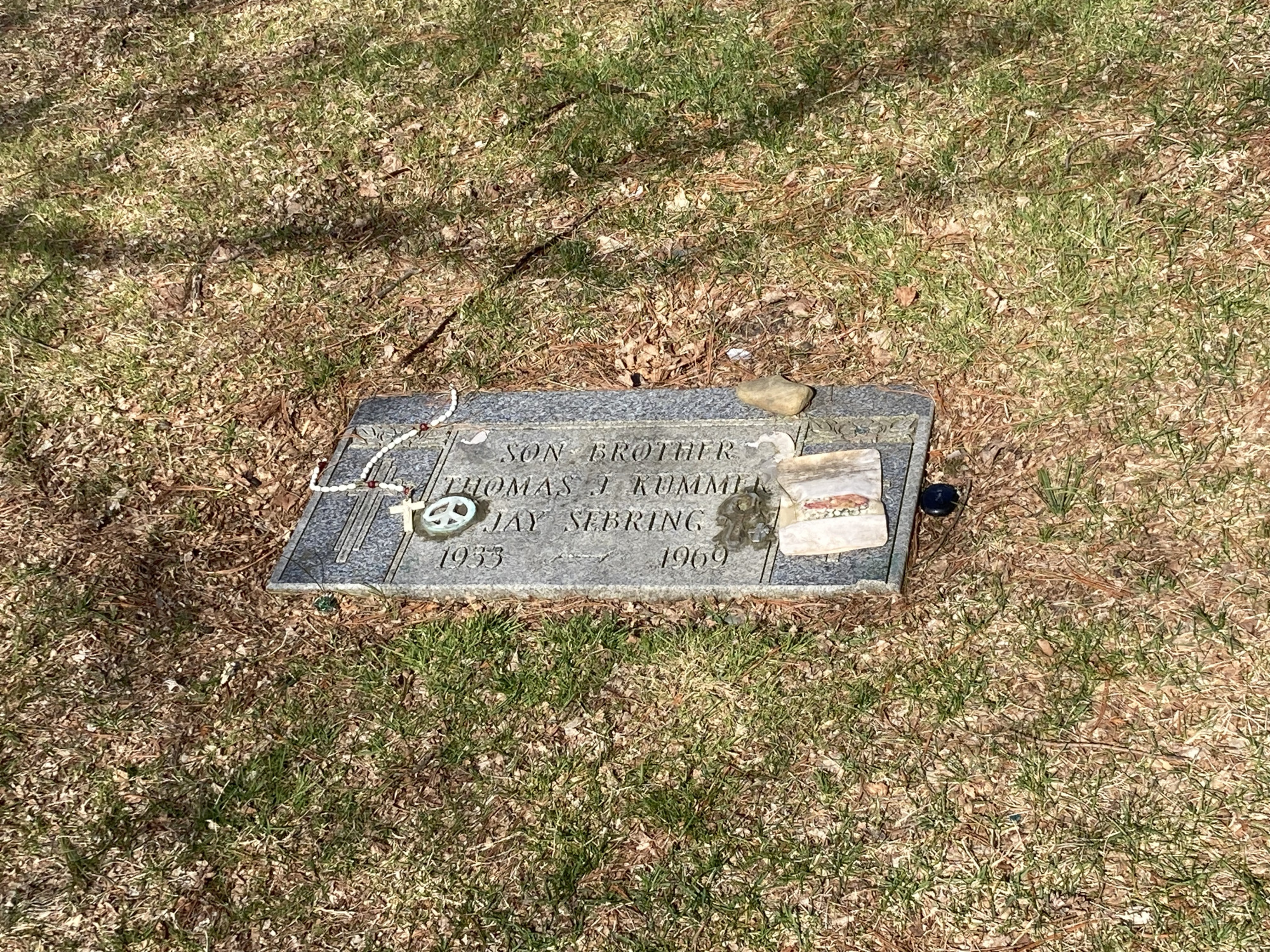
Sebring's grave at Holy Sepulchre Cemetery

On August 8, 1969, Sebring, Tate, Frykowski, and Folger went to El Coyote, a Mexican restaurant, together. After they returned to the Polanski residence on Cielo Drive, Patricia Krenwinkel, Susan Atkins and Charles "Tex" Watson, members of the "Manson Family", entered the home. After coercing the four occupants of the house into the living room, they ordered them to lie face down on the floor.

Sebring protested and asked the intruders to consider Tate's advanced pregnancy. Sebring found an opportunity and aggressively attacked Watson, who was warned of Sebring's move by Susan Atkins. Watson then shot Sebring, knifed his left fist and bayonet stabbed Sebring several times in the back. Sebring died from blood loss caused by his wounds. The group then murdered Frykowski, Folger, and Tate. Sebring's body was found lying down and bloodied, his face disfigured. A long nylon rope was placed around his neck and hung over one of the living room's ceiling beams. At the other end, Tate's body lay with the same rope around her neck. While the coroner's inquest found that Tate was still alive when she was hanged, in Sebring's murder it was found that he was hanged lifeless.

On Wednesday, August 13, funerals for Tate and Sebring took place the same day; the funerals were scheduled several hours apart (first for Tate and then Sebring) to allow mutual friends to attend both.

Sebring was buried at Holy Sepulchre Cemetery in Southfield, Michigan. Steve McQueen gave the eulogy.

== Legacy ==
A feature-length documentary Jay Sebring....Cutting to the Truth was released in September 2020 by Shout! Factory. Directed and produced by Sebring's nephew Anthony DiMaria, the film has received widely positive reviews.

Emile Hirsch portrays Sebring in the 2019 film Once Upon a Time in Hollywood, directed by Quentin Tarantino, which contains a revisionist interpretation of the night of the Manson murders. In the film's version of events, Sebring survives, as the murderers do not attack at the Tate / Polanski address, but next door at the fictional Rick Dalton home.

In 2025 a 576-page biography Jay Sebring: Cutting to the Truth was released through Steven W. Booth's "Genius Book Publishing", written by Marshall Terrill and Anthony DiMaria. The biography was initially introduced to the public with a Hollywood screening and Q&A of the Sebring film documentary at the vintage Los Feliz 3 theatre delivered by the American Cinematheque organization led by chairman Rick Nicita.
