= The Toll (novel) =

2019 novel by Neal Shusterman

- First edition cover
- Author: Neal Shusterman
- Language: English
- Series: Arc of a Scythe #3
- Genre: Science fiction; Dystopian fiction
- Publisher: Simon & Schuster
- Publication date: November 5, 2019
- Publication place: United States
- Pages: 640
- ISBN: 978-1-4814-9706-0
- Preceded by: Thunderhead
- Followed by: Gleanings: Stories from the Arc of a Scythe

The Toll is a 2019 young adult novel by Neal Shusterman. It is the third book in the Arc of a Scythe series, following Scythe and Thunderhead, and preceding Gleanings: Stories from the Arc of a Scythe. The novel was first published by Simon & Schuster on November 5, 2019. It received generally positive reviews.
