= Full Tilt =

Full Tilt may refer to:

- Full Tilt: Ireland to India with a Bicycle, a 1965 travel book by Dervla Murphy
- Full Tilt, a 2003 novel by Janet Evanovich
- Full Tilt (novel), a 2004 young adult novel by Neal Shusterman
- Full Tilt, alternate title for the 1937 film Knights for a Day
- Full Tilt Poker, an online cardroom

== See also ==
- Full Tilt! Pinball, a 1995 video game
