= Everwild =

Everwild may refer to:

- Everwild (novel), a 2009 novel by Neal Shusterman
- Everwild (video game), a cancelled video game
