= Challenger Deep (novel) =

2015 book by Neal Shusterman

- Author: Neal Shusterman
- Genre: Young adult fiction
- Publisher: HarperCollins Children's Books
- Publication date: April 21, 2015
- Pages: 320
- ISBN: 9780061134111

Challenger Deep is a 2015 young adult novel by Neal Shusterman about a teenager's onset of schizophrenia. The story was based on his own son. It won the 2015 National Book Award for Young People's Literature and was placed on "Best of the Year" lists by Publishers Weekly, the New York Public Library, and the American Library Association.

== Plot summary ==
Caden Bosch is a 15-year-old high school student who begins to show psychotic symptoms during his sophomore year. During episodes, he sees himself from the outside, believes signs are sending him coded messages, and suspects that strangers at school are plotting to kill him. After he begins walking hours every day to the point of self-harm, his parents commit him to a residential treatment center.

Interspersed between the chapters about Caden's life and illness are sequences which find Caden aboard a ship, apparently on an expedition to Challenger Deep to search for treasure. The ship is a surreal environment which often seems to change in response to Caden's thoughts. The domineering and mercurial captain brings Caden into his inner circle and charges him with illustrating the voyage. The captain regularly describes sea monsters pursuing the ship, including references to Moby-Dick and Twenty Thousand Leagues Under the Sea. Later, the captain and his parrot each ask Caden to kill the other, a choice Caden finds impossible.

It soon becomes clear that the ocean voyage is a means for Caden to comprehend his time in psychiatric treatment. Characters from the ship reflect figures in reality: the swabbie Carlyle is Caden's group therapy facilitator, the navigator is his roommate Hal, the figurehead Calliope is a fellow patient named Callie who Caden develops a crush on, and the parrot is his psychiatrist, Dr. Poirot. Only the captain has no obvious counterpart, marking him as a representation of mental illness itself. Another patient named Skye gifts Caden a blue puzzle piece, which he keeps in his pocket.

After Callie leaves the hospital and Hal attempts suicide, Caden stops taking his medication and suffers a relapse. In the world of the ship, he shoots the parrot, leaving himself and the captain as the only remaining crew. Caden makes the dive to Challenger Deep and finds piles of treasure, but discovers it all to be a mirage. Accompanied by the parrot's ghost, Caden confronts the sea monsters and accepts that he will drown. However, upon discovering the puzzle piece in his pocket, he finds the will to return to the surface.

Back in the real world, Caden graduates from the program and returns home with his family. In a dream, the captain reappears and invites him on another voyage, but Caden refuses and walks away.

== Reception ==
The dual narrative of the metaphorical hallucinations and the main character's experiences in a psychiatric hospital was highlighted by Jennifer Barnes in a Booklist review, calling the novel a "breathtaking exploration of one teen’s experience with schizophrenia" and a "must-purchase for library collections." Publishers Weekly praised the ability of the novel to "[turn] symptoms into lived reality in ways readers won’t easily forget".
