= Everlost =

2006 fantasy novel by Neal Shusterman

- The cover of Everlost
- Author: Neal Shusterman
- Language: English
- Series: Skinjacker Trilogy
- Genre: Fantasy
- Publisher: Simon & Schuster
- Publication date: 2007
- Media type: Print (hardback & e-book)
- Pages: 492
- ISBN: 1-84738-504-4
- OCLC: 62282121
- Followed by: Everwild

Everlost is a fantasy book published in 2006 by the young adult author Neal Shusterman. The story is the first in the Skinjacker trilogy that takes place in Everlost, the place between life and death.

== Setting ==
Everlost is a place between life and death where some children end up after getting lost in their journey to the afterlife. These lost children, or Afterlights as they are called, are unseen by the living world. The afterlights for the most part cannot interact with the real world and will sink to the Earth's core if they stay still. It is implied that this fate has befallen to a great many afterlights. They can interact with certain objects that are loved so much by their owners that, when the object breaks, it crosses over to Everlost, unbroken, and is given a place there for eternity. The same is for certain places that were destroyed (the twin towers are used as an example) that were loved and cherished by many people and will never be forgotten. There are no adults in Everlost presumably because they know where they are going.

== Plot ==
Nick and Allie are saved by a boy named Lief after waking up in a ghostly parallel to the real world. He tells them that they are "Afterlights" and cannot be seen by the living. Afterlights are somewhat like ghosts, retaining the exact appearance they had when they died. He warns them of a feared monster called the McGill, as well as various groups such as the Altar Boys and Johnie-0. Determined to find a way back home, they journey to New York City together. There they meet Mary Hightower, who is known as the "mother" amongst the Afterlights. She lives in the destroyed World Trade Center, and takes care of children under her guidance. Having lived there for centuries, she has published hundreds of books about the life and rules of Everlost. Places like the Twin Towers exist here because they were valued enough to cross into Everlost after being destroyed. They settle down, but Allie is not content. Allie notices other Afterlights at the Twin Towers keep repeating and doing the same thing every day, becoming stuck in ruts. Allie sets out with Nick and Lief to see whether he has special powers and they meet The Haunter. Allie gets Lief and Nick captured by The Haunter and learns that she can pick up living things and also possess living people, or "Skinjack". Allie explores her power while Nick begins to discover his own purpose.

Allie is captured by the McGill, a grotesque monster who controls a ship full of Afterlights who fear him. The McGill has taken hundreds of Afterlights, including Nick and Lief/Troy prisoner. They are all hung by their ankles like pieces of meat. Since fortune cookies in Everlost always tell the truth, McGill believes he can come back to life if he collects a thousand souls. Allie can manipulate the McGill and grow close to him as she attempts to save Nick and Lief. She makes him think that she can teach him to skinjack, even though only those who come to Everlost with the ability can. The real identity of the McGill is revealed—he is a boy named Mikey McGill, the younger brother of Mary Hightower (really Megan McGill). Mikey and Megan died at the same time and after they awoke as Afterlights they went to their home. There, Megan watched as Mikey sank into the earth. However, unbeknownst to her Mikey was able to claw his way out of the center of the Earth through pure force of will, but over time evolved into a hideous monster, reflective of his anger.

Mary, also known by others as the Sky Witch, had been lying to the children. She stole the coins that all Afterlights invariably have when they wake up. The coins allow them to leave Everlost when they are ready, but Mary misguidedly believes that the light at the end of the tunnel is malicious and that children should stay in Everlost forever. Nick receives the nickname "Chocolate Ogre" because of the chocolate stain on his face, and Mary spreads rumors about how he sends Afterlights away by luring them in with the smell of chocolate.

Allie outsmarts the McGill, who is unmasked by Mary and returned to the form of a human boy when Mary shows a picture of him. Allie, traveling home sinks through a bridge but is later saved by Mikey, who agrees to accompany her the rest of the way to her home.

== Characters ==
- Allie Johnson "Allie the Outcast": Allie is a 14-year-old girl who ends up in Everlost after the car she is riding in, crashes head-on on a highway with the packed black Mercedes that Nick was in. Allie is brave and "goal" orientated though not a planner. She was reborn nine months later in "Everlost" as an Afterlight. Allie discovers that she has the gifted ability to "possess" (or "skinjack" as it is called in the book) people. She tries to return home to meet her parents to put her troubled mind at ease. However, on the way, she and Nick encounter many adventures.
- Nick: He is 14 years old. A half-Japanese boy who is more of a follower, not a leader. He was riding in a packed black Mercedes on the way to a wedding when he died with chocolate on his face; now he is stuck in formal clothes and chocolate-covered mouth for eternity. He is initially enamored by Mary but realizes that she is harming Afterlights and must be stopped.
- Megan "Mary Hightower" McGill: A 15-year-old self-proclaimed expert on Everlost. She has written many books on living in the world between life and death and encourages Afterlights to accept Everlost and stop moving on. She also thinks of herself as the mother of the many children stuck in this world, being one of the oldest inhabitants at fifteen. She will do anything to keep the "lost" Afterlights in Everlost.
- Michael Edward McGill, "The McGill" or "Mikey": The 14-year-old brother of Megan McGill. After escaping the earth's core by becoming a monster, he encounters a ghost ship where he spends nearly 30 years looting and "kidnapping" Afterlights after believing a fortune in a chinese fortune cookie that in exchange for 1000 souls, he can return to the land of the living.
- Travis, alias "Lief": An 11-year-old boy Allie and Nick had found in the crossed-over forest that had burned down years ago. He follows them throughout the novel until he reaches a state of peace and leaves Everlost through a coin. Before he leaves it is discovered that his real name was Travis. This is how Nick realizes the coins have the power to help any Afterlight "to get where they're going".

== Awards ==
The book Everlost has won the following awards:

- 2009 ALA Popular Paperback List
- 2009 Oklahoma Sequoyah Young Adult Award List
- 2009 Garden State Teen Book Award List
- 2008 School Library Journal Best Books of the Year,
- 2008 VOYA - Top Shelf Fiction for Middle School Readers
- 2008 International Reading Association Young Adult Choice List
- 2008/2009 Missouri Gateway Award List
- 2008 New York Public Library “Books for the Teenage.”
- 2007/2008 Georgia Peach Book Award List
- 2007 PEN USA Literary Award - Finalist
- 2007 Children's Literature Council of Southern California “Fantastic Work of Fiction”
