= Mel Haber =

American businessman (1936–2016)

Mel Haber (October 24, 1936 – October 25, 2016) was the owner and proprietor of the Ingleside Inn and Melvyn's Restaurant in Palm Springs, California from 1975 until his death. He also served on the board of the Angel View Crippled Children's Foundation for more than 25 years.

== Early years ==
Haber was born in Brooklyn, New York, the youngest of four children and the only boy of Louis and Mary Haber. The son of a garment district salesman, Haber grew up in an apartment overlooking Ocean Parkway in the Flatbush section of Brooklyn. He attended Erasmus Hall High School; some of its alumni included actors Jeff Chandler, Moe Howard, Bernie Kopell, Barbara Stanwyck, singer Barbra Streisand, author Mickey Spillane, chess player Bobby Fischer and Sid Luckman, the former quarterback of the Chicago Bears.

When Louis Haber died at fifty-two of a heart attack, Mel became the family's breadwinner. To make ends meet, the twelve-year-old started delivering groceries, sold peanuts and beer at Ebbets Field and spent his summers in the Catskills as a busboy. He says it was there where he learned “motion efficiency," which is commonly known as “working smart,” a trait he used when he eventually operated six different restaurants. Once Haber graduated high school, he enrolled in the Fashion Institute of Technology (F.I.T.) on the west side of Manhattan in the fall of 1954.

== Successes and failures ==
Two months after Haber enrolled in F.I.T., he quit after he received a phone call from businessman Artie Schifrin, who offered him a job at $85 a week working for Wallfrin Industries. In December 1954, ABC aired a series called Davy Crockett, Indian Fighter. The coonskin cap worn by actor Fess Parker set off a craze with the nation's youth, and several manufacturing companies, including Wallfrin Industries, jumped on the multimillion-dollar business bandwagon and began producing coonskin items. The craze lasted longer than anyone expected and finally ended when raccoon tails surged from twenty-five cents each to $5 a pound by May 1955.

Out of work for the first time in his life, Haber regrouped at age nineteen. He first sold shoes and then stocks before he received a life-changing phone call from Schifrin, who switched Wallfrin Industries from a bicycle accessories business to an automotive novelty business and desperately wanted him back.

== Wallfrin Industries ==
Following World War II, the greatest and longest economic boom in world history was launched, and by the late fifties, approximately ten million cars were sold on an annual basis. It was an era in which American teenagers (the Baby Boom Generation) did everything in their cars. Between 1961 and 1968, Wallfrin Industries produced 750 different items such as hula dolls that gyrated in rear windows, religious statues for the dashboard, fuzzy dice for the rear view mirror, self-adhesive pin striping and tiger tails to hang on the gas tank. Their most successful product was Amber Lens Dye, which sold more than one million units.

Automatic Radio purchased Wallfrin Industries in 1968 for $3 million, of which Haber collected 10 percent. Haber used the money to start several new businesses on the side. He launched a boiler-cleaning business, a front-end wheel-alignment franchise, a company factoring medical centers, an import business, a vacuum forming business, and an automotive-chemical manufacturing business. None of them were money makers and Haber shut them down and regrouped. Facing a textbook mid-life crisis, Haber traded in his large house in Long Island and Rolls-Royce for a used Fiat and a furnished apartment in Marina Del Rey in Los Angeles.

== Palm Springs ==
Invited by a friend to visit Palm Springs, Haber stumbled upon the Ingleside Inn in 1975. The property, located at 200 Ramon Road, was in a state of disrepair thanks to an absentee owner. Haber learned the original owner was the widow of Humphrey Birge, manufacturer of the Pierce-Arrow motorcar. She built the private estate at the foot of the San Jacinto Mountains in 1925 and sold it a decade later to Palm Springs Councilwoman Ruth Hardy, who transformed the place into a 20-room hotel. She successfully ran the Inn for the next thirty years as an exclusive private club whose guests came by invitation only. Hardy's clientele included Howard Hughes, John Wayne, Greta Garbo, Spencer Tracy, Katharine Hepburn, Greer Garson, Elizabeth Taylor, Ava Gardner, Salvador Dalí, Norman Vincent Peale and J.C. Penney.

After Hardy's death in 1965, the stardust from the old days had largely faded away over the next decade. Haber, who knew nothing about operating a resort, made a spontaneous handshake deal to buy the property for $300,000. On April 15, 1975, Haber became the owner of the Ingleside Inn.

== Ingleside Inn and Melvyn's ==
Haber shut down the Inn that summer and spent $500,000 in restoration costs, including Melvyn's restaurant. The Inn re-opened on September 15, 1975, and was an immediate success.

Over the years, the Inn has been a popular destination for Hollywood's elite, U.S. Presidents, royalty, aristocrats, captains of industry and celebrities visiting Palm Springs. They include Frank Sinatra, Jerry Lewis, Bob Hope, Lucille Ball, Marlon Brando, Arnold Schwarzenegger and Maria Shriver, Sylvester Stallone, Liza Minnelli, Liberace, Barry Manilow, Kurt Russell, Goldie Hawn, Don Adams, Rita Hayworth, Pat Boone, Debbie Reynolds, Larry King, John Travolta, Sidney Sheldon, David Hasselhoff, President Gerald Ford, and George Hamilton.

The status of the hotel was enhanced when Frank Sinatra and Barbara Marx held their pre-wedding party at Melvyn's in July 1976. Later the restaurant and Inn were named one of the world's premier hotel and dining venues by Lifestyles of the Rich and Famous.

== Cecils and other restaurant ventures ==
Tapping into the popularity of disco, Haber opened Cecils, a 9,000-square-foot (840 m^{2}) Chinese restaurant/discothèque on October 1, 1979. The $1.2 million disco rivaled Studio 54 in popularity and attracted celebrities like Kirk Douglas, Sonny Bono, Evel Knievel, Reggie Jackson, Smokey Robinson, Joan Collins, Jack Paar, Mary Martin, Carol Conners, Lola Falana, Lyle Waggoner, Ed Marinaro, Deney Terrio and John Travolta.

Haber followed Cecils with a pair of dining ventures in the early 1980s: Saturdays and Doubles. Saturdays was a knock off of the T.G.I. Friday's franchise while Doubles was a large restaurant inside the famed Tennis Club. Haber unexpectedly found himself the second largest employer in Palm Springs with approximately 200 people on his payroll.

== Angel View Foundation ==
Pop culture historians had proclaimed disco as largely irrelevant by 1980, but it was still active in Palm Springs. Haber sold Cecil's to a pair of local businessmen in 1985. That same year he also sold Doubles and Saturdays. Haber then devoted himself to the Angel View Crippled Children's Foundation, which was based in nearby Desert Hot Springs.

The foundation was originally created by a group from the Coachella Valley who felt the area's natural hot springs would be useful in the rehabilitation of children with polio. Angel View's mission broadened to include those children afflicted with a wide range of physical challenges. Haber served as a board member in 1983 and became Angel View's president in 1993. The foundation opened its seventeenth home and named it the Mel Haber House on November 14, 2002.

== Safe House ==
After being the President of Angel View for many years, Mr. Haber stepped down and in 2014 joined the Board of Operation SafeHouse.

SafeHouse's main goal is the protection and well-being of children in crisis, providing emergency shelter and a secure haven for runaway, abandoned and homeless children. As a founding member of the Riverside Anti-Trafficking Task Force, SafeHouse is the leading organization working to combat child trafficking in Coachella Valley. SafeHouse provides assistance to more than 800 children a year.

== Touche ==
Palm Springs had been awaiting Haber's return to the club scene and in January 1994, he obliged them with the opening of Touche, a $1.3 million Moroccan-themed bar, nightclub and restaurant. More than 500 people showed up on opening night, including Andy Williams, George Hamilton, Connie Stevens, Jack Jones, Engelbert Humperdinck, Marc Lawrence and Jackie Mason. Despite an international plug from Runaway with the Rich and Famous (featuring Robin Leach), a pattern emerged at Touche: Haber was turning people away on weekends, but had no mid-week business. He eventually discovered that people's work and play habits had changed, and that there was also more enlightenment about alcohol and substance abuse through the media. Haber sold Touche in 1996 for $250,000 and returned his attentions back to The Ingleside Inn and Melvyn's, which were still thriving.

== Author ==
With the sale of Touche, Haber wrote an anecdotal book called Bedtime Stories of the Ingleside Inn. The book mainly focused on funny stories and misadventures involving the Ingleside Inn and Melvyn's. With a dedication by Arnold Schwarzenegger, the 1996 book sold approximately 10,000 copies.

Haber's second book, Palm Springs á la Carte: The Colorful World of the Caviar Crowd at Their Favorite Desert Hideaway, was co-authored with biographer Marshall Terrill and published in 2008.

== Honors ==
On October 24, 1996 (his 60th birthday) Haber received a Golden Palm Star on the Palm Springs Walk of Stars. Also, the City of Palm Springs designated the Ingleside Inn as an official historic site.
