= Marshall Terrill =

American biographer (born 1963)

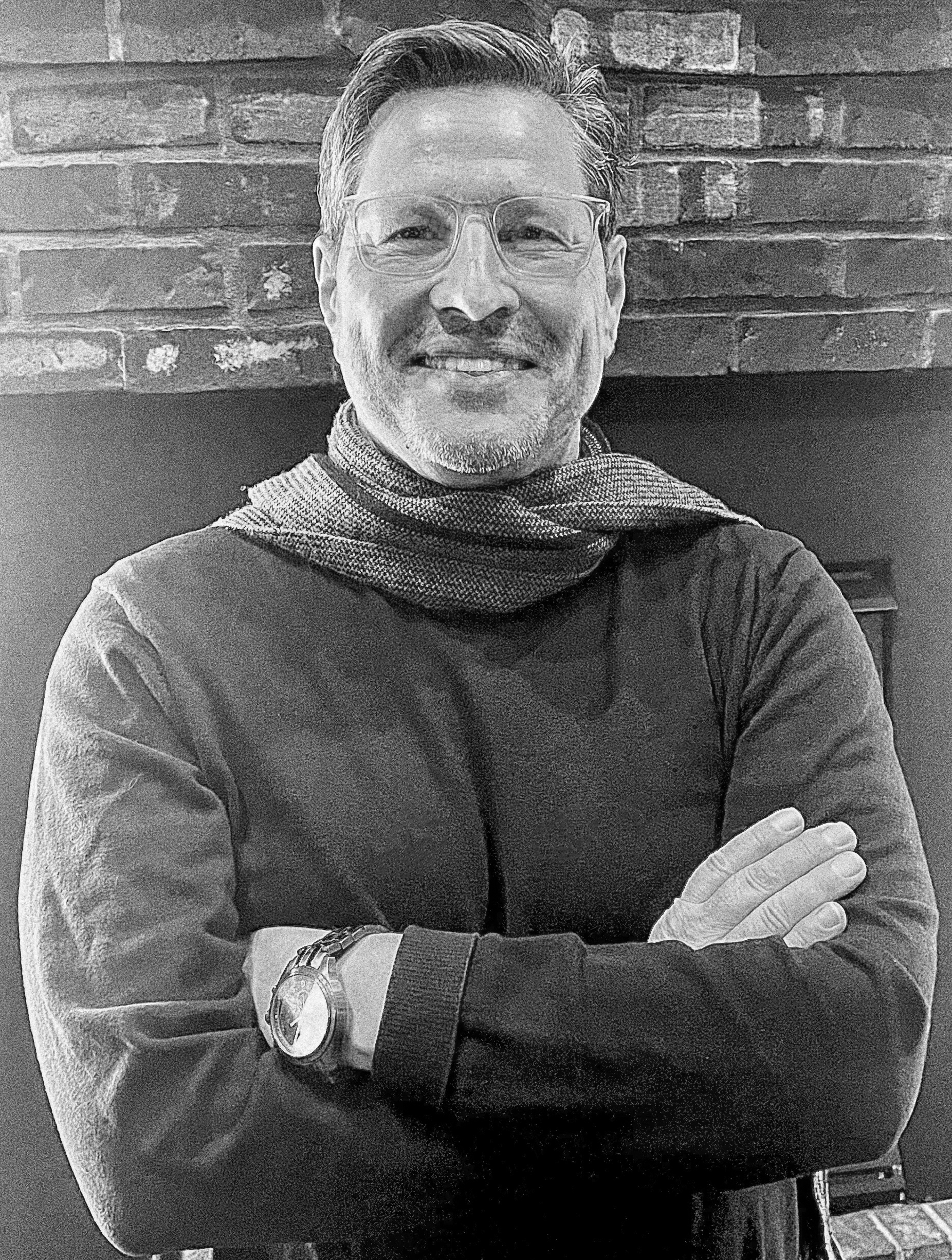
- Marshall Terrill February 2025 Publicity Image
- Born: December 17, 1963 (age 62); Texarkana, Texas, United States
- Occupations: Journalist, biographer
- Writing career
- Genre: Biography
- Website: www.marshallterrillauthor.com

Marshall Terrill (born December 17, 1963) is an American author and journalist, noted for numerous detailed biographies of Steve McQueen, Elvis Presley, Johnny Cash, Billy Graham, Pete Maravich, and Jay Sebring. Since 2008 Terrill has contributed extensively to the Arizona State University official digital newspaper as a longtime journalist covering business and Native American subjects among others.

== Literary ==
Marshall Terrill published more than 30 non-fiction biographies and memoirs between 1993 and 2025, all of them noted for extensive detail and research.

=== Steve McQueen biographies/movies ===
==== Portrait of an American Rebel ====
Starting 1989 during a period of extensively trading Beatles memorabilia (for example, John Lennon lithographs and a Beatles LP signed in purple by all four members), Marshall Terrill spent 3.5 years investigating the life and times of cinema legend Steve McQueen, mining 450 McQueen quotations extracted from five decades of media coverage. In December 1993 Terrill's resulting 564-page biography Steve McQueen: Portrait of an American Rebel was released by Donald I. Fine. Among journalists, Terrill was often considered "the ultimate McQueen expert".

==== Steve McQueen movie deal ====
During his extensive written work on McQueen's life Terrill's books became a foreground in Hollywood, as a bio film about McQueen became a competitive part of entertainment news. As years went on for the film's creation via Terrill's work, actors such as Brad Pitt and Jeremy Renner entered discussions, along with directors James Gray and Steven Soderbergh, with various companies moving to get aboard. Meanwhile, Jeremy Renner continued random talks to produce and lead the movie through his personal enterprise "The Combine". As of 2025, nothing has occurred.

==== Portrait of an American Rebel (re-release) ====
2005 saw the 25th anniversary of Steve McQueen's death with London-based Plexus Publishing's beginning and end chapter updates of Terrill's Steve McQueen: Portrait of an American Rebel.

==== The Last Mile Revisited ====
Over time, Marshall Terrill established a professional association with McQueen's wife Barbara, who described Terrill as her "good friend and confidante". On 1 January 2008 Barbara McQueen and Marshall Terrill together released Steve McQueen: The Last Mile Revisited via Dalton Watson Fine Books. The volume researched McQueen's final years of life near death, containing personal photos taken by Barbara. In 2012 and 2013, photographic works from The Last Mile were displayed in gallery depth by Automuseum PROTOTYP of Hamburg, Germany.

==== A Tribute to the King of Cool/The Life and Legacy of a Hollywood Icon ====
Marshall Terrill oversaw the release of additional Steve McQueen books in 2010: Steve McQueen: A Tribute to the King of Cool, again from Dalton Watson and published 24 March 2010 (McQueen's 80th birthday), along with Steve McQueen: The Life and Legacy of a Hollywood Icon from Triumph Books, a 600+ page mega-bio released November 2010 to celebrate the 30th anniversary of McQueen's death.

==== McQueen's camper truck ====
In September 2015 the "RV Share" site published pictures and a story based on Marshall Terrill's discovery of a vintage camper truck used by McQueen to preserve his anonymity, days prior to his death.

==== Le Mans In the Rearview Mirror ====
In 2017 Marshall Terrill published the coffee table version of Steve McQueen: Le Mans In the Rearview Mirror, another tome from Dalton Watson and written around the infamous 1971 McQueen racing film, with cinema property master Don Nunley.

==== The Salvation of an American Icon ====
On 13 June 2017 both Pastor Greg Laurie and Marshall Terrill released Steve McQueen: The Salvation of an American Icon which magnified McQueen's life in his pursuit of Christianity. From the book, Terrill was executive producer on the feature documentary Steve McQueen: American Icon, narrated by actor Gary Sinise, released nationwide 28 September 2017. The fim grossed US$1.2-million worldwide upon release, in 787 catalogued theatres.

==== In His Own Words ====
In 2020 Terrill released another McQueen coffee table volume, containing 547 photographs and written as if by McQueen himself, name of Steve McQueen: In His Own Words. The year marked the 40th anniversary of Steve McQueen's death.

==== KTLA Terrill interview ====
In 2021 Marshall Terrill gave a lengthy interview with Los Angeles' KTLA regarding his passion for spending part of his lifetime cataloguing the journey of Steve McQueen. Terrill says, "...(McQueen) kind of represents, to me, a kind of a lost American icon that you don't see anymore, a guy who's not very politically correct, a guy who did things his own way." Terrill was also referred to by journalist and Star Trek author Ed Gross as, "...the guy who probably knows McQueen better than anyone, without actually knowing him."

==== Mustangs, Magnums, and Manson's Hitlist ====
In 2024 Marshall Terrill's Portrait of an American Rebel was sourced in the wild Jake Brennan broadcast, Steve McQueen: Mustangs, Magnums, and Manson's Hitlist.

=== Elvis Presley ===
Marshall Terrill has been involved with four substantial books concerning Elvis Presley.

==== The King, McQueen, and the Love Machine ====
On 28 June 2002 publishing company Xlibris (formerly owned by Random House) issued model and actress Barbara Leigh's The King, McQueen, and the Love Machine: My Secret Hollywood Life with Elvis Presley, Steve McQueen and the Smiling Cobra (2002) co-written by Marshall Terrill. In a 2022 interview Terrill said, "Barbara, Steve, and Elvis had a 'don't ask, don’t tell' policy regarding the people they were dating. I have a sneaking suspicion Steve knew she was still seeing Elvis and that Elvis knew she was seeing Steve".

==== Sergeant Presley: Our Untold Story of Elvis' Missing Years ====
On 1 September 2002 Marshall Terrill and his wife Zoe co-authored Sergeant Presley: Our Untold Story of Elvis' Missing Years, along with Elvis Presley's friends Rex and Elisabeth Mansfield. The book was optioned to become a movie with Marshall stating, "It would be great if it was made into a feature film, but in my heart I've always felt it was perfect for television or cable and, of course, would have a great shelf life in the DVD market". To date in 2025, nothing has become of the film or TV project.

==== Elvis: Still Taking Care of Business ====
Terrill became co-writer with actor Sonny West on the bio Elvis: Still Taking Care of Business. Released 1 April 2008 the biography examines and follows Sonny's life for 16 years as Elvis Presley's friend and bodyguard. West and Marshall Terrill spent 36 months on the manuscript. Terrill said the book was an "...exhaustive effort because of the painstaking research that Sonny and I did to ensure the facts were correct".

In September 2011 a film created from Elvis: Still Taking Care of Business was slated for shooting and renamed as Fame and Fortune. With John Scheinfeld as director and adaptive screenwriter, the movie was said to have a 2012 release scheduled with the Gersh agency and entertainment attorney Linda Lichter packaging the project. As of 2025, nothing has materialized.

==== Elvis and the Colonel: An Insider's Look at the Most Legendary Partnership in Show Business ====
On 28 November 2023 Terrill co-wrote with Greg McDonald a new take on Presley's personal history, Elvis and the Colonel: An Insider's Look at the Most Legendary Partnership in Show Business. Published by St. Martin's Press the book resulted in serious reconsiderations of the Col. Parker legend and feedback which also called the book's ideas "contrarian and corrective" later saying that Terrill and McDonald's work "successfully explodes the myth". Marshall Terrill himself said that the Elvis Estate is "...run by a group of people that want to keep the narrative that Elvis was the good guy and Colonel Parker was the bad guy."

=== Johnny Cash: The Redemption of an American Icon ===
Released 20 August 2019 by Salem Books (later phased by Regnery Publishing) Marshall Terrill co-wrote with Greg Laurie, senior pastor of Harvest Christian Fellowship, for Johnny Cash: The Redemption of an American Icon. Terrill's work behind the scenes of Johnny Cash research was broadcast in 2022 and the book well-received followed by a documentary based on its words.

As follows, a Pepperdine California prison reform symposium with a full Johnny Cash University gallery took place 23 January 2023 with Marshall Terrill speaking in depth for a seminar titled "Johnny Cash: Sinner or Saint" about Cash's life and faith.

=== Jay Sebring: Cutting To the Truth ===
Marshall Terrill and Anthony DiMaria co-authored the extensive 558-page investigative crime project Jay Sebring: Cutting To the Truth released by Genius Books on 25 July 2025. Jay Sebring was murdered 9 August 1969 by the Manson Family and has been the extensive subject of his nephew Anthony DiMaria in restoring factual history and removing myth and legend from Sebring's legacy.

=== Pistol Pete ===
In October 2006 Terrill co-authored Maravich with Wayne Federman, an exhaustive biography on basketball's Pete Maravich who died 5 January 1988 from a heart defect. The Pistol Pete book took five years to create and was done with cooperation of Jackie Maravich, the athlete's widow. Focus on the Family/Tyndale Publishing released the paperback version of the book on 1 September 2008 calling it Pete Maravich: The Authorized Biography of Pistol Pete Maravich.

=== The Black Destroyer ===
In 2017 Terrill was co-writer on the celebrated Pulp Hero Press book about "The Black Destroyer" and "hardest puncher in professional boxing" Earnie Shavers. Called Earnie Shavers: Welcome to the Big Time the book deeply covered Shaver's conflicts with the KKK and Muhammad Ali, among others.

=== Various biographies and memoirs ===
On 1 January 1996 Marshall Terrill co-wrote the biography of "hair-slicking hipster" Edd Byrnes (actor from the popular 77 Sunset Strip show) published as "Kookie" No More by Barricade Books.

On 1 January 1998 Marshall Terrill co-wrote with boxer Aaron Pryor the biography The Flight of the Hawk: The Aaron Pryor Story released via Book World, Inc.

In June 2000 Marshall Terrill co-wrote the Ken Norton bio Going the Distance, written with a foreword by "Smokin' Joe" Frazier.

Basketball legend David Thompson worked in September 2003 with Terrill and Sean Stormes on the bio David Thompson: Skywalker.

In 2009 Terrill co-wrote Palm Springs á la Carte: The Colorful World of the Caviar Crowd at Their Favorite Desert Hideaway with longtime Palm Springs philanthropist Mel Haber.

In 2011 Terrill wrote Downtown Phoenix Campus Arizona State University: The First 5 Years which covered the partnership between ASU president Michael Crow and former City of Phoenix Mayor Phil Gordon to complete the university's downtown campus in 18 months.

2014 saw the Dalton Watson publication of Guitar with Wings: A Photographic Memoir, the collaboration between Marshall Terrill and Grammy-winning artist Laurence Juber. The volume harbored stacks of unpublished images of Juber (previously with Wings) together with Paul McCartney.

Terrill's 19th book from 1 January 2015 was Rock and a Heart Place: A Rock 'n' Roller-Coaster Ride from Rebellion to Sweet Salvation, a Christian music anthology chronicling the spiritual lives of rock musicians and co-written with Grammy-winning record producer Ken Mansfield, formerly the manager of The Beatles' Apple Records.

Terrill was published by Triumph Books in 2016 as co-writer for Ruth Pointer on Still So Excited: My Life as a Pointer Sister.

Published by Pulp Hero Press on 16 October 2016 was Marshall Terrill's Zora Folley: The Distinguished Life and Mysterious Death of a Gentleman Boxer, a Kindle eBook and regular version of Chandler, Arizona local Zora Folley's unsolved death and accomplished life.

In 2021 Terrill and Greg Laurie created Billy Graham: The Man I Knew which articulated the life of evangelist Billy Graham. Marshall Terrill afterward released his book Jesus Music: The Visual Story of Redemption as Told By Those Who Lived It which explored the history of contemporary Christian music and was issued together with the 2021 Lionsgate cinema documentary The Jesus Music.

In February 2025 Marshall Terrill co-wrote Smitty: My Marriage to Serial Killer Charles Schmid, the Pied Piper of Tucson with Charles' wife Diane Schmid. The Charles Schmid crime narrative landed extensive coverage along with Terrill's and Diane Schmid's public analysis of the history.

== Personal life ==
In 1999 Marshall Terrill joined East Valley Tribune as a daily reporter.

Marshall Terrill came from a US military Air Force family. Terrill's father, a full Colonel who died at age 83, worked at length with The Pentagon.

== Bibliography ==
- Steve McQueen: Portrait of an American Rebel (1993)
- Edd Byrnes: 'Kookie' No More (1996)
- Flight of the Hawk: The Aaron Pryor Story (1996)
- Ken Norton: Going the Distance (2000) (with Mike Fitzgerald)
- Earnie Shavers: Welcome to the Big Time (2002) (with Mike Fitzgerald)
- The King, McQueen, and the Love Machine: My Secret Hollywood Life with Elvis Presley, Steve McQueen and the Smiling Cobra (2002) (co-written with Barbara Leigh)
- Sergeant Presley (2002) (with Rex and Elisabeth Mansfield and Zoe Terrill)
- David Thompson: Skywalker (2003) (with Sean Stormes)
- Maravich (2006) (with Wayne Federman)
- Steve McQueen: The Last Mile (2006)
- Elvis: Still Taking Care of Business (2007)
- Palm Springs á la Carte: The Colorful World of the Caviar Crowd at Their Favorite Desert Hideaway (2008)
- Steve McQueen: A Tribute to the King of Cool (2010)
- Steve McQueen: The Life and Legacy of a Hollywood Icon (2010)
- Downtown Phoenix Campus Arizona State University: The First 5 Years (2011)
- From Normal School to New American University: A History of the Arizona State University Foundation (2013) (with Dean Smith)
- Guitar With Wings (2014)
- Zora Folley: The Distinguished Life and Mysterious Death of a Gentleman Boxer (2014)
- Rock and a Heart Place (with Ken Mansfield) (2015)
- Still So Excited: My Life as a Pointer Sister (2016) (with Ruth Pointer)
- Steve McQueen: Le Mans in the Rearview Mirror (2017) (with Don Nunley)
- Steve McQueen: The Salvation of an American Icon (2017) (with Greg Laurie)
- Johnny Cash: The Redemption of an American Icon (2019) (with Greg Laurie)
- Steve McQueen: In His Own Words (2020)
- Billy Graham: The Man I Knew (2021) (with Greg Laurie)
- Jesus Music: The Visual Story of Redemption as Told By Those Who Lived It (2022)
- Lennon, Dylan, Alice & Jesus: The Spiritual Biography of Rock 'n' Roll (with Greg Laurie) (2022) Salem Books
- Elvis and the Colonel: An Insider's Look at the Most Legendary Partnership in Show Business (with Greg McDonald) (2023)
- Smitty: My Marriage to Serial Killer Charles Schmid, the Pied Piper of Tucson (with Diane Schmid) (2025)
- Jay Sebring: Cutting to the Truth (with Anthony DiMaria) (2025)
