= Neal Shusterman =

American novelist (born 1962)

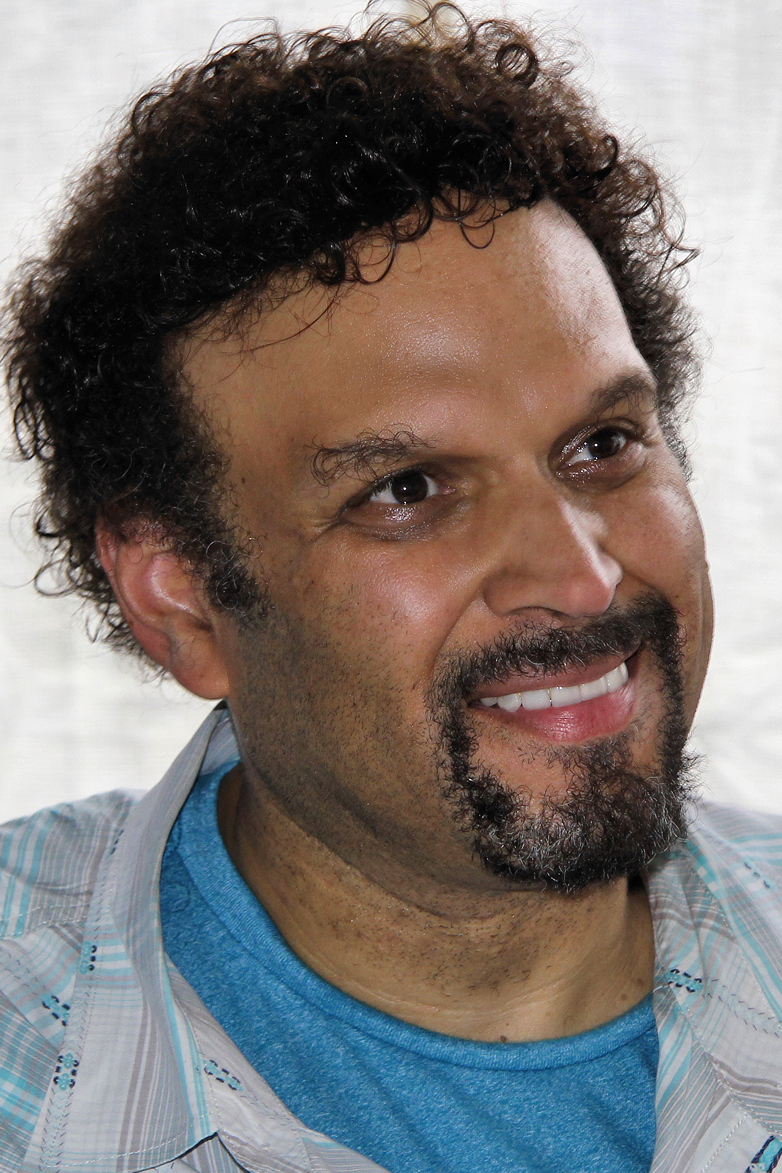
- Shusterman at the 2013 Texas Book Festival
- Born: November 12, 1962 (age 63); New York City, U.S.
- Education: University of California, Irvine
- Occupation: Novelist
- Children: 4
- Writing career
- Language: English
- Period: 1988–present
- Genres: Young adult fiction, dystopian fiction, science fiction
- Notable works: Challenger Deep (2015); Scythe (2016); Thunderhead (2018)
- Notable awards: National Book Award for Young People's Literature (2015); Margaret A. Edwards Award (2024)
- Website: storyman.com

Neal Shusterman (born November 12, 1962) is an American writer of young adult fiction. He won the 2015 National Book Award for Young People's Literature for his book Challenger Deep and his novel, Scythe, was a 2017 Michael L. Printz Honor book.

He won the Margaret Edwards Award in 2024 "honoring his significant and lasting contribution to writing for teens."

== Early life ==
Shusterman was born on November 12, 1962, and raised in Brooklyn, New York City. His family is Jewish.

From a young age, Shusterman was an avid reader. At the age of 16, Shusterman and his family moved to Mexico City. He finished high school there at the American School Foundation and is quoted as saying that "Having an international experience changed my life, giving me a fresh perspective on the world, and a sense of confidence I might not have otherwise." He attended the University of California, Irvine, where he double-majored in psychology and theater, and was also on the varsity swim team.

== Career ==
After college, Shusterman worked as an assistant at the Irvin Arthur Associates, a talent agency in Los Angeles, where Lloyd Segan became his agent. Within a year, Shusterman had his first book deal and a screenwriting job. He lives in Florida.

Shusterman has received numerous honors for his books, including the 2005 Boston Globe–Horn Book Award and 2008 California Young Reader Medal for The Schwa Was Here, as well as the 2015 National Book Award for Challenger Deep. He served as a judge for the PEN/Phyllis Naylor Working Writer Fellowship in 2012. Unwind has won more than 30 awards and is in development with Constantin Film as a television series.

In 2016, it was announced that his novel Scythe is in development with Universal as a feature film. Challenger Deep was acquired by Disney+ in 2019, and Will McCormack has been selected to write the script.

He has been nominated four times (twice in 2019; 2020; 2023) in different categories of the Deutscher Jugendliteraturpreis and won the Youth Jury Prize in 2019. In March 2023, the German translation of the book Roxy, written with his son Jarrod Shusterman, was nominated by the youth jury.

Shusterman has also written for TV, including the Disney Channel Original Movie Pixel Perfect, and episodes of Goosebumps, Animorphs, and R. L. Stine's The Haunting Hour: The Series.

Fellow author Orson Scott Card invited Shusterman to write novels parallel to Ender's Game about other characters from the series, but schedules did not permit it, and Card wrote Ender's Shadow and the subsequent series himself.

== Awards ==
- 2005 Boston Globe–Horn Book Award for The Schwa Was Here
- 2008 California Young Reader Medal for The Schwa Was Here
- 2015 National Book Award for Young People's Literature, Golden Kite Award for Fiction, and Boston Globe–Horn Book Honor for Challenger Deep
- 2017 Michael L. Printz Award Honor for Scythe
- 2019 Young Hoosier Book Award (Middle Grade) for Scythe
- 2019 Deutscher Jugendliteraturpreis for Challenger Deep (German: Kompass ohne Norden), chosen by the youth jury

== Works ==
=== Fiction series ===
==== The N.O.A.H. Files (with Eric Elfman) ====
- I Am the Walrus (2023)
- Shock the Monkey (2024)
- The Dog Days Are Over (2025)

==== The Accelerati trilogy (with Eric Elfman) ====
- Tesla's Attic (2014) ISBN 9781423148036
- Edison's Alley (2015) ISBN 9781423148067
- Hawking's Hallway (2016) ISBN 9781423155218

==== Antsy Bonano ====
- The Schwa Was Here (2004) ISBN 9780756967192
- Antsy Does Time (2008) ISBN 9780525478256
- Ship Out of Luck (2013) ISBN 9780525422266

==== Arc of a Scythe ====
- Scythe (2016)
- Thunderhead (2018)
- The Toll (2019)
- Gleanings: Stories from the Arc of a Scythe (2022)
- Mindworks: An Uncanny Compendium of Short Fiction (2025)
- Rising Thunder: A Prequel to Scythe

==== Dark Fusion ====
- Dread Locks (2005)
- Red Rider's Hood (2005)
- Duckling Ugly (2006)

==== The Shadow Club Duology ====
- The Shadow Club (1988)
- The Shadow Club Rising (2002)

==== The Skinjacker trilogy ====
- Everlost (2006)
- Everwild (2009)
- Everfound (2011)

==== The Star Shards Chronicles ====
- Scorpion Shards (1995)
- Thief of Souls (1999)
- Shattered Sky (2002)

==== The Unwind dystology ====
- Unwind (2007) ISBN 9781416912040
- UnStrung (2012) (short story) ISBN 9781442423664
- UnWholly (2012) ISBN 9781442423671
- UnSouled (2013) ISBN 9781442423695
- UnDivided (2014) ISBN 9781481409759
- UnBound (2015) (short story collection, contains UnStrung)

==== The X-Files ====
- The X-Files Young Adult Series

- 3) Bad Sign (1997) [writing as Easton Royce] novelization of The X-Files episode Syzygy
- 10) Dark Matter (1999) [writing as Easton Royce] novelization of The X-Files episode Soft Light

- The X-Files Young Readers Series

- 8) Voltage (1996) [writing as Easton Royce] novelization of The X-Files episode D.P.O.
- 9) E.B.E. (1996) co-authored with Les Martin [writing as Easton Royce] novelization of The X-Files episode E.B.E.

==== Space: Above and Beyond ====
- 1) The Aliens Approach (1996) [writing as Easton Royce] novelization of the pilot episode of the Space: Above and Beyond TV series
- 3) Mutiny (1996) [writing as Easton Royce] novelization of the Space: Above and Beyond episode, Mutiny

=== Other novels ===
- Dissidents (1989)
- Speeding Bullet (1991)
- What Daddy Did (1991) (later renamed Chasing Forgiveness)
- The Eyes of Kid Midas (1992)
- The Dark Side of Nowhere (1997) ISBN 9780316789073
- Downsiders (1999)
- Full Tilt (2004) ISBN 9780689803741
- Bruiser (2010) ISBN 9780061134081
- Challenger Deep (2015) illustrated by Brendon Shusterman ISBN 9780061134111
- Dry (2018) co-authored with Jarrod Shusterman ISBN 9781481481960
- Game Changer (2021) ISBN 9780061998676
- Roxy (2021) co-authored with Jarrod Shusterman ISBN 9781406392128
- Break to You (2024) co-authored with Debra Young and Michelle Knowlden ISBN 9780062875761
- All Better Now (2025) ISBN 9781534432758

=== Graphic novels ===
- Courage to Dream: Tales of Hope in the Holocaust (2023) Illustrated by Andrés Vera Martínez

=== Picture books ===
- Piggyback Ninja (1994) Illustrated by Joe Boddy

=== Short stories ===
- Resurrection Bay (2013) ISBN 9780062295163 [published only as an ebook]

=== Short story collections ===
- Darkness Creeping: Tales to Trouble Your Sleep (1993)
- Darkness Creeping II: More Tales to Trouble Your Sleep (1995)
- Mindquakes: Stories to Shatter Your Brain (1996)
- Mindstorms: Stories to Blow Your Mind (1996)
- Mindtwisters: Stories to Shred Your Head (1997)
- Mindbenders: Stories to Warp Your Brain (2000)
- Darkness Creeping: Twenty Twisted Tales (2007)
- Violent Ends (2015) co-authored with 17 other authors including, Brendon Shusterman, Shaun David Hutchinson, and Beth Revis
- MindWorks: An Uncanny Compendium of Short Fiction (2025)

=== Games ===
- How to Host a Murder: Roman Ruins (1997)
- How to Host a Murder: The Grapes of Frath (1997)
- How to Host a Teen Mystery: Hot Times at Hollywood High (1997)
- How to Host a Murder: The Good, the Bad, and the Guilty (1998)
- How to Host a Murder: Tragical Mystery Tour (1999)
- How to Host a Teen Mystery: Barbecue with the Vampire (1999)
- How to Host a Murder: Saturday Night Cleaver (2000)
- How to Host a Murder: Maiming of the Shrew (2001)
- How to Host a Teen Mystery: Roswell That Ends Well (2002)
- How to Host a Murder: An Affair to Dismember (2003)

=== Nonfiction ===
- Guy Talk (1987)
- It's Ok to Say No to Cigarettes and Alcohol (1988)
- Neon Angel: The Cherie Currie Story (1989) with Cherie Currie
- Kid Heroes: True Stories of Rescuers, Survivors, and Achievers (1991)

=== Poems ===
- "Shadows of Doubt" (1993)

== Screenwriting credits ==
=== Television ===
- Goosebumps (1996–1998)
- Animorphs (1998)
- The Haunting Hour: The Series (2011)

=== Film ===
- Double Dragon (1994)
- Pixel Perfect (2005)
