= The Shadow Club =

1988 book by Neal Shusterman

- Author: Neal Shusterman
- Language: English
- Genre: Fiction
- Publisher: Penguin Group
- Publication date: 1988
- Media type: Hardcover
- Pages: 217
- ISBN: 0-525-46833-1
- OCLC: 47745943
- LC Class: PZ7.S55987 Sh 2002
- Followed by: The Shadow Club Rising

The Shadow Club is a book written by Neal Shusterman about two middle school students, Jared Mercer and Cheryl Gannett.

== Plot synopsis ==
Cheryl Gannett and Jared Mercer are second best at their school, so they decide to form a club consisting of their school's other second bests; Jason, Karin, Abbie, Darren, and Randall. Their club is called the Shadow Club, consisting of other students who also consider themselves to be "in the shadows" of people who are better than them at the things they are good at. They start out by pulling pranks to humiliate their enemies, the "unbeatable". However, their pranks quickly escalate, to the point of becoming dangerous. In addition, the most recent pranks were not carried out by the Shadow Club at all and the club members believe that they are being framed by Tyson, their school's biggest underachiever and pyromaniac. The pranks climax when Jared's biggest enemy, Austin Pace (nicknamed L'Austin sPace), a student training to be an Olympic racer, is permanently injured. After this event, the members of the Shadow Club gather to discuss their problem and decide that their only solution is to force a confession out of Tyson in the worst way possible; by punching, kicking, and pushing him, and even by trying to drown him. After he almost dies, they let him run off, and return to their meeting place, which they called "Stonehenge." Meanwhile, Jared, who has taken part in half of Tyson's interrogation, discovers that it was not Tyson who pulled the pranks, it was the members of the Shadow Club, each acting independently, so that none of the others knew of their actions, and each of them truly believed that they pulled one prank, but that Tyson did the rest. Realizing their mistake, Jared rushes back to find the members of the club in Stonehenge, all with horrified looks on their faces. They share their mistakes, and here the ones from the Shadow Club that had been tormenting Tyson share what they learned about him; that he is a pyromaniac, and all the school fires had been caused by him. Jared goes over to the lighthouse where Tyson lives to apologize for their mistake. But what he sees is a burning building, and Tyson was no doubt in it. Refusing to turn his back on Tyson, Jared runs into the lighthouse, and manages talk him out of burning to death, with difficulty. The two escape by jumping from a window, into the ocean below, and Jared carries Tyson to shore as he is unable to swim. In the end, he had to admit to the Shadow Club to his parents. After the talk with Mr. Greene, the school's vice principal, Tyson, Jared, and Cheryl join at Stonehenge for a final meeting (the others refused to show). Cheryl gives the charter to Tyson, who tosses it into the flames, and it burns, ending the Shadow Club, but leaving all the members, mostly Jared, with a bad reputation.
