= Spencer Redford =

American actress and singer

- Born: 1982 or 1983 (age 42–43)
- Occupations: Actress, singer
- Years active: 2002–2012

Spencer Redford (born 1982 or 1983) is an American former actress and singer, best known for her role as Loretta Modern in the Disney Channel Original Movie Pixel Perfect.

== Early life ==
Redford graduated from Rochester High School in 2001.

== Career ==
Her other television credits include That's So Raven, Even Stevens, Joan of Arcadia, Arrested Development, Jake in Progress, Judging Amy and The Young and the Restless.

Redford's last acting role was in the 2007 film Look.

== Filmography ==
Year	Title	Role	Notes
2002	Vampire Clan	Jeanine Leclair	Direct-to-video film
2002	Even Stevens	Chris	1 episode
2002	They Shoot Divas, Don't They?	Libby	Made-for-TV film
2002	The Young and the Restless	Caitlin	Unknown number of episodes
2003	That's So Raven	Serena Valentine	1 episode
2003	Joan of Arcadia	Leslie; Sophie (uncredited)	2 episodes
2004	Pixel Perfect	Loretta Modern	Made-for-TV film
2004	Judging Amy	Nicole Phillips	1 episode
2004	The Trail to Hope Rose	Charmaine Stough	Made-for-TV film
2005	Arrested Development	Teen Sally	1 episode
2005	Jake in Progress	Mallory Ward	1 episode
2007	Shanghai Kiss	Jessica	Direct-to-video film
2007	Look	Sherri Van Haften	Theatrical film

== Discography ==
- I Am Spencer (2004), an EP
- Wasted Space (2012)
