= Everfound (novel) =

2011 novel by Neal Shusterman

- First edition
- Author: Neal Shusterman
- Language: English
- Series: Skinjacker Trilogy
- Genre: Fantasy
- Publisher: Simon & Schuster
- Publication date: 2011
- Media type: Print
- Pages: 512
- ISBN: 9781416990499
- Preceded by: Everwild

Everfound is a fantasy novel published in 2011 by Neal Shusterman. It is the third and final book of the Skinjacker trilogy.

== Setting ==
Everlost is the place between life and death that all children or teenagers below the age of 18 end up after getting lost in their journey to the light at the end of the tunnel. Afterlights are unseen by the living world, and cannot interact with the real world unless they are skinjackers. Skinjackers are Afterlights who are in a coma, and can possess the living. Afterlights can sink to the Earth's core if they stay still on living ground, unless it is a "deadspot", a place where someone has died, where the Afterlights don't sink.

== Plot ==
The story continues with Mary Hightower trapped inside a glass coffin while Milos leads Mary's Afterlights and Interlights (souls who are sleeping for nine months before waking up in Everlost) in a train heading west. Meanwhile, Allie the Outcast is strapped on the front of a train. Milos's Afterlights continued on their journey until they are stopped by a church. Milos decides that he, Jill, Moose, and Squirrel will go reaping (an act of skinjacking someone to purposefully kill teens and children and make them citizens of Everlost). Right after they reaped, they met Jix, an afterlight whose specialty is skinjacking animals. Jix, out of curiosity, went along with them to the train. After a while they moved the church out of their way and continued heading west.

Nick (now just a figure made out of chocolate, and doesn't remember a lot about his past) and Mikey McGill continued on their way until they got trapped by Clarence, a scar wraith (a person who can see and touch the living and Everlost worlds, that can extinguish Afterlights with the touch of his Everlost arm.). Nick escaped while Mikey was still trapped, telling Nick to run. Mikey told Clarence everything he knows about Everlost.

Meanwhile, the train that Allie was strapped in traveled to a mansion, a home full of Afterlights called the “Neon Nightmares”. Milos then ordered the conductor to ram into the mansion, thinking it was the same as the church; that it was placed in front of the train tracks and could be moved away by ramming into it. However, they got derailed. Allie was rescued by Jix and gave her a coyote to furjack (skinjacking an animal). The leader of the Neons, called Avalon, ordered his comrades to push Jix down into the center of the Earth; however, Jill offered to trade her coin and Milos' coin for his freedom. She then convinced them that there were more coins, and that she would reveal the location of the coins only if they let her and Jix live. Avalon gave in to her offer, and brought them, the Interlights, and Mary Hightower back to their base in Alamo.

Nick arrived at the derailed train confused. Milos, Moose and Squirrel managed to twist Nick's memory into thinking that he was in love with Jill, and making him slowly forget about Allie. The skinjackers, Nick and the rest of the Afterlights followed the direction the Neons were walking to bring back Mary.

Allie head back to where the train formerly was, then saw Nick's chocolate footprints and followed them. She reached San Antonio and decided to look for Nick there. During her search, she found out that a person named Seth Fellon was skinjacked to set a school on fire, so she helped him break out of prison. While back at Alamo, in the Neon's hideout area, Jix and Jill managed to send Avalon into the light, and led the Neons to the City of Souls, in Mexico.

Nick, Allie, Mikey and Clarence interrupted Milos as he was reaping. Clarence touched Squirrel, causing him to extinguish. All of the Interlights, including Mary, woke up. Mary met Jill and Jix and told her everything that happened. They later reunite with Milos, Moose and the other Interlights. Then set a course to the City of Souls, while Mikey, Allie, Nick and Clarence went to Corpus Christi.

At a bay, Mary and Milos betrayed Jix and let him sink in the ocean, Jill left Milos and Mary because Jix wasn't with them. But Jix furjacked a few sea animals and made his way on land. He later found Jill and met Allie and the others. Jix and Jill decided to help them stop Mary's plans. They split up in teams; Jill going back to Mary to learn the names of the skinjackers, Nick, Mikey and Jix to seek help from the King of the City of Souls, Clarence and Allie to subdue the skinjackers’ bodies using the names Jill gave them. Allie found Milos' body and killed him, therefore relieving him of his skinjacking skills. When Mary found out Milos couldn't skinjack anymore and hence he was useless to her, she ceased to care about him, making him an ordinary Afterlight.

Ever since Allie didn't have any new information about the skinjackers’ names, she decided to interfere with Mary herself. She and Clarence then drove to a huge deadspot, called the Trinity Vortex; where the first nuclear bomb exploded and where the actual bomb existed in Everlost. After a few moments of Allie's plans not working, Mary ordered Milos to touch the scar wraith, knowing he'd oblige as he was still in love with her. After Milos extinguished, a storm appeared both in Everlost and the living world. Mikey, Nick, Jix along with the inhabitants from the City of Souls, and the statue made of coins arrived in the Hindenburg.

By the end, Clarence managed to send nearly every Afterlight into the light, using the bomb and the coin statue. Jix and Jill found each other, and taught the new skinjackers the basics for a while. Mary sunk to the bottom of the earth, Mikey got into the light. Allie skinjacked her own body, and Nick became the “new Mary”, tending the Afterlights until they were ready to go into the light; without of course, Mary's vision.

== Characters ==
- Alexandra "Allie the Outcast" Johnson: A fourteen-year-old girl died in the same car crash as Nick. Allie is brave and "goal" orientated though not a planner. She was reborn nine months later in "Everlost" as an Afterlight. In the first book Everlost, Allie discovers that she has the gifted ability to "possess or skinjack" people. This book continues her quest to stop Mary's plans and save the living and Everlost worlds. After she finished her plans, Allie skinjacks her own body.
- Nicholas "Nick": A fourteen years old half-Japanese boy. He in the same car crash as Allie on the way to a wedding when he died with chocolate on his face; now he is stuck in formal clothes and a chocolate covered mouth for eternity. In Everfound, he joins forces with Allie, Clarence, Mikey, Jix and Jill to stop Mary's plan of ending the living world. By the end of the book, he looks after the afterlights and makes sure they go into the light when the time comes.
- Megan "Mary Hightower" McGill: The self-proclaimed expert on Everlost. She has written many books on living in the world between life and death. She also thinks of herself as the mother of the many children stuck in this world, being one of the oldest inhabitants at fifteen. She died in a green school dress which adds to her motherly appeal. She will do anything to keep the "lost" Afterlights in Everlost. Mary has a lunatic plan of destroying the world and bringing the children into Everlost to "save" them. But after seeing her plan fail, she then willingly let herself sink to the bottom of the earth rather than admitting she was wrong.
- Mikey McGill: The brother of Megan McGill, he is fourteen years old, and is trying to redeem himself after spending nearly 30 years "kidnapping" afterlights after believing a prophecy in a Chinese fortune cookie that in exchange for 1000 souls, he can return to the land of the living. He tries his best to keep from returning to the old ways to please Allie. He accompanies Allie in her request to return to her home to meet her parents one last time. Mikey has the ability to change his form into anything he wishes. Mikey may come off as selfish and proud, but he secretly loves Allie with all his heart. After helping Allie defeat his sister's plan he goes into the light, giving Allie the chance to go back to her own body.
- Milos: A highly skilled Russian skinjacker the age of seventeen that serves Mary. He continues to tend Mary's Afterlights while heading west. He eventually loses his ability to skinjack, and gets extinguished.
- Jill: A skinjacker who worked for Mary. Also known as Jackin' Jill. She has messy and tangled blond hair with nettles in it. Jill is a tough Afterlight that does whatever she wants most of the time. She then met Jix and slowly falls in love with him. She then helps Allie foil Mary's plans.
- Moose: A skinjacker who is permanently in American football gear. His speech is impeded due to the mouthguard he is wearing. He travels with Milos. He loses his ability to skinjack, and falls in an endless loop of playing football all by himself.
- Squirrel: A skinjacker who goes by his name by acting squirrely. He often repeats words more than once. He is the second traveler with Milos, along with Moose. He gets extinguished by Clarence, a scar wraith, which causes all the Interlights to wake up.
- Jix: A skinjacker who possesses animals instead of people. He served the King in the City of Souls, until he went to the bottom of the earth. He meets Jill another skinjacker, and slowly falls in love with her. He decides to help Allie stop Mary's plan. He teachers the new skinjackers basic moves and rules along with Jill for a while.
- Clarence: A scar wraith that helps Allie kill the bodies of the new skinjackers that Mary has. He then helps send nearly every afterlight to the light with the first atomic bomb, and the statue made of coins that can send any Afterlight to where they were going before they arrived in Everlost.
