= The Dark Side of Nowhere =

1997 novel by Neal Shusterman

- Author: Neal Shusterman
- Language: English
- Published: 1997
- Publication place: United States
- Media type: Print
- Pages: 184
- ISBN: 978-0-316-78907-3

The Dark Side of Nowhere is a children's book written by Neal Shusterman and published by Little Brown and Company in 1997. It was released in paperback and on audio cassettes.

== Plot ==
After his friend, Ethan, dies, Jason Miller realizes he hasn't been feeling like himself. More than that, much of his town is behaving strangely, including his parents.

It turns out Jason's town has been infiltrated by alien invaders called Warrior-Fools, and Jason himself is a second generation invader. Jason is outfitted with an otherworldly power glove and called upon to lead the rest of the town's second generation. If that wasn't enough, Ethan's not dead, but merely the first of the Warrior-Fools to break through his human shell.

With misgivings about his newly discovered destiny and imminent transformation, Jason balks at transforming his human girlfriend Paula into a Warrior-Fool and breaks up with her instead. Jason uses a vial of transformation serum to try to remain human as long as possible.

Jason is revealed as a traitor and deposed as leader, leading to a confrontation at the alien base and a runaway ship crash. When Jason wakes up, he finds that he's lost his battle to stay human, but also that his parents have been secretly working to undermine the invasion.

== Awards and honors ==
- 2001: Illinois Rebecca Caudill Young Reader's Book Award List
- 2001: Nebraska Golden Sower Award Honor
- 1999: Texas Lone Star Reading List
- 1998: Maine Student Book Award List
- 1998: American Library Association YALSA "Best Book for Young Adults"
- 1998: American Library Association YALSA "Quick Pick" – TOP TEN LIST
