= Unwind (novel) =

2007 novel by Neal Shusterman

- Original hardcover edition
- Author: Neal Shusterman
- Cover artist: Daniel Roode
- Language: English
- Genre: Science fiction, biopunk, adventure, dystopian fiction
- Publisher: Simon & Schuster
- Publication date: 2007
- Publication place: United States
- Media type: Hardback, paperback
- Pages: 335

Unwind is a dystopian novel by Neal Shusterman. Unwind takes place in a future version of the United States. After the Second Civil War ("The Heartland War") was fought over abortion, a compromise was reached, "The Bill of Life," a set of constitutional amendments allowing parents to sign an order for their children between the ages of 13 and 18 to be "unwound" — often taken to "harvest camps." The child's body would be dismembered and used as surgical or cosmetic transplants, essentially making conventional surgery redundant. The reasoning is that since 99.44% of the child's body is used, Unwinds do not technically die because their individual body parts live on.

Unwind was met with positive reception upon release, with praise focusing on the novel's immersive environment and sociological implications. A film adaptation of Unwind was in production, but Shusterman announced in January 2020 that a television series would be developed instead. A second novel titled UnWholly was released in August 2012, a third titled UnSouled in December 2013, and a fourth titled UnDivided in October 2014. A novella, UnStrung, was also published. UnBound is the most recent addition to the Unwind series and was written by Neal Shusterman, Michelle Knowlden, Jarrod Shusterman, Terry Black, and Brendan Shusterman. It was published December 15, 2015, by Simon & Schuster and is a collection of novellas that explore the secrets and lost stories of the Unwind world.

== Summary ==
=== Background ===
In a near-future dystopian United States, the conflict between the pro-choice and pro-life movements escalated into a second civil war. In response, the government fought against both sides to stop the war from escalating and closed down schools and other services for children in order to do so. Children, teenagers, and young adults began protesting and rioting against the actions and nearly toppled the government in an event known as the Teen Uprising. At the same time, technology in organ transplants advanced to allow all organs and body parts to be harvested from any acceptable body and used by other bodies without rejection.

As a way to end the war, the government passed a set of amendments known as The Bill of Life. Abortion is banned, "storking" (the act of abandoning newborn babies to be left in someone else's care) becomes an accepted practice, and the Unwind Accord allows families to have their children between the ages of 13 and 18 undergo unwinding as an option. Unwinding is justified as legal because the patient is kept alive during the entire process and after harvesting. Many parents use it to get rid of unwanted, storked children who have reached 13.

=== Plot summary ===
The story centers around three teenagers who have been scheduled to be unwound: Connor Lassiter, Risa Ward, and Levi "Lev" Jedediah Calder. Unwind is written from multiple perspectives, with each chapter being from the point of view of a different character or theme.

Connor is a sixteen-year-old delinquent who discovers his parents signed an order for him to be unwound. When his attempt at running away gets him cornered by a Juvey-cop, a law-enforcement officer who serves to round up teenagers registered to be unwound, he holds another teenager (who turns out to be Lev) hostage, shoots the cop with his own tranquilizer gun, and causes a massive pile-up. Connor's actions result in him being named by the media as the "Akron AWOL" due to the location, and earns him a dangerous reputation. At the same time, Risa, a fifteen-year-old orphan, is on her way to becoming unwound in order to cut her state home's costs. She used the traffic jam Connor caused to escape from the bus she was being transported on. Lev, a thirteen-year-old who was raised to believe it was his duty to be a "tithe" (a child chosen to be unwound as an act of charity or service to religion) for his family, is also on his way to be unwound. Lev decides to escape the scene with Connor and Risa, pretending to be on their side, but still wanting to be unwound due to his coercive upbringing.

Connor picks up a storked newborn girl, who they later named Didi, after remembering a past experience his family had with storking. Risa grudgingly agrees to take the baby in with the group after they are caught holding the baby. The three enter a nearby high school to hide, and Lev attempts to escape by turning himself and the other two in to the school authorities. Feeling guilty about his actions, Lev decides to escape and pulls the fire alarm to help the other two escape as the police begin to arrive. Risa and Connor are found by a school teacher named Hannah who helps them escape and tells them to find an antique store owner named Sonia. Sonia runs a safe house for runaway teenagers signed to be unwound, or "unwinds." There, Connor and Risa meet Hayden Upchurch, a teen whose parents decided to have him unwound rather than let the other have custody over him after their divorce; Mai, a girl whose parents signed her due to the excess of girls in her family; Zachary, who is nicknamed "Mouth Breather" or "Emby" due to his asthma; and Roland Taggart, a bully with a tiger shark tattoo. Before the group is to be shuttled to the next safe house, Sonia has each teenager write a letter to someone they love. The letters would be sent a year after their eighteenth birthday. Hannah decides to take in Didi, and the group is cycled through different safe houses before finally being sent to a warehouse that serves as the final safe house.

Meanwhile, Lev encounters another teenager named Cyrus "CyFi" Finch, who teaches Lev street smarts. Lev learns that CyFi struggles with compulsive stealing, or kleptomania. The struggle comes from Tyler Walker, an unwound teenager who had part of his brain transplanted in CyFi and is unaware that he has been unwound. As a result, CyFi constantly engages in Tyler's old habits and experiences Tyler's emotions spontaneously. Lev helps CyFi and Tyler find peace by allowing Tyler to speak to his parents once again through CyFi, with Cyrus dubbing himself Cy-Ty as a way to represent both him and Tyler. CyFi is reunited with his parents, and Lev runs away once again (Lev's journey between CyFi and the Graveyard is further explored in the short story UnStrung).

Risa and Connor realize Roland manipulates, lies, and uses fear as a means to get what he wants and create chaos. The two teens get sent to a large warehouse, full of other unwinds as a final stop on their journey. Here, they see about 60 other kids who are also being shuffled between safe homes. The teens are forming friendships and Roland is falling into a place of power. Roland and Connor become enemies in a power struggle. Roland feigns an attempt to rape Risa in the bathroom, hoping to bait Connor into a fight. His attempt fails, and Connor continues to avoid fighting him. The group of teenagers eventually make it to the 'Graveyard', an aircraft graveyard run by the 'Admiral', a former Navy officer called Admiral Dunfee. There, teenagers are taught skills and put to work until they turn eighteen or need to be transported elsewhere. Roland, with a new motive to turn the Graveyard against the Admiral and become the new leader, spreads rumors that the Admiral's unwound son 'Humphrey Dunfee' is being rebuilt from the parts of the teenagers at the Graveyard. Connor confronts The Admiral and discovers that the rumors about him are false. The Admiral explains that he had been one of the founders of the Bill of Life and the concept of unwinding. Because of this, when he himself had a troubled teenage son called Harlan, expectations were high that he have his own son unwound. He did so but later regretted it, creating the Graveyard as repayment for his mistake. The Graveyard is also acknowledged by the government as a compromise to keep runaways off the streets while allowing them to not be unwound. Connor and Risa decide to side with the Admiral, with Connor serving as his spy. Suspicions against The Admiral's motives led to the death of the 'Goldens', a group of five teenagers who help the Admiral run The Graveyard, and Connor suspects Roland to be responsible. Lev arrives at the Graveyard and reunites with Connor and Risa. However, Lev decides to join a secret group within The Graveyard dedicated to destroying unwinding facilities, known as harvest camps, rather than work in the Graveyard until he is eighteen. Lev becomes a 'clapper', a suicide bomber injected with liquid explosive that can be detonated by clapping, alongside two other Unwinds, Blaine and Mai. Clappers have a unique mindset revolving around chaos and destruction, and are hinted at being run by a wider terrorist organisation.

A riot ensues when the bodies of the Goldens are discovered, and the Admiral has a heart attack during the resulting chaos. Connor eventually calms the riot down and forces Roland to help him fly the Admiral to the hospital. Risa joins them, and all three teenagers are arrested and taken away to a harvest camp. Risa is forced to play in the harvest camp's band and plays for every teenager about to undergo the procedure. Connor's reputation as Akron AWOL causes the staff to treat him with disrespect and contempt. Lev enters the harvest camp as a tithe, secretly ready to detonate. However, he discovers Connor is also at the camp, and the time planned to self detonate is after Connor is scheduled to be unwound. He meets with Mai and Blaine, who were also sent to the camp, and convinces them to carry out their plan before Connor's unwinding. Roland is unwound first due to his rare blood type, and the staff prepare to take Connor. Mai and Blaine detonate themselves as Connor enters the procedure room. The explosion causes the building Risa and the band were on to collapse, and Connor is knocked unconscious as well. Lev backs out of detonating and helps the survivors escape before turning himself in to the police.

Connor wakes up in the hospital, and a nurse saves him from being unwound by deliberately misidentifying him as a young security guard killed in the explosion. Connor ends up with a new eye and arm against his will and learns that the arm came from Roland's body.

Risa ends up being paralyzed from the hip down and unable to walk. She refuses to replace her spine as disabled people cannot be unwound, and she doesn't want to receive unwound parts. Connor and Risa reunite and return to The Graveyard to help the thousands of unwinds that need asylum.

Lev, having been a clapper, is also excluded from becoming unwound. The liquid explosive has damaged his organs, making them unsuitable for transplantation. His family refuses to take him back, and his older brother Marcus, who spoke out against having Lev being unwound as a tithe in the beginning, is willing to take custody of him. It is revealed that CyFi is leading a movement against unwinding, and campaigning for the reduction of unwinding age from 18 to 17.

The Admiral, weak from the heart attack, refuses to receive an unwound heart and resigns from his position at The Graveyard. During his career, The Admiral used his status to find who received his son's body parts. The Admiral manages to contact most of the people who ended up with one of his son's parts. It is revealed that Roland's rumor of 'Humphrey Dunfee' being remade from the parts of kidnapped teenagers is actually a reunion of anyone who received his unwound parts. The recipients, including Emby, develop a shared mind and Harlan's consciousness speaks to the Admiral through the group.

== Characters ==
- Connor Lassiter (the "Akron AWOL") is a sixteen-year-old teenager whose parents signed the unwind order due to his delinquent behavior. His escape and shooting of a Juvey-cop with a tranquilizer gun earned him the nickname "Akron AWOL," with stories that continue to become more elaborate with each telling. Throughout the story, Connor changes from being an unexperienced teenager with almost zero survival experience to a person who rationalizes and contains his rage when necessary. Connor develops a relationship with Risa and befriends Lev despite their initial meeting. Alongside Risa, Connor sides with the Admiral during their stay at The Graveyard and even takes the Admiral to the hospital despite knowing that he will be turned in to authorities to be unwound. Connor takes over as the new leader at the end of the novel. He served as a mechanic during his stay at The Graveyard.
- Risa Ward is a fifteen-year-old teenage resident at a state orphanage in Ohio and was scheduled to be unwound to cut orphanage costs. Extremely smart, resourceful, and tough, Risa's skills help Connor and Lev survive and escape many sticky situations. Her skills with healing and taking care of children allows her to work as the chief medic at the Graveyard, and her piano skills forces her to be a part of the band at the harvest camp when she was turned in. At the end of the book, Risa is paralyzed by the explosion and refuses treatment in order to not be unwound and because she doesn't want to have a new spine from an Unwind. She rekindles her relationship with Connor and joins him at The Graveyard when he became the new leader.
- Levi "Lev" Jedediah Calder is a teenage tithe chosen by his family to be unwound as a religious sacrifice. Initially willing to serve his duty, his experience with Connor helped change his mind about his purpose in life. Lev, being raised in a religious and seemingly loving family, begins to show resentment towards his parents as the story continues. Despite his rocky start with Connor, he eventually befriends him and Risa. He overcomes his sheltered lifestyle with the help of CyFi's teachings, which led him to become a clapper. However, he refuses to clap and gains national attention as "the clapper who didn't clap" after his arrest.
- Cyrus "CyFi" Finch is a fifteen-year-old teenager who befriends Lev after Lev is separated from Risa and Connor. CyFi teaches Lev street smarts and Lev helps CyFi gain closure due to his temporal lobe belonging to an unwound teenager named Tyler Walker. CyFi is described as 'umber', a word used to replace 'Black' when referring to race ('sienna' is used instead of White, and Native Americans are named 'ChanceFolk' because of their history running casinos).
- Admiral Dunfee "the Admiral" is a man who used to work for what remained of the United States Navy during the Heartland War. As a way to make up for unwinding his son, he creates the Graveyard to provide runaway teenagers a safe haven in an airplane junkyard. After a heart attack and his refusal to take a new heart from an unwound teenager, the Admiral resigns his position as leader of the Graveyard and gives the role to Connor. His action of unwinding his son led to the urban legend of "Humphrey Dunfee".
- Roland Taggart is a violent teenager Connor and Risa encounter. Roland serves as a foil to Connor, clashing with him whenever he could and nearly kills him when he discovers Connor is the Akron AWOL. A malicious and manipulative character, Roland stops at nothing to create chaos or gain power. Through Roland's unwinding procedure, the process is revealed. Roland ends up being unwound before the explosion, and Connor ends up receiving his arm and eye.
- Hayden Upchurch is one of the teenagers in Sonia's basement. Philosophical and sarcastic, he becomes friends with Connor during their time at the Graveyard. Hayden works in food distribution and eventually works in communications when Connor becomes the new leader. Connor entrusts him to take charge of the camp near the climax while Connor goes to deal with more important matters.
- Sonia is an older lady that runs an antique shop that is secretly a safe house for runaways. Connor and Risa were told by the schoolteacher Hannah to go to her for help, and she leads them down to the basement before they are taken to another location. Sonia makes the runaways write a letter to their parents and holds onto them until a year after they turn eighteen. If they do not arrive to take their letters by then, she will send them out to their parents.
- Emby (or Zachary) is a boy with a single lung given to him by an already unwound kid due to him having an illness that required him to have a lung transplant. His parents could only afford one lung that had asthma, which results in Emby having asthma. He is packed in a crate with Connor and Hayden to be transported from the warehouse to the Graveyard. At the end of the novel it is revealed that the singular lung that Emby has was from the Admiral's unwound son, Harlan Dunfee.
- Harlan Dunfee is the son of the Admiral. He was unwound by his father around the time the Admiral had helped create the idea of unwinding a child. The Admiral and his wife gathered all the people who got a part of Harlan into one spot in their backyard. Then something magical occurred: the people who had Harlan Dunfee's body parts started acting as one human being, each speaking one at a time to make complete sentences. The Admiral and his wife were finally able to speak to their son again.

== Development ==
Shusterman says that the idea for Unwind came to him from three separate news articles. The first was from a scientist that claimed that "within our lifetime, 100% of the human body will be viable for transplant" without rejections. The second was a report on teenagers residing in Britain labeled as "feral" and how some opinions on those teenagers include an indifference in having them killed for the sake of society. The last was an article studying the trends of voting in America and the number one topic that determine's a candidate's vote is the voter's view on abortion.

Shusterman explains that Unwind is a novel that imagines not a technological future, but a sociological future. There are mentions of slightly more advanced technology than today, such as rejection-free transplantation, advanced holograms and pigment injections to cosmetically change eye colors, but much of the novel is set to be a near future of America.

== Film adaptation ==
In 2010, the film rights to Unwind were sold to Tasty Films and Contagion Film. Casting has yet to begin, but as of April 15, 2012, the film has moved into the early stages of pre-production. Novel-author Neal Shusterman drafted the screenplay. On December 9, 2012, The Hollywood Reporter reported that Constantin Film had picked up the film rights to the whole series. In January 2020, Shusterman announced that production of the film was not going well but that there would be a television series.

== Critical reception ==
- The New York Times reviewer Ned Vizzini gave an approving review, claiming that "the power of the novel lies in what it doesn't do: come down explicitly on one side or the other."
- VOYA also gave a positive review: "The novel follows three protagonists who are attempting to 'kick-AWOL' and survive to eighteen to escape their unwindings: Connor, the rebellious teen; Risa, a ward of the state being unwound because of budget cuts; and Lev, a tithe born as an unwind sacrifice. The novel asks two questions: When does a life have value? Who determines whether it is worth keeping? Unfortunately, who is unwound and who gets which 'parts' is often determined by socio-economic status. In addition, parents seem to shamelessly unwind their children for typical teen frustration and rebellion. Betrayal by parents and the system is a horrifying truth for the protagonists. As such, there are many passages that are difficult to read either for their heartrending nature or their shocking specifics, particularly the detailed 'harvest' of a well-known character. Poignant, compelling, and ultimately terrifying, this book will enjoy popularity with a wide range of readers beyond its science-fiction base."
- The School Library Journal gave Unwind a STARRED REVIEW: "...There is evenhanded, thoughtful treatment of many issues, including when life starts and stops, consciousness, religion, free will, law, trust and betrayal, suicide bombers, and hope. Initially, the premise of parents dismantling their children is hard to accept; however, readers are quickly drawn into the story, which is told in a gripping, omniscient voice. Characters live and breathe; they are fully realized and complex, sometimes making wrenchingly difficult decisions. This is a thought-provoking, well-paced read that will appeal widely, especially to readers who enjoy Scott Westerfeld's Uglies (2005)..."
- TeensReadToo.com also provided a favorable review: "In his chilling new novel, Neal Shusterman paints a picture of a world where there aren't any cures and doctors, just surgeons and replacements. Three unwanted teenagers face a fate worse than death—unwinding. Their bodies will be cut up, and every part of them used, from their brains to their toes. But if they can stay out of the authorities' clutches until the age of eighteen, they just might survive.... The most frightening science fiction novels are always the ones that are most similar to our world. Shusterman doesn't fail to describe how a wrong solution to a modern issue can affect generations to come. Thought provoking, terrifying, and almost inconceivable, UNWIND will keep you reading late into the night."

== Sequels ==
Unwind is the first book in a four-book series. A sequel, entitled UnWholly, was released on August 26, 2012. A third installment, titled UnSouled, was released on October 15, 2013. The last book is Undivided and was published on October 14, 2014.

A novella entitled UnStrung, written by Neal Shusterman and Michelle Knowlden, was released on July 24, 2012. UnStrung is a companion story, set within Unwind and follows the events that led Lev to become a clapper. The story picks up shortly after Lev and CyFi part ways, as he finds himself on a Native American (or ChanceFolk) reservation. UnStrung was later collected in UnBound, a collection of short stories and novellas, which was released on December 15, 2015. The author says that this might be one of his most favorite books to write.
