= Scythe (novel) =

2016 novel by Neal Shusterman

- Author: Neal Shusterman
- Cover artist: Kevin Tong
- Language: English
- Series: Arc of a Scythe
- Genre: Science fiction; biopunk; adventure; dystopia; dystopian fiction
- Publisher: Simon & Schuster
- Publication date: November 22, 2016
- Publication place: United States
- Media type: Print (hardback, paperback)
- Pages: 443
- ISBN: 9781442472433
- Followed by: Thunderhead

Scythe is a 2016 young adult novel by Neal Shusterman and is the first in the Arc of a Scythe series. In the far future, death, disease, and unhappiness have been virtually eliminated due to advances in technology, and a benevolent artificial intelligence known as the Thunderhead peacefully governs a united Earth. To replicate natural death and keep population growth in check, a group of humans known as Scythes are mandated to kill.

== Background ==
Author Neal Shusterman had written multiple teen dystopia fiction novels and wanted to create something that was a "truly perfect world" along with its consequences. Shusterman explained that within this "perfect" world, where even death had been conquered, he realized that humanity would need to take on the role of sole distributor if nature was not doing so. He said that he "envisioned a world where a Jedi-like order" would be the ones responsible for population control.

== Plot ==
The novel happens after the Mortal Age, where deceased people may be revived and all information is stored in an omnipotent and benevolent AI called the Thunderhead who administers all of the world's essential functions. To keep control of the population, a pseudo-monastic order called the "Scythedom" is deputized with killing, or "gleaning", a quota of people every year, as the Thunderhead refuses to do so believing the acts of creating and destroying human life should only be within the powers of humanity. Members of the Scythedom use the honorific of "Scythe" to represent their role as tools of this governing body.

Sixteen-year-old Citra Terranova and Rowan Damisch meet Scythe Michael Faraday, who takes them in as apprentices. They live with Faraday and are instructed on the moral and practical expectations of a scythe, including the act of gleaning, providing consolation to those affected by the deceased's gleaning, philosophical introspection about their duties. After four months, Citra and Rowan are brought to a conclave, a convention of Scythes from a large area. They take their tests, in which they both fail. At the end of Conclave, a Scythe named Goddard proposes that only one of them may become a Scythe, and that the other would be gleaned, on the grounds that no Scythe has ever taken more than one apprentice at a time. Faraday objects, but it is enacted.

Alarmed by this development Scythe Faraday gleans himself, a euphemism for suicide, in an attempt to release Citra and Rowan from their apprenticeship. However, this fails and Rowan and Citra are assigned new masters who they will continue their apprenticeships under. Rowan is assigned to the cruel Scythe Robert Goddard while Citra is assigned to Scythe Marie Curie a friend and former apprentice of Scythe Faraday.

Rowan's experiences Scythe Goddard's extravagant lifestyle and harsh training. Unlike Faraday, Goddard enjoys killing and stages mass gleanings. Citra continues her searching for evidence that Faraday was murdered, combing through the Thunderhead’s “back-brain” (an unsorted repository of all its knowledge). She begins to suspect Curie may have had something to do with Faraday’s death after being presented with a passage from Faraday’s journal that insinuates he feared for his life. Scythe Curie explains that back when she was a junior Scythe, she developed a crush on Faraday. About fifty years later, the two became lovers until they were discovered by the Scythedom and forced to break things off.

Citra and Rowan do not meet again until the next Conclave, where they are tested by fighting each other. Both apprentices attempt to throw the match, but then Rowan is disqualified killing Citra. Later, Citra is convicted of the murder of Scythe Faraday, and jumps out a window. While she is “dead-ish,” the Thunderhead gives Citra the name “Gerald Van Der Gans” and tells her he is related to Scythe Faraday’s death, eventually tracking down Gerald, only to learn he is Scythe Faraday, who faked his death in an attempt to release Citra and Rowan from their obligation to glean one another. Meanwhile, Goddard and his junior Scythes attack a Tonist monastery. Rowan sets fire to the monastery, (burning is one of the few ways to render someone truly dead), tracks down Goddard within, and beheads him.

At the next conclave, Scythe Goddard and his apprentices’ deaths are treated as a tragic accident, and the apprentices are given a final test. Citra becomes a Scythe, choosing teal robes and Anastasia Romanov as her Patron Historic. Her first assignment is to glean Rowan. However, she pretends to accidentally grant him immunity for a year when his DNA touches her Scythe ring, and he escapes the conclave with help from Scythe Faraday. In the epilogue, Scythe Anastasia remarks on the recent stories of a rogue Scythe who hunts down corrupt and unworthy Scythes, preventing them from being revived by burning their bodies.

== Characters ==
- Citra Terranova – An apprentice Scythe, age 16, who is trained by Scythe Faraday and later Scythe Curie, chosen for her outspokenness and honesty. At the end of the story, upon her ordination as a Scythe, she adopts the name Scythe Anastasia, after Grand Duchess Anastasia Nikolaevna of Russia.
- Rowan Damisch – An apprentice Scythe trained by Scythe Faraday and later Scythe Goddard, chosen for his empathy and courage. At the end of the story he becomes known as Scythe Lucifer, taking the name from the biblical fallen angel, and operates as an unordained scythe who gleans corrupt scythes.
- Scythe Faraday – A Scythe who is the mentor to both Citra and Rowan and was well respected by the Old Guard. He gleans fairly by attempting to mimic Mortal Age death statistics. He is named after English physicist Michael Faraday.
- Scythe Curie – A Scythe who tests the Apprentices at their first Conclave and later becomes Citra's mentor. A legendary figure nicknamed "The Grand Dame of Death," she is wise, reflective, and opinionated. She is named after Polish-French physicist Marie Curie.
- Scythe Goddard – A Scythe known for conducting mass gleanings and for an opulent lifestyle who later becomes Rowan's mentor. Charismatic yet narcissistic, he served as the effective leader of the New Order. He is named after American physicist Robert H. Goddard.
- Scythe Volta – A junior Scythe serving under Scythe Goddard privately disgusted by the mass slaughter by Scythe Goddard and the conduct of his peers. He is named after Italian physicist Alessandro Volta.
- Scythe Chomsky – A junior Scythe serving under Scythe Goddard who specializes in the use of flamethrowers. He is brutish and takes pleasure in carrying out mass gleanings. He is named after American public intellectual Noam Chomsky.
- Scythe Rand – A Scythe who is extremely loyal to Scythe Goddard and revels in death just as much as her mentor does. She is named after Russian-American writer Ayn Rand.
- High Blade Xenocrates – The leader of the MidMerican Scythedom, the former mentor of Scythe Goddard, and the father of Esme. He is named after Greek philosopher Xenocrates.
- Esme – The illegitimate daughter of High Blade Xenocrates. Taken hostage by Scythe Goddard to gain leverage over Xenocrates, she is talkative and friendly, takes a liking to Rowan, and enjoys playing games with him.
- Thunderhead – A highly intelligent and neutral computer system that governs all aspects of life on Earth. It can not directly intervene in Scythedom affairs, but expresses worry about the Scythedom's direction, warning Citra about it.

== Reception ==
Michael Berry of Common Sense Media gave the book four stars out of five, calling it a "chilling concept fuels sci-fi thriller about life and death." Kirkus Reviews called the book "a thoughtful and thrilling story of life, death, and meaning" as Shusterman made "dark tale thrusts realistic, likable teens into a surreal situation and raises deep philosophic questions". Andrea Brown of Publishers Weekly described it as "powerful tale is guaranteed to make readers think deeply".

In 2019, the book was selected as the Barnes & Noble Young Adult Book Club pick. In 2021, Scythe was included on Time's list of the "100 Best YA Books of All Time," with Peter Allen Clark writing that the novel explores mortality, sacrifice, and the responsibilities of growing up, "offering young readers a thrilling and thought-provoking story."

== Adaptation ==
In May 2016, it was announced that Universal Pictures bought the film rights to the Arc of a Scythe series and planned to adapt Scythe, with Scott Stuber and Dylan Clark as producers and Trevor Engelson attached. In April 2017, Josh Campbell and Matt Stuecken, the writers of 10 Cloverfield Lane, were hired to adapt the book into a screenplay. Television writer Sera Gamble originally wrote the script, but left in 2020 and was replaced by Gary Dauberman. In November 2022, the project began redrafting with a new writer, with filmmaker Steven Spielberg becoming involved.
