= Pixel Perfect (film) =

2004 TV movie

- Promotional advertisement
- Genre: Music
- Screenplay by: Neal Shusterman
- Story by: Alan Sacks
- Directed by: Mark Dippé
- Starring: Ricky Ullman; Leah Pipes; Spencer Redford
- Theme music composer: Phil Marshall
- Original language: English

Production
- Producer: Don Schain
- Cinematography: Rodney Charters
- Editor: Debra Light
- Running time: 85 minutes
- Production company: Alan Sacks Productions
- Budget: $4 million

Original release
- Network: Disney Channel
- Release: January 16, 2004

Pixel Perfect is a 2004 American science fiction comedy film released as a Disney Channel Original Movie. It aired in the United States on January 16, 2004, and in the United Kingdom on January 21, 2004.

== Plot ==
Teenager Roscoe is trying to help his best friend, Samantha. Sam's band, the Zetta Bytes, is struggling. Despite her vocal talents and guitar skills, Sam is told that she needs to dance in order for their band to succeed. Roscoe uses his father's computerized holographic equipment to create a sentient, autonomous humanoid hologram called Loretta to dance for the band.

At their first gig, a school dance, Loretta is a big hit with the audience. The entire band loves her, except for Sam, who is jealous of Loretta's "perfection," and suspects that Roscoe likes Loretta more than her. Despite her feelings, Sam agrees to take care of Loretta to keep Roscoe's father from finding and deleting her. The Zetta Bytes second performance goes well - until the very end when Loretta starts to lose her pattern, and the crowd realizes she is a hologram. After a moment of silence, the crowd erupts in applause. The novelty of a holographic rockstar catapults the Zetta Bytes to fame. Sam becomes jealous of the attention Loretta is receiving while Loretta struggles with her identity as a software computer program and hologram. She wants to experience life as a real human being. After a major argument with Roscoe, Loretta escapes into the internet, and emails herself to Sam's computer. Roscoe becomes frantic, and rushes to Sam's place for help.

During which, Sam confronts him on his real feelings for Loretta. Sam reminds him that Loretta is not real. When Roscoe rebuffs her statement asking "What is real, anyway?" Sam responds by stating that she is real and she has always been there. Sam then kisses Roscoe, but when he does not respond to her affection, Sam is left hurt. She gives him Loretta and leaves. Later on, Roscoe realizes that Sam was right and soon realizes he may return his feelings for Sam.

Roscoe and his father attend a meeting with Harshtone Records, the company that is recording The Zetta Bytes's first CD. Harshtone informs Roscoe that they have decided to team up with Skygraph, his father's company, and make more holographic rock stars. But when Roscoe realizes that they are planning to rob the holograms of their individuality, he argues that Loretta is not just a computer program, but a sentient, autonomous person with a mind and will of her own sensations, thoughts, personality, feelings, and emotions. Despite Roscoe's father siding with him, Loretta is taken from them. At the last moment Daryl Fibbs, an employee at Harshtone, has a change of heart and decides that every performer, including holograms like Loretta, should have a choice. He gives her the option to stay at Harshtone or escape into the internet. Loretta goes into the internet a second time, and Fibbs quits Harshtone.

The Zetta Bytes cannot find Loretta before their next concert. Sam tries to replace Loretta on stage, but falls, slipping into a coma. When Loretta comes back out of the web and sees that Sam is unconscious, she enters Sam's brain through an EEG machine in an effort to help her. She arrives in Sam's mind, finding Sam caught in her own depression. Loretta shows Sam that she hates that everyone thinks she is perfect, and that she envies Sam's humanity. They discover that there is only enough room for one of them in Sam's brain at a time. Sam wakes from her coma, with Loretta inside of her mind, in a real body for the first time. Loretta steps outside into the rain, understanding that this situation must stop immediately after realizing how far the events have progressed. Sam is struck by lightning, and when she awakens, it seems that Loretta has fled her brain and is no longer there as a forever damaged hologram, forever in Roscoe's computer as an AI program.

Sam sings about Loretta being permanently nonexistent during the Zetta Bytes' closing show. She and Roscoe have started dating. The group discovers there was an additional person singing the chorus after Sam has finished singing. Roscoe remarks that The Zetta Bytes have a guardian angel after seeing a glimpse of Loretta in the limelight.

== Cast ==
- Raviv Ullman as Roscoe
- Leah Pipes as Samantha
- Spencer Redford as Loretta Modern
- Chris Williams as Daryl Fibbs
- Porscha Coleman as Rachel
- Tania Gunadi as Cindy
- Brett Cullen as Xander
- Nate Stevens as Max McAllister
- Joyce Cohen as Dr. McAllister
- Anthony DiMaria as Weldon Giles
- Max Robinson as Moxley
- Britani Bateman as Host

== Soundtrack ==
Pixel Perfect

Soundtrack album by Various artists
- Released: January 13, 2004
- Genre: Music
- Length: 26:17
- Label: Walt Disney Records

On January 13, 2004, the soundtrack to Pixel Perfect was released on CD by Walt Disney Records. The CD contains eight tracks as follows:

Track listing

1. "Perfectly" - performed by Huckapoo (3:39)
2. "Nothing's Wrong with Me" - performed by the Zetta Bytes (3:00)
3. "Notice Me" - performed by the Zetta Bytes (3:34)
4. "Get Real" - performed by the Zetta Bytes (2:19)
5. "When the Rain Falls" - performed the Zetta Bytes (4:01)
6. "If You Wanna Rock" - written by Jay Lazaroff and Erik Isaacs, performed by Lalaine (3:33)
7. "Don't Even Try It" - written by Andrew Lane and Douglas Shawe, performed by Jai-Da (3:46)
8. "Tru Blu" - Performed by Lil' J featuring Chase (2:25)

The following music from Pixel Perfect does not appear on the soundtrack album:

- "Polka Dots" - written by R. Durrant, N. Pynn and S. Holland
- "Long Boards, Short Summer" - written by William Pearson, performed by William Pearson
- "Driving with the Top Down" - written by William Pearson, performed by William Pearson
- "Arabian Romance" - written by Crispin Merrell
- "And Then One Day" - performed by Vitamin A
