= Everwild (novel) =

Book by Neal Shusterman

- First edition
- Author: Neal Shusterman
- Language: English
- Series: Skinjacker Trilogy
- Genre: Science Fiction
- Published: 2009 Simon & Schuster
- Media type: Print (hardback & e-book)
- Pages: 432
- ISBN: 1-84738-732-2
- Preceded by: Everlost
- Followed by: Everfound

Everwild is a 2009 fantasy novel by American young adult author Neal Shusterman. The book is the second book in the Skinjacker Trilogy, which takes place in Everlost, a limbo-like place between life and death.

== Setting ==
Everlost is a place between life and death where some children end up after getting lost in their journey to the afterlife. These lost children, or Afterlights, are unseen by the living world. The Afterlights cannot interact with the real world (except those with the ability to possess, or "skinjack," the living) and will sink to the Earth's core if they stay still on living ground. An exception is a "deadspot", a place where someone has died, where the Afterlights don't sink. There are no adults in Everlost, as it is almost impossible for them to be lost on the path to the afterlife.

== Plot ==
Everwild continues the stories of Allie and Nick as they pursue separate goals. Allie sets off with Mikey, who was once the terrifying monster, McGill, in the book Everlost, to find her parents in hopes that she might put her spirit to rest; meanwhile, Nick finds himself in a race against time to save the Afterlights from endless entrapment in Everlost by the Sky Witch, Mary Hightower. Traveling in the memory of the Hindenburg, Mary spreads her propaganda and attracts Afterlights to her cause at a frightening speed.

Nick, in control of a train, is heading south to gather his own support against Mary. Due to the rumors Mary has spread about the Chocolate Ogre Nick is being overwhelmed by the memory of the chocolate stain on his face, and he is unable to stop the chocolate from spreading over his body. Nick follows the rumor of "Zack the Ripper", revealed to be Zinnia, a girl who died in the Civil War while pretending to be a boy. Zinnia has the ability to "rip," breaking the barrier between the living world and Everlost to pull or push things through. With her abilities, Nick begins to devise a plan to confront and defeat Mary.

Meanwhile, together with Mikey, Allie the Outcast travels home to look for her parents and her own life. Along the way, Allie meets three other skinjackers, led by a boy named Milos. Allie is tempted by the seductive thrill of skinjacking as she masters the skill, until she discovers the shocking truth about skinjackers: skinjackers are not necessarily dead or alive. Allie's body lies in a comatose state waiting for her soul to rejoin it, and she has the choice whether to remain a skinjacker in Everlost or return to her living body. Mikey discovers that, though he is no longer a monster, he retains the ability to morph himself into monstrous creations of his own mind. Mikey grows jealous of Milos's relationship with Allie. Allie and Mikey part ways with the skinjackers, who Mary later joins forces with.

Milos and Allie are skinjacking two teenage couples and Milos kisses Allie who later tells him no but Mikey sees and enraged at Milos and Allie leaves and turns back into a monster again. However, later on in the book he captures her and he tells her he loves her and she kisses him and he lets her go.

By the end of the book, The Ripper, Allie, and Nick join forces to defeat the evil Mary Hightower and foil her plan to kill all the world's children in order to bring them into Everlost. Nick and the Ripper arrange to meet Mary at a vortex in Graceland, and Zinnia uses her abilities to push Mary into an opening that takes her into the real world. On her way through, Mary manages to grab on to Zinnia and pull her in with her. The vortex's power causes Nick to succumb to memory and become a fully chocolate puddle. The skinjackers, now on Mary's side, blow up a bridge in the living world so that Mary's army can cross over to the unknown land west of the Mississippi River. Allie is captured and strapped to the front of the train. Mikey painstakingly shapes Nick's chocolate puddle into a golem that retains none of Nick's memories or intelligence. Determined to follow Allie, Mikey sinks into the earth with the chocolate golem so that they can cross into the west. Milos meets Mary in the real world, where she asks him to kill her so that she can return to Everlost and continue her crusade.

== Characters ==
- Alexandra "Allie the Outcast" Johnson: A fourteen-year-old girl died in the same car crash as Nick. Allie is brave and "goal" orientated though not a planner. She was reborn nine months later in "Everlost" as an Afterlight. In the first book, Everlost, Allie discovers that she has the gifted ability to "possess or "skinjack"" people. This book continues her quest to travel back home to meet her parents in order to put her troubled mind at ease. Allie discovers she is not really dead and her body lies in a hospital comatose.
- Nicholas "Nick": A fourteen-year-old half-Japanese boy. He in the same car crash as Allie on the way to a wedding when he died with chocolate on his face; now he is stuck in formal clothes and a chocolate covered mouth for eternity. In Everwild, his chocolate smudge has spread and almost half his body is covered in chocolate, thus going by his other name: The Chocolate Ogre, as Mary called him. He travels across the Everwilds on Charlie's ghost train in search of other Afterlights to help him fight Mary. Despite defending their different beliefs on Everlost, Nick still loves Mary and hopes that one day they can see eye-to-eye with each other.
- Megan "Mary Hightower" McGill: The self-proclaimed expert on Everlost. She has written many books on living in the world between life and death. She also thinks of herself as the mother of the many children stuck in this world, being one of the oldest inhabitants at fifteen. She died in a green school dress which adds to her motherly appeal. She will do anything to keep the "lost" Afterlights in Everlost. Mary has a lunatic plan of destroying the world and bringing the children into Everlost to "save" them. Despite Mary's new love of Milos later in the book, she still loves Nick deep inside.
- Mikey McGill: The brother of Megan McGill, he is fourteen years old, and is trying to redeem himself after spending nearly 30 years "kidnapping" afterlights after believing a prophecy in a chinese fortune cookie that in exchange for 1000 souls, he can return to the land of the living. He tries his best to keep from returning to the old ways to please Allie. He accompanies Allie in her request to return to her home to meet her parents one last time. Mikey has the ability to change his form into anything he wishes. Mikey may come off as selfish and proud, but he secretly loves Allie with all his heart. When he shows the emotion of love, his afterglow turns a faint lavender color, as do all Afterlights when feeling this emotion.
- Milos: A highly skilled Russian skinjacker the age of seventeen that Allie and Mikey team up with in their travels to Memphis, Tennessee. Milos is a tall and handsome Afterlight that shows himself as a gentlemen. During the time he traveled with Allie and Mikey, he taught Allie how to improve her skinjacking, and eventually making her an expert on "soul surfing"- a quick way to travel from fleshie to fleshie in a way like sling-shotting yourself. He also taught her "justicing" and "terminizing". Mikey sees Milos as someone who cannot be trusted, and decides early-on that he despises him. During his travels with Allie and Mikey, Milos tells them about how he was looking for another skinjacker named Jackin' Jill (play on "Jack and Jill"). Milos's weakness is that he falls in love too easily. He also has a bad habit of saying English phrases the wrong way.
- Isaiah: Lead afterlight in Atlanta, Georgia. He may have been a slave. Because of this, he hates/is scared of Zin.
- Pugsy Capone: Lead afterlight in Chicago. He and Mary make a deal to team up in leadership, which Mary uses to eventually betray him.
- Jill: A skinjacker who works for Pugsy Capone. Also known as Jackin' Jill. She has messy and tangled blond hair with nettles in it. Jill is a tough Afterlight that does whatever she wants most of the time, but serves Pugsy well. She is described by Mary as "being like a cat" in which she seemed to not have to follow all of Pugsy's rules. She was once in love with Milos, but left him and his friends in a mob's hands.
- Moose: A skinjacker who is permanently in football gear. His speech is impeded due to the mouthguard he is wearing. He travels with Milos. Along with Squirrel, their names are a reference to Rocky and Bullwinkle.
- Squirrel: A skinjacker who goes by his name by acting squirrely. He often repeats words more than once. He is the second traveler with Milos, along with Moose. Along with Moose, their names are a reference to Rocky and Bullwinkle.
- Charlie: A nine-year-old conductor of the ghost train Nick uses to travel. Nick pays him his chocolate to drive him across the Everwilds.
- Zinnia "Zach The Ripper" Kitner: She is a former confederate soldier. the age of fourteen. Zin has the power to "ecto-rip", or take objects from the living world. She later learns the reverse, putting things from Everlost into the living world. Zin acts very tomboyish and constantly fights with Johnnie-O. She has an Afterlight dog named Kudzu that was her only companion.
- Johnnie-O: A tough, young boy who accompanies Nick (the Chocolate Ogre) on his travels through the Everwilds. He has hands that are much too large on him and almost always puts them into fists. Even though he tells Nick that he doesn't need him, Nick knows Johnnie-O is a good friend.
