= Thunderhead (Shusterman novel) =

2018 novel by Neal Shusterman

- Author: Neal Shusterman
- Cover artist: Kevin Tong
- Language: English
- Series: Arc of a Scythe
- Genre: Science fiction; Biopunk; Adventure; Dystopia; Dystopian fiction
- Published: 2018
- Publisher: Simon & Schuster
- Publication place: United States
- Pages: 512
- ISBN: 9781442472471
- Preceded by: Scythe
- Followed by: The Toll

Thunderhead is a 2018 young-adult novel by Neal Shusterman and is the second in the Arc of a Scythe series, following Scythe.

== Plot summary ==
After the events of the previous book, Rowan Damich has taken on the job of killing and burning scythes that he feels are a disgrace to the scythedom. Citra gleans people by letting them wrap up their lives, then allowing them to choose how to die, a choice which earns her respect in the scythedom. Greyson Tolliver, a new protagonist, starts working for the Thunderhead, who sends him on a mission to save Citra from explosives. After saving her, Greyson becomes an unsavory, and finds a member of the plot to kill Citra. The group tries again to kill Citra at one of her gleanings, but they fail.

At the next concave of scythes, it is announced that the high blade of the scythedom is going to accept a higher role on an island called Endura, and that Robert Goddard is alive. Goddard then runs against Marie Curie for high blade, but is accused of malfeasance by Citra. They are taken to Endura so that the scythes there can determine what should be done. Goddard loses the inquest unanimously, then sinks the entire island in an attempt to kill everyone. In order to ensure that they will ultimately survive the sinking, Rowan and Citra are locked in a box by Marie Curie, who then kills herself.

In response to the sinking of Endura, the Thunderhead "screams" by emitting a high pitched wailing sound from every audio source on Earth, which the Tonists interpret as a prophetic event called the Great Resonance. Everyone on Earth is then deemed unsavory by the Thunderhead except for Greyson, who becomes the only one able to communicate with it.

== Reception ==
Thunderhead has received the following accolades:

- Cooperative Childrens Book Council Choices
- Bank Street Best Children's Book of the Year Selection Title
- American Library Association/Young Adult Library Services Association Teens' Top Ten List
- Wisconsin State Reading Association's Reading List
