= Eric Elfman =

American writer

Eric Elfman is an American author with a specializing in science fiction, fantasy, UFOs, and paranormal events. He has written over 14 books for young adults and middle-grade readers, including the Accelerati Trilogy, which was co-written with Neal Shusterman, Almanac of Alien Encounters (Random House, 2001), Almanac of the Gross, Disgusting, and Totally Repulsive (Random House, 1994, an ALA Recommended Book for Reluctant Readers), and Very Scary Almanac (Random House, 1993).

Elfman has been on the faculty of the Big Sur Children's Writers Workshop, sponsored by the Henry Miller Memorial Library and directed by Andrea Brown. He has also presented writing advice at the Ventana Sierra Advanced Writing Workshop in Carson City, Nevada, directed by author Ellen Hopkins.

As a private writing coach, Elfman has worked with the New York Times bestselling author Veronica Rossi (Under the Never Sky), the award-winning author Meg Medina (Yaqui Delgado), Barry Wolverton (Neversink), Stacey Lee (Under a Painted Sky, 2015), and various other storytellers.

As a screenwriter, Elfman has also written for DreamWorks, Universal Studios, Walden Media, and Disney.

== Bibliography ==
- Series
  - Accelerati Trilogy (with Neal Shusterman)
    - Tesla's Attic (2014) ISBN 978-0606358958
    - Edison's Alley (2015) ISBN 978-1423148067
    - Hawking's Hallway (2016) ISBN 978-1423155218
  - The N.O.A.H. Files trilogy (with Neal Shusterman)
    - I Am the Walrus
    - Shock the Monkey
- Novels
  - Noah's Ark (1999) ISBN 978-0787119508
- Collections
  - Three-minute Thrillers (1994) ISBN 978-1565651388
  - More Three-minute Thrillers (1995) ISBN 978-0679858058
  - Super Three-minute Thrillers (1996) ISBN 978-0760703953
- Series contributed to
  - Our town: a novelization (X Files) (1997) ISBN 978-0064471756
- Non fiction
  - The Very Scary Almanac (1993) ISBN 978-0679844013
  - Almanac of the Gross, Disgusting & Totally Repulsive (1994) ISBN 978-0679858058
  - Almanac of Alien Encounters (2001) ISBN 978-0679872887
  - Beyond Genius: The 12 Essential Traits of Today's Renaissance Men (with Scott Griffiths; 2012) ISBN 978-1481702942
