= Full Tilt (novel) =

Book by Neal Shusterman

- First edition
- Author: Neal Shusterman
- Language: English
- Genre: Adventure novel, young adult fiction
- Publisher: Simon & Schuster
- Publication date: September 1, 2004
- Publication place: United States
- Media type: Print (Paperback), (Hardcover)
- Pages: 201 pages
- ISBN: 978-0-689-80374-1
- OCLC: 50630474
- LC Class: PZ7.S55987 Fu 2003

Full Tilt is a young adult novel by Neal Shusterman, published in September 2004 by Simon & Schuster Children's Publishing. Described as a "psychological thriller" and a "fast paced horror thriller", Full Tilt has won numerous awards, including many state book awards.

== Plot ==
Brothers Blake and Quinn are with friends Russ and Maggie at an amusement park. 13-year-old Quinn is a bit more daring and adventurous than his 16-year-old brother, which leads him to wear obscene hats and want to ride the most high-octane roller coasters such as the Kamikaze. Later on in the evening, Blake ends up talking to a girl named Cassandra at a game stand who convinces him to play a game of ball toss. Having won, he receives a ticket from Cassandra to another amusement park that's invite-only and open through the night. Cassandra mysteriously vanishes from the park shortly after, and a bearded bald man is now there instead, who has no idea about anyone named Cassandra. As Blake and Quinn return home, their mother surprises them by announcing her engagement to her boyfriend. Blake accepts his soon to be stepfather but Quinn angrily storms off.

That night, Quinn mysteriously falls into a coma-like state. Looking at Quinn, Blake swears he can see carnival lights in Quinn's eyes. He also discovers the ticket given to him by Cassandra missing. Blake drives back to the park with Maggie and Russ and find a hidden path along the way. They arrive at the ravine and discover that Blake's hunch was right, when they discover a hidden amusement park. Despite not having an invitation anymore, they are let in.

As he goes on the rides, he discovers that they are anything but the ordinary rides found at theme parks. Rides start simple, but turn into lifelike experiences with a very real chance of dying. For example, a ride based on Kamikaze fighters places the rider into real planes that really do crash, killing the rider unless he or she finds a way out of the cockpit. To Blake's horror, he discovers that if you "die" on a ride, you are absorbed into it. Having been separated from his friends, Blake runs into Cassandra and confronts her about why she invited him to the park. Instead of answering the question, Blake is put into his next ride: bumper cars where riders are encouraged to hit other riders into lethal traps.

Here, he finds his brother Quinn and attempts to warn him of the dangers of the park. Quinn, enjoying the life-or-death thrill of the ride, refuses to believe Blake. As a result, Quinn runs away from Blake after finishing the ride. Blake's third ride has him meet an affable bartender during a rest stop, who warns Blake that he and his friends must ride seven rides by dawn in order to be let out. Failure to do so means they will be trapped at the park forever.

Blake meets Maggie in the fourth ride, a mirror maze where anyone who glances into the mirrors are presented with their worst fears and doubts, like being too fat or ugly. The two work together to find the exit. But just as the two come to the end of the ride, Maggie gets separated from Blake. She runs back into the ride, presumably lost.

Next, Blake runs into Russ partway through the fifth ride. To his dismay, Russ attacks Blake after Russ made a deal with Cassandra to be let out of the park. Russ fails to prevent Blake from advancing to another ride and Cassandra betrays Russ by sending him to The Works, a desolate place similar to early industrial revolution factories that holds the park together. It is filled with individuals trapped by the park working nonstop to maintain the rides under threat of oblivion. Blake manages to locate Quinn again after his encounter with Russ. This time, he successfully persuades Quinn to escape with him after the fifth ride.

As the brothers head towards the sixth ride, the trapped guests in the park begin to cheer. No one had ever gone this far since the park opened and those trapped support Blake on his quest to escape. His next ride is called King Tut, but because "King Tut" is never supposed to live, the ride starts to collapse on the duo. As a result, Blake falls into the Works where he sees Maggie and Russ. Cassandra, desperate to keep Blake from leaving, makes Blake an offer. She offers Blake the chance to become someone akin to a god in the park. Blake would have powers equal to hers and be able to change reality in the park to his liking, making it a better place for his friends- as long as Blake stops advancing on his sixth ride. He rejects the offer however and joins Quinn on his journey to the final ride.

Blake and Quinn survive the last ride, but are told by Cassandra that the last ride was only Quinn's fifth and time is up. All around them, the park seems to fall apart. Blake's actions surviving the seven rides have destabilized the alternate reality that Cassandra and the park reside in. Cassandra then makes one final offer to Blake. If Blake survives riding one additional ride, Cassandra will release him, Quinn, Russ, Maggie. However, if he loses, he and his friends will stay there forever.

The Tea Cups ride takes Blake back in time to his worst childhood memory, a school bus accident from when he was 7-years-old, which only he survived. In the end Blake remembers how he had escaped through the back door, and beats the ride through accepting that he has been scared of living life ever since. Blake, Quinn, Russ, and Maggie are then brought back to reality to find out that they had fallen unconscious and had been in a car crash on their way to the park. Quinn also ends up in the hospital. They find nothing where the park used to be, and none of them are sure if the events that night truly happened or not.
