= The Pigeon Egg Strategy =

1998 Hong Kong film by Max Makowski

- Directed by: Max Makowski
- Release date: 1998
- Running time: 84 minutes
- Country: Hong Kong
- Language: English

The Pigeon Egg Strategy is a 1998 Hong Kong black-and-white film directed by Max Makowski. One of the most notable aspects of the film is its multi-cultural nature. Makowski is a Brazilian who speaks Spanish and he shot the film with an American cast in Hong Kong with a crew of Chinese pornographers. The script was written in Germany. It was made for US$125,000 and recouped its investment through self-distribution to small independent cinemas. Completed in 1997, the 84-minute absurdist comedy about a strange chain of events that take place amongst a group of identically attired assassins, posing as German ham delivery men in Hong Kong was shot in less than 15 days. It appeared in the frontier section of the Sundance Film Festival and South by Southwest, and has not received any sort of major distribution, leaving its cult following to a limited number of viewers. There are many jokes about the nature of language and it is filled with puns and non sequitur. The tagline on the poster reads:

"It's all fun and games until someone loses an eye (or a 'u')."
