= Rick Nicita =

Entertainment executive and producer

- Born: Charles Richard Nicita; December 15, 1945 (age 80); Mount Vernon, New York
- Occupations: Talent agent; producer former Creative Artists Agency co-chairman and managing partner
- Years active: 1968–Present
- Spouses: Wallis Nicita (div. 1983) Paula Wagner (m. 1984)
- Children: Jesse (b. 1979), Zachary (b. 1987)

Rick Nicita (born Charles Richard Nicita; December 15, 1945) is an American entertainment executive, talent agent, and motion picture/TV producer. Nicita is a former co-chairman and managing partner of Creative Artists Agency.

== Career ==
=== William Morris Agency ===
Before turning exclusively to production and consultation in 2017, Rick Nicita spent five decades as a professional talent agent and manager starting in May 1968 with the William Morris Agency (WMA) New York City, and later transferring to WMA's Beverly Hills offices in 1976. At WMA, Nicita started in the mailroom and earned his full agenting position over time, a traditional rite of initiation.

In a 2003 interview, Rick Nicita detailed his early days with William Morris: "I had dropped out of Fordham Law School when I realized that very little of the study and practice of law interested me. I spent many weeks trying to figure out what I wanted to do--- not what I should do, or what was easiest, or what society wanted me to do, but what I wanted to do. I always loved movies so I decided that I would be in the movie business. I called a fraternity brother who was temporarily working at William Morris and asked him to help me get a job there. I didn't even know what an agent did. I loved it the minute I started."

=== Creative Artists Agency (CAA) ===
Rick Nicita left the William Morris Agency in 1980 to join the then four year-old Creative Artists Agency, after being hand-selected by CAA's leadership of the time, which included founders Michael Ovitz and Ronald Meyer. Nicita was later named co-chairman of CAA and then managing partner, all of this within the historical era in which CAA was considered the world's dominant talent agency.

During his time with CAA, Rick Nicita maintained a client list that included Francis Ford Coppola, Al Pacino, Rob Reiner, Bette Midler, Mick Jagger, David Lynch, Christopher Walken, Debra Winger, Tom Cruise, Anthony Hopkins,Nicole Kidman, Kurt Russell, and Sally Field.

=== Morgan Creek and RPMedia ===
Rick Nicita left Creative Artists Agency in 2008 to become Morgan Creek's Co-chairman and COO. Nicita departed Morgan Creek in 2011, later returning to talent representation via his self-created RPMedia shingle. (RP is an acronym for "Rick and Paula").

== Personal life ==
Rick Nicita is the son of Frances (née Scapolito) and Charles Nicita. Nicita was born in Mount Vernon, New York. He and his family moved to Larchmont, New York, in 1952, where he graduated from Mamaroneck High School, class of '63. Nicita later attended Wesleyan University, graduating in the class of '67.

In 1969, Rick Nicita married casting director/producer Wallis Nicita (née Lindburg). They divorced in 1983. They have a son, Jesse, born in 1979.

In 1984, Nicita married fellow CAA talent agent, Paula Wagner. Wagner later moved into producing when she and former client, Tom Cruise, formed Cruise/Wagner Productions. For many years, Rick Nicita and Paula Wagner were cited in the international media as "Hollywood's Power Couple". Nicita and Wagner remain married. They have a son, Zachary, born 1987.

== Bibliography ==
- Ovitz, Michael (2018). Who Is Michael Ovitz?: A Memoir. Portfolio/Penguin. ISBN 978-1-591-84554-6.
