= Dorian (name) =

Dorian (/ˈdɔːriən/) is a given name of Greek origin. In Greek, the meaning of the name Dorian is of Doris, a district of Ancient Greece, or of Dorus, a legendary Greek hero. Dorus was a son of Hellen, the eponymous progenitor of the Hellenes. Dorus is thought to be the founder of the Dorian tribe. The Dorians were an ancient Hellenic tribe that is supposed to have existed in the north-eastern regions of Greece, ancient Macedonia and Epirus. Another possible origin is the Greek Dorios, meaning "child of the sea".

Notable people with the name "Dorian" include:

== First name ==
- Dorian Abbot, American geophysicist
- Dorian Aldegheri (born 1993), French rugby union footballer
- Dorian Allworthy, American painter
- Dorian Andronic (born 1989), Romanian footballer
- Dorian Auguiste (born 1980), Dominican-Virgin Island cricketer
- Dorian Babunski (born 1996), Macedonian footballer
- Dorian Bailey (born 1997), American soccer player
- Dorian Baxter (born 1950), Canadian politician
- Dorian Bertrand (born 1993), French footballer
- Dorian Boccolacci (born 1998), French racing driver
- Dorian Boguță (born 1971), Moldovan-Romanian actor
- Dorian Boose (1974–2016), American football player
- Dorian Brew (born 1974), American football player
- Dorian Bylykbashi (born 1980), Albanian footballer
- Dorian Caddy (born 1995), French footballer
- Dorian Çollaku (born 1977), Albanian hammer thrower
- Dorian Concept (born 1984), Austrian composer
- Dorian Coninx (born 1994), French triathlete
- Dorian Cooke (1916–2005), English intelligence officer
- Dorian Corey (1937–1993), American drag performer
- Dorian Daughtry (born 1967), American baseball player
- Dorian Derbaci (born 2006), Swiss footballer
- Dorian Dervite (born 1988), French footballer
- Dorian Descloix (born 1988), French tennis coach
- Dorian Dessoleil (born 1992), Belgian footballer
- Dorian Diring (born 1992), French footballer
- Dorian Electra (born 1992), American singer-songwriter
- Dorian Etheridge (born 1998), American football player
- Dorian Feigenbaum, Austrian psychoanalyst
- Dorian Finney-Smith (born 1993), American basketball player
- Dorian FitzGerald (born 1975), Canadian artist
- Dorian Foulon (born 1998), French cyclist
- Dorian Fuller, American archaeologist
- Dorian Godon (born 1996), French cyclist
- Dorian M. Goldfeld (born 1947), American mathematician
- Dorian Gray (disambiguation)
- Dorian Gregory (born 1971), American actor
- Dorian Haarhoff (born 1944), Namibian writer
- Dorian Hanza (born 2001), Equatoguinean footballer
- Dorian Harewood (born 1950), American actor
- Dorian Harper (born 1982), Montserratian footballer
- Dorian Hauterville (born 1990), French bobsledder
- Dorian Healy (born 1962), British actor
- Dorian Holley (born 1956), American musician
- Dorian James (born 1981), South African badminton player
- Dorian Johnson (born 1994), American football player
- Dorian Jones (born 1992), Welsh rugby union footballer
- Dorian Keletela (born 1999), Congolese sprinter
- Dorian Kërçiku (born 1993), Albanian footballer
- Dorian Le Gallienne (1915–1963), Australian composer
- Dorian Leigh (1917–2008), American model
- Dorian Leljak, Serbian pianist
- Dorian Lévêque (born 1989), French footballer
- Dorian Lopinto (born 1957), American actress
- Dorian Lough (born 1966), English actor
- Dorian Malovic, French journalist
- Dorian Marin (born 1960), Romanian football coach
- Dorian Mausi (born 2002), American football player
- Dorian McMenemy (born 1996), Dominican swimmer
- Dorian Missick (born 1976), American actor
- Dorian Mortelette (born 1983), French rower
- Dorian N'Goma (born 1988), Congolese footballer
- Dorian O'Daniel (born 1994), American football player
- Dorian Parker (1923/1924–2007), American politician
- Dorian "Doc" Paskowitz (1921–2014), American surfer
- Dorian Peña (born 1977), Filipino-American basketball player
- Dorian Răilean (born 1993), Moldovan footballer
- Dorian Rogozenco (born 1973), Romanian chess grandmaster
- Dorian Rottenberg (1925–?), Russian translator
- Dorian Rudnytsky (born 1944), American cellist
- Dorian Scott (born 1982), Jamaican shot putter
- Dorian Shainin (1914–2000), American management consultant
- Dorian Singer (born 2002), American football player
- Dorian Smith (born 1985), American football player
- Dorian Ștefan (born 1959), Romanian footballer
- Dorian Strong (born 2002), American football player
- Dorian Thompson-Robinson (born 1999), American football player
- Dorian Ulrey (born 1987), American runner
- Dorian van Rijsselberghe (born 1988), Dutch windsurfer
- Dorian Weber (born 1982), American rower
- Dorian West (born 1967), British rugby union footballer
- Dorian Williams (1914–1985), British equestrian
- Dorian Williams (American football) (born 2001), American football player
- Dorian Wilson (born 1964), American conductor
- Dorian Wood (born 1975), American musician
- Dorian Yates (born 1962), British bodybuilder
- Dorian Zachai, American fiber artist

== Surname ==
- Armand Dorian (born 1973), American physician
- Armen Dorian (1892–1915), Armenian poet
- Charles Dorian (1891–1942), American actor
- Emil Dorian (1893–1956), Romanian writer
- Nancy Dorian (1936–2024), American linguist
- Paul Dorian, Canadian physician
- Pierre Frédéric Dorian (1814–1873), French blacksmith
- Shane Dorian (born 1972), American surfer
- Steven Dorian (born 1977), American singer

== Fictional characters ==
- Dorian Gray (character), the protagonist of the novel The Picture of Dorian Gray by Oscar Wilde
- Dorian Red Gloria, Earl of Gloria from the manga series From Eroica with Love
- Dorian Lord, on the American soap opera One Life to Live
- Dorian Pavus, in the video game Dragon Age: Inquisition
- Arno Dorian, in the video game series Assassin's Creed
- John Dorian, in the TV series Scrubs

== Other uses ==
- Dorian (disambiguation)
- Dorrian (disambiguation)
- Hurricane Dorian, a Category 5 Atlantic hurricane (2019)

== See also ==
- Dora (given name)
- Dorien (given name)
