= James M. Adovasio =

American archaeologist (1944–2026)

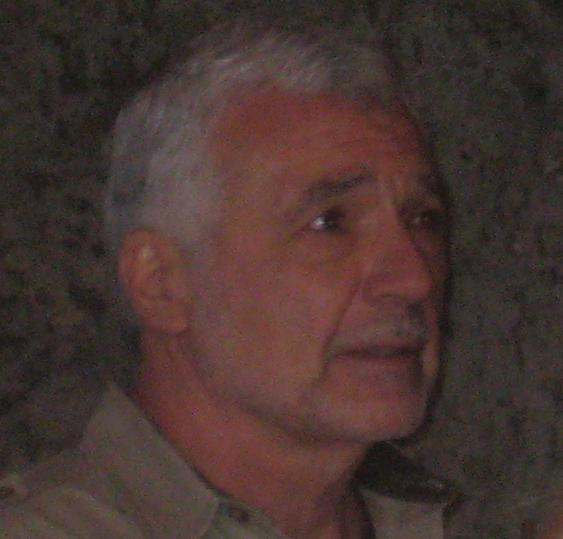
- James M. Adovasio
- Born: February 17, 1944; Youngstown, Ohio, U.S.
- Died: October 4, 2026 (aged 82); North East, Pennsylvania, U.S.
- Education: University of Arizona (B.A., 1965); University of Utah (Ph.D., 1970)
- Known for: Meadowcroft Rockshelter
- Scientific career
- Fields: Archaeology
- Workplaces: University of Pittsburgh; Mercyhurst University
- Doctoral advisor: Jesse D. Jennings

James Michael Adovasio (February 17, 1944 – October 4, 2026) was an American archaeologist and one of the foremost experts in perishable artifacts (such as basketry and textiles). He was the Provost, Dean of the Zurn School of Natural Sciences and Mathematics, and Director of the Mercyhurst Archaeological Institute at Mercyhurst University in Erie, Pennsylvania, Adovasio is best known for his work at Meadowcroft Rockshelter in Pennsylvania and for his subsequent role in the "Clovis First" debate. He published nearly 400 books, monographs, articles, and papers in his field.

== Background ==
Adovasio was born in Youngstown, Ohio, on February 17, 1944. He received his B.A. in anthropology from the University of Arizona in 1965. He spent a year in the University of Arizona's graduate program in anthropology before pursuing his Ph.D., which he received in 1970 from the University of Utah. During his graduate studies, Adovasio worked on multiple excavations and ecological and archaeological mapping projects in Utah; he also performed basketry and textile analyses for Danger Cave and Hogup Cave.

By his own admission, Adovasio was "programmed to be an archaeologist." He developed a passion for archaeology at a young age. Under the guidance of his mother, a historian, he learned to read using books about geology, paleontology, and archaeology.

At the University of Utah, Adovasio studied under the tutelage of Jesse D. Jennings, whose work at Danger Cave and other eastern Great basin closed sites greatly influenced Adovasio's research foci. During Adovasio's graduate years at the University of Utah, he processed a deluge of perishable artifacts (baskets, strings, and cords) from Hogup Cave. Through this work, Adovasio developed expertise in and passion for perishable artifacts that has persisted throughout his career.

In an interview about his book The First Americans, Adovasio comments on his role as an archaeologist in the modern age: "I think in a sense the story that we’re trying to tell…is how we ended up where we are now technologically, socially, and environmentally because—you’ve heard the old saw ‘You can’t know where you’re going in the future unless you know where you’ve been in the past?’ Well, it really is true, and now we understand better how to figure out where we were."

== Career ==
Adovasio latterly worked at Mercyhurst University, where he was a professor of Anthropology, Archaeology, and Geology, Director of the Anthropology and Archaeology and Geology Departments, Director of the Mercyhurst Archaeological Institute (MAI), Dean of the Zurn School of Natural Sciences and Mathematics, Senior Counselor to the President, and Provost. From 1995 to 2001, he served as Commissioner of the Pennsylvania Historical and Museum Commission. He served as an expert witness for Archaeological Resource Protection Act (ARPA) cases, helping to protect archaeological sites from looters. Before taking a position at Mercyhurst, Adovasio taught at Youngstown State University and at the University of Pittsburgh. He taught anthropology at Youngstown State from 1966 to 1968 and 1970–1971. After taking a postdoctoral stint at the Smithsonian Institution, he assumed a position at Pitt, where he worked from 1972 to 1990. While there, he taught anthropology, Latin American studies, and geology and planetary sciences; he also served as Chairman of the Department of Anthropology and Director of the Cultural Resource Management Program (CRMP). Adovasio founded the Cultural Resource Management Program at Pitt. The fundamental purpose of CRMP was to conduct basic research and to provide a vehicle to teach students how to conduct archaeology utilizing precise data collection and documentation procedures often with highly sophisticated tools. He maintained this research/teaching orientation at the Mercyhurst Archaeological Institute.

He also worked on a multitude of excavations in North America and internationally, including Meadowcroft Rockshelter, where he has been involved for the past 40 years. He has worked on excavations in Ukraine, the Czech Republic, and Israel, and analyzed perishable remains from excavations in Central and South America, Europe, and Asia.

== Meadowcroft Rockshelter ==
Adovasio excavated the Meadowcroft Rockshelter site in Pennsylvania from 1973 to 1978 under the auspices of the University of Pittsburgh. The site contains 11 distinct stratigraphic units spanning at least 16,000, and potentially 19,000 radiocarbon years, of sporadic occupation, making it the oldest and longest occupational sequence in eastern North America and one of the oldest in the Western Hemisphere. The site was visited principally during the Fall of the year by broad spectrum foragers throughout its long history. Even after the appearance of horticulture in the area, the basic function of the site never changed.

Due to the age of this site, Adovasio was involved in the "Clovis First" debate for several decades, defending Meadowcroft as a pre-Clovis site. Skeptics like James Mead and C. Vance Haynes have repeatedly questioned Meadowcroft's age based on concerns about contamination of radiocarbon samples and the absence of Pleistocene fauna.

To support the radiocarbon dates from the earliest occupational levels, Adovasio emphasized that the 52 radiocarbon dates from Meadowcroft are, with several inconsequential low order reversals in late contexts, in absolute stratigraphic order. Additionally, all of the assayed samples derive from firepits and fire features with directly associated cultural material of indisputable anthropogenic origins. The entire suite of early dates derives from beneath a rockfall event of Clovis age.

Haynes and others have raised the possibility of coal contamination, but only of the 11 oldest dates. Adovasio has repeatedly pointed out that there is no coal seam at Meadowcroft—only isolated outcrops of vitrinite—making contamination unlikely. Further, the highly localized vitrinite is separated from the Stratum IIa occupational floors by approximately 30–50 cm of undisturbed deposits. Regardless, vitrinite is not soluble in water and could therefore only contaminate fire features in the stratum as particulate matter. Repeated examination of the radiocarbon samples by four different laboratories has consistently failed to reveal any particulate fragments. Additionally, microstratigraphic analyses by Paul Goldberg and associates has conclusively indicated absolutely no groundwater movement and hence, no vehicle for transporting contaminants in any of the sites 11 strata. Furthermore, if vitrinite contaminated the dates in Stratum IIa, it logically follows that it would have similarly contaminated all subsequent dates as the same vitrinite exposures were present throughout the Meadowcroft occupation. If the later dates were contaminated to the same extent claimed for the earlier dates, the later dates would be several thousand years in the future. Haynes also suggests that soluble matter may have contaminated the carbonized cut bark specimen from lower Stratum IIa, as is the case with the charcoal samples derived from fire features. There is absolutely no evidence for soluble or non-soluble contamination of the cut bark specimen.

The faunal remains at Meadowcroft have also been a point of contention; namely, that no Pleistocene fauna has been identified in the stratum dated to the Pleistocene. However, preservation of bone is poor in the deepest levels and only 11.9 grams of identifiable faunal remains have been recovered. Significantly, all of the identifiable remains represent species which have previously been recovered in Pleistocene contexts, though none of them are extinct. The pre-Clovis debate continues, with many skeptics resurrecting the same concerns about contamination and absence of Pleistocene fauna. It is notable, however, that although archaeologists have called the early dates from Meadowcroft into question, Adovasio's methods of excavation have always been considered above reproach.

== Research emphases ==
Adovasio primarily studied soft technologies/perishable artifacts (such as basketry, textiles, and cordage). As an expert in textiles and other perishables, Adovasio examined approximately 90% of all North American perishables and wrote numerous books, guides, papers, and chapters for edited volumes over the identification and analysis of perishables from various parts of the continent.

He also examined the adaptations and behaviors of Late Pleistocene and Early Holocene populations globally and was involved in developing the interdisciplinary relationship between archaeology and geology (geoarchaeology). Finally, he is also involved in the ongoing development of excavations, field documentation, and analytical protocols for excavations, as shown by his work in CRMP at Pitt and at MAI at Mercyhurst.

Adovasio worked to dispel gender bias in prehistoric archaeology. Traditionally, archaeologists have painted men in prehistoric cultures as the principal breadwinners and central figures in the economy of their respective populations. Adovasio, however, defended the importance of women to prehistoric lifeways in his book The Invisible Sex, coauthored with Olga Soffer and Jake Page. One of the primary reasons the androcentric view has persisted is the relative absence of women from the archaeological record: the durable evidence of male handiwork (lithics) endures, but softer technologies decompose. Since women were typically the ones who made and used perishable artifacts, their roles in prehistory are often undetected since these artifacts break down so quickly. Adovasio's specialty gave him a unique window into the world of prehistoric women, providing a logical platform from which to attack traditional concepts about men's and women's roles in prehistoric North America.

He worked in the Gulf of Mexico looking for submerged sites on the continental shelf, focusing on submerged coastlines, especially where rivers meet the ocean. Analysis of submerged sites could yield a wealth of information about prehistoric humans, as modern humans have yet to disturb them due to the rise in sea level that submerged the sites thousands of years ago. He continued to analyze prehistoric plant fiber perishables from throughout the world.

== Death ==
Adovasio died on October 4, 2026, at the age of 82.

== Honors and awards ==
Adovasio was the recipient of a number of honors and awards. In 1971, the Smithsonian Institution awarded him a Post-Doctoral Research Fellowship, followed by a Certificate for Academic Achievement in 1972. Adovasio received an honorary D.Sc. from Washington and Jefferson College in 1983. He also won the Mercyhurst College Alumni Association Outstanding Achievement Award (1993), the Pennsylvania Historic Preservation Board Award for Archaeological Research at Meadowcroft Rockshelter (1996), and the J. Alden Mason Award for Career Contribution to Pennsylvania Prehistory (1996). In 1995, Adovasio became a Knight of the Sovereign Military Order of Malta. His peers elected him as a fellow for the American Association for the Advancement of Science, and he served as a lecturer for the Archaeological Institute of America beginning in 2008.

== Selected books and monographs ==
- —— (2010). Basketry Technology: A Guide to Identification and Analysis (Updated ed.). Walnut Creek, CA: Left Coast Press. ISBN 978-1-59874-557-3. LCCN 2011456874. OCLC 649803847.
- ——; Soffer, Olga; Page, Jake (2007). The Invisible Sex: Uncovering the True Roles of Women in Prehistory. New York: Harper Collins. ISBN 978-0-06-117091-1. OCLC 71126923.
- ——; Page, Jake (2002). The First Americans: In Pursuit of Archaeology's Greatest Mystery. New York: Random House. ISBN 978-0-375-50552-2. OCLC 49936089.

== Selected papers ==
- Jolie, E. A.; Lynch, T. F.; Geib, P. R.; Adovasio, J. M. (2011). "Cordage, Textiles, and the Late Pleistocene Peopling of the Andes". Current Anthropology. 52 (2): 285–296. Bibcode:2011CurrA..52..285J. doi:10.1086/659336. S2CID 43570348.
- Adovasio, J. M. (2003). "Pre-Clovis sites and their implications for human occupation before the last glacial maximum". In Madsen, D. B. (ed.). Entering America: Northeast Asia and Beringia Before the Last Glacial Maximum. Salt Lake City: The University of Utah Press. pp. 139–158.
- Soffer, O.; Adovasio, J. M.; Hyland, D. C. (2000). "The 'Venus' Figurines: Textiles, Basketry, Gender, and Status in the Upper Paleolithic". Current Anthropology. 41 (4): 511–537. doi:10.1086/317381. S2CID 162026727.
- Adovasio, J. M.; Donahue, J.; Stuckenrath, R. (1992). "Never Say Never Again: Some Thoughts On Could Haves and Might Have Beens". American Antiquity. 57 (2): 327–331. doi:10.2307/280737. JSTOR 280737. S2CID 163683890.
- Adovasio, J. M.; Donahue, J.; Stuckenrath, R. (1990). "The Meadowcroft Rockshelter Radiocarbon Chronology 1975-1990". American Antiquity. 55 (2): 348–354. Bibcode:1990AmAnt..55..348A. doi:10.2307/281652. JSTOR 281652. S2CID 163541173.
- Adovasio, J. M. (1986). "Prehistoric Basketry". In d’Azevedo, Warren L. (ed.). Handbook of North American Indians. Vol. 11. pp. 194–205.
- Adovasio, J. M. (1986). "Artifacts and Ethnicity: Basketry as an Indicator of Territoriality and Population Movements in the Prehistoric Great Basin". In Condie, Carol J.; Fowler, Don D. (eds.). Anthropology of the Desert West: Essays in Honor of Jesse D. Jennings. Salt Lake City: University of Utah Press. pp. 43–89.
- Donahue, J.; Adovasio, J. M. (1985). "Teaching Geoarchaeology". Anthropology & Education Quarterly. 16 (4): 306–310. doi:10.1525/aeq.1985.16.4.04x0405o.
- Adovasio, J. M; Gunn, J. D.; Donahue, J.; Stuckenrath, R.; Guilday, J. E.; Volman, K. (1980). "Yes, Virginia, It Really Is That Old: A Reply to Haynes and Mead". American Antiquity. 45 (3): 588–595. doi:10.2307/279879. JSTOR 279879. S2CID 162187078.
- Adovasio, J. M.; Gunn, J. D.; Stuckenrath, R. (1978). "The Meadowcroft Rockshelter, 1977: An Overview". American Antiquity. 43 (4): 632–651. Bibcode:1978AmAnt..43..632A. doi:10.2307/279496. JSTOR 279496. S2CID 161465402.
