= Margaret Wettlin =

American journalist

Margaret Wettlin Margarita Danielevna Vettlin
- Born: Margaret Butterworth Wettlin; 1907; Newark, New Jersey, United States
- Died: 1 September 2003 (aged 95–96); West Philadelphia, Pennsylvania, US
- Citizenship: Soviet; United States
- Education: West Philadelphia High School
- Alma mater: University of Pennsylvania
- Spouse: Andrei Efremoff (m. 1934; died 1968)
- Children: 2

Margaret Butterworth Wettlin (Russian: Маргарита Даниэлевна Веттлин, Margarita Danielevna Vettlin; 1907–2003) was an American-born Soviet memoirist and translator, best known for her translations of Russian literature. While living in Russia, she was forced into spying for its secret service.

== Early life ==
Wettlin was born in Newark, New Jersey in 1907, and raised in West Philadelphia. She grew up in a Methodist family. Her father was a pharmaceutical salesman. She had a sister, Helen, and a brother Daniel.

Wettlin attended West Philadelphia High School, where she was class president. Following high school, she joined the School of Education at the University of Pennsylvania (UPenn) in 1924 and graduated in 1928.

Wettlin's first job after university was as an English teacher at Lehighton High School. She then worked as a high-school teacher in Media, Pennsylvania till 1932.

After witnessing the collapse of the US economy in the Great Depression, and fascinated by the Soviet experiment of establishing a new economic policy, she travelled to Russia, planning to stay a year.

== Soviet period ==
Shortly after arriving in the USSR on a tourist visa, Wettlin took up a job teaching the children of American automobile workers in Gorky. To change to an employment visa, she had to leave the country temporarily. Before her departure for Helsinki, she met Andrei Efremoff, a stage director, who would become her husband in 1934. Their first child, Andrei Efremoff Jr. was born in 1935.

Efremoff was a close friend of Konstantin Stanislavski, and closely associated with the burgeoning theatre scene in the Soviet Union. The government dispatched him to various parts of the country to establish new theatres. Wettlin travelled extensively with him to Mongolia and Siberia.

In 1936, Wettlin was able to travel to the US. She held a successful lecture tour organised by her friends at UPenn. She was invited back for another tour, but later that same year, Joseph Stalin decreed that foreigners living in the USSR either had to take up Soviet citizenship or leave the country for good. Unwilling to abandon her family, Wettlin became a Soviet citizen.

Wettlin joined the teaching staff at the Maurice Thorez Moscow State Pedagogical Institute of Foreign Languages in Moscow before the Second World War.

The Soviet secret service forced her to become an informer for them. She was to keep tabs on her neighbours and friends, and report on their conversations to the agency. Efremoff never knew of her work. She grew disillusioned with it when some of her acquaintances were 'disappeared' following her reports.

When the Nazis invaded the USSR in June 1941, Wettlin became a reporter for Radio Moscow. The Nazis besieged Moscow, and Efremoff was put to work establishing entertainment units for Soviet soldiers, often close to the front. Wettlin and her family accompanied him on his duties. Thereafter they managed to escape to Nalchik, Kabardino-Balkaria in the Caucasus.

Wettlin wrote her first book, Russian Road, describing her experiences and observations on Soviet civilian life during the war. The book was translated and published in Denmark, Norway and France to some acclaim.

After the war, Wettlin began her career of translating Russian books to English. She specialised in Maxim Gorky's works. Again she was forced into spying for the secret service, a distasteful task she abandoned unilaterally when her report recommending treatment for a neighbour resulted in the woman being arrested. Despite her fears for herself and her family, Wettlin did not suffer any punishment from the authorities, but Efremoff became ostracised.

== Later life ==
Efremoff died in 1968. Wettlin published her book on Alexander Ostrovsky, a nineteenth century Russian playwright. In 1973, she visited the US for the first time in over thirty years. Her family and old friends encouraged her to consider emigrating back to America.

In 1980, Wettlin returned to the US. The State Department's decision that she had become a Soviet citizen under duress meant that her US citizenship was reinstated. Her daughter and grandson moved to Philadelphia with her, while her son remained in the USSR. He and his family joined her seven years later.

Margaret Wettlin died on 1 September 2003 in West Philadelphia.

== Works ==
=== As author ===
- Wettlin, Margaret (1945). Russian Road: Three Years of War in Russia as lived through by an American Woman. Hutchinson & Co.
- Wettlin, Margaret (1946). Sur les routes Russes: Trois ans de guerre en Russie par une Américaine (in French). Translated by Montescourt, Paule. Plon.
- Wettlin, Margaret (1992). Fifty Russian Winters: An American Woman's life in the Soviet Union. World Almanac Books. ISBN 9780886876548. (with intro. by Harrison Salisbury)

=== Translations ===
Listing based on Zubovsky Boulevard.

- Anna Karenina and Short Stories by Leo Tolstoy
- Mother, Childhood. My Apprenticeship. My Universities, The Life of Matvei Kozhemyakin, The Three, Tales of Italy and Stories and Plays by Maxim Gorky
- No Ordinary Summer by Konstantin Fedin
- Plays by Alexander Ostrovsky
- The Correspondence of Boris Pasternak & Olga Freidenberg 1910-1954
- Who Is to Blame? by Aleksandr Herzen
- The Dunno books of Nikolai Nosov
- Students by Yuri Trifonov

=== Editions ===
- Yakovlev, B. V. (editor). Lenin in Soviet poetry : a poetical chronicle. Moscow : Progress Publishers. 1st ed., 1980. 318 p. Series title: Lenin in Soviet Literature. Translated by Irina Zheleznova, Dorian Rottenberg, David Foreman, Peter Tempest, Gladys Evans, Alexei Sosinsky, Alex Miller, Robert Daglish, Margaret Wettlin, Tom Botting, and Jack Lindsay.
- Lazarev, L. (editor). Let the living remember : Soviet war poetry. Moscow : Progress Publishers. 1st ed., 1975. [400] p. Series title: Progress Soviet authors library. Translated by Alex Miller, Olga Shartse, Tom Botting, Walter May, Margaret Wettlin, Peter Tempest, Avril Pyman, Dorian Rottenberg, Gladys Evans, Irina Zheleznova, Louis Zellikoff, and Alex Miller.
- Nine modern Soviet plays. Moscow : Progress Publishers. 1st ed., 1977. 728 p. Series title: Progress Soviet authors library. Translated by Geil Vroon, Robert Daglish, Alex Miller, and Margaret Wettlin.
- Reminiscences of Lev Tolstoi by his contemporaries. Moscow : Foreign Languages Publishing House. 1960. [432] p. Translated by Margaret Wettlin.
- Bochkarev, Yuri (editor). Soviet Russian stories of the 1960s and 1970s. Moscow : Progress Publishers. 1st ed., 1977. [419] p. Translated by Alex Miller, Margaret Wettlin, Eve Manning, Arthur Shkarovsky-Raffe, and Dania Miller.
- Such a simple thing and other Soviet stories. Moscow : Foreign Languages Publishing House. [455] p. Translated by Robert Daglish, Margaret Wettlin, Helen Altschuler, S. Apresyan, Olga Shartse, and Bernard Isaacs.
- The October storm and after : stories and reminiscences. Moscow : Progress Publishers. 1st ed., 1967. 358 p. Translated by George H. Hanna, Helen Altschuler, Margaret Wettlin, and Robert Daglish.
- Imbovitz, Evgenia (editor). They found their voice : stories from Soviet nationalities with no written language before the 1917 October Revolution. Moscow : Progress Publishers. 1st ed., 1977. 255 p. Translated by Natalie Ward, Olga Shartse, Arthur Shkarovsky-Raffe, Jun Butler, Margaret Wettlin, David Sinclair-Loutit, Asaya Shoyett, Hilda Perham, Dolores Bratova, Eve Manning, David Marx, and Juli Katser.
- Aksyonov, Vasily. Colleagues. Moscow : Foreign Languages Publishing House. [317] p. Translated by Margaret Wettlin.
- Antonov, Sergei. Spring : short stories. Moscow : Foreign Languages Publishing House. 1954. [363] p. Series title: Library of selected Soviet literature. Translated by Margaret Wettlin.
- Fedin, Konstantin. No ordinary summer : a novel in two parts : part I and II. Moscow : Foreign Languages Publishing House. 1950. [527] + [730] p. Series title: Library of selected Soviet literature. Translated by Margaret Wettlin.
- Fedin, Konstantin. No ordinary summer : a novel in two parts : part I and part II. Moscow : Progress Publishers. 1st revised paperback ed., 1967. [400] + [535] p. Series title: Soviet novels series. Translated by Margaret Wettlin.
- Gorky, M. Childhood. Moscow : Foreign Languages Publishing House. 3rd ed., [396] p. Series title: Library of selected Soviet literature. Translated by Margaret Wettlin.
- Gorky, M. Childhood. Moscow : Foreign Languages Publishing House. 1950. [443] p. Series title: Library of selected Soviet literature. Translated by Margaret Wettlin.
- Gorky, M. Mother : a novel. Moscow : Foreign Languages Publishing House. 1950. [717] p. Series title: Library of selected Soviet literature. Translated by Margaret Wettlin.
- Gorky, M. Mother : a novel in two parts. Moscow : Foreign Languages Publishing House. 2nd ed., 1954. [418] p. Series title: Library of selected Soviet literature. Translated by Margaret Wettlin.
- Gorky, M. My apprenticeship. Moscow : Foreign Languages Publishing House. 3rd ed., [608] p. Series title: Library of selected Soviet literature. Translated by Margaret Wettlin.
- Gorky, M. My apprenticeship. Moscow : Progress Publishers. 5th ed., 1968. 420 p. Translated by Margaret Wettlin.
- Gorky, M. My apprenticeship : 1916. Moscow : Foreign Languages Publishing House. 1952. [683] p. Series title: Library of selected Soviet literature. Translated by Margaret Wettlin.
- Gorky, M. Selected works in two volumes : volume 1 : stories plays. Moscow : Foreign Languages Publishing House. 1948. 698 p. Translated by B. Isaacs, J. Fineberg, M. Wettlin, R. Prokofieva, and H. Kasanina.
- Gorky, M. The life of Matvei Kozhemyakin. Moscow : Foreign Languages Publishing House. [602] p. Series title: Library of Soviet literature. Translated by Margaret Wettlin.
- Gorky, M. The three. Moscow : Foreign Languages Publishing House. [471] p. Series title: Library of selected Soviet literature. Translated by Margaret Wettlin.
- Gorky, Maxim. Childhood. Moscow : Progress Publishers. 6th ed., 1973. 232 p. Series title: Progress Soviet authors library. Translated by Margaret Wettlin.
- Gorky, Maxim. Mother. Moscow : Progress Publishers. 9th ed., 1967. [449] p. Series title: Soviet Novels Series. Translated by Margaret Wettlin.
- Gorky, Maxim. Mother. Moscow : Progress Publishers. 1979. 384 p. Series title: Collected works in ten volumes : volume III. Translated by Margaret Wettlin.
- Gorky, Maxim. Mother. Moscow : Progress Publishers. 14th ed., 1980. 384 p. Series title: Progress Soviet authors library. Translated by Margaret Wettlin.
- Gorky, Maxim. My apprenticeship. My universities. Moscow : Progress Publishers. 485 p. Series title: Progress Soviet authors library. Translated by Margaret Wettlin and Hellen Altschuler.
- Gorky, Maxim. Selected stories. Moscow : Progress Publishers. 1978. [517] p. Series title: Collected works in ten volumes : volume I. Translated by Margaret Wettlin, Avril Pyman, Bernard Isaacs, and Robert Daglish.
- Gorky, Maxim. Tales of Italy. Childhood. Moscow : Progress Publishers. [430] p. Series title: Collected works in ten volumes : volume VI. Translated by Rose Prokofieva and Margaret Wettlin.
- Herzen, Alexander. Who is to blame? : a novel in two parts. Moscow : Progress Publishers. 1978. [275] p. Series title: Progress Russian classics series. Translated by Margaret Wettlin.
- Koptayeva, Antonina. Ivan Ivanovich : a novel in two parts. Moscow : Foreign Languages Publishing House. 1952. [548] p. Series title: Library of selected Soviet literature. Translated by Margaret Wettlin.
- Lavrenyov, Boris. The forty first. Moscow : Foreign Languages Publishing House. [190] p. Series title: Library of Soviet literature. Translated by Margaret Wettlin and Naomi Jochel.
- Marshak, S. Verses for children. Moscow : Foreign Languages Publishing House. [48] p. Translated by Margaret Wettlin.
- Ostrovsky, Alexander. Plays. Moscow : Progress Publishers. 1st ed., 1974. [485] p. Translated by Margaret Wettlin.
- Ostrovsky, Alexander. Plays. Moscow : Progress Publishers. 2nd ed., 1979. [485] p. Translated by Margaret Wettlin.
- Sobko, Vadim. Guarantee of peace : a novel. Moscow : Foreign Languages Publishing House. 1951. [543] p. Translated by Margaret Wettlin.
- Soloukhin, V. Honey on bread : short stories. Moscow : Progress Publishers. 1982. 374 p. Series title: Russian and Soviet story. Translated by Kathleen Cook, Margaret Wettlin, and Dudley Hagen.
- Tolstoi, Lev. Short stories. Moscow : Foreign Languages Publishing House. [415] p. Series title: Classics of Russian literature. Translated by Margaret Wettlin.
- Tolstoy, Lev. Anna Karenina. Moscow : Progress Publishers. 1978. 584 + 495 p. Series title: Progress Russian classics series. Translated by Margaret Wettlin.
- Tolstoy, Lev. Short stories. Moscow : Progress Publishers. [307] p. Translated by Margaret Wettlin and Helen Altschuler.
- Tolstoy, Lev. Short stories. Moscow : Progress Publishers. 2nd ed., 1975. 359 p. Series title: Progress Russian classics series. Translated by Helen Altschuler, Margaret Wettlin, and Kenneth Russell.
- Trifonov, Yuri. Students : a novel. Moscow : Foreign Languages Publishing House. 1953. [498] p. Series title: Library of selected Soviet literature. Translated by Ivy Litvinova and Margaret Wettlin.
- Uspenskaya, Y. Our summer : a novel. Moscow : Foreign Languages Publishing House. 1954. [363] p. Series title: Library of selected Soviet literature. Translated by Ivy Litvinova and Margaret Wettlin.
