= Doric =

Doric may refer to:

- Doric, of or relating to the Dorians of ancient Greece
  - Doric Greek, the dialects of the Dorians
- Doric order, a style of ancient Greek architecture
- Doric, a character in the 2023 movie Dungeons & Dragons: Honor Among Thieves played by Sophia Lillis
- Doric mode, a synonym of Dorian mode, in musical scales
- Doric dialect (Scotland), a dialect spoken in the northeast of Scotland
- Doric Club, a paramilitary organization which fought against the Lower Canada Rebellion
- Doric Park, a park in Liverpool, England
- Doric Organ, a 1960s Combo organ produced in Italy
- Doric String Quartet, a string quartet based in the UK
- SS Doric (1883), a British ocean liner operated by White Star Line
- SS Doric (1923), another ship operated by White Star Line

== See also ==
- Dorian (disambiguation), a synonym
