= Dorian =

Dorian may refer to:

== Ancient Greece ==
- Dorians, one of the main ethnic divisions of ancient Greeks
- Doric Greek, or Dorian, the dialect spoken by the Dorians

== Art and entertainment ==
=== Music ===
- Dorians, an Armenian rock band
- Dorian, a Spanish electronic band
- Dorian mode, various musical modes
- Dorian Recordings, a label noted for early music recordings
- Toccata and Fugue in D minor, BWV 538, or "Dorian", an organ piece by Johann Sebastian Bach
- Ukrainian Dorian scale, a musical mode
- "Dorian", a song by Demons & Wizards from Touched by the Crimson King
- "Dorian", a song by Motograter from Desolation

=== Other arts and entertainment ===
- Dorian (film), the Canadian title of the 2004 film Pact with the Devil
- Dorian, an Imitation, a 2002 novel by Will Self
- Dorian, a 1921 novel by Nephi Anderson
- Dorian, a 2022 play by Darryl Pinckney and Robert Wilson

== People and fictional characters ==
- Dorian (name), a list of people and fictional characters with the given name or surname
- Dorian (rapper), stage name of American hip-hop artist, songwriter and music producer Alton Dorian Clark (born 1984)

== Other uses ==
- Dorian Society, a homosexual club
- KH-10 Dorian, a proposed U.S. surveillance satellite
- Hurricane Dorian, an exceptionally strong Atlantic hurricane in 2019
- Tropical Storm Dorian (2013)
- Dorian, relating to the Dora asteroid family

== See also ==
- Dorian Gray (disambiguation)
- The Picture of Dorian Gray (disambiguation)
- Doric (disambiguation)
- Dorina
- Dorrian
- Dorrien
