= Olga Soffer =

American anthropologist (1942–2026)

Olga Aleksandrovna Soffer
- Born: Olga Aleksandrovna Shabunin; 9 September 1942; Belgrade, German occupied Serbia
- Died: 20 June 2026 (aged 83); Los Angeles, United States
- Education: Hunter College
- Scientific career
- Workplaces: University of Illinois Urbana-Champaign
- Thesis: Late Pleistocene settlement systems in the Dnestr basin and vicinity (1975)

Olga Aleksandrovna Soffer (née Shabunin; 9 September 1942 – 20 June 2026) was an American anthropologist. She was a department store events co-ordinator, who went on to become professor of anthropology at the University of Illinois Urbana-Champaign. Her specialist discipline was Paleolithic archaeology, with a particular interest on clothing and the role of prehistoric women. Soffer was keen to correct the idea that stone-age men went out hunting on their own, instead her analysis showed it as a more communal endeavour that included women, children and elders.

== Early years ==
Olga Soffer was born into a White Russian emigré family in Belgrade, German occupied Serbia, in 1942. She was the daughter of Alexander and Galinda (née Girs) Shabunin, who had been displaced from the Crimea after the defeat of the White Russian movement in the civil war of 1921. Soffer spent part of her childhood in a Nazi labour camp in Serbia. After the war her family were expelled from the newly communist Yugoslavia, and spent 1951 to 1955 in a camp for displaced people in Risiera di San Sabba, near Trieste, before emigrating to the United States in September 1955. She went to Thomas Jefferson High School in Brooklyn, and then got a political science degree at Hunter College in 1965.

Soffer joined the Brooklyn department store Abraham & Straus on their management trainee scheme. She stayed there twelve years in a variety of positions, but in particular as events co-ordinator for food festivals and fashion shows. One of her signings was the pre-teenage Brooke Shields.

== University career ==
Soffer earned her Ph.D. from Hunter College, a constituent college of the City University of New York, in 1975 with a thesis title of Late Pleistocene settlement systems in the Dnestr basin and vicinity. From 1978 to 1980, she was an adjunct instructor of anthropology at Hunter, then Lehman colleges, before become an instructor at the University of Wisconsin at Milwaukee in 1980. In 1985, she was appointed assistant professor at the University of Illinois at Urbana-Champaign, promoted to associate professor in 1988 and then full professor in 1992. She spent the rest of her career at Urbana-Champaign, on retirement in 2008 she became professor emerita, until her death in 2026.

== Career impact ==
Soffer worked as a field archaeologist in Mezhyrich, Ukraine; Avdeevo, Russia; Dolní Věstonice and Pavlov, both in the Czech Republic; and also France. Her study was that of upper Upper Paleolithic sites focused on clay fragments. On some digs she took her young daughter with her, who later commented that it required the distribution of the film Indiana Jones for her to be able to explain to her teenage friends what her mother did for a living.

In scholarship, her contribution was marked by her analysis of archaeological material on what prehistoric communities wore and the role of women. Along with her colleague James M. Adovasio she noted that dress styles were not confined to crude animal skins and hides, but extended to complex woven clothing, snoods, banderas, sashes and belts. There were figurines showing women with coiffured hair and hats. It was not just a wardrobe issue, this indicated that the significance of women in ice-age civilisation, in terms of the crafting of textiles, baskets and hunting nets, that extended beyond previous analysis.

Soffer examined the artefacts from a site in the modern Czech Republic, looking at the activities of the Gravettian people, from around 27,000 years ago. Soffer came to the view that textile making extended to the use of looms, since some fabrics were plain weave, where loom technology was previously believed to date back to around 5,000 to 10,000 years ago. She challenged a traditional view of ice-age men hunting in groups to kill mammoths for food, suggesting that a more sophistical lifestyle existed, and where women were heavily involved. "If the public should understand one thing about prehistory," she said, "it is that the past was peopled not only by prehistoric men, but also by prehistoric women."

== Honours and awards ==
She was a fellow of the American Association for the Advancement of Science (AAAS), elected in 2006. She was awarded an honorary doctorate by the Russian Academy of Sciences.

== Personal life and death ==
Soffer was married twice, both ended in divorce. From 1962 to 1979 she was married to Mark Soffer, a teacher, and they had one daughter, Alexandra (Sasha). From 1979 to 1991 she was married to the poet and her university colleague Dmitry Bobyshev. She retired to Los Angeles to be closer to her daughter and two grandchildren, where she died of natural causes on 20 June 2026.

== Selected works ==
- Soffer, Olga, ed. (1987). The Pleistocene Old World: Regional Perspectives. Plenum Press. ISBN 978-0-306-42438-0. OCLC 15696668.
- Soffer, Olga (1985). The Upper Paleolithic of the Central Russian Plain. Orlando, FL: Academic Press. ISBN 978-0-12-654270-7. OCLC 11468328.
- Adovasio, J. M.; Soffer, Olga; Page, Jake (2007). The Invisible Sex: Uncovering the True Roles of Women in Prehistory. Harper Collins. ISBN 978-0-06-117091-1. OCLC 71126923.

A number of other publications are listed on Soffer's university publications page.
