= Mel Finkelstein =

American photographer

Mel Finkelstein was a Pulitzer Prize nominated photographer who rode the streets of New York City as a "camera cowboy" for more than 40 years working as a newspaper and freelance photographer..

== Early life ==
Finkelstein was born in Brooklyn, New York to Ida and Louis Finkelstein.

Finkelstein was the youngest of two sons. His elder brother Perry bought him his first camera. The two brothers would cruise the streets of New York City together to catch breaking news. Mel Finkelstein shot the still photographs while Perry filmed news reel features for CBS. Mel's girlfriend at the time, later to become his wife, Janet Levande was the reporter. Together, they called themselves the Dynamic Trio.

== Career ==
While still a student at Thomas Jefferson High School in Brooklyn, he joined the former New York Journal-American as a 16-year-old freelance photographer in 1948. Finkelstein was hired by that paper as a staff photographer and worked there while it merged in 1966 into the World-Journal-Tribune. He joined the New York Daily News in 1967 after the World Journal Tribune folded.

Mel Finkelstein left the New York Daily News twenty years later to join the staff of the New York Post. He became the photo editor of the New York Post in 1988 and remained there till his death at the age of 60 in 1992.

Finkelstein covered breaking news, photographed celebrities and politicians and carried out numerous feature and special assignments. Walter Winchell and Bobby Kennedy were frequent guests in his radio car as he cruised the streets at night, often beating police to crime scenes. Finkelstein was often referred to as "Rambo" for his willingness to go in risky areas.

Jacqueline Onassis once "judo-tricked" Finkelstein in a movie theater lobby in New York after she left her seat mid-movie to go to the lounge. She then discovered the newspaper photographers, but at the time, Finkelstein said he was already leaving. "Mrs. Onassis followed me out and then going 6 feet out of her way, walked over and hit me with a 'judo trick." He was able to get a picture of her walking away.

Finkelstein once "arrested" a mugger in Brooklyn, helped capture an armed bank robber, and talked many potential suicide jumpers down to safety.

The walls of his Baldwin, Long Island home were covered with awards and trophies. These included the National Press Photographers Association "Photographer of the Year" award, the Newspaper Guild of New York's Page One Award, the Society of Silurian's Award, the New York Press Photographers Association Award and most notably his Pulitzer Prize nomination award. Many of these awards were won repeatedly over his career.

Finkelstein captured many iconic faces ranging from political notables like President John F. Kennedy to movie stars like Marilyn Monroe. He photographed sports celebrities including boxing greats Muhammad Ali and Joe Frazier, football greats Joe Namath, and tennis stars Billie Jean King and Jimmy Connors, to name a few. Mel Finkelstein also was a regular on the baseball field covering the New York Mets and the Yankees.

Finkelstein photographed musicians including the Rolling Stones, Jefferson Airplane, Blondie, and Tony Bennett. His photographs included coverage of the Woodstock Festival and the 1960s.

Finkelstein achieved his greatest prominence through his journalistic coverage of the Civil Rights Movement. His reportage is noted for documenting key events and figures during this period of American social and political transition. His candid photographs taken during the 1960s riots took the plight of the suffering into the homes and consciousness of those sheltered from the truth of the inequality of the times.

== Personal life ==
Finkelstein married Janet Levande who died a year before Finkelstein in February 1991. They had been married for 43 years. They have four daughters and eight grandchildren.
