= Hogup Cave =

- Hogup Cave (42BO36)
- U.S. National Register of Historic Places
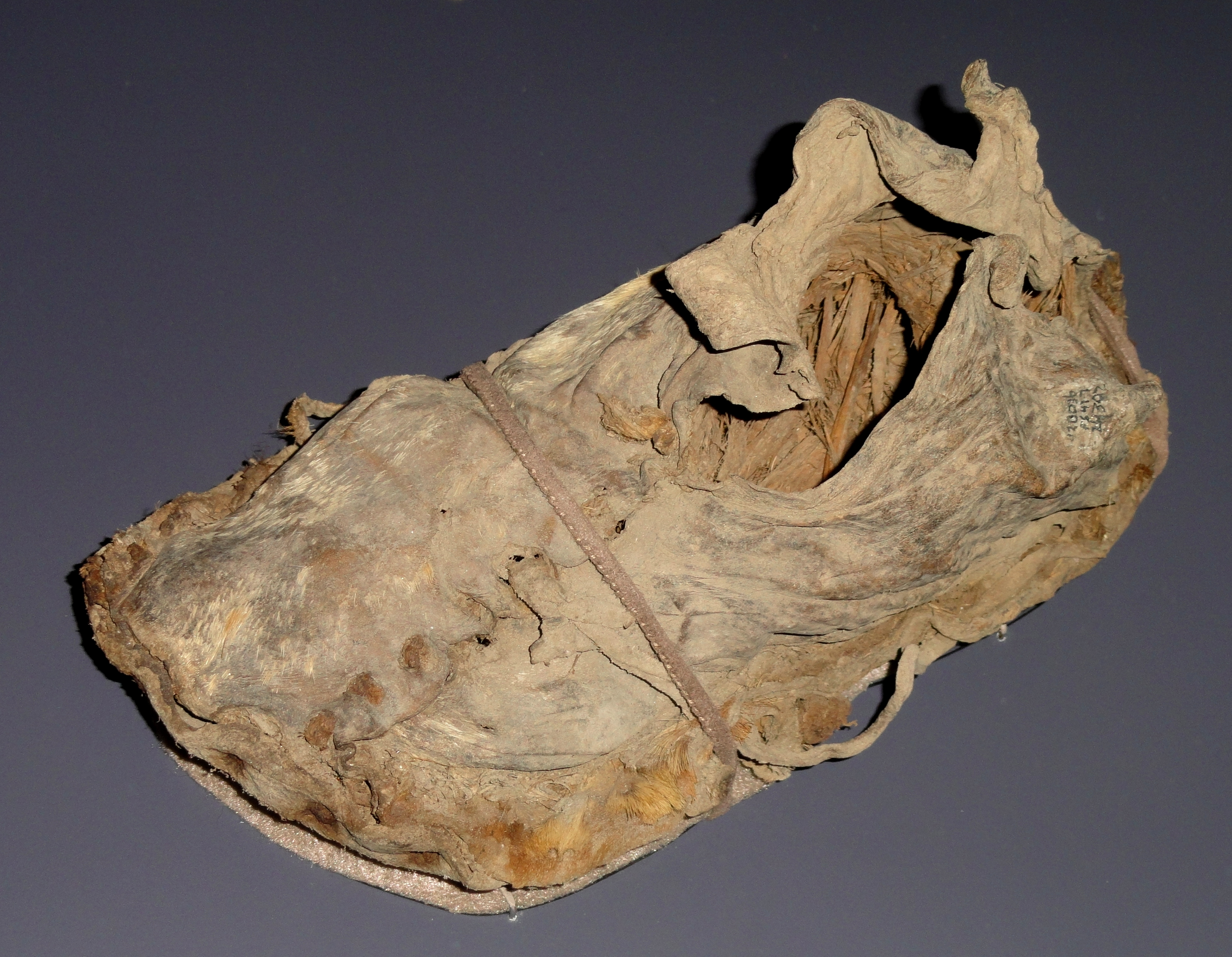
- Fremont style moccasin, circa 420 AD, found in Hogup_Cave

- Location within Utah Location within the United States
- Location: 41°22'14.6"N 113°15'22.1"W
- Nearest city: Park Valley, Utah
- Coordinates: 41°29′16″N 113°07′26″W
- Area: less than one acre
- NRHP reference No.: 86001016
- Added to NRHP: May 8, 1986

Hogup Cave is a two-chambered limestone cavern, and an important, well-studied prehistoric Great Basin site in Utah.

== Setting ==
Hogup Cave is located on the southwestern flank of Hogup Mountain in the Great Salt Lake Desert. The Great Salt Lake itself lies ten miles east of the cave. Hogup Mountain consists of three biotic zones determined by soil, altitude, and moisture. The lowest zone, known as the pickleweed-salt grass community, is a narrow band where sheep herders have excavated several wells, revealing the presence of groundwater. The presence of a deep spring suggests that this zone may have been used as a water source for the cave occupants. The dominant coverage of the entire Hogup Mountain is the sagebrush-shadscale belt which is the next zone. The top zone, the juniper zone, occurs only at the mountain's highest elevations. The highest point of Hogup Mountain is at 6847 ft. The actual location of the cave is 41°22'14.6"N 113°15'22.1"W

== Introduction ==
C. Melvin Aikens, professor emeritus at the University of Oregon, led the excavations in Hogup Cave during two field seasons: June 26 - August 15, 1967, and June 15 - August 20, 1968. According to Aikens, the main purposes of the excavations were to provide data for the study of changing patterns of cultural ecology over time, and to contribute to the solution of several problems of cultural history in the Great Salt Lake region. Over 8,000 years of accumulated deposits from repeated human occupation were found, dating from 6400 B.C. to as late as 1850 A.D when it was used by the Shoshone as a camping ground to make seasonal rounds. An archaeological monograph was published in 1970 by Aikens entitled Hogup Cave, containing a detailed analysis of nearly 10,000 artifacts recovered during the two excavations. Numerous bones, wood, hide, cordage, fibers, textile items, chipped stones, clay, pottery, coprolites, hair, feathers, and fur were analyzed.

== Stratigraphy ==
Trench excavations of the east and west walls of the cave revealed 16 major sequential stratigraphic layers. Aikens noted that the stratigraphy revealed the modifications done by the purposeful movements of the cave occupants. He also provided detailed descriptions of the individual strata.

Stratum 1
Continuous over all squares excavated and laying directly on bedrock, it ranged between 1 and 3 inches thick vertically. It had a composition of light yellow crumbly dust with rotted vegetal matter. A powdered charcoal lens of about 6 to 8 inches in diameter was found on the surface of the layer near the north end of the excavation.

Stratum 2
Only found in a small area against the east wall and in a low spot along the western boundary of excavation, it ranged between 4 and 6 inches thick. Composed of dark brown crumbly earth arising from decomposed vegetal matter, there were no cultural features found in this stratum.

Stratum 3
Continuous over all squares and ranging between 6 and 10 inches, it had a gross composition of a thoroughly burned bed of white ash containing charcoal lenses. However, the east wall and western boundary of the excavation layer were not entirely burned. There were no cultural features found in this stratum.

Stratum 4
Extended over all squares, ranging from 9 to 18 inches in thickness, and composed of pickleweed chaff, twigs, shredded bark, and antelope hair. A small bowl-shaped pit 8 inches deep and 17 inches in diameter was found near the eastern edge of the excavation, filled with ash and charcoal, suggesting it was used as a fire pit.

Stratum 5
Extended over all squares excavated and ranging between 8 and 14 inches thick. It was composed of pickleweed chaff, twigs, shredded bark, dust, and antelope hair. A large amount of human fecal matter, a charcoal-ash lens, and a 6 to 8 inch thick bed of woody twigs were found. Professor Aikens concluded that this was a special use area.

Stratum 6
Extended over all squares excavated and ranged between 6 and 13 inches thick. It had a composition of pickleweed chaff, grass, twigs, and dust. The center of the excavation contained abundant guano where bats still congregate. There were no cultural features found in this stratum.

Stratum 7
Found only over the front of the cave and ranging between 12 and 18 inches thick, it was composed of pickleweed chaff, grass, and dust. Abundant guano was found under the cleft in the cave ceiling and two small circular charcoal lenses were found near the center of the excavation.

Stratum 8
Extended over all squares excavated, ranging between 9 and 36 inches thick, it had a composition of pickleweed chaff, grass, twigs, and dust. Concentrated guano was found near the center of the excavation. A solidified burned area of charcoal and ash and two ash-charcoal lenses were also found.

Stratum 9
Extended over all squares excavated and ranged between 6 and 18 inches thick. It had a gross composition of pickleweed chaff, grass, twigs, bat guano, and dust. Guano was the dominant layer near the center of the excavation and small rock spalls were found toward the east wall.

Stratum 10
Extended over all squares excavated and ranging between 9 and 10 inches thick, and having a composition of pickleweed chaff, twigs, roof spalls, and antelope hair. A 6 to 8 inch thick deep ash zone (the result of a fire smoldering out of control) and an ash-charcoal lens were found.

Stratum 11
Continuous outside the cave portal and truncated by Stratum 12 inside the cave mouth. Composed of pickleweed chaff, grass, dust, twigs, and antelope hair, a small ash-charcoal lens was found inside the cave portal. Aikens pointed out that although this stratum was not continuous over most of the excavation, it was important because it led to the realization that there was a partial gap in the stratigraphic record.

Stratum 12
Continuous over most squares excavated and ranging between 6 and 12 inches thick, it was composed of Scirpus, bark, and antelope hair. A small ash-charcoal lens and an unlined pit of approximately 18 inches were found.

Stratum 13
Continuous over the outer chamber of the cave and ranging between 9 and 12 inches thick. It had a composition of pickleweed chaff, and there were no cultural features found in this stratum.

Stratum 14
Extended over all squares excavated in the outer room and ranging between 8 and 14 inches thick, this stratum was composed of pickleweed chaff, grass, dust, ash, and antelope hair. Bat guano was also found under the cleft in the cave ceiling. Four ash-charcoal areas were found and black stains remained from incomplete combustion. Two of the burned areas were large, with the largest separated into light grey, dark grey, black, and reddish bands. Aikens inferred that the burned area was a result of accidental in situ burning of the cave fill.

Stratum 15
Continuous over all squares excavated in the outer room and ranging between 2 and 7 inches thick. It had a composition of pickleweed chaff, dust, and guano, with no cultural features found.

Stratum 16
Continuous over all squares excavated in the outer room and ranging between 3 and 12 inches thick. It had a composition of pickleweed chaff, grass, bark, twigs, Scirpus, antelope hair, and bat guano, and three small charcoal lenses were found.

== Cultural features ==
Professor Aikens categorized four kinds of cultural features. The first were the hearths found in most levels. In some areas, there was considerable ash and charred material as a result of the in situ burning of deposits, and demonstrating that the burned areas had no distinct margins. The second type was an unlined bowl-shaped pit found in Stratum 4. This pit contained occupational detritus and no evidence of fire. The third was the thin bed of Scirpus, grasses, or twigs. Aikens suggested that this bed might have been used for sleeping or sitting, or that it was the detritus of some particular kind of activity. The fourth type of cultural feature was the modification of the cave fill and the extensive aboriginal movement, which Aikens concluded were performed to level or enlarge the living space in the cave. Professor Aikens also pointed out that cultural constructions were rare in Hogup Cave compared with the total number of deposits found, giving the impression that the occupants had made only the most rudimentary and casual modifications to the cave.

== Artifacts ==
=== Pottery ===
Professor Aikens categorized the pottery sherds found in the cave into 6 types: Great Salt Lake Grey, Knolls Grey, Snake Valley Grey, Snake Valley Corrugated, Promontory ware, and Shoshoni ware. The first pottery appeared in Stratum 12, increasing in later strata, and continued to Stratum 16. Aikens explained that the frequency distribution of the pottery suggested concurrent use of the cave by makers of both types of pottery.

=== Clay ===
Figurine fragments were represented by six unfired clay fragments. Three were conical in form and resembled the handle termini, or lower portions, of typical Utah Fremont figurines. The fourth fragment had two “ears” at the broad end, the fifth fragment was cylindrical, and the sixth fragment was L-shaped. Also found was a flattened oval shape of unfired clay containing a mixture of crushed white stones and fragments of vegetal fiber. Two flattened lumps of unfired clay with impressions of coiled basketry were found as well.

=== Chipped stone ===
Professor Aikens categorized a total of 325 complete or nearly complete projectile points that were well known in the Great Basin. He added that only the artifacts recovered from the 1967 excavation were included in his tabulation and discussion as the materials from the 1968 excavation were not yet analyzed when the paper was published.

There were 325 projectile points recovered from the cave, classified into 29 types. Besides looking at the features of the projectile points themselves, they were also compared with the collection of 489 complete projectile points from the nearby Danger Cave. After the comparison, Prof. Aikens grouped the collection into four major series: 1) Pinto or Little Lake; 2) lanceolate; 3) Elko; 4) and small projectile points. The groups signified that there was close cultural relationships between the types in the series, therefore they could be seen as four cultural/technological traditions.

There were 70 thin and bifacially worked blades, which had no cutting edges nor notches and stems. Choppers were heavier, cruder, and bifacially flaked with cutting edges. 82 coarsely flaked unifaces and bifaces were found, discarded or aborted roughouts or blanks. 147 scrapers which had one or more flaked chipped edges that created blunt working edges. Only two presented special preparation for hafting. 2 spokeshaves and 21 drills were also found. The drills looked more like artifacts than the spokeshaves, which seemed to be nondescript notches pieces of stone. The drills were found uniformly in all deposits.

=== Ground stone ===
Professor Aikens described a total of 922 items in this major category, which was broken down further into groups depending on the use of the artifacts.

"Shaft smoothers" were shaped stones which could be distinguished by abraded grooves occurring on one or more surfaces. 2 complete specimens were analyzed, both made of a pumice material, one was rectangular while the other was subrectangular with rounded edges. On the broadest edge of the second stone, there was a main groove that ran the full length of the edge. 5 specimens classified as "grooved stone" were found, one complete specimen and four fragments. The complete stone had an irregular shape of a pumice material with three shallow grooves. 8 nearly complete specimens and 262 fragments were classified as "milling stones". These specimens were further divided into two categories: block and slab milling stones. One of the two nearly complete block milling stones, made of a quartzite material, was oval in shape with a circular depression, while the other block milling stone had no depression and had a rectangular shape. The six nearly complete slab milling stones were made of mainly mica schist, schist, conglomerate, gneiss, and sandstone. Traces of red and black pigments could be found on the sides and center of two nearly complete sab milling stones respectively.

14 complete specimens and 35 fragments were classified as "manos", being further divided into 7 subclasses according to their shape, utilization, or grinding on one or more sides. They were made of sandstone, quartzite, vesicular basalt, mica schist, gabbro, granite, slate, schist, and rhyolite porphyry. Subclass 6 consisted of one long, cylindrical mano with three grinding surfaces, one of which was longitudinally and laterally convex, giving it a rocker shape. The other two surfaces were flattened, showing that they had been used for battering. 2 specimens were classification as "pestles". Made of gabbro and gneiss, they were long and tapered from broad battered ends to narrow rounded ends. One of the specimens was square and the other loaf-shaped. The loaf-shaped specimen had a surface flattened by grinding and this indicated that it was also used as a mano. Yellow pigment was found on the flat surface.

There were 6 "pounding/abrading stones" found, made of sandstone, gabbro, and conglomerate, all having flat abraded surfaces and battered edges and ends. Traces of red pigment were found on the surface of one of the specimens. 46 thin "tabular stones" were classified, which were further divided into 5 categories according to the kind and degree of modification of the stones: bifacially worked edges, unifacially worked edges, ground on two surfaces, ground on one surface, and unworked fragments. They were made of schist, shale, and limestone. There were 30 specimens classified as "incised stones", where designs had been incised on their surfaces. They were grouped according to their design elements and layout. Most of the stones were either tabular stones or pebbles with markings or designs made by incising or engraving with a sharp instrument.

=== Worked bone, antler, horn and shell ===
There were a total of 269 items in this category, broken down into four sub-categories: awls, pendants, whistles, and sheep horn wrenches. The awls were classified according to the degree of point taper and how the bone fragment was modified. They were made from antelope, sheep, or deer bones. The pendants were made from canine teeth of wapiti. They were perforated by drilling at the root end. Since there were no wapiti bones found in the cave, this suggested that the animals were killed elsewhere. A broken bone tube which had a broad, deep notch near the broken end suggested that the specimen might have been used as a whistle. 2 mountain sheep horns, perforated by a large hole, showed signs of wear on one edge of the hole, indicating the horns were used as shaft wrenches or straighteners.

=== Hide artifacts ===
There were a total of 719 items in this classification. 23 moccasins were recovered from Hogup Cave, in three categories: Hock moccasins, Fremont moccasins, and Hogup moccasins. The 3 hock moccasins recovered were made from bison hide by removing the hock of an animal through girdling the leg at two points and removing the hide in the form of a skin tube. The tubes were specially cut so that the natural L-shaped angle of the hide served as the heel of the moccasin. 16 Fremont moccasins were made of either deer or antelope skin. According to Aikens, the Fremont moccasins were first described by Morss, with the single difference between the moccasins recovered from Hogup Cave and Morss' being no seam at the heel joining the two upper pieces. The moccasins found in the cave had two flaps formed by the heel ends of the uppers that could have been folded over one another at the back of the heel and ankle and held in place by securing the ankle with a long string. 4 moccasins were classified as Hogup moccasins due to their distinct pattern. They were made from a single piece of hide that is folded over the foot and sewn together across the toe. A separate outer sole was added to the basic piece and an ankle wrap was sewn around the upper part to give the moccasin a bootlike appearance. Also recovered from the caves were 2 fur robes, both of which were rectangular in shape, one of which still had fur on the hide while the other had about 40% of the fur retained.

=== Feathers ===
There were three types of feathers recovered from the caves. 10 feathers had been worked by cutting the barbs and cropped very close to the rachis. The function of these feathers was unknown. 3 flight feathers were worked by wrapping them with thin strips of sinew. One of the specimens had one side of the barbs uncut and the other side cut off evenly. The function of these feathers was also unknown. Finally, a total of 245 unworked feathers were recovered. The good condition of the feathers allowed straightforward visual comparison with known specimens from the Royal Ontario Museum collections. Donald Baldwin described that the grey-crowned rosy finch was the smallest bird and the most heavily represented of any species.

=== Worked plant fibers ===
46 pads were made of shredded sagebrush and another 3 were made of grass stems, the fibers were stuck together and matted tightly, suggesting that they might have been impregnated with blood, further suggesting they might have been used as menstrual pads. However, it could not be established that blood was the adhesive agent, so the identification of menstrual pads remains conjectural.

=== Textiles ===
160 pieces of basketry and specimens were recovered from the 1967-68 excavations. The collections were one of the largest and best preserved from a well-dated Great Basin site. Twined and coiled basketry were identified with subclasses based on the several diagnostic criteria. 8 subclasses were allocated to twined basketry and 7 subclasses were assigned to coiled basketry. When dealing exclusively with Hogup materials, Dr. Adovasio concluded that coiling was earlier than twining in Hogup Cave and more popular. The textile production and use at Hogup Cave were more common and there was a greater variety in technique and form below Stratum 10. Subclass 13 (one-rod and bundle foundation, noninterlocking stitch) gained its popularity through time due to its adaptability.

=== Artifacts of wood ===
491 pieces of worked wood and reed were recovered. Most of the finished artifacts were related to the hunt, while the digging sticks represented the gathering aspect of the economy. A small variety of gaming pieces could infer leisure time or perhaps a nonsecular side of the culture. Fragments of atlatl darts and throwing boards represented the use of atlatl. There was no firm evidence for feathering of mainshafts of the darts, which consisted of a shallow cup in the proximal end to engage the pointed spur on the distal end. The mainshaft specimens collected were too fragmentary to estimate the length. the throwing boards were also too fragmentary to establish a good estimate of their size or form. The arrows collected were represented by a compound type with a reed mainshaft and a wooden foreshaft. Dalley concluded that the compound arrow was the most common type found in the cave. A striking change from using atlatl to bow and arrow could be seen when comparing the strata. From strata 1 through 8 there were only atlatl and dart items, whereas strata 12 to 16 contained only bow and arrow items. Strata 9 and 10 contained a mixture of both weapons and there were no occurrences of either type in strata 11. However, Dalley identified two weaknesses in the interpretation. First, a stratum rather than an artifact was dated and secondly, the inferences were based on few and fragmentary artifacts which some of them had a lack of distinctive characteristics.

== Summary ==
Four distinct cultural patterns that succeed one another at the cave were identified, named Units I through IV. They were categorized by distinctive artifact types and frequencies, as well as distinctive patterns of plant and animal species distribution.

=== Unit I (6400–1250 B.C.) ===
The materials from Strata 1 through 8 defined Unit I. Unit I resembled the Desert culture where a way of life was based on seed gathering, primarily pickleweed, and small and large game hunting, mostly pronghorn, deer, and bison. Studies conducted by Fry and Kelso suggested that the tiny seed of the pickleweed was the dominant vegetal food. Milling stones were used for seed processing; projectile points, darts, and spears were used for hunting. There were remains of a domestic dog found in Unit I. Haag has suggested that they were a source of food, but not major one as the dog bones were broken and scattered with other food bones. There were also evidence of intensive occupation of the cave during this period through the abundance and variety of artifacts.

=== Unit II (1250 B.C.–A.D. 400) ===
The materials from Strata 9 through 11 defined Unit II. Prof. There was a dramatic cultural shift from Unit I to Unit II, shown from a striking decline in number and variety of artifacts, which might suggest a new pattern of resource use and infrequent visits to the cave. There was also a marked decline in the use of milling stones and manos, which Harper and Alder suggested might be due to the recession of the lake that reduced the suitability for growth of pickleweed. The importance of bison and pronghorn became more emphasized than in Unit I but evidence showed a loss of interest in deer, rabbits, and the total disappearance of waterfowl. New hunting equipment such as bow and arrow were used as seen from fragments of arrows. Basketry fragments were also found but in low frequency. Aikens suggested that the primary function of basketry was related to collecting and processing of plant seeds and this low usage coincided with the reduced intake of pickleweed.

=== Unit III (A.D. 400–1350) ===
Strata 12 through 14 were used to define Unit III. Milling stones and manos continued to be low in use during this period. Coprolite analysis suggested a decline in pickleweed seed, and plant macrofossils analysis showed similar results and also indicated that sagebrush became an important source of food. In Cutler's study, shelled maize was found but there were no cobs or husks, suggesting that maize was brought to the site from elsewhere. In this Unit, Bison overtook pronghorn as the main large game hunting. Numerous small, chipped stone arrowpoints and fragments of arrows were found but no fragments of atlatl were identified. The usage of basketry was similar to Unit II, and the first pottery from the site was identified in Unit III. They were identified as ollas and jars and five of them were referable to the Fremont culture and one of them was Shoshoni ware. Red-painted bone splinters and Fremont style moccasins became common for the first time during this era.

=== Unit IV (A.D. 1350–1850) ===
The materials recovered from Strata 15 and 16 were used to define Unit IV. There was a marked decline in artifacts and an almost complete disappearance of distinctive objects such as those found in Unit III, which could suggest a radical change of cultural ecology in Utah. The number of milling stones and manos continued to be small and sagebrush and grasses continued to be the main sources of vegetal food. The most important activity remained hunting, and bison and pronghorn were still the most hunted animals. Hide artifacts such as thongs and fragments of rabbit fur robes were found and pottery sherds continued to be seen but few were Fremont, causing Aikens to observe that they were most likely out of context in Unit IV.

== Conclusion ==
Professor Aikens emphasized in his book that Hogup Cave was only one of the settlements that were occupied during the course of a seasonal round, with the whereabouts of the sometime occupants during the rest of their economic cycle being unknown. Aikens pointed out that his study defined only a part of the total cultural system. Therefore, he proposed that to understand fully the changing systems of cultural ecology, those sites which had other activities had to be found and excavated.

== Selected papers and monographs ==
- Aikens, C. Melvin (1966). “Fremont-Promontory-Plains Relationships”, University of Utah Anthropological Papers, No. 82. The University of Utah Press: Salt Lake City.
- Aikens, C. Melvin (1967a). “Plains Relationships of the Fremont Culture: A Hypothesis”, American Antiquity, 32(2), p. 198-209.
- Aikens, C. Melvin (1967b). “Excavations at Snake Rock Village and the Bear River No. 2 Site”, University of Utah Anthropological Papers, No. 87. The University of Utah Press: Salt Lake City.
- Aikens, C. Melvin (1969a). “Hogup Cave: Chronology and Archeology”, Abstracts of Papers, 34th Annual Meeting of the Society for American Archaeology, p. 1-2.
- Byers, David A. and Hill, Brenda L. (2009). “Pronghorn Dental Age Profiles and Holocene Hunting Strategies at Hogup Cave, Utah”, American Antiquity, 74(2), p. 299-321.
- Fry, Gary F. (1976). “Analysis of Prehistoric Coprolites from Utah”, University of Utah Anthropological Papers, No. 97. The University of Utah Press: Salt Lake City, 45pp.
- Gunn, Joel (1975). “An Envirotechnological System for Hogup Cave”, American Antiquity, 40(1), p. 3-21.
- Hockett, Bryan S. (1994). “A Descriptive Reanalysis of the Leporid Bones from Hogup Cave, Utah”, Journal of California and Great Basin Anthropology, 16(1).
- Jennings, Jesse D. (1953). “Danger Cave: A Progress Summary”, El Palacio, 60(5), p. 179-213.
- Jennings, Jesse D. (1957). “Danger Cave”, University of Utah Anthropological Papers, No. 27. The University of Utah Press: Salt Lake City. Also released as Memoirs of the Society for American Archaeology, 14.
