= Thomas Jefferson High School (Brooklyn) =

Public school in New York City

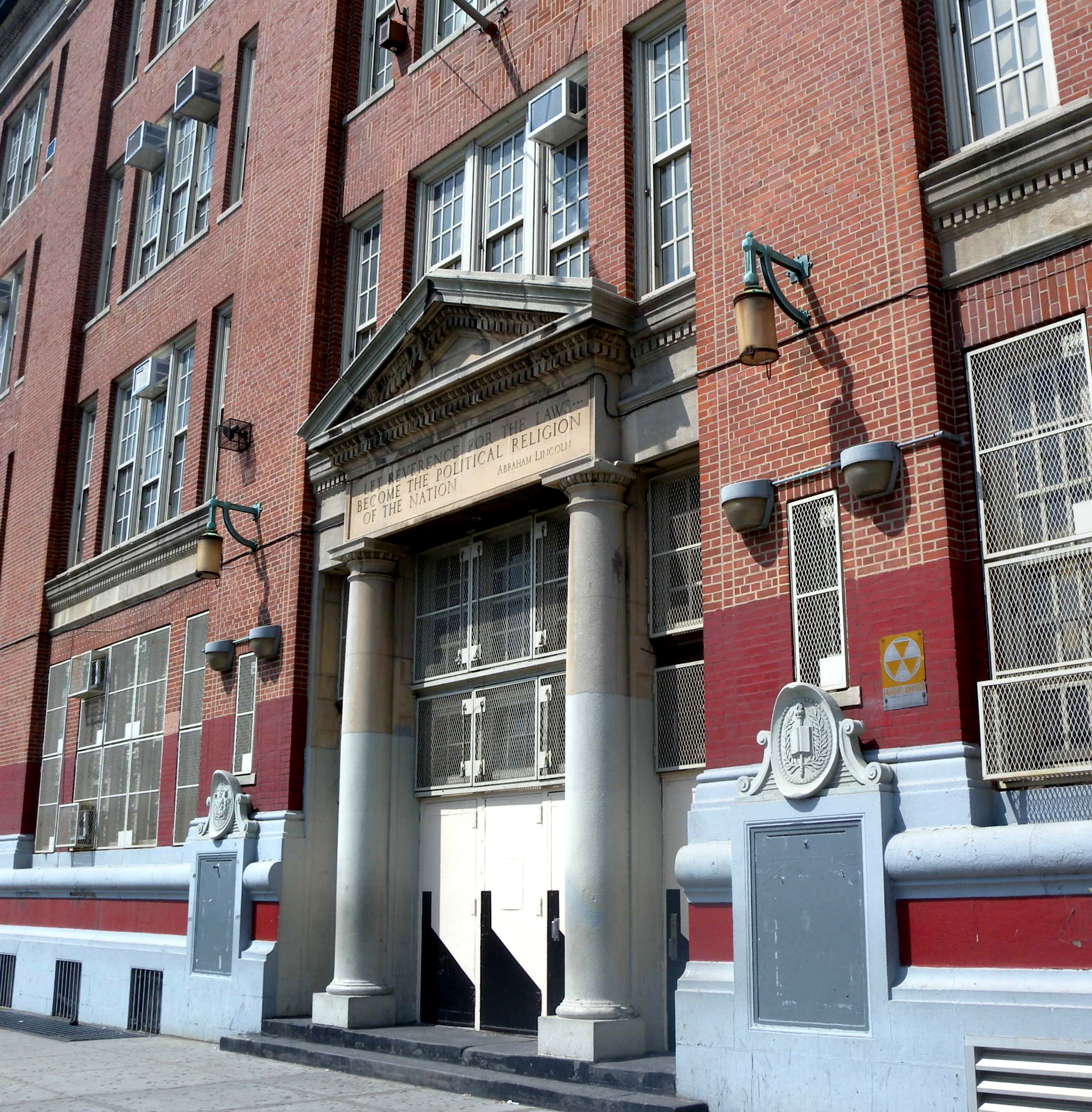

Location
- 400 Pennsylvania Avenue; Brooklyn, New York 11207; United States; 40°40′01″N 73°53′41″W

Information
- Funding type: Public
- Established: 1922
- Closed: 2007
- Grades: 9-12
- Enrollment: 3804
- Yearbook: Aurora

Thomas Jefferson High School was a high school in the East New York neighborhood of Brooklyn in New York City. It was the alma mater of many people who grew up in the Great Depression and World War II and rose to prominence in the arts, literature, and other fields. In 2007, the New York City Department of Education closed the school and broke it into several small schools because of low graduation rates.

== History ==
Thomas Jefferson High School, located at 400 Pennsylvania Avenue, had its groundbreaking in 1922 with New York City mayor John Francis Hylan officiating.

Elias Lieberman (1883–1969), American poet, writer and educator, known for the 1916 poem "I Am an American," served as principal from 1924 to 1940. Alumni of his time include movie star and comedian Danny Kaye (who did not graduate) and songwriter Jack Lawrence. Additionally, Thomas Jefferson was one of seven public high schools in New York to receive a M. P. Moller pipe organ in 1926. The instrument was removed and discarded in the 1990s.

A relatively prosperous lower middle class community throughout the interwar epoch, the surrounding neighborhood of East New York faced a host of socioeconomic problems in the mid-to-late 20th century, including widespread unemployment and crime stemming from a lack of private investment (exemplified by redlining, mortgage discrimination and the gradual diminution of remunerative manufacturing jobs) amid the segregated wave of postwar suburbanization. On November 26, 1991, Darryl Sharpe, a ninth-grade student who was an innocent bystander, was shot to death in the school. Another youth was trying to help his brother in a fistfight, drew a gun, and opened fire in the crowded hallway. The three shots killed the 16-year-old student and critically wounded a teacher, Robert Anderson, who was approaching to intervene. At the time, education officials in New York called it "one of the school system's worst crimes" and noted that besides an accidental shooting in 1989, it was the first killing of a student in a school in more than a decade. The 14-year old shooter, Jason Bentley, was sentenced to three to nine years in prison for second degree manslaughter. Bentley was on parole for this homicide on June 22, 1997, when Luis Cabral Corcino was murdered in a robbery. Bentley was convicted of murder and was sentenced to 35 years to life.

On February 26, 1992, a 15-year-old student at the school shot two other students, who died thereafter, in the hallway an hour before then-mayor David Dinkins was supposed to tour the school. The victims were 17-year-old Ian Moore and 16-year-old Tyrone Sinkler. In 1993, the shooter, Kahlil Sumpter, was sentenced to between 6 2/3 and twenty years in prison after being convicted of manslaughter. He was released on parole in 1998.

In 2007, the New York City Department of Education closed the school and broke it into several small schools because of low graduation rates.

In the photograph above, the main entrance of TJHS is clearly engraved with a quote from Abraham Lincoln, "May reverence for the laws become the political religion of the nation." For 90 years students, and perhaps faculty, have wondered why the authorities were unable to find an appropriate quotation from Thomas Jefferson himself to grace the entrance to his namesake school.

== Today ==
Since 2007, the school building is known as the Thomas Jefferson Educational Campus, and is the home of:

- The High School for Civil Rights
- The FDNY High School for Fire and Life Safety
- The Performing Arts and Technology High School
- The World Academy for Total Community Health High School

In 2015, two of the new schools were graduating about 70 percent of their students and the other two have graduation rates in the 50s. In New York City overall in 2015, just over 78 percent of New York State students who entered high school in 2011 graduated on time according to state officials. However, the percentage is 88 percent for white students and only 65 percent for black and Hispanic students during the same time period.

== Notable alumni ==
- Harvey Averne, 2x Grammy winner
- Howard E. Babbush, lawyer and politician
- Ralph Bakshi, animator
- Sandy Baron, comedian and stage, film, and television actor
- Roy C. Bennett, popular music composer
- Lloyd Blankfein, former CEO of Goldman Sachs
- Riddick Bowe, boxer
- Harry Boykoff, NBA basketball player
- John Brockington, Ohio State Buckeyes' 1968 undefeated national championship football team; running back for the NFL Green Bay Packers
- Henry Cohen, director of Föhrenwald, Displaced Persons camp in post-World War II Germany
- Hy Cohen (born 1931), Major League Baseball player
- Dorian Daughtry, baseball player and criminal
- Hal David, lyricist of pop songs, partnered with Burt Bacharach
- Owen Dodson, poet and novelist
- Shawon Dunston, major league baseball player
- Leroy Ellis, former NBA center, 1971–72 Los Angeles Lakers championship team
- Sylvia Fine, lyricist
- Mel Finkelstein, Pulitzer Prize-nominated photographer
- Jack Garfinkel former Boston Celtics player
- Hy Gotkin basketball player
- Sidney Green, NBA player
- Sharon Jones, soul singer
- Danny Kaye (born David Daniel Kaminsky), actor
- Ezra Jack Keats (born Jacob Ezra Katz), illustrator and author of children's books
- Daniel Keyes, author: Flowers For Algernon
- Harry Landers, actor
- Jack Lawrence, songwriter
- Steve Lawrence (born Sidney Leibowitz), popular music singer, and actor
- Bernard Lepkofker, competitive judoka
- Joel S. Levine, planetary scientist, author, and research professor in applied science at the College of William & Mary
- Al Lewis, actor, political activist
- Lil' Fame, rapper and member of M.O.P.
- Irving Malin, literary critic
- Paul Mazursky, Hollywood director
- Jim McMillian, former NBA forward, 1971–72 Los Angeles Lakers championship team
- Scott Meredith, literary agent
- Alan B. Miller, founder, chairman and CEO of Universal Health Services
- Boris Nachamkin (born 1933), NBA basketball player
- Linda November, singer
- Shamorie Ponds, basketball player who played for the Toronto Raptors, currently plays in Mexico
- Martin Pope, physical chemist
- Jacob Rabinow, engineer and inventor
- Jack Rollins, film and television producer and talent manager of comedians and television personalities
- Willa Schneberg, poet
- Lloyd Sealy, First Black American to graduate from the FBI national academy.
- Phil Sellers, former NBA player
- Francine Shapiro, psychologist, founder of EMDR Therapy
- Jimmy Smits, actor
- Olga Soffer, professor of anthropology
- Sid Tanenbaum (1925–1986), professional basketball player
- Martin Tytell, manual-typewriter expert
- Moses M. Weinstein, lawyer and politician
- Allen Weisselberg, businessman
- Saul Weprin, attorney and politician
- Otis Wilson, linebacker for NFL Chicago Bears
- Shelley Winters, actress
- Max Zaslofsky, NBA guard/forward, one-time FT% leader, one-time points leader, All-Star, ABA coach
- Howard Zinn, historian, political activist
