= Old Swan =

Neighbourhood of Liverpool, England

Coordinates: 53.4135°N 2.9139°W

- Location within Merseyside
- Population: 15,596 (2021)
  - Density: 6,211.60/km2 (2398.32 sq mi)
- OS grid reference: SJ390915
- Metropolitan borough: Liverpool
- Metropolitan county: Merseyside
- Region: North West
- Country: England
- Sovereign state: United Kingdom
- Post town: LIVERPOOL
- Postcode district: L13
- Dialling code: 0151
- Police: Merseyside
- Fire: Merseyside
- Ambulance: North West
- UK Parliament: Liverpool Wavertree

Old Swan is an eastern neighbourhood of Liverpool, Merseyside, England, bordered by Knotty Ash, Stoneycroft, Broadgreen, Fairfield and Wavertree. At the 2021 Census, the population was 15,596.

== Name origin ==
Old Swan is centred on the road junction between Prescot Road, running east to west, Derby Lane (from the north) St Oswald Street (from the south) and Broadgreen Road (from the south-east). It is named after a public house called the Three Swans, which served the pack-horse route along Prescot Lane (now Prescot Road) in the 18th century. The name was derived from the coat of arms of local landowners, the Walton family.

== Geography ==
The A57 road passes through Kensington and Fairfield before running through Old Swan and then through Knotty Ash, towards Prescot and on to St Helens.

Housing in the district is mostly in densely packed terraced houses, though there are exceptions. Doric Park is tucked away behind rows of terraced houses. Liverpool Shopping Park runs parallel to Old Swan.

== Demography ==
According to the 2021 UK census, the population of the Old Swan was 15,596. 86.3% of the population was White; the next largest ethnic groups were Asian, Asian British or Asian Welsh (4.8%) and Other ethnic group (3.4%). 59.4% of residents held a British-only national identity, with a further 14.4% identifying as English only, and 15.8% identifying as both British and English-only.

92.0% of households had all adults speaking English as a main language; 4.7% of households had no members speaking English as a main language.

61.6% of residents were Christian and 27.5% had no religion; the next largest religious group was Muslim at 3.9%.

Of 7,097 households in the ward, 38.5% were one-person households. Out of a workforce of 6,833 people in employment, the largest industry was human health and social work activities (21.3%), followed by wholesale and retail trade (16.6%) and education (8.9%). 16.3% of those employed worked in professional occupations. 19.0% of people in the ward were aged 35–49, and 21.1% were aged 50–64, making these the two largest age groups.

== Services ==
=== Health ===
There are numerous primary care services located within Old Swan, including a NHS walk-in health centre, along with an urgent care unit, a GP practice on Derby Lane, and several pharmacies and opticians.

There are also several dentists practices within the ward.

Old Swan also has an emergency ambulance station which is located on St. Oswalds Street.

=== Education ===
There are six schools in Old Swan, including Broadgreen Primary School, St Anne's Stanley C of E Primary, St Oswald's Catholic Primary, Corinthian Avenue Primary, St Cuthbert Catholic Primary and Dixons Broadgreen Academy, a secondary school with an adjoining sixth form. There are also several nurseries in the area.

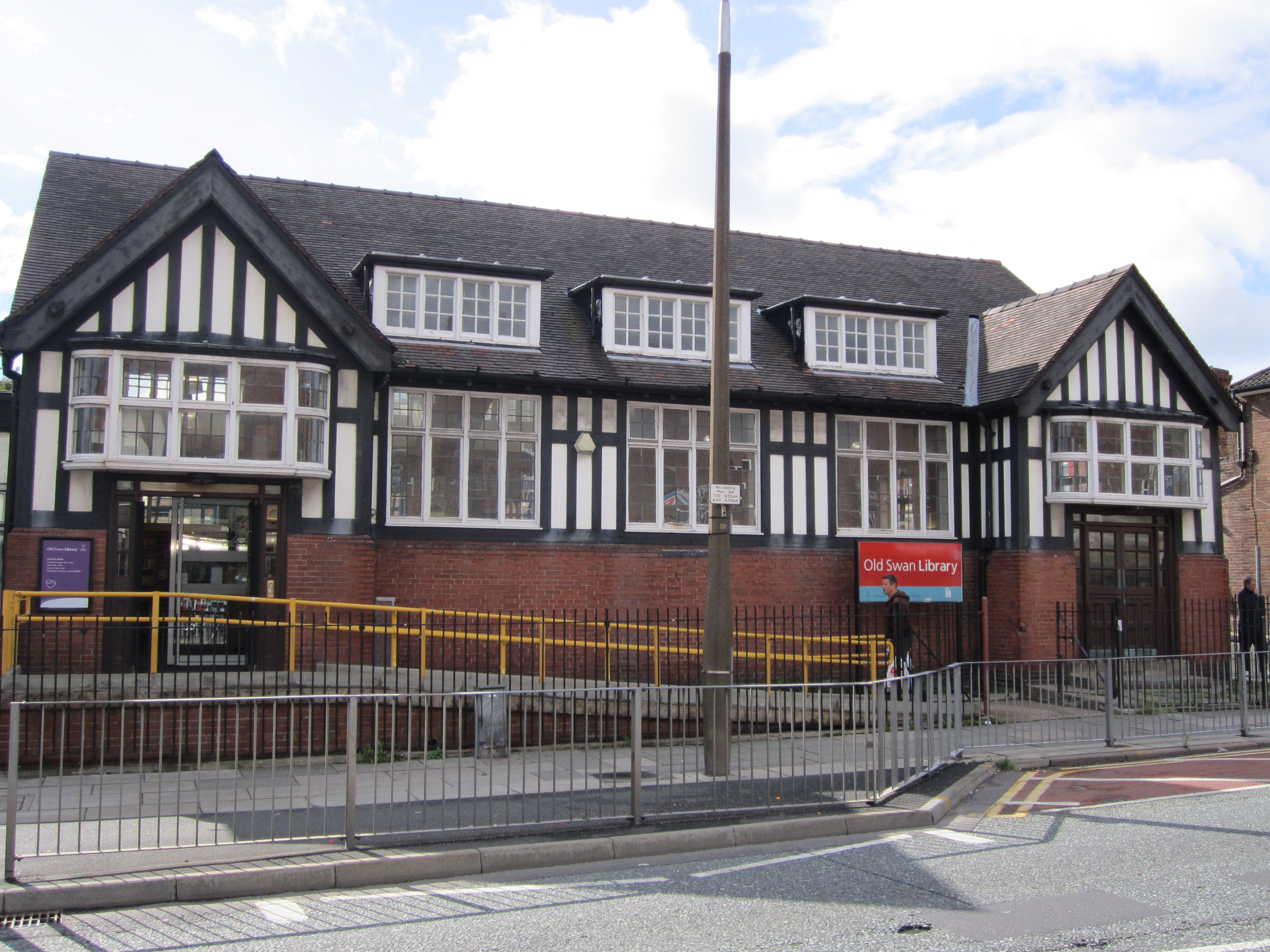
Old Swan Library

Old Swan library is managed by Liverpool City Council. It was built with Victorian black and white features, originally opening in 1913 as a reading room, and has its own garden, the entrance to which is on the A57.

=== Places of worship ===
The Parish Church is St Anne's on Prescot Road. In September 2022, Lady Dodd endowed stained glass windows at St Anne's Church, in memory of her late husband, Ken Dodd.

== Local government ==
Up to 2023, Old Swan's representation on Liverpool City Council was largely through the Old Swan ward, one of 33 districts each returning three councillors. Following a re-organisation of council seats, Old Swan is now represented by two single-member wards: Old Swan West (councillor William Shortall (Labour Party), and Old Swan East (councillor Mark Johnson (Labour Party)).

Old Swan is represented by Paula Barker MP (Labour Party) and is in the parliamentary constituency of Liverpool Wavertree; prior to the constituency's re-creation the area was part of Liverpool Broadgreen.

== Economy ==
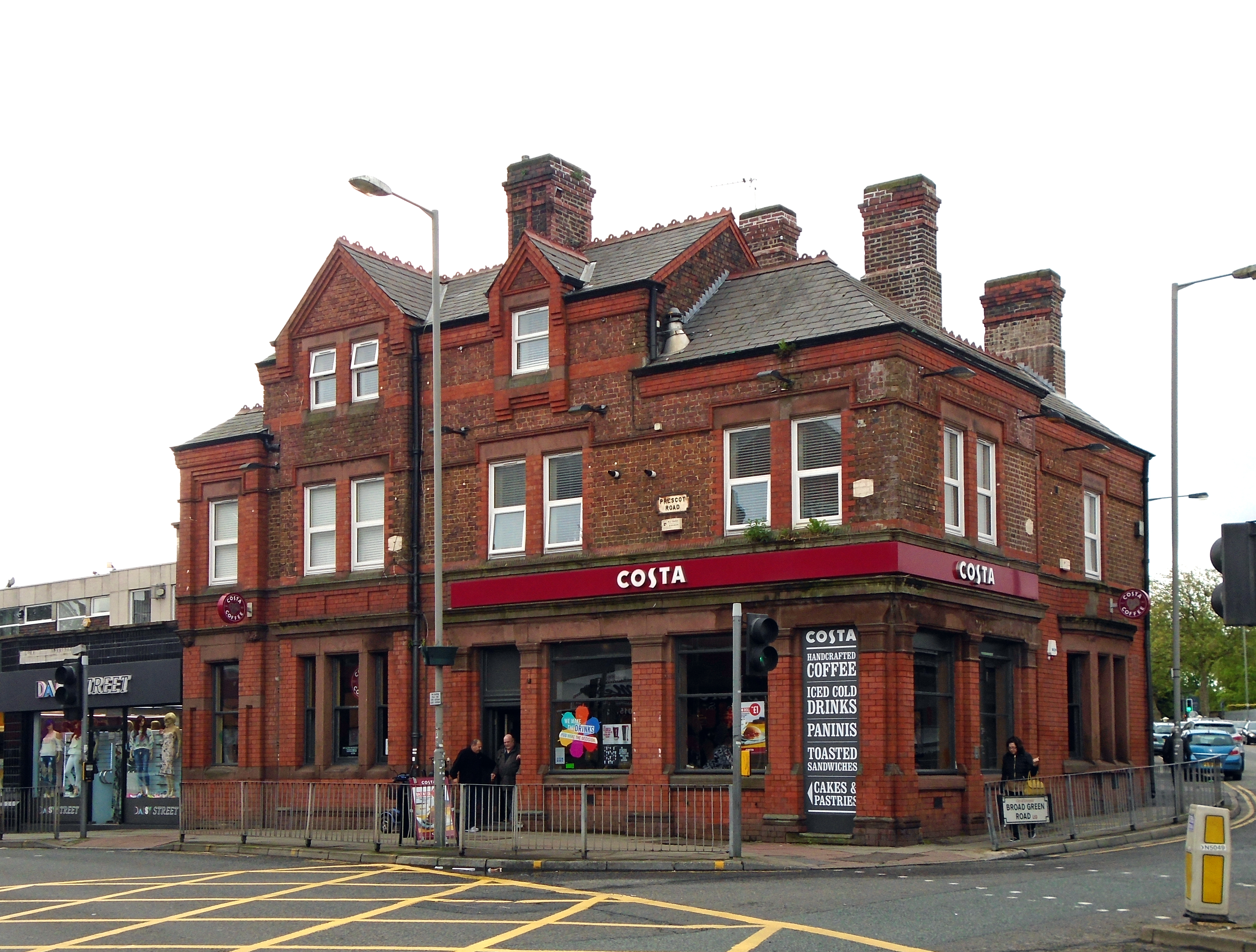
Costa Coffee

=== History ===
Several regionally dominating enterprises have roots within Old Swan. In 1912, Old Swan became home to the first Sayers bakery, a large independent retail bakery within the North West of England. In 1976, Tom Morris opened the first Home Bargains store (then Home and Bargain) within Old Swan.

=== Present ===
Old Swan has a varied collection of clothes and food shops situated along Prescot Road serving local residents. In addition, the area is also served by large supermarkets and other shops.

== Transport ==
=== History ===
The Old Swan Tramway was one of the first street tramways in Britain, opening in 1861.

The Merseytram System (Line 2) was due to run through Old Swan but was later cancelled after funding from the British Government was denied.

=== Present ===
Fairly regular bus routes 7, 8, 9 and 10/10A/10B connect Old Swan to Liverpool City Centre and in the opposite direction to Huyton, Prescot, St Helens and Warrington. Old Swan has other bus links - routes 60, 61, 62, 68/68A, 81/81A and 102, which do not serve Liverpool City Centre but provide important links to other areas of Liverpool including Aigburth, Anfield, Bootle, Childwall, Clubmoor, Croxteth, Fazakerley, Hunt's Cross, Mossley Hill, Norris Green, Orrell Park, Speke, Toxteth, Tuebrook, Walton, Wavertree, West Derby, Woolton and Liverpool John Lennon Airport.

There is a bus depot in Old Swan on Green Lane. It is owned by Arriva North West.

The M62 motorway starts at the end of Broadgreen Road out of the city, and is the east gateway into the city via Edge Lane Drive.

The nearest railway stations to Old Swan are Broad Green railway station and Wavertree Technology Park railway station. Both are operated by Northern and served by local stopping trains to and from Liverpool Lime Street.

== Notable residents ==
- Former Manchester United manager Ron Atkinson was born in Old Swan.
- Judith Berry (nee. Hawkins), mother of Academy Award-winning American actress Halle Berry, was born in Old Swan.
- Alan Caldwell, known as Rory Storm, rock and roll singer of the late 1950s and early 1960s. He was born in Old Swan in 1939, was a member of Old Swan Boys' Club (1956–57) and attended St Margaret's Anfield School.
- Dennis Evans, former captain of Arsenal F.C., was born in Old Swan.
- Alice "Bunny" E. (née Hind) and Eric Myers, parents of Canadian comedian Mike Myers, were from Old Swan.
- Tommy Scott, lead singer with 1990s band Space lived in Old Swan at the height of their fame.
- Jazz saxophonist Ken Stubbs, leader of First House, was born in Old Swan.
