= Old Swan Tramway =

Former tramway in Liverpool, England

Operation
- Locale: Old Swan and Fairfield, Liverpool
- Open: 26 July 1861
- Close: 1862
- Status: Closed
- Owners: Liverpool Road and Railway Omnibus Company Ltd

Infrastructure
- Propulsion system: Horse-drawn

The Old Swan Tramway operated a horse-drawn tramway service in Liverpool from 1861 to 1862.

== History ==
The Liverpool Road and Railway Omnibus Company was formed in 1860 by local horse-drawn omnibus proprietors, including William Busby, John Gates and Thomas Lloyd. They obtained permission from the trustees of the Prescott turnpike road to lay down a line of rails between the borough boundary at Fairfield to the Old Swann.

Construction started in June 1861. The rail was laid in the centre of the road and consisted of an iron plate four inches broad with a flange on each edge rising 3/8 in (9.5 mm), leaving a groove for the wheel. The tops of the flanges were level with the road surface. The space between the rails was paved with granite sets and the line extended for 1.5 miles (2.4 km). The rail carriages were designed to accommodate 40 passengers and were built by the Oldbury Carriage Works in Birmingham. The construction cost in the region of £2,000 (equivalent to £205,800 in 2025). A trial trip took place over the tramway on 2 July 1861.

The tramway opened to the public on 26 July 1861.

The company claimed that the trial proved that the rail provided no obstruction and did not interfere with the utility of the road, and applied to Liverpool Council for permission to extend the rails from Fairfield to St George’s Hall. However, permission was not granted.

The tramway is thought to have closed in 1862.
