= Dorrian =

Dorrian is a surname. Notable people with the surname include:

- Alex Dorrian (born 1946), Scottish businessman
- Jim Dorrian (born 1931), American soccer player
- Lee Dorrian (born 1968), English singer,
- Leeona Dorrian, Lady Dorrian (born 1957), Scottish judge
- Patrick Dorrian (1814–1885) was an Irish Roman Catholic Prelate, 23rd Lord Bishop of Down and Connor

== See also ==
- Dorrian's
- Dorian (disambiguation)
- Dorrien
