= Dorien (given name) =

Dorien is a given name, a variant of Dorian. Dorian comes from the Greek name "Doros", which means "gift from God".

People and characters with this name include:

== Men ==
- Dorien Bryant (born 1985), American former footballer (male)
- Dorien Wilson (born 1963), American actor

== Women ==
- Dorien DeTombe (born 1947), Dutch sociologist
- Dorien Herremans (born 1982), Belgian computer music researcher
- Dorien Rookmaker (born 1964), Dutch politician
- Dorien de Vries (born 1965), Dutch sailor
- Dorien Wamelink (born 1970), Dutch former professional tennis player

== Fictional characters ==
- Dorien Green, a female character in the 1990s British TV series Birds of a Feather

== See also ==
- Dorian (name), given name and surname
