= Dorian FitzGerald =

Canadian artist (born 1975)

- Born: 1975 (age 50–51); Toronto, Ontario, Canada
- Education: University of Toronto
- Known for: painting

Dorian FitzGerald (born 1975) is a Canadian artist from Toronto, Ontario. He is known for producing larger sized paintings with acrylic and caulking. Most of his paintings are of various locations FitzGerald has visited such as Elton John's sunglasses collection at his estate in Old Windsor, England or the throne room of the Queluz National Palace in Lisbon. His largest painting entitled "The Hacker-Pschorr Beerhall, Oktoberfest, Munich" measures 12 feet wide by 18 feet high. FitzGerald's work has become widely known in the Canadian contemporary art scene with some of his work being displayed in the Musée des beaux-arts de Montréal, among other institutions.

== Exhibitions ==
- Fabulous Fabergé (2014)
- The Painting Project (2013)
- If The Sun Had A Sound It Would Sound Like This (2011)
- Property Of A Gentleman (2010)
- Empire of Dreams (2010)
- It's a Good Year To Bring Your Credit Card (2009)
- Carte Blanche (2008)
