= Dorian Daughtry =

Dorian Gray Daughtry (born December 1, 1967) is an American former professional baseball player who was convicted of manslaughter for the killing of a nine-year-old girl. Daughtry was an outfielder in the minor-league system of the Seattle Mariners organization between 1987 and 1989. Shortly after returning to Brooklyn in 1990 with the hopes of pursuing a law enforcement career, Daughtry was arrested in connection with a shooting in which a bullet fatally struck a nine-year-old girl. Convicted of manslaughter, Daughtry was imprisoned until he was granted parole in 2005.

== Early life ==
Daughtry was born in Brooklyn, New York. He attended Thomas Jefferson High School, located in a rough part of Brooklyn, graduating in 1986. He then attended Miami-Dade College and then Kingsborough Community College, where he studied criminology. In college, he attracted the attention of scouts from the Seattle Mariners.

== Professional baseball career ==
He was drafted by the Seattle Mariners as the first pick in the 19th round of the 1987 Major League Baseball draft, one selection ahead of future major league pitcher Mike Fyhrie. He was signed by scout Joe Nigro. He played in the minor leagues from 1987 to 1989 for the Bellingham Mariners (1987–89) and San Bernardino Spirit (1989). His minor league roommate was Ken Griffey Jr.

His progress was hampered by a 1988 knee injury, and he struggled to return to form in 1989. In 96 games, he posted a .221/.266/.268 slash line, walking 16 times and striking out 84 times in 298 at-bats.

== After baseball ==
After the 1989 season, Daughtry decided to return to Brooklyn. Rather than continuing in professional baseball, he hoped to pursue a law enforcement career like his sister, an officer in the 77th Precinct of the New York City Police Department. In the meantime, he worked as a security officer and as an employee at a home for the developmentally disabled.

On July 22, 1990, for reasons that were not initially clear, Daughtry fired several bullets on a Brooklyn street. One of the bullets went through a car door and hit a sleeping nine-year-old girl, Veronica Corales, in the head. The child later died at Brookdale University Hospital and Medical Center. Police and prosecutors said that Daughtry had yelled toward a group of people before the shooting, and that one of those people was a man with whom he had an unsettled argument. Bystanders attempted to subdue the gunman after the shooting, but he got away. Daughtry later turned himself in. At trial, Daughtry's attorney said that his client did not have a firearm and that police had pursued the wrong suspect.

Daughtry was acquitted of murder, but he was found guilty of manslaughter and first-degree reckless endangerment. He was sentenced to a maximum of 25 years in prison. In 1996, his conviction was overturned based on the fact that Daughtry's family had not been allowed in court during jury deliberations at the 1991 proceedings. After more legal battles, he was returned to prison in 1998 to finish his sentence; he was granted parole in 2005.
