= Dorian Ngoma =

Congolese footballer (born 1988)

Personal information
- Full name: Dorian Ngoma Bassinga
- Date of birth: 15 May 1988 (age 38)
- Place of birth: Amiens, France
- Height: 1.83 m (6 ft 0 in)
- Position: Forward

Senior career*
Years	Team	Apps	(Gls)
2006–2008	Amiens B		
2008–2010	Beauvais	36	(4)
2010–2011	Mantois	1	(0)
2011–2012	Calais RUFC		
2012–2013	Amiens	17	(0)
2013–2015	Amiens B	36	(3)
2016–2017	US Ailly-Sur-Somme	9	(2)
2017	Saint-Quentin	11	(2)
2018	Granville	10	(0)
2019–2020	Stade Pontivyen	9	(0)

International career
2009	Congo	1	(0)
- * Club domestic league appearances and goals

Dorian Ngoma Bassinga (born 15 May 1988) is a former professional footballer who played as a forward. Born in France, he made one appearance for the Congo national team.

== International ==
Ngoma made a full international debut for the Congo national team on 12 August 2009 in a friendly against Morocco.
