= Jesse D. Jennings =

American archaeologist (1909–1997)

Jesse David Jennings (July 7, 1909 – August 13, 1997) was an American archaeologist and anthropologist and founding director of the Natural History Museum of Utah. Based at the University of Utah, Jennings is best known for his work on desert west prehistory and his excavation of Danger Cave near Utah's Great Salt Lake. Considered an exacting academic scholar and author, he was known for conducting systematic excavations with order and cleanliness.

Jennings was born in Oklahoma City, Oklahoma, on July 7, 1909, and grew up in New Mexico. He began his professional studies at the University of Chicago. In 1935, he married Jane Chase in Washington, D.C. The couple had two sons, David and Herbert. He served in World War II as a naval officer in the North Atlantic. Jennings died in his home in Siletz, Oregon, on August 13, 1997.

== Career ==
In 1929, Jennings began archaeological excavations in the Midwest and Southeast as a graduate student at the University of Chicago. Jennings took several positions with the National Park Service, including serving as the first superintendent of the Ocmulgee National Monument in Macon, Georgia. In 1938 he and his wife dug with Alfred V. Kidder at Kaminaljuyu, Guatemala. His Ph.D. dissertation in 1943 was based on the Guatemala excavations.

In 1948, Jennings left the NPS for the University of Utah, where he taught until his retirement in 1986. Upon arriving at Utah, Jennings drew on his past experience to initiate a state-wide archaeological survey of the poorly known region through extensive surveys and test excavations. During his career, he conducted research and trained students in sites in the Great Basin, the Glen Canyon of the Colorado River, throughout Utah, and in American Samoa.

Jennings's work on Danger Cave in the 1950s was considered ground-breaking due to his exacting standards in excavation and data analysis. Relating the archaeological evidence from Danger Cave to an ethnographic model, Jennings framed a new view of the little-known Great Basin Desert culture. His work in the 1960s in the cultural region of the Ancient Pueblo People near modern Glen Canyon examined the use of agriculture in the canyon lands of southeastern Utah. In 1963, after a funding and development effort spanning twenty years, Jennings opened the Natural History Museum of Utah, the state's natural history museum, located at the University of Utah. From 1980 to 1994, Jennings also conducted graduate seminars as an adjunct professor at the University of Oregon.

== Publications ==
During his career, Jennings produced many professional publications, including reports, reviews, comments, articles, chapters, and monographs. He also wrote textbooks and edited volumes on archaeology.

Selected publications:

- The Importance of Scientific Method in Excavation (Bulletin of the Archaeological Society of North Carolina, Vol. 1, No. 1), (1934).
- Excavations at Kaminaljuyu, Guatemala. Kidder, Alfred V., Jennings, Jesse D., Shook, Edwin M. Shook, with technological notes by Anna O. Shepard. Carnegie Institution of Washington. Publication 561. Washington, D.C. 1946.
- Danger Cave (Society for American Archaeology Memoir No. 14, 1957).
- Glen Canyon: A Summary (Anthropological Papers No. 81, University of Utah, 1966).
- Prehistoric Man in the New World, edited with Edward Norbeck, (Chicago, 1964).
- Prehistory of North America (McGraw-Hill, 1968).
- Accidental Archaeologist: Memoirs of Jesse D. Jennings, autobiography, (University of Utah Press), (1994).

== Honors ==
- Editor, American Antiquity, 1950-1954.
- Executive Board of the American Anthropological Association, 1953–1956.
- Viking Medallist in Archaeology, 1958.
- President of Society for American Archaeology, 1959–1960.
- Vice-President of the American Association for the Advancement of Science, 1961.
- Section H chairman of the American Association for the Advancement of Science, 1971.
- University of Utah Distinguished Professor, 1974.
- National Academy of Sciences, 1977.
- University of Utah, honorary Doctorate of Science, 1980.
- Distinguished Service Award, Society for American Archaeology, 1982.
- Distinguished Service Award, Society for Conservation Archaeology, 1982.
- featured speaker, 50th Anniversary of Society for American Archaeology, 1985.
- Jesse D. Jennings Prize for Excellence established by the Great Basin Anthropological Conference, 1990.
- A. V. Kidder Medal for Achievement in American Archaeology, 1995.
