= Dorrien =

Dorrien is a surname. Notable people with the surname include:

- Carlos Dorrien (born 1948), American sculptor
- Catharina Helena Dörrien (1717–1795), German botanist
- Gary Dorrien (born 1952), American ethicist and theologian
- George Dorrien, Governor of the Bank of England 1818–1820
- Magens Dorrien Magens (1768–1849), English banker, politician, and author

== See also ==
- Dorrien Gardens
- Dorian (disambiguation)
