= Paul Dorian =

Canadian physician

Paul Dorian is a Canadian physician. He is a professor of pharmacology and director of the Division of Cardiology at the University of Toronto. His primary research focus is the clinical pharmacology of antiarrhythmic drugs.

He has been in the news as a consultant on the health effect of using Taser stun guns and as a spokesman for the Heart and Stroke Foundation.

Dorian received his medical degree from McGill University in Montreal in 1976. He continued training in internal medicine and Cardiology at the University of Toronto, and received certification by the Royal College of Physicians and Surgeons of Canada in internal medicine in 1983 and certification in cardiology in 1984. He completed training in clinical pharmacology at the University of Toronto in 1982, and received an MSc in pharmacology from the University of Toronto in 1982. From 1983 to 1985, he completed a Fellowship in cardiac electrophysiology at Stanford University Medical Center in California.

== Selected publications ==
=== For the medical profession ===
- Arrhythmia update, published version of a symposium presented at the Canadian Cardiovascular Society Annual Meeting, October 1995

=== For the lay public ===
- A Change of Heart (with Brian Baker), a "guide to recovery for those suffering from heart disease at any stage, and for those closest to them."
- Recovering from Heart Disease in Body & Mind (with Brian Baker), "examines both the medical and psychological ramifications of coronary heart disease, providing specific physical, mental, and emotional strategies for recovery."
