= Dorian Cooke =

Dorian Cooke (25 December 1916 - 18 September 2005) was a poet, MI6 operative, and head of the Yugoslav section at the BBC.
