= Doric Park =

Park in Liverpool, United Kingdom

- Interactive map of Doric Park
- Type: Public Park
- Location: Liverpool, England, UK
- Coordinates: 53.417485°N 2.911155°W
- Area: 7.5 acres (30,000 m^{2})
- Created: 15 February 1930
- Operator: Liverpool City Council
- Status: Open

Doric Park is located in Old Swan, Liverpool, England. Doric Park's main entrance is located in Wharncliffe Road. The popular local Green Flag park is tucked away behind rows of terraced houses. It is controlled by Liverpool City Council, and has 2.6 hectares of open space.

Doric is one of many parks in Liverpool, that has been awarded with the 2010 Green Flag Award. Stanley and Calderstones Park have also been awarded with the 2010 Green Flag Award.

== History and development ==
At one point the park suffered from vandalism, antisocial behaviour and fly tipping . Many visitors felt that the lack of lighting gave a feeling of unease and consequently the site was underused. Members of the community raised their concerns about the park, which eventually led to the 'Reclaiming Doric Park' project. Public Services from the area set up the Old Swan Foundation and in 2002 Doric Park received a grant from the Countryside Agency Doorstep Green Programme.

From the grant improvements such as the following have been made;

Doric Park Playarea

- In 2005 parts of the park were improved; such as reshaping the park, stone wall seating installed, furniture placed and a network of footpaths created.
- A multi use games area, picnic tables, planting, a feature entrance and mural incorporating community artwork were also added to the park in 2006.
- A table tennis table added in 2008.
- A 'Playbuilder' natural play area added in 2010.

The total cost of the project amounted over £200,000

== Facilities ==
Doric Park has the following facilities:

- Playground for children under 14
- A children's playground roundabout
- Wooden climbing frame
- Grassy hills
- A small fenced football pitch
- Dog mess bins
