= Soviet home front during World War II =

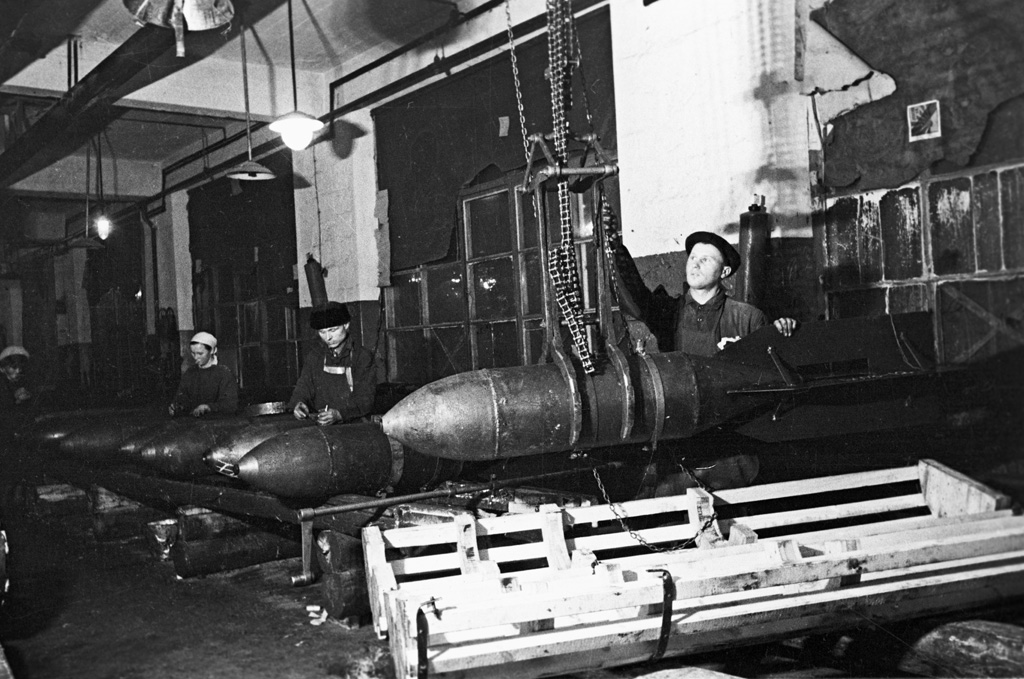
- RIAN archive 611691 Manufacturing airbombs at Moscow plant
| Location | Soviet Union |
| Result | Soviet victory |

Belligerents
| Soviet Union | Nazi Germany; Italy (until 1943); Kingdom of Hungary (until 1944); Kingdom of Romania (until 1944); Finland; (Slovakia) Slovak Republic; (Independent State of Croatia) Croatia; Bulgaria |

Strength
| Tens of millions (roughly) | 3.8 million servicemen (total axis troops) |

Casualties and losses
| 10.4-13.3 million civilians | 3-4 million troops |

The Soviet home front during World War II refers to measures directed at and executed by citizens of the Soviet Union (USSR) to support the war effort during World War II, including mass mobilisation, expanded industrial production, rationing, evacuation and state propaganda.

Mobilisation on the home front operated via draft boards and vocational schools. Civilians could expect to not only be conscripted into the Soviet military but to also be assigned to factories and labour as-needed, anywhere in the USSR.

Civilian life was severely affected by food shortages, scarcity of consumer goods and shortfalls in basic supplies; many urban residents endured overcrowded or otherwise inadequate housing as services and supplies collapsed in the occupied and contested regions. A centrally administered rationing system allocated food and critical goods to wage earners and dependents, shaping daily consumption, labour allocation and household survival strategies across the USSR. Protracted battles and sieges, such as the Battle of Stalingrad or the Siege of Leningrad heavily impacted life in the embattled cities.

Authorities organised large‑scale evacuations of industry, specialists and civilians away from front‑line areas in the western USSR, both to preserve productive capacity and to protect populations where possible; these operations were accompanied by propaganda campaigns that sought to sustain morale, encourage labour discipline and frame sacrifice as patriotic duty.

== Antebellum ==
=== Economy ===
The interwar Soviet economy was dominated by industrialisation with a strong emphasis on heavy industry and military production. Despite rapid industrial growth, urban residents made up only about 33% of the population, and agriculture remained the largest employer, with roughly 53% of the workforce engaged in farming compared with about 20% in Germany. Industrial output had increased but productivity remained uneven, while agricultural productivity lagged significantly behind industrial gains.

=== Interwar Soviet military ===
By 1941, the Red Army had expanded dramatically from about 940,000 in 1936 to roughly five million personnel; however many units were poorly equipped and inadequately trained. The officer corps had been weakened by the Great Purge, which resulted in the imprisonment or execution of large numbers of officers and contributed to problems of command and morale on the eve of war.

Building the Soviet Navy was a national priority, but, as with the Red Army, many senior officers were murdered in the Great Purge. The naval share of the national armaments budget fell from 11.5% in 1941 to 6.6% in 1944. Prior to the war, however, progress at building the Soviet Navy had "not been impressive."

By 1941, the Soviet Air Force (VVS) possessed at least 9,576 frontline aircraft, which technically made it the largest air force in the world. However, its equipment, like that of the Red Army, was largely obsolescent and suffering from prolonged use. The Great Purge not only saw VVS officers murdered, but also aircraft manufacturers and designers being executed or sent to gulags. In 1938 alone, the head of the VVS, Yakov Alksnis was executed and 400 to 500 aero-engineers were arrested from the Commissariat of Aviation Industry. Some 70 were shot and 100 died in forced labour camps. Such purges continued well into 1941. In 1941, the VVS, while having a relatively advanced high-altitude interceptor (the MiG-3), lacked air superiority fighters specialising in low- and medium-altitude aerial combat. The VVS also lacked a heavy fighter design, and struggled with heavy bombers. In-terms of ground attack aircraft, the Ilyushin Il-2 had only recently begun production by 1941.

=== Prelude to war ===
After signing a non-aggression pact with Nazi Germany in 1939, secret "protocols" within the pact called for a joint invasion of Poland by Germany and the USSR, along with a general carving-up of Eastern Europe into German and Soviet spheres of influence. Germany would invade Poland on 1 September 1939, with the USSR following-suit on 17 September 1939. The Allies would declare war on Germany in September 1939; however, the war went well for Germany well into 1941, with France falling to Germany in June 1940. Despite the still-extant non-aggression pact, Adolf Hitler believed that the United Kingdom's refusal to end the war was based on the hope that the United States and the USSR would enter the war against Germany sooner or later. In July 1940, Hitler decided that the Soviet Union should be eliminated and aimed for the conquest of Ukraine, the Baltic states and Byelorussia. In December 1940, Hitler issued the directive to prepare for an invasion of the Soviet Union. On 22 June 1941, Germany would "betray" the non-aggresssion pact and (supported by most of the Axis powers) invaded the USSR, with Germany accusing the Soviets of plotting against them.

== Mobilizations and industrial participation ==
=== Mobilisation and conscription ===
At the outbreak of war, the able‑bodied males were subject to military conscription and the remainder of the population was subject to compulsory labour mobilisation, and late-war home‑front mobilisation involved roughly 15 million additional people. Mobilisation drew on both rural and urban labour reserves and recruited large numbers of women regardless of prior occupation or social status.

=== Labor issues ===
Retention of labour proved difficult: newly mobilised workers were insufficiently trained, poorly housed and inadequately clothed, and large numbers attempted to remobilise or desert under the strain of extreme conditions. Conditions in the Gulag worsened as prisoners received low priority for food and were used for the most physically demanding labour. In 1942–43, when the military economy was under greatest strain, mobilisation extended into Soviet Central Asia to tap additional labour resources.

=== Women participation ===
Moscow Metallurgical Plant roller A. M. Pronyayeva in May 1942

Women played a major role on the home front, replacing the men away in military roles. Women would work in agriculture and took on factory and civil tasks. Their share of labour in kolkhoz and sovkhoz establishments rose from about 40% in 1941 to roughly 53% by 1945, and women made substantial contributions to food production and other essential industries.

=== Industrial re-location ===
Large industrial facilities were dismantled and relocated eastward beyond the reach of German air power to preserve productive capacity and maintain armaments production under wartime conditions.

=== Propaganda mobilizations ===
State propaganda became an important tool on the home front. Early efforts initially struggled to reach ordinary people, especially in the wake of Red Army setbacks, but over time messaging was adjusted to align more closely with popular experience and to tie individual sacrifice to collective and political goals.

== Housing and supply rationing ==
Soviet civilian life was severely disrupted by the conflict. For example, the town of Kamensk‑Ural’skii saw its population rise from about 50,000 to roughly 100,000 within weeks, creating acute housing shortages, an inadequate water supply and little or no functioning sewage system. Medical services were overwhelmed and residents were limited to using public baths only once every 37 days, illustrating the scale of civilian hardship. Another example is Chapaevsk, where 1,400 workers faced severe food shortages and highly insufficient rations. Disease was also common during the war, with tuberculosis rampant in factories.

Professor Wendy Z. Goldman of Carnegie Mellon University argues that the Soviet home front was transformed into a complex and hierarchical provisioning system for total war in which food became the central axis of state policy and daily life. The German invasion produced vast occupied territories and civilian losses, and precipitated an acute "food crisis" that the state met with nationwide rationing and a "provisioning hierarchy" prioritising blue-collar workers, then white-collar workers, dependants and children. State-supplied rations supplied the majority of calories, while decentralised measures (factory‑attached sovkhozy/kolkhozy, contracts with schools and canteens, and support for peasant markets) and an enormous expansion of canteen services mitigated shortages even as malnutrition, scurvy, and starvation surged in 1942–43. By the end of 1945 roughly 80 million people received bread rations from the state, and canteens served about 16 billion meals in 1943. Bread "was the most important part of the ration" with potatoes often used as flour substitutes. Faced with the limits of formal rations, the state also promoted large‑scale improvisation to stretch supplies: ersatz products, vitamin supplement production in factories, and foraging of wild greens. By war’s end these collective and state‑led efforts had become routinised across urban and rural settings, but the human cost was severe and long‑lasting.

== Aftermath ==
The post‑war aftermath on the home front was dominated by reconstruction across vast areas stripped of food supplies, workplaces, housing and clothing. Transport was severely degraded: many movements had to be carried out on foot, motor vehicles were scarce and the surviving horses were largely requisitioned for collective farms. To address food shortages, roughly 12 million new ration cards were issued around the end of the German offensives, but shortages of supplies persisted for many civilians. The Red Army and occupation administrations continued to require substantial material support in formerly occupied territories, further stretching limited resources during reconstruction.

The Russian Academy of Science estimates that civilian losses were at around 13.7 million people, and a 1993 Russian Ministry of Defence report estimated 8.8 million military personnel were lost between 1939 and 1945.

However, the war also galvanized the Soviet population and unified them; The USSR would quickly become a superpower in the years following WWII.
