= Danger Cave =

Coordinates: 40°45′07″N 114°00′57″W

- U.S. National Register of Historic Places
- U.S. National Historic Landmark
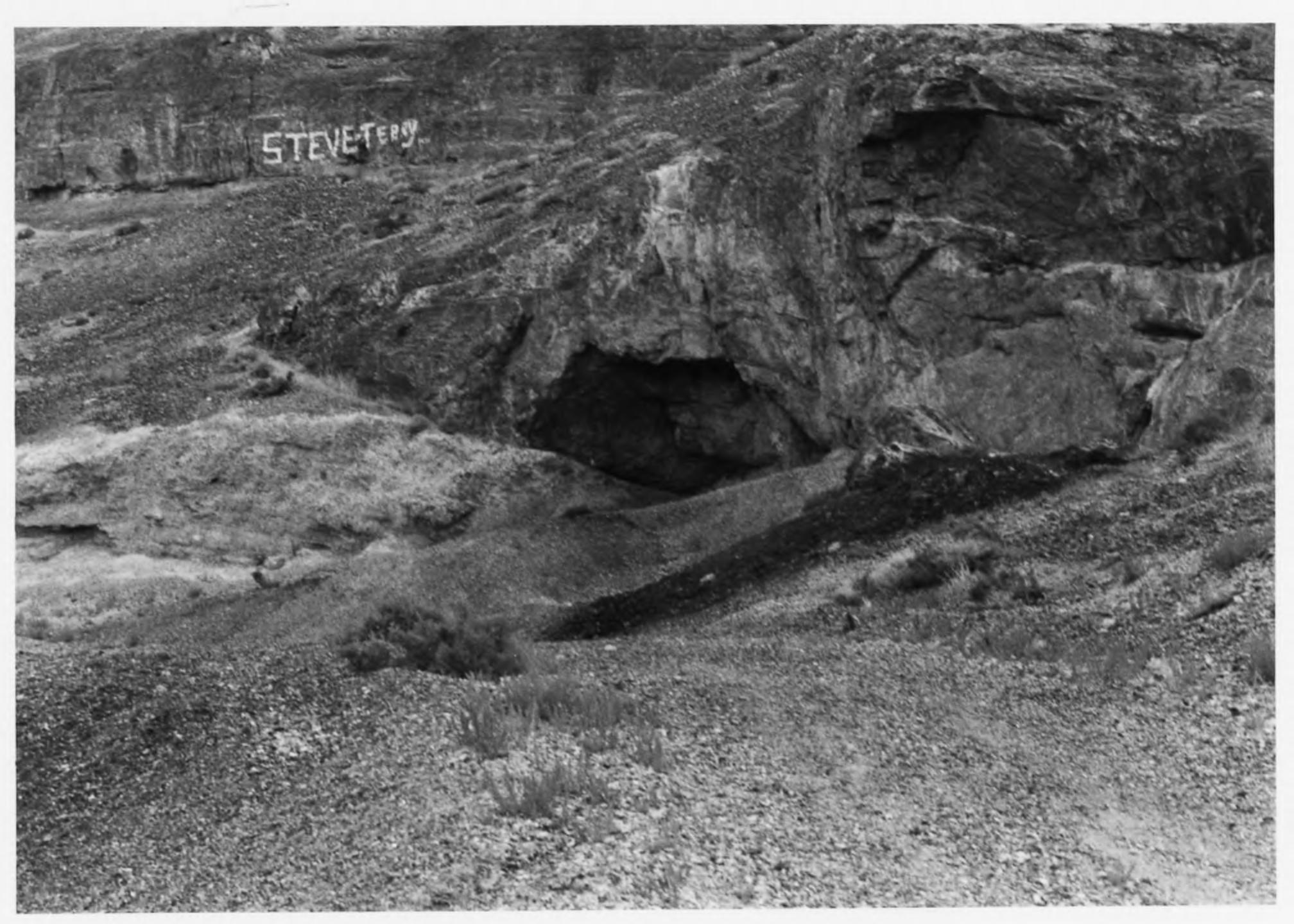

- Location within Utah Location within the United States
- Location: Tooele County, Utah, United States
- Nearest city: Wendover, Utah
- NRHP reference No.: 66000741

Significant dates
- Added to NRHP: October 15, 1966
- Designated NHL: January 20, 1961

Danger Cave is a North American archaeological site located in the Bonneville Basin of western Utah around the Great Salt Lakes region, that features artifacts of the Desert Culture from c. 9000 BC until c. 500 AD. Through carbon-14 dating, it has been determined that there is very little evidence of human life in the Danger Cave area c. 11,000 BP [9000 BC], but there is much evidence of human life by 9000 BP [7000 BC].

Danger cave was first investigated in the 1930s by Elmer Smith, and excavated in the 1950s under the supervision of Jesse D. Jennings, professor at the University of Utah. Jennings' work at the site was considered ground-breaking due to his exacting standards in excavation and data analysis. Though Jenning's findings eventually gained widespread acceptance, his publications garnered both criticism and support at first. Relating the archaeological evidence from Danger Cave to an ethnographic model, Jennings framed a view of the little-known Great Basin Desert culture which was unknown at the time.

The extremely dry cave had created an ideal storage condition that preserved a variety of artifacts from beetle wings to textiles and human paleofeces. They also found leather scraps, pieces of string, nets of twine, coarse fabric, basket fragments, and bone and wood tools such as knives, weapons, and millstones. In total, excavations have produced over 2,500 chipped-stone artifacts and over 1,000 grinding stones. The excavation also yielded identifiable fragments of 68 plant species that still grow today within ten miles of the cave as well as the bones of many species of animals.

The data collected from the cave suggested that the Desert Culture had a sparse population, with small social units numbering no more than 25 to 30 people. The focus on survival prevented the inhabitants from building permanent structures, developing complicated rituals, or amassing extensive personal property. The Desert Culture persisted for thousands of years despite the hardships they faced, and eventually became the basis for other early Utah cultures such as the Fremont.

It was declared a National Historic Landmark in 1961.

The site was looted and many ancient artifacts stolen on 11 May 2019.
