= Dorian Rottenberg =

Translator of Russian literature

Dorian Rottenberg (born 1925) is a translator of Russian literature, specializing in the translation of poetry and children's books. Selected translations include:

- Fifty Soviet Poets by Vladimir Ognev and Dorian Rottenberg
- Selected Works (Vladimir Mayakovsky)
- Tales from M. Saltykov-Shchedrin (Mikhail Saltykov-Shchedrin)
- Selected Works (Hovannes Toumanian)
- Vladimir Ilyich Lenin (Mayakovsky)
- Sarybelli, Osman and Ibrahimov, Mirza (editors). Azerbaijanian poetry : an anthology : classic, modern, traditional. Moscow : Progress Publishers. [662] p. Translated by Tom Botting, Gladys Evans, Olga Moisseyenko, Arthur Shkarovsky, Irina Zheleznova, Louis Zellikoff, Dorian Rottenberg, Eugene Felgenhauer, and Avril Pyman.
- Aitmatov, Chinghiz and Pankov, Alexander (editors). Do the Russians want war? : collection. Moscow : Progress Publishers. 1985. [326] p. Series title: A library of Russian and Soviet fact fiction. Translated by Thomas Cogbill, Robert Daglish, Olga Shartse, Peter Tempest, Sergei Sosinsky, Dudley Hagen, Bernard Isaacs, Fainna Glagoleva, Leonard Stoklitsky, Hilda Perham, Walter May, Dorian Rottenberg, Stephen Coppen, and Tom Botting.
- Yakovlev, B. V. (editor). Lenin in Soviet poetry : a poetical chronicle. Moscow : Progress Publishers. 1st ed., 1980. 318 p. Series title: Lenin in Soviet Literature. Translated by Irina Zheleznova, Dorian Rottenberg, David Foreman, Peter Tempest, Gladys Evans, Alexei Sosinsky, Alex Miller, Robert Daglish, Margaret Wettlin, Tom Botting, and Jack Lindsay.
- Lazarev, L. (editor). Let the living remember : Soviet war poetry. Moscow : Progress Publishers. 1st ed., 1975. [400] p. Series title: Progress Soviet authors library. Translated by Alex Miller, Olga Shartse, Tom Botting, Walter May, Margaret Wettlin, Peter Tempest, Avril Pyman, Dorian Rottenberg, Gladys Evans, Irina Zheleznova, Louis Zellikoff, and Alex Miller.
- Malashenko, V. I. and Sobolov, I. (editors). The Great Baikal-Amur Railway. Moscow : Progress Publishers. 1st ed., 1977. [171] p. Series title: The writer and the time. Translated by David Sinclair-Loutit, Dorian Rottenberg, Keith Hammond, and Janet Butler.
- Sinelnikov, Mikhail (editor). The liberation of Europe. Moscow : Progress Publishers. 1989. [392] p. Series title: Prose, poetry, journalism, memoirs of World War II. Translated by Dorian Rottenberg, Armorer Wason, Vic Schneierson, N. Joel, Richard Dixon, N. Lukoshkova, Synthia Carlile, George Hanna, David Mishne, Walter May, Vladimir Bogomolov, Dudley Hagen, Nancy R. Lasse, Martin Parker, Keith Hammond, Robert Daglish, Blair Scruton, and Maureen Riley.
- Zheleznova, Irina (editor). Vasilisa the beautiful : Russian fairy tales. Moscow : Progress Publishers. 2nd ed., 1974. [213] p. Translated by Irina Zheleznova, Bernard Isaacs, and Dorian Rottenberg.
- Barto, Agnia. Merry Rhymes. Moscow : Progress Publishers. 2nd ed., 1980. [80] p. Translated by Dorian Rottenberg, Avril Pyman, Eugene Felgenhauer, Irina Zheleznova, and Lois Zelikoff.
- Chukovsky, Kornei. The muddle. Moscow : Progress Publishers. 2nd ed., 1980. Translated by Dorian Rottenberg.
- Chukovsky, Kornei. The telephone. Moscow : Foreign Languages Publishing House. Series title: For tiny tots. Translated by D. Rottenberg.
- Emin, Gevorg. Songs of Armenia : selected poems. Moscow : Progress Publishers. 1st ed., 1979. [206] p. Translated by Dorian Rottenberg.
- Mayakovsky, Vladimir. Poems. Moscow : Progress Publishers. 1st ed., 1972. [278] p. Translated by Dorian Rottenberg.
- Mayakovsky, Vladimir. Poems. Moscow : Progress Publishers. 2nd ed., 1976. 302 p. Series title: Progress Soviet authors library. Translated by Dorian Rottenberg.
- Mayakovsky, Vladimir. Rottenberg, Dorian (editor). Selected poetry. Moscow : Foreign Languages Publishing House. [133] p. Translated by Dorian Rottenberg.
- Metchenko, Alexei, Kozhinov, Vadim, Pluchek, Valentin, Rostotsky, Boleslav, Ushakov, Alexander, Pertsov, Victor, Pitzkel, Fainna, Lunacharsky, Anatoly, Chukovsky, Kornei, Pasternak, Boris, Ehrenburg, Ilya, Aseyev, Nikolai, Olesha, Yuri, Svetlov, Mikhail, Fadeyev, Alexander, Tikhonov, Nikolai, Smelyakov, Yaroslav, Tychina, Pavlo, Vurgun, Samed, Faizi, Akhmed, Lukonin, Mikhail, Gamzatov, Rasul, Miezelaitis, Eduardas, and Narovchatov, Sergei. Vladimir Mayakovsky : innovator. Moscow : Progress Publishers. 1st ed., 1976. 312 p. Translated by Alex Miller and Dorian Rottenberg.
- Obraztsov, Sergei. My profession. Moscow : Foreign Languages Publishing House. [255] p. Series title: Arts library. Translated by Ralph Parker, Valentina Scott, and Dorian Rottenberg.
- Saltykov-Shchedrin, M. Tales from M. Saltykov-Shchedrin. Moscow : Foreign Languages Publishing House. [199] p. Series title: Classics of Russian literature. Translated by Dorian Rottenberg.
- Tvardovsky, Alexander. Tvardovskaya, M. (editor). Selected poetry. Moscow : Progress Publishers. 1981. 478 p. Series title: Progress Soviet authors library. Translated by Peter Tempest, Alex Miller, Dorian Rottenberg, and A. Leksis. 8570 copies have been printed.
