= En ven i bolignøden =

1965 film

- Poster by Aage Lundvald
- Directed by: Annelise Reenberg
- Written by: Peer Guldbrandsen
- Produced by: Poul Bang
- Starring: Birgit Sadolin
- Cinematography: Ole Lytken
- Edited by: Maj Soya
- Music by: Sven Gyldmark
- Distributed by: Saga Studio
- Release date: 9 April 1965
- Running time: 86 minutes
- Country: Denmark
- Language: Danish

En ven i bolignøden is a Danish 1965 film directed by Annelise Reenberg and with a script by Peer Guldbrandsen.

== Cast ==
- Birgit Sadolin
- Ebbe Langberg
- Morten Grunwald
- Ove Sprogøe
- Ole Wegener
- Karen Lykkehus
- Jeanne Darville
- Sigrid Horne-Rasmussen
- Gabriel Axel
- Bjørn Puggaard-Müller
- Karl Stegger
- Hans W. Petersen
- Bjørn Spiro
- Ole Monty
- Miskow Makwarth
- Karen Wegener
- Henry Nielsen
- Ebba Amfeldt
- Gunnar Lemvigh
- Knud Rex
- Valsø Holm
- Agnes Rehni
- Knud Hallest
- Bertel Lauring
- Gerda Madsen
- Hugo Herrestrup
- Jørgen Weel
- Freddy Koch
- Poul Müller
