= It's Nifty in the Navy =

1965 film

- Directed by: Finn Henriksen
- Written by: Carl Ottosen
- Produced by: Dirch Passer; Henrik Sandberg
- Starring: Dirch Passer
- Cinematography: Henning Bendtsen
- Edited by: Maj Soya
- Release date: 3 September 1965
- Running time: 105 minutes
- Country: Denmark
- Language: Danish

It's Nifty in the Navy (Danish: Flådens friske fyre) is a 1965 Danish comedy film directed by Finn Henriksen and starring Dirch Passer and Ghita Nørby.

The film follows three young fishermen who get drafted by the Danish navy. Meanwhile, they also have to earn money to pay off their bank loan on their fishing boat.

== Cast ==
- Dirch Passer as Valdemar Jensen
- Ghita Nørby as Hanne Hansen
- Ove Sprogøe as Knud Hansen
- Paul Hagen as Svend Nielsen
- Hans W. Petersen as Peter Hansen
- Carl Ottosen as Kompagnichef
- Kai Holm as Fiskeeksportør
- Jan Priiskorn-Schmidt as Jan Hansen
- Karl Stegger as Bådsmanden
- Preben Mahrt as Chefen
- Sigrid Horne-Rasmussen as Frk. Mortensen
- Bent Vejlby as Befalingsmand
- Katja Miehe-Renard as Lise
- Axel Strøbye as Telegrafist
- Gyda Hansen as Karen
- Hugo Herrestrup as Anton 'Balle' Nicholaisen
- Jesper Langberg as Kok
- Svend Bille as Overtjener Karlsen
- Bjørn Spiro as Kaptajn på færge
- Holger Vistisen as Styrmand på færge
- Kirsten Passer as Svends venindes søster
- Valsø Holm as Spiller billiard med Svend
- Arthur Jensen as Bankdirektør
