= Mine tossede drenge =

1961 film

- Directed by: Sven Methling
- Written by: Børge Müller
- Produced by: Carl Rald
- Starring: Marguerite Viby
- Cinematography: Poul Pedersen
- Edited by: Birger Lind; Ole Steen
- Distributed by: Nordisk Film
- Release date: 17 March 1961
- Running time: 100 minutes
- Country: Denmark
- Language: Danish

Mine tossede drenge is a 1961 Danish family film directed by Sven Methling and starring Marguerite Viby.

== Cast ==
- Marguerite Viby - Gerda Henriksen
- Otto Brandenburg - William Henriksen
- Poul Reichhardt - Ernst Henriksen
- Judy Gringer - Nina
- Palle Huld - Alman
- Einar Juhl - Bogholder Thomsen
- Gerda Madsen - Martha
- Lene Christiansen - Susie Henriksen
- Jan Priiskorn-Schmidt - Tom Henriksen
- Volmer Sørensen - Bartender
- Olaf Ussing - Overlæge
- Kirsten Passer - Williams kollega
- Valsø Holm - Bankkunde
- Bjørn Spiro - Tjener
- Ego Brønnum-Jacobsen - Bankkunde
- Christian Brochorst - Arrangør
