= Majorens oppasser =

1964 film

- Directed by: Sven Methling
- Written by: Dirch Passer; Henrik Sandberg
- Produced by: Peer Guldbrandsen; Dirch Passer; Henrik Sandberg
- Starring: Dirch Passer
- Cinematography: Gustaf Mandal
- Edited by: Sven Methling
- Release date: 14 February 1964
- Running time: 93 minutes
- Country: Denmark
- Language: Danish

Majorens oppasser (transl. The Major's minder) is a 1964 Danish comedy film directed by Sven Methling and starring Dirch Passer.

== Cast ==
- Dirch Passer - Thomas Edison Hansen
- Ove Sprogøe - Major Clausen
- Paul Hagen - 21, Sørensen
- Judy Gringer - Lise Clausen
- Karl Stegger - Oberst Madsen
- Ghita Nørby - Thomas' mor
- Sigrid Horne-Rasmussen - Oberstinde Madsen
- Hanne Borchsenius - Sekretær Frk. Severinsen
- Ebbe Langberg - Psykolog
- Bjørn Spiro
- Ole Monty - Læge
- Bent Vejlby - Sergent
- Holger Vistisen - Menig soldat
- Bruno Tyron
- Poul Thomsen - Oversergent Mikkelsen
- Svend Aage Gotfredsen - Menig Soldat
- Carl Ottosen
