= Don Olsen kommer til byen =

1964 film

- Poster
- Directed by: Anker Sørensen
- Written by: Tage Vandsted (novel); Aage Stentoft
- Produced by: Preben Philipsen
- Starring: Dirch Passer
- Cinematography: Henning Bendtsen
- Edited by: Kasper Schyberg
- Music by: Ib Glindemann
- Distributed by: Rialto Film
- Release date: 18 December 1964
- Running time: 89 minutes
- Country: Denmark
- Language: Danish language

Don Olsen kommer til byen (transl. Don Olsen comes to town) is a 1964 Danish comedy film directed by Anker Sørensen. The film stars Dirch Passer and Buster Larsen.

== Cast ==
- Dirch Passer
- Buster Larsen
- Bodil Udsen
- Birgitte Price
- Marguerite Viby
- Bendt Rothe
- Otto Brandenburg
- Daimi Larsen
- Karl Stegger
- Christian Arhoff
- Arthur Jensen
- Valsø Holm
- Kai Holm
- Ejner Federspiel
- Bjørn Spiro
- Holger Vistisen
- Carl Ottosen
- Jørgen Weel
- Gunnar Strømvad
- Gunnar Lemvigh
- Lotte Tarp
- Ebba Amfeldt
- Aage Winther-Jørgensen
- Gerda Madsen
- Lili Heglund
- Jytte Abildstrøm
- Avi Sagild
- Ole Monty
- Hans W. Petersen
- Preben Kaas
- Jørgen Ryg
- Ebbe Langberg
- Ove Sprogøe
- Preben Mahrt
- Grethe Sønck
- Inger Stender
