= Where Is the Body, Moeller? =

1971 Danish comedy film

- Directed by: Preben Kaas
- Written by: Preben Kaas
- Produced by: Henrik Sandberg
- Starring: Dirch Passer
- Cinematography: Claus Loof
- Edited by: Werner Hedman; Poul Sørensen
- Release date: 22 March 1971
- Running time: 91 minutes
- Country: Denmark
- Language: Danish

Where Is the Body, Moeller? (Danish: Hvor er liget Møller?) is a 1971 Danish comedy film directed by Preben Kaas and starring Dirch Passer.

In this film, unidentified criminals threaten a young woman who has inherited an old house on an island. As a result she seeks help from two private detectives she meets on a ferry.

== Cast ==
- Dirch Passer as Vilhelm Hårlung
- Preben Kaas as Møller
- Sisse Reingaard as Helle Berg
- Jean Squerent as Purser
- Jack Weiss as Gangster
- Johnnie Christen as Sagfører
- Anne Mari Lie as Miss Dean
- Henry Voersaa as Journalist
- Joseph Cordon as Advokat
