= I Belong to Me (film) =

1967 film

- Theatrical poster
- Directed by: Erik Balling
- Written by: Klaus Rifbjerg
- Produced by: Bo Christensen
- Starring: Daimi
- Cinematography: Jørgen Skov
- Edited by: Birger Lind
- Distributed by: Nordisk Film
- Release date: 30 June 1967
- Running time: 100 minutes
- Country: Denmark
- Language: Danish

I Belong to Me (Danish: Jeg er sgu min egen!) is a 1967 Danish musical film directed by Erik Balling and starring Daimi.

== Cast ==
- Daimi – Annie Jensen
- Cæsar – Anders
- Peter Steen – Christian Holgersen
- Ove Sprogøe – Værgen
- Poul Bundgaard – Albert Hyldersen
- Karl Stegger – Tjeneren
- Poul Reichhardt – Kaptajn Sir William
- Henrik Wiehe – Bilist
- Bendt Rothe – Dommeren
- Vigga Bro – Hulda
- Christiane Rohde – Dorothea
- Ole Monty – Bilist
- Else-Marie – Fru Holgersen (as Else Marie)
- Ejner Nørby – Holgersen
- The Defenders – Themselves
- Jørgen Beck – Bonden
- Gunnar Bigum – Bedemand
- Poul Borum – Bartenderen
- Freddy Fræk
- Freddy Grakjær
- Gyda Hansen – Lily
- Lise Henningsen – Luderen
- Lotte Hermann – Rosa
- Edith Hermansen – Bondekonen
- Stig Hoffmeyer
- Inge Hyllested – Opsynet
- Bjørn Spiro – Butleren
- Gert Vindahl
- Kirsten Walther – Fru Hyldersen
- Bent Warburg
