= Vi har det jo dejligt =

1963 film

- Film poster
- Directed by: Gabriel Axel
- Written by: Bob Ramsing; Finn Søeborg
- Produced by: Erik Overbye
- Starring: Dirch Passer
- Cinematography: Henning Bendtsen
- Edited by: Lars Brydesen
- Release date: 1 March 1963
- Running time: 86 minutes
- Country: Denmark
- Language: Danish

Vi har det jo dejligt (transl. We're Doing Alright) is a 1963 Danish family film directed by Gabriel Axel and starring Dirch Passer.

== Cast ==
- Dirch Passer as Thorvald Madsen
- Ebbe Langberg as Henrik Gustafsen
- Lone Hertz as Eva Thorsen
- Karl Stegger as Fabrikant Thorsen
- Ove Sprogøe as Opfinderen
- Bodil Udsen as Opfinderens kone
- Judy Gringer as Madame Decoltas
- Jørgen Ryg as Tryllekunstner Dinga Mingh
- Karen Lykkehus as Fru Jensen
- Hans W. Petersen as Hr. Martinsen
- Ebba Amfeldt as Fru Martinsen
- Svend Bille as Brink
- Arthur Jensen as Købmand Iversen
- Bjørn Puggaard-Müller as Postbud Jensen
- Alex Suhr as Formand
- Jørgen Beck as Læge
- Valsø Holm as Hotelportier
