= Sømand i knibe =

1960 film

- Directed by: Lau Lauritzen Jr.
- Written by: Bob Ramsing
- Starring: Lau Lauritzen Jr.
- Cinematography: Rudolf Frederiksen
- Edited by: Wera Iwanouw
- Music by: Sven Gyldmark
- Distributed by: ASA Films
- Release date: 19 September 1960
- Running time: 104 minutes
- Country: Denmark
- Language: Danish

Sømand i knibe (English: Sailor in trouble) is a 1960 Danish family film directed by and starring Lau Lauritzen Jr.

== Cast ==
- Lau Lauritzen Jr. as Admiral
- Ebbe Langberg as Kaptajnløjtnant Poul Adam
- Hans Kurt as Fabrikant
- Ghita Nørby as Eva Thygesen
- Jeanne Darville as Tove Thygesen
- Judy Gringer as Mette
- Peter Marcell as Søløjtnant Peter Holm
- Ib Mossin as Poul
- Per Wiking as Fessor
- Dirch Passer as Freddy
- Otto Brandenburg as Jesper
- Hugo Herrestrup as Mugge
- Ove Rud as Orlogskaptajn Hede
- Kurt Erik Nielsen as Mester
- Bertel Lauring as Oversergent
- Ole Monty as Bageren
- Ole Ishøj as Søløjtnant
- Bent Vejlby
- Karl Stegger as Mand der fortæller søhistorier
