= Soldaterkammerater på bjørnetjeneste =

1968 film

- Directed by: Carl Ottosen
- Written by: Carl Ottosen
- Produced by: Henrik Sandberg
- Starring: Preben Kaas
- Cinematography: Henning Bendtsen
- Edited by: Birthe Frost
- Music by: Sven Gyldmark
- Release date: 15 December 1968
- Running time: 92 minutes
- Country: Denmark
- Language: Danish

Soldaterkammerater på bjørnetjeneste (transl. Fellow soldiers on a mercy mission) is a 1968 Danish comedy film directed by Carl Ottosen and starring Preben Kaas.

== Cast ==
- Preben Kaas - Private 12
- Paul Hagen - Private 13
- Willy Rathnov - Private 14
- Poul Bundgaard - Private 15
- Louis Miehe-Renard - Private 16
- Carl Ottosen - 1st Sergeant Vældegaard
- Dirch Passer - Guard Commander 419
- Nat Russell - Little Nat
- Karl Stegger - the Colonel
- Anja Owe - The Colonel's Granddaughter
- Ove Sprogøe - Colonel
- Bent Vejlby - Lieutenant Petersen
- Esper Hagen - Guard
- Mei-Mei - Leader of Children's camp
- Ole Monty - The Circus Director
- Else Petersen - The Chef / Miss Petersen
- Yvonne Ekmann - Leader of Children's camp
- Morten Grunwald - Doctor Bjørn Bille
- Tine Blichmann - Nurse Karen
