= The Girl and the Count =

1966 film

Pigen og greven
- Directed by: Finn Henriksen
- Written by: Finn Henriksen; Carl Ottosen
- Produced by: Dirch Passer; Henrik Sandberg
- Starring: Dirch Passer
- Cinematography: Henning Kristiansen
- Release date: 25 November 1966
- Running time: 96 minutes
- Country: Denmark
- Language: Danish

The Girl and the Count (Danish: Pigen og greven) is a 1966 Danish family film directed by Finn Henriksen and starring Dirch Passer and also his daughter Josephine Passer.

== Cast ==
- Dirch Passer - Andreas Lillelys
- Josephine Passer - Lulu Hansen
- Lene Tiemroth - Susanne 'Sus' Hansen
- Peter Steen - Grev Ditmar Gyldenstjerne
- Karin Nellemose - Grevinde Constance Gyldenstjerne
- Malene Schwartz - Irene Gyldenstjerne
- Cleo Jensen - Doris
- Karl Stegger - Søren
- Ove Sprogøe - Nielsen
- Sigrid Horne-Rasmussen - Kokkepigen 'Putte'
- Carl Ottosen - Godsforvalter Lauritsen
- Paul Hagen - Bastian Gyldenstjerne
- Preben Mahrt - Theodor Gyldenstjerne
- Preben Kaas - Skuespiller
- Poul Bundgaard - Skuespiller
- Daimi - Skuespiller
- Bjørn Spiro - Sælger af mejetærsker
