= Krummerne =

Danish film series

- Directed by: Sven Methling (Krummerne 1-3, Krummernes jul); Morten Lorentzen (Krummerne - så er det jul igen); Barbara Topsøe-Rothenborg (Krummerne - alt på spil); Hans Kristensen (Krummernes Jul); Jette Termann (Krummernes Jul)
- Written by: John Stefan Olsen
- Music by: Rasmus Schwenger; Michael Hardinger; Simon Ravn
- Country: Denmark
- Language: Danish

Krummerne, or The Crumbs, is a Danish film series about the family Krumborg and particularly the boy 'Krumme' (Laus Høybye). They are loosely based on Thøger Birkeland's popular children's book series.

The first film in the series, the eponymous Krummerne, was theatrically released on 4 October 1991. Despite indifferent reviews, the film was a commercial success with over 850,000 cinema admissions, becoming one of the most watched films of all time within Denmark. Notable filming took place in Kongens Lyngby and Charlottenlund.

== Films ==
- Krummerne (The Crumbs) – 1991
- Krummerne 2 - Stakkels Krumme (Krummerne 2 - Poor Krumme) – 1992
- Krummerne 3 - Fars gode idé (Krummerne 3 - Father's good idea) – 1994
- Krummerne - Så er det jul igen (Krummerne - Then it's Christmas again) – 2006
- Krummerne - alt på spil (Krummerne - all at stake) – 2014

== Television series ==
Krummernes Jul was released as a 'TV Christmas calendar' series broadcast on TV 2 throughout the month of December 1996 in the lead up to Christmas.

== Cast ==
Characters	Film					Krummernes Jul (1996)
Characters	Krummerne (1991)	Krummerne 2 - Stakkels Krumme (1992)	Krummerne 3 - Fars gode idé (1994)	Krummerne - Så er det jul igen (2006)	Krummerne - alt på spil (2014)	Krummernes Jul (1996)
Krumme	Laus Høybye	Laus Høybye	Benjamin Rothenborg Vibe	Jamie Morton	Victor Stoltenberg Nielsen	Per Damgaard Hansen
Krumme's mother	Karen-Lise Mynster	Karen-Lise Mynster	Karen-Lise Mynster	Vibeke Hastrup	Lisbeth Wulff	Karen-Lise Mynster
Krumme's father (Jens Krumborg)	Dick Kaysø	Dick Kaysø	Dick Kaysø	Dick Kaysø	Henning Valin Jakobsen	Dick Kaysø
Stine (Krumme's sister)	Line Kruse	Line Kruse	Line Kruse	Neel Rønholt	Martine Ølbye Hjejle	Line Kruse
Grunk (Krumme's younger brother)	Lukas Forchhammer	Lukas Forchhammer	Lukas Forchhammer	Julius Bundgaard	Luca Reichardt Ben Coker	Lukas Forchhammer
Boris	Peter Schrøder	Peter Schrøder	Peter Schrøder	Peter Schrøder		
Ivan	Jarl Friis-Mikkelsen	Jarl Friis-Mikkelsen	Jarl Friis-Mikkelsen	Jarl Friis-Mikkelsen		
Caretaker (Svendsen)	Buster Larsen	Buster Larsen	Paul Hagen		Tommy Kenter	Paul Hagen
Ms. Ingeborg Olsen	Elin Reimer	Elin Reimer	Elin Reimer			Elin Reimer
Yrsa	Barbara Topsøe-Rothenborg	Barbara Topsøe-Rothenborg	Liv Forsberg		Annabella Høeg Sørensen	Amalie Dollerup
Schoolteacher	Preben Kristensen				Preben Kristensen	
Tom	Christian Potalivo	Christian Potalivo	Christian Potalivo	Robert Hansen		
Ms. Jensen (Ms. Olsen's neighbour)	Sonja Oppenhagen	Sonja Oppenhagen				Sonja Oppenhagen
