= Dick Kaysø =

Danish actor

- Born: 13 February 1947 (age 79); Nørrebro, Denmark

Dick Kaysø (born 13 February 1947) is a Danish actor.

== Filmography ==
- Mafiaen, det er osse mig (1974)
- Piger i trøjen (1975)
- Strømer (1976)
- Julefrokosten (1976)
- Affæren i Mølleby (1976)
- Normannerne (1976)
- Gangsterens lærling (1976)
- Olsen-banden deruda' (1977)
- Skytten (1977)
- Olsen-banden overgiver sig aldrig (1979)
- Pigen fra havet (1980)
- Olsen-banden over alle bjerge (1981)
- Pengene eller livet (1982)
- Den ubetænksomme elsker (1982)
- Isfugle (1983)
- Forræderne (1983)
- Valhalla (1986)
- Peter von Scholten (1987)
- Ved vejen (1988)
- En afgrund af frihed (1989)
- Dagens Donna (1990)
- Bananen – skræl den før din nabo (1990)
- Krummerne (1991)
- Krummerne 2 – Stakkels Krumme (1992)
- Det forsømte forår (1993)
- Vildbassen (1994)
- Riget I (1994)
- Krummerne 3 – Fars gode idé (1994)
- Kærlighed ved første desperate blik (1994)
- Mørkeleg (1996)
- Mimi og madammerne (1998)
- Send mere slik (2001)
- Jolly Roger (2001)
- Bertram og Co. (2002)
- Arven (2003)
- Møgunger (2003)
- Krøniken (2004–2007)
- Krummerne – Så er det jul igen (2006)
