= Bussen (film) =

1961 film

- Directed by: Arne Skouen
- Written by: Arne Skouen
- Produced by: Arne Skouen
- Starring: Leif Juster
- Cinematography: Sverre Bergli
- Release date: 1961
- Running time: 90 minutes
- Country: Norway
- Language: Norwegian

Bussen
- Directed by: Finn Henriksen
- Written by: Bob Ramsing
- Produced by: Erik Overbye
- Starring: Dirch Passer
- Cinematography: Henning Bendtsen
- Edited by: Lars Brydesen
- Release date: 4 October 1963
- Running time: 90 minutes
- Country: Denmark
- Language: Danish

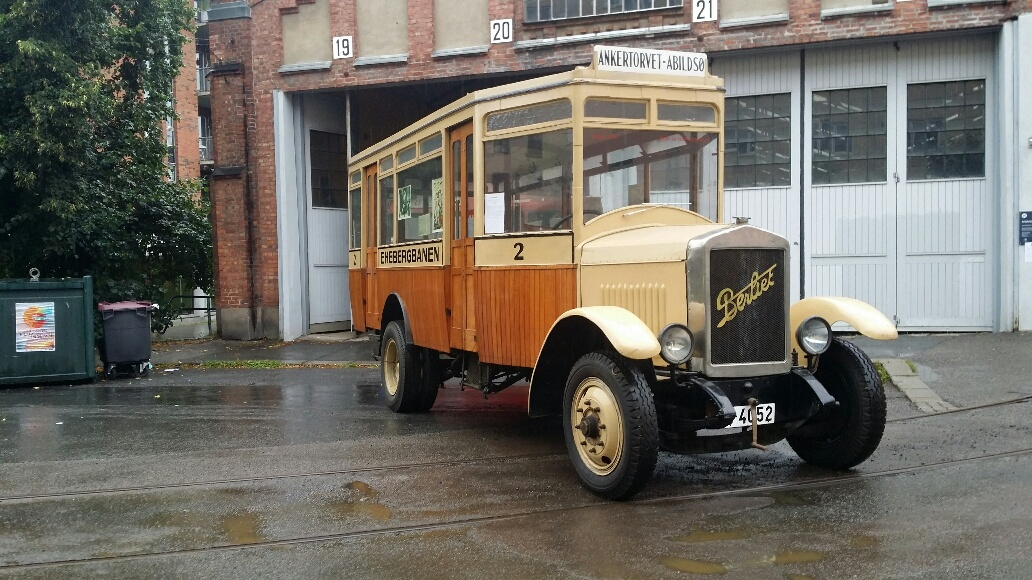
Berliet bus

Bussen (The Bus) is a 1961 Norwegian comedy film, directed by Arne Skouen and starring Leif Juster, and a strikingly similar 1963 Danish comedy film directed by Finn Henriksen and starring Dirch Passer (the texts acknowledge this source at the start of the Danish version). The plot and script (and also a couple of names) are essentially the same in both films. The Danish version is made suitable for a Danish audience. The music to the Norwegian version was written by Maj Sønstevold and Gunnar Sønstevold, with additional songs written by Alf Prøysen. The original main character was written for Leif Juster. At this point in his career, Juster was a popular movie actor. It is possible that Arne Skouen was inspired by a narrative poem written by the poet Ingeborg Refling Hagen, about a milkman who is constantly running errands because of his good heart.

== Norwegian cast ==
- Leif Juster - Busschauffeur Thorvald
- Lalla Carlsen - Klara Tallerud, midwife
- Egil Hjorth-Jenssen - Tallerud, Mayor
- Tore Foss - Haugen, Beadle
- Lasse Kolstad - Lars
- Synne Skouen - Kaja
- Frithjof Fearnley - Fjell-Olsen, clerk
- Arve Opsahl - Måsabjønn (Moss collector)
- Ulf Wengård - Måsabjønn
- Olav Bugge - Måsabjønn
- Kari Sundby - Helga
- Lothar Lindtner - Man from bus company
- Rolf Sand - Socialist
- Helga Backe - (as Helga Bakke)
- Randi Brænne
- Einar Vaage
- Harald Aimarsen
- Henrik Anker Steen
- Hans Coucheron-Aamot (as H. Coucheron-Aamot)
- Edel Eckblad
- Bonne Gauguin
- Mette Lange-Nielsen
- Egil Lorck - Måsabjønn
- Tom Remlov

== Danish cast ==
- Dirch Passer - Buschauffør Martin
- Malene Schwartz - Else
- Lily Broberg - Emma
- Karl Stegger - Sigurd
- Paul Hagen - Kæmneren
- Ove Sprogøe - Vik
- Lone Hertz - Helga
- Axel Strøbye - Lars
- Gunnar Lemvigh - Overbetjent Madsen
- Ole Monty - Inspektøren
- Grethe Mogensen - Marie
- Arthur Jensen - Kromand
- Tove Maës - Sofie
- Valsø Holm - Jesper
- Hugo Herrestrup - Harry
- Aage Winther-Jørgensen - Smeden
- Gunnar Strømvad - Medlem af sognerådet
- Poul Thomsen - Mand der råber efter Lars
- Albert Watson
- Anne Dencker
- Minna Jørgensen
- Lone Lindorff

== Plot ==
The protagonist is a jovial bus driver, well beloved by his passengers, essentially the whole community around him. The bus, however, is old, and needs to be replaced. The bus driver himself is also needed as a handyman for all the people around him, assisting with stray cattle, household machines, children's homework, errands of all kinds, and at one occasion, assisting birth. Progress is however leaving him behind, and the local county council plots on a solution, involving a new bus and driver. The community revolts, and the local midwife (married to the mayor) intervenes with all the locals to keep the bus driver, who ends up keeping his job in a new bus.

=== Differences ===
There are, however, some notable plot differences, mainly based on the casting of the main character. Leif Juster was older than Dirch Passer, and presents a calmer humour. Juster was turning 51, while Passer was 37 at the time of the respective shootings. Passer's interpretation is more Slapstick-based, and the Danish film is made in a more Chaplin-like tradition. The kind humanity of the chauffeur is more present in the Norwegian version. As Passer was younger, the element of romance is more central in the Danish version as well. In both films, the protagonist saves and cares for a small girl (Kaja - played by Synne Skouen, daughter of Arne Skouen in the Norwegian version), whose mother is falling to pieces. In the Danish version, Kaja is cared for by an older sister, who becomes a love interest for the protagonist. In the Norwegian version, the interactment is solely with Kaja, and the mother is passed off as a "lost case". The bus driver is said to have delivered Kaja in the bus, and promises to take care of her as a daughter. "The man being there at birth is the truest father", he says. This plot difference makes the romantic subplot lighter and softer, and the social criticism implied in the Norwegian version is toned down.

Lars, the "dumb muscle" set up to be the driver of the new bus, is a regular "mook" in the Norwegian version, constantly getting into fights because of his physical strength, and urged on by his careless girlfriend Helga. The Danish version makes him an amateur boxer, working for the local smith. Danish Lars seems to be more happy in his situation than his Norwegian counterpart, who actually contemplates suicide because of his messy situation with Helga and the other youths. Norwegian Helga seems to be regarded as a "get around girl", and is passed off as such by Thorvald (and that is why Lars constantly is getting into fights). Danish Helga seems to be more sincere and proper (while still being a slight fanservice - something which also applies for Kaja`s older sister. Fanservice is not used in the Norwegian version).

In the Danish version, Helga and Lars end up engaged, while the Norwegian Helga just breaks out and leaves for town. In Denmark, Helga is the daughter of the local sheriff, while she is working as the sheriff´s clerk in the Norwegian version (or actually addressed as "deputy" by the sheriff). The sheriff`s role is more pointed out in the Norwegian original. Here, he is on Thorvald`s side against the clerk all the way, and while working from inside the law, he also backs the public rebellion against the political leadership. In this way, the sheriff mirrors the historical role of the local lawman as a "man of the people" against the authorities. This trait could not be played out in the same way in Denmark.

The philosophical traits of the driver (reading from the Bible and of Greek philosophers), is somewhat extended in Denmark, turning Martin into a self learned scientist with an astounding knowledge, making experiments in chemistry and physics.

The staged public rebellion is played out differently in the two versions. While the Norwegian version has a regular rebellion against the municipality council, it is the Danish women who act on their own, using a Lysistrata gambit to get their case through. Only in the "second phase" do the men join the uprising. The party bickering between different political fractions inside the county council is actually exaggerated for comedy in the Danish version.

The three moss collectors are not present in the Danish version. The moss collectors, earning their way by selling moss (for isolation, one presumes) and then spending their income on booze, serves as a kind of greek chorus in the film, and relates the background of Thorvald the driver. When he feels the community does not need him anymore, he yields to their wish and follows them to their "natural habitat" in the most reclusive part of the area. The three collectors talk and act as one, as two of them just repeat the words of the leader.

=== Language ===
The Norwegian version leans strongly on Eastern Norwegian dialect, somewhere between the old Oslo dialect and the closely related tongue of Romerike, which is the location of the film. The only person to speak regular bokmål is the antagonist, the county clerk (and some members of the council, equally sceptical until they are set straight). This language trait is lost in the Danish version.

=== Literary reference in the film ===
The bus driver is seen in his humble home, reading a passage about the greek philosopher Diogenes. As he reads, (sitting on a barrel and wearing a towel), he identifies himself with this philosopher, and relates his own version of Diogenes's words in his meeting with Alexander the Great: "Move aside, so that the sun may shine on me". He states that he would like to meet this man.

Kaja, the girl Thorvald/Martin cares for, is rehearsing a poem for her homework. In the Norwegian version, this poem is written by Bjørnstjerne Bjørnson, while her Danish counterpart recites a known Christmas hymn by the Danish national poet N. F. S. Grundtvig.

=== Notes on actors ===
Lalla Carlsen and Leif Juster had already a long experience on working together at stage at this point, acting together in the comedic variety shows in Oslo since before World War II.

While playing completely opposite roles in their respective films, Ove Sprogøe and Arve Opsahl both made a career as the same character some years later, namely Egon Olsen of the Olsen Gang.

=== The bus ===
The bus used in the Norwegian version, driven by Juster, is a 1924 model Berliet with Norwegian built coachwork from A/S Skabo on a type CBOE chassis. It was originally used by the company A/S Ekebergbanen, from 1928 as a reserve and it was taken out of traffic in 1931. After being used in the film it was placed in a museum, since 1983 at the Sporveismuseet(Railroad museum) at Majorstuen, Oslo. In 2013 it was made driveable again and exhibited at an arrangement that took place in Oslo June 2013.
