= Girls at Sea =

Girls at Sea may refer to:

- Girls at Sea (1958 film), a 1958 British film
- Girls at Sea (1977 film), a 1977 Danish film
