= Pigen og drømmeslottet =

- Directed by: Finn Henriksen
- Written by: Finn Henriksen
- Cinematography: Mikael Salomon
- Release date: 20 September 1974
- Running time: 105 minutes
- Country: Denmark
- Language: Danish

Pigen og drømmeslottet (The Girl and the Dream Castle) is a Danish film from 1974, written and directed by Finn Henriksen. The film was Lisbet Dahl's debut as a film actress.

== Plot ==
Tine is in love with the young owner of a beautiful castle, Karsten. She has been dreaming about the castle since she was a small child and visiting her auntie, who is a neighbor to the castle. But an evil plot has been made to take the castle from Karsten.

== Cast ==
- Lisbet Dahl as Tine
- Lars Høy as Karsten Holgersen
- Paul Hagen as Bette Ras
- Karl Stegger as Stub
- Lily Broberg as Berthe
- Joen Bille as Bruno Børgesen
- Anette Karlsen as Sonja
- Karen Lykkehus as Rigmor Vollesen
- Kirsten Rolffes as Emma Holgersen
- Ole Monty as Valdemar Holgersen
