= Me, Too, in the Mafia =

1974 film

- Directed by: Henning Ørnbak
- Written by: Lise Nørgaard
- Produced by: Erik Overbye; Gerd Overbye
- Starring: Dirch Passer
- Cinematography: Claus Loof
- Edited by: Janus Billeskov Jansen; Lizzi Weischenfeldt
- Production company: Saga Studio
- Release date: 27 September 1974
- Running time: 91 minutes
- Country: Denmark
- Language: Danish

Me, Too, in the Mafia is a 1974 Danish comedy film directed by Henning Ørnbak and starring Dirch Passer.

In this 91-minute film, con man "Viffer" (played by Passer) is now stuck working with the mafia. But when the mob boss wants him to marry his daughter, he runs off, taking along the money from a heist.

== Cast ==
- Dirch Passer – Victor 'Viffer' Hansen
- Freddy Albeck – Don Luigi
- Jytte Abildstrøm – Donna Elvira
- Dick Kaysø – Dino
- Per Goldschmidt – Carlo
- Poul Glargaard – Emilio Costello
- Preben Kaas – Valde Sørensen
- Axel Strøbye – Olfert
- Lone Hertz – Dafne
- Preben Mahrt – Sheik Abdul
- Henrik Wiehe – Abduls tolk
- Bertel Lauring – Julius / 'Sildehajen'
- Jens Østerholm – Eddy 'Trigger' Brown
- Finn Nielsen – Kenneth
- Vera Gebuhr – Danselærerinde
- Lene Maimu – Sygeplejerske
- Claus Nissen – Benny
- Lise Henningsen – Mafia pige
- Hans Christian Ægidius – Læge på skadestue
- Ulf Pilgaard – Overlæge Gudmund Brikse
