= Oh, to Be on the Bandwagon! =

1972 film

- Poster featuring Karl Stegger
- Directed by: Henning Carlsen
- Written by: Henning Carlsen; Benny Andersen
- Produced by: Henning Carlsen
- Starring: Karl Stegger
- Cinematography: Henning Kristiansen
- Edited by: Henning Carlsen
- Release date: 13 September 1972
- Running time: 93 minutes
- Country: Denmark
- Language: Danish

Oh, to Be on the Bandwagon! (Danish: Man sku være noget ved musikken) is a 1972 Danish drama film directed by Henning Carlsen. It was entered in the 22nd Berlin International Film Festival. The film was selected as the Danish entry for the Best Foreign Language Film at the 45th Academy Awards, but was not accepted as a nominee. For her role as Elly, Lone Lindorff won the Bodil Award for Best Actress in a Supporting Role.

== Cast ==
- Karl Stegger – Søren
- Birgitte Bruun – Caja (as Birgitte Price)
- Otto Brandenburg – Lasse
- Jesper Langberg – Svend
- Ingolf David – Ib
- Lone Lindorff – Elly
- Gyrd Løfquist – Café owner
- Lene Maimu – Annie
- Lene Vedsegård – Ragnhild
- Ellen Margrethe Stein – Ib's mother
- Birgit Conradi – Lone, the wife of Lasse
- Hans W. Petersen – Mr Hansen
- Ebba Amfeldt – Old lady
- Elin Reimer – Gerda, the wife of Søren
- Martin Lichtenber – Jens, the son of Søren and Gerda

== See also ==
- List of submissions to the 44th Academy Awards for Best Foreign Language Film
- List of Danish submissions for the Academy Award for Best Foreign Language Film
