= Bjørn Puggaard-Müller =

Danish actor (1922–1989)

- Born: 13 March 1922; Gentofte, Denmark
- Died: 13 May 1989 (aged 67); Denmark
- Occupation: Actor
- Years active: 1945–1988

Bjørn Puggaard-Müller (13 March 1922 – 13 May 1989) was a Danish film actor. He appeared in more than 90 films between 1945 and 1988. He was born in Gentofte, Denmark and died in Denmark.

== Filmography ==
- Panik i familien - 1945
- Sikken en nat - 1947
- Dorte - 1951
- To minutter for sent - 1952
- Kongeligt besøg - 1954
- I kongens klær - 1954
- Kristiane af Marstal - 1956
- Natlogi betalt - 1957
- Sønnen fra Amerika - 1957
- Tre piger fra Jylland - 1957
- Det lille hotel - 1958
- Pigen og vandpytten - 1958
- Pigen i søgelyset - 1959
- Soldaterkammerater rykker ud - 1959
- Vi er allesammen tossede - 1959
- Skibet er ladet med - 1960
- Baronessen fra benzintanken - 1960
- Eventyr på Mallorca - 1961
- Gøngehøvdingen - 1961
- Støv på hjernen - 1961
- Den grønne elevator - 1961
- Prinsesse for en dag - 1962
- Soldaterkammerater på sjov - 1962
- Han, hun, Dirch og Dario - 1962
- Frøken April - 1963
- Vi har det jo dejligt - 1963
- Når enden er go' - 1964
- Alt for kvinden - 1964
- Slottet - 1964
- Næsbygaards arving - 1965
- Een pige og 39 sømænd - 1965
- En ven i bolignøden - 1965
- Min søsters børn - 1966
- Dyden går amok - 1966
- Flagermusen - 1966
- Gys og gæve tanter - 1966
- Utro - 1966
- Soyas tagsten - 1967
- Jeg - en marki - 1967
- Det er ikke appelsiner - det er heste - 1967
- Smukke Arne og Rosa - 1967
- Min kones ferie - 1967
- Min søsters børn på bryllupsrejse - 1967
- Martha - 1967
- Far laver sovsen - 1967
- I den grønne skov - 1968
- Jeg elsker blåt - 1968
- Jeg - en kvinde 2 - 1968
- Min søsters børn vælter byen - 1968
- Olsen-banden - 1968
- Stormvarsel - 1968
- Det var en lørdag aften - 1968
- Mig og min lillebror og storsmuglerne - 1968
- Der kom en soldat - 1969
- Himmel og helvete - 1969
- Olsen-banden på spanden - 1969
- Sonja - 16 år - 1969
- Ta' lidt solskin - 1969
- Nøglen til Paradis - 1970
- Hurra for de blå husarer - 1970
- Rend mig i revolutionen - 1970
- Christa - 1970
- Ballade på Christianshavn - 1971
- Tandlæge på sengekanten - 1971
- Den forsvundne fuldmægtig - 1971
- Rektor på sengekanten - 1972
- Motorvej på sengekanten - 1972
- På'en igen Amalie - 1973
- Romantik på sengekanten - 1973
- I Jomfruens tegn - 1973
- Familien Gyldenkål - 1975
- Julefrokosten - 1976
- Sømænd på sengekanten - 1976
- Hopla på sengekanten - 1976
- Affæren i Mølleby - 1976
- Spøgelsestoget - 1976
- Pas på ryggen, professor - 1977
- Skytten - 1977
- Fængslende feriedage - 1978
- Firmaskovturen - 1978
- Olsen-banden går i krig - 1978
- Det parallelle lig - 1982
- Kurt og Valde - 1983
- Mord i Paradis - 1988
