= Sigrid Lütken =

Danish sculptor (1915–2008)

Sigrid Helga Lütken (1915–2008) was a Danish sculptor who is remembered for her works in public spaces throughout Denmark. Working in a wide variety of materials, she focused on plants, animals and people, all depicted in strong abstract forms. Her works form part of the permanent exhibitions of the National Museum of Denmark and can be seen in the Museum of Aabenraa and in Hjørring's Sculpture Park. Some of her more recent creations decorate the garden of the Carlsberg Foundation in Copenhagen.

== Biography ==
Born on 30 November 1915 in Helsingør, Sigrid Helga Lütken was the daughter of Major General Louis Carl Frederik Lütken (1863–1918) and Gertrud Thürmer. From 1936 to 1941, she studied sculpture at the Royal Danish Academy of Fine Arts under Einar Utzon-Frank.

Her early works follow naturalistic trends, depicting human figures and animals which are frequently in motion. Her later works are increasingly abstract, covering fruits, plants or birds in an ornamental style with simple cubic shapes. Her materials include granite, cast iron, stoneware and bronze.

From 1954, Lütken exhibited with the Grønningen artists and from 1965 with the group known as Koloristerne. From the 1980s, as a member of the selection committee, she participated in the exhibitions at Vrå Hojskole. Her last exhibitions were in early 2008 at Den Frie Udstilling and in Hobro together with works by her husband, the sculptor Bent Sørensen (1923–2008). In 1972 she was awarded the Eckersberg Medal and in 1994 the lifelong award from the Danish Arts Foundation.

Sigrid Lütken died on 2 March 2008 and is buried in the Lundtofte Churchyard.
