= Flagermusen =

1966 film

- Directed by: Annelise Meineche
- Written by: John Hilbard; Volmer Sørensen
- Starring: Poul Reichhardt; Lily Broberg; Ghita Nørby
- Cinematography: Ole Lytken
- Edited by: Lizzi Weischenfeldt
- Release date: 1 August 1966
- Running time: 96 minutes
- Country: Denmark
- Language: Danish

Flagermusen is a 1966 Danish film directed by Annelise Meineche and starring Poul Reichhardt. It is based on the operetta Die Fledermaus by Johann Strauss II.

== Cast ==
In alphabetical order

- Annette Blichmann - Felicita, dancer and friend of Ida
- Lily Broberg - Rosalinde
- Poul Bundgaard
- Dario Campeotto
- Paul Hagen - Frosch
- Holger Juul Hansen - Dr. Falke
- Susanne Heinrich - Dancer and friend of Ida
- Knud Hilding
- Niels Hinrichsen
- Valsø Holm
- Arthur Jensen
- Dida Kronenberg - Dancer and friend of Ida
- Grethe Mogensen - Prince Orloffsky
- Henry Nielsen
- Ghita Nørby - Kammerpige Adele
- Bjørn Puggaard-Müller
- Poul Reichhardt - Von Eisenstein
- Birgit Sadolin - Ida, Adeles Søster
- Ove Sprogøe - Advokat
- Karl Stegger - Fængelsdirektør
- Jeanette Swensson - Dancer and friend of Ida
- Olaf Ussing
