= Tough Guys of the Prairie =

1970 film

- Film poster
- Directed by: Carl Ottosen
- Written by: Carl Ottosen
- Produced by: Henrik Sandberg
- Starring: Dirch Passer
- Cinematography: Claus Loof
- Edited by: Edith Nisted Nielsen
- Music by: Sven Gyldmark
- Release date: 31 August 1970
- Running time: 99 minutes
- Country: Denmark
- Language: Danish

Tough Guys of the Prairie (Danish: Præriens skrappe drenge) is a 1970 Danish comedy film written and directed by Carl Ottosen and starring Dirch Passer.

== Cast ==
- Dirch Passer as Jonathan Ignasius Salvatore 'Biggy' Jones
- Paul Hagen as Shorty
- Preben Kaas as Ben
- Willy Rathnov as Sam
- Karl Stegger as Hank Ericson
- Jesper Klein as Art Ericson
- Sisse Reingaard as Katy Ericson
- Miskow Makwarth as Johnson
- Lone Lau as Kari Johnson
- Eva Danné as Sally
- Ove Sprogøe as Judge
- Lars Lunøe as Slim O'Hara
- Hans-Henrik Krause as Gus
- Peer Guldbrandsen as Tucky
- Benny Hansen as Brooke
- Carl Ottosen as Sheriff
- Poul Glargaard as Deputy
- Arne Møller as Bartender
- Bjørn Spiro as Indian Chief
