= Amour (1970 film) =

1970 film by Gabriel Axel

- US film poster
- Directed by: Gabriel Axel
- Written by: Gabriel Axel
- Produced by: Gabriel Axel; Henrik Sandberg
- Cinematography: Rolf Rønne
- Edited by: Edith Nisted Nielsen; Lizzi Weischenfeldt
- Music by: Bertrand Bech
- Release date: 7 August 1970
- Running time: 94 minutes
- Countries: Denmark; France
- Language: Danish

Amour (also known as Ways of Women) is a 1970 Danish drama film directed by Gabriel Axel.

== Plot ==
The 94-minute movie contains three episodes. In part one, the year is 1200 and a young woman is married to an older, unkind man. Part two takes place in 1910 and the final part in the 1840s.

== Cast ==
1st episode, c. 1200

- Svend Johansen (actor) - Diderik
- Tine Bjerregaard – Gundelil
- Ole Guldbrandsen - Kjartan
- Helmer Johansen – Ebbesen
- André Sallyman – 1. karl
- Berd Jönsson – 2. karl

2nd episode, c. 1910

- Ghita Nørby – Elisa
- Jacques Mauclair – Elisas mand
- Ejnar Hans Jensen - Elisas elsker
- Kim Meyer – Sønnen
- Kirsten Lyngholm – Datteren
- Paul Hüttel – 1. tyv
- Eddie Karnil - 2. tyv
- Hans W. Petersen – Frisørmesteren
- Karl Stegger – Konditoren
- Dirch Passer – Gas- og vandmesteren
- Lone Helmer - Hans kone
- Jesper Langberg – Kulmanden
- Addy Lund - Kulmandens kone
- Ove Sprogøe – Gammel, døv dame
- Svend Erik Jensen – Politimesteren
- Carl Ottosen – Betjent
- Preben Nicolaisen – Betjent
- Gerd Vindahl – Betjent
- Ib Sørensen – Betjent
- Morten Grunwald – Brandmajoren
- Paul Hagen – Brandmand
- Klaus Pagh – Brandmand
- Kurt Andersen – Brandmand
- Svend Krogh – Brandmand

3rd episode, c. 1840

- Nadine Alari – Constance Vernon
- Bernard Noël – Adolphe Vernon
- Philippe Étesse - Philippe Despres
- Paule Emanuele - Constances veninde
- Jacques François Zeller – Venindens mand
- Monique Mauclair – Venindens datter
- Philippe Baron – Venindens søn
- Robert Burnier – En gammel herre
- Lucienne Givry – En gammel dame
- Paul Mercey - Kusken
- Karine Jeantet – Tjenestepigen
