= Miss April =

Miss April, also known as Frøken April, can refer to:

== Films ==
- Miss April (1958 film), a 1958 Swedish film
- Miss April (1963 film), a 1963 Danish film

== People ==
- April Jeanette Mendez (born 1987), American professional wrestler also known by the ring name Miss April

== Music ==
- "Miss April", song by Chantal Kreviazuk from What If It All Means Something, 2002
