= Passer passer piger =

1965 film

- Directed by: Sven Methling
- Written by: Bent From; Ida From
- Produced by: Ditte Restorff
- Starring: Helle Virkner
- Cinematography: Aage Wiltrup
- Edited by: Maj Soya; Lizzi Weischenfeldt
- Music by: Sven Gyldmark
- Production company: Saga Studios
- Release date: 23 July 1965
- Running time: 83 minutes
- Country: Denmark
- Language: Danish

Passer passer piger is a 1965 Danish comedy film directed by Sven Methling, written by Ida and Bent From and starring Helle Virkner. It is the fourth and final film in Saga Studio's popular “Støv” (Danish for “dust”) series, with its Danish premiere on 23 July 1965.

== Cast ==
- Helle Virkner as Fru Henriksen
- Poul Reichhardt as Hr. Henriksen
- Jan Priiskorn-Schmidt as Peter
- Dirch Passer as Alf Thomsen
- Hanne Borchsenius as Frk. Monalisa Jacobsen
- Sigrid Horne-Rasmussen as Fru Hansen
- Ove Sprogøe as Thorbjørn Hansen
- Caja Heimann as Fru Feddersen
- Karl Stegger as Hr. Feddersen
- Beatrice Palner as Fru Svendsen
- Henning Palner as Hr. Svendsen
- Paul Hagen as Sælger
- Carl Ottosen as Brandmajoren
- Kirsten Passer as Bogsælger
- Aino Korwa as Miss Harboøre
- Karin Grubert as Miss Nørrebro
- Marianne Jørgensen as Miss Lolland
- Dianna Vangsaa as Miss Sengeløse
- Marianne Tholsted as Miss Taasinge
- Jeanne von d'Ahe as Miss Vojens
- Bertel Lauring as Billetkontrollør
