= Girls at Arms 2 =

1976 film

- Film poster
- Directed by: Finn Henriksen
- Written by: Peer Guldbrandsen; Finn Henriksen
- Produced by: Henrik Sandberg
- Starring: Berrit Kvorning
- Cinematography: Erik Wittrup Willumsen
- Edited by: Lizzi Weischenfeldt
- Release date: 11 October 1976
- Running time: 101 minutes
- Country: Denmark
- Language: Danish

Girls at Arms 2 (Danish: Piger i trøjen 2) is a 1976 Danish comedy film directed by Finn Henriksen and starring Berrit Kvorning and Dirch Passer. It is a sequel to the 1975 film Girls at Arms.

== Cast ==
- Berrit Kvorning as Premierløjtnant Merete Clausen
- Klaus Pagh as Hermann Clausen
- as Vasby
- Karl Stegger as Major Basse
- Helle Merete Sørensen as Vibsen
- Ulla Jessen as Magda
- Magi Stocking as Børgesen
- Marianne Tønsberg as Irmgard Martinsen
- Birger Jensen as Frits
- Søren Strømberg as Otto
- Lille Palle as Orgeltramper
- Finn Nielsen as Oversergent Brysk
- Lotte Tarp as Journalisten Kirsten
- Lise Schrøder as Journalist
- Olaf Ussing as Forsvarsministeren
