= Der var engang =

1966 film

- Directed by: John Price
- Written by: Holger Drachmann; John Price
- Produced by: Henrik Sandberg
- Starring: Birgitte Bruun
- Cinematography: Henning Kristiansen
- Edited by: Edith Nisted Nielsen
- Release date: 1 October 1966
- Running time: 103 minutes
- Country: Denmark
- Language: Danish

Der var engang (transl. Once upon a time) is a 1966 Danish family film directed by John Price and starring Birgitte Bruun.

== Cast ==
- Birgitte Bruun as Prinsessen af Illyrien
- Hans W. Petersen as Kongen af Illyrien
- Peter Steen as Prinsen af Danmark
- Ove Sprogøe as Første frier
- Gunnar Lauring as Anden frier
- Preben Lerdorff Rye as Første junker
- Hardy Rafn as Anden junker
- Vigga Bro as Sisse, køkkenpige
- Kai Holm as Kulsvier
- Gerda Madsen as Kvinde på markedsplads
- Edouard Mielche as Ceremonimester
- Henry Nielsen as Gøgler
- Dirch Passer as Kasper Røghat
- Sisse Reingaard as Hofdame
- Grethe Sønck as Fadebursterne
- Volmer Sørensen as Kok
- Cleo Jensen as Kokkepige
- Ulrik Neumann as Banjospiller
