= Virtue Runs Wild =

- Poster by Aage Lundvald
- Dyden går amok
- Directed by: Sven Methling
- Written by: Sven Methling
- Produced by: Ditte Restorff
- Starring: John Hahn-Petersen; Birgitte Federspiel; Axel Strøbye; Louis Miehe-Renard
- Cinematography: Aage Wiltrup
- Edited by: Maj Soya
- Music by: Sven Gyldmark
- Distributed by: Saga Studio
- Release date: 25 March 1966
- Running time: 106 minutes
- Country: Denmark
- Language: Danish

Virtue Runs Wild (Danish: Dyden går amok) is a Danish 1966 erotic comedy film. Based on the eponymous 1957 novel by Knud Poulsen, the film was written and directed by Sven Methling. The film was shot in 1965 in the North Jutland town of Stenbjerg; it is called "Hu" in the film.

== Cast ==
- John Hahn-Petersen – Edward
- Birgitte Federspiel – Ina (Edward's wife)
- Axel Strøbye – N.O.
- Louis Miehe-Renard – Joachim
- Bodil Steen – Andrea (Joachim's wife)
- Hanne Løye – Anna (waitress)
- Morten Grunwald – Niels (fisherman)
- Birgit Sadolin – Bertha (Niels' wife)
- Carl Ottosen – Monni (fisherman)
- Lise Thomsen – Elly (Monni's wife)
- Arthur Jensen – Ivar (fisherman)
- Lily Broberg – Mille (Ivar's wife)
- Peter Kitter – Marinus (fisherman)
- Gunnar Lemvigh – Police Constable Dørup
- Gabriel Axel – Minister Deje
- Ole Monty – Train Station Headmaster
- Holger Vistisen
- Bjørn Puggaard-Müller – School Headmaster
