= Otto Brandenburg =

Danish musician

- Born: 4 September 1934; Hejnsvig, Denmark
- Died: 1 March 2007 (aged 72); Copenhagen, Denmark
- Other name: Ole Brandenburg
- Years active: 1953–2000

Otto Herman Max Brandenburg (4 September 1934 – 1 March 2007) was a Danish musician, singer and actor. He is often credited as Denmark's first Rock and roll singer and was considered a teen idol in the 1950s and 60s.

Brandenburg released music and performed as an actor in Denmark, Sweden, and Germany. Some of his records in Germany were released under the pseudonym Ole Brandenburg. Over the course of his career, he performed in around 60 films and series.

== Career ==
=== Music ===
Brandenburg learned to play the violin at an early age and played in the Danish Youth Symphony Orchestra. He eventually left the orchestra to focus on singing and learning the guitar.

Brandenburg briefly performed with Ib Glindemann's swing orchestra before forming the vocal quartet Four Jacks between 1955 and 1956, alongside Poul Rudi, John Mogensen and Bent Werther. In 1958, Brandenburg left the group to pursue a solo career producing Danish rock. Initially, his style borrowed heavily from Elvis Presley's softer material and his debut as a solo artist, "I believe", has been compared to Elvis' gospel-inspired songs. Brandenburg's style later evolved into a mixture of pop, folk, and jazz music.

Brandenburg's popularity greatly expanded in the late 1950s and early 1960s, particularly following his hit "What do you want to make those eyes at me for". At its peak, he reportedly received 500 letters from fans per week. In 1960, he unsuccessfully competed in the Dansk Melodi Grand Prix with the song "To Lys På Et Bord" (English: two lights on one board). Despite the song's lack of success at the Eurovision Song Contest, it became one of Brandenburg's biggest commercial hits, selling over 200,000 copies. He again competed in the 1961 Dansk Melodi Grand Prix with "Godnat lille du". Brandenburg also found success in Sweden, competing in the 1962 Melodifestivalen, performing with Hans Wahlgren's orchestra, and performing in Stockholm as a jazz musician.

He sang the theme song for the 1962 film Journey to the Seventh Planet. In 1969, Brandenburg composed and sang the Christmas song "Søren Banjomus". The song has become a Christmas classic in Denmark; between 1995 and 2004 it was the most played Christmas song by the Danish Broadcasting Corporation. In the 1970s he often worked with actress Vivi Bak. In the 1980s he collaborated with songwriters Halfdan Rasmussen and Evert Taube.

=== Film ===
Brandenburg won a Bodil award in 1978 for his role in the film Hør, var der ikke en som lo? and again in 1982 for Gummi Tarzan. Brandenburg sang "You've Got a Friend in Me" in the Danish dub of Toy Story. His last job in film was voicing the character Hanbjørnen in the animated movie Drengen der ville gøre det umulige, which released in 2002.

== Personal life ==
Brandenburg was born in Hejnsvig on 4 September 1934. As an infant, his mother and he moved to Copenhagen. He grew up with his mother and stepfather in Nørrebro, where he attended Stevsgades Skole. After leaving school, he apprenticed as a machinist at the Vølund machine factory. In 1953, he became the Copenhagen light welterweight boxing champion.

On 8 June 1960, Otto Brandenburg married Birthe Kildehus Jørdgensen in Lyngby Church, with whom he had a daughter, Stine, in December of that year. The couple separated in 1966. In 1971 he became engaged to interior designer Susanne Tuxen, though the pair never wed. In the 1980s he had brief relationships with Italian actress Franca Maria De Monti and Bente Pryds, an employee of Nordisk Film. From the late 1980s he lived with Hanne Mynster, a former TV producer with whom he lived the last years of his life in relative seclusion in Buddinge. He died on 1 March 2007 following a long period of illness.

== Filmography ==
- Styrmand Karlsen (1958)
- Sømand i knibe (1960)
- Mine tossede drenge (1961)
- Prinsesse for en dag (1962)
- Don Olsen kommer til byen (1964)
- Den gale dansker (1969)
- Guld til præriens skrappe drenge (1971)
- Bennys badekar (1971)
- Tandlæge på sengekanten (1971)
- Revolutionen i vandkanten (1971)
- Med kærlig hilsen (1971)
- Mor, jeg har patienter (1972)
- Man sku' være noget ved musikken (1972)
- Lenin, din gavtyv (1972)
- Mig og Mafiaen (1973)
- I tyrens tegn (1974)
- Prins Piwi (1974)
- Bejleren – en jysk røverhistorie (1975)
- Familien Gyldenkål (1975)
- Piger i trøjen (1975)
- Blind makker (1976)
- Spøgelsestoget (1976)
- Sømænd på sengekanten (1976)
- Hopla på sengekanten (1976)
- Strømer (1976)
- Julefrokosten (1976)
- Hærværk (1977)
- Familien Gyldenkål vinder valget (1977)
- Pas på ryggen, professor (1977)
- Hør, var der ikke en som lo? (1978)
- Mig og Charly (1978)
- The Thralls (1978)
- Trællenes oprør (1979)
- Krigernes børn (1979)
- Next Stop Paradise (1980)
- Langturschauffør (1981)
- Har du set Alice? (1981)
- Gummi Tarzan (1981)
- Thorvald og Linda (1982)
- Kidnapning (1982)
- Tre engle og fem løver (1982)
- Ballerup Boulevard (1986)
- Skyggen af Emma (1988)
- Kærlighed uden stop (1989)
- Sort høst (1993)
- Riget I (1994)
- Riget II (1997)
- Forbudt for børn (1998)
- Du Skal Bruge Dit Liv (1999)
- Dykkerne (2000)
- Prop og Berta (2000)
- Max (2000)

== Discography ==
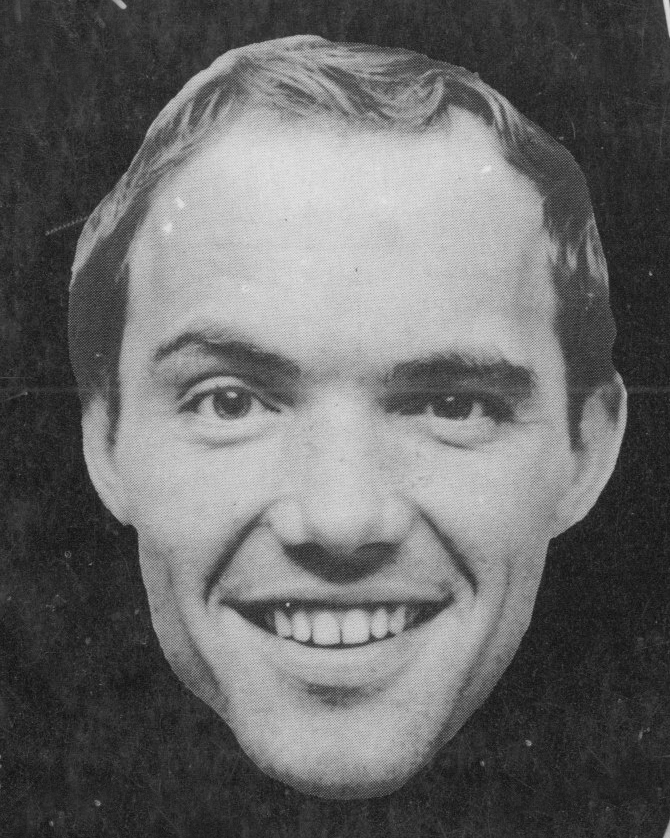
Close-up of Brandenburg from the album art of his 1962 EP: Anne-Li / Lolo-Lolita

=== Albums and LPs ===
- Otto (LP, 1960)
- This is Otto Brandenburg (Album, 1960)
- Valmuevejen (Album with Anders Koppel, 1975)
- Noget om... af Halfdan Rasmussen (Album, 1976)
- Børnenes Sange 1 (LP, 1980)
- Vores gade (LP with Vivi Bak, 1980)
- Har havet nogensinde glitret sådan? (Album, 1982)
- Hvordan kan du være så erotisk! – Otto Brandeburg synger Jens August Schade (Album, 1984)
- Godnat til Store og Små (Album, 1986)
- Det' her det sner (Album, 1987)
- Otto Brandenburg (Album, 1989)
