= Cirkusrevyen 67 =

- Directed by: Preben Kaas
- Written by: Preben Kaas; Poul Sabroe
- Produced by: Poul Sabroe; Henrik Sandberg
- Starring: Dirch Passer, Daimi, Lily Broberg, Jytte Abildstrøm
- Cinematography: Claus Loof, Henning Kristiansen, Frank Paulsen, Peter Klitgaard
- Music by: Jørn Grauengaard, Sven Gyldmark, Kjeld Bonfils
- Release date: 22 September 1967
- Running time: 82 minutes
- Country: Denmark
- Language: Danish

Cirkusrevyen 67 is a 1967 Danish movie directed by Preben Kaas, scripted by Preben Kaas and Poul Sabroe and starring Dirch Passer, Daimi Gentle, Lily Broberg and Jytte Abildstrøm.

== Plot ==
The movie is a film version of Cirkusrevyen from 1967. The main feature was the song "Hvem har du kysset i din gadedør?" performed by Dirch Passer and Daimi, and they are the ones depicted on the movie poster.

== Cast (selected) ==
- Dirch Passer
- Daimi Gentle
- Lily Broberg
- Jytte Abildstrøm
- Preben Kaas
- Ole Søltoft
