= The Missing Clerk =

1971 film

- Film poster
- Directed by: Gert Fredholm
- Written by: Hans Scherfig; Erik Thygesen
- Produced by: Erik Crone; Svend Hansen
- Starring: Ove Sprogøe
- Cinematography: Henning Kristiansen
- Edited by: Lars Brydesen
- Release date: 29 October 1971
- Running time: 102 minutes
- Country: Denmark
- Language: Danish

The Missing Clerk (Danish: Den forsvundne fuldmægtig) is a 1971 Danish comedy film directed by Gert Fredholm. It was entered into the 22nd Berlin International Film Festival.

== Cast ==
- Ove Sprogøe as Teodor Amsted
- Bodil Kjer as Mrs. Amsted
- Karl Stegger as Martin Hageholm
- Poul Thomsen as Jens Jensen
- Preben Ravn as Politiassistent Munk
- Hans-Henrik Krause as Politikommisær Skovstrup
- Valsø Holm as Kontorchef
- Mime Fønss as Fru Møller
- Jytte Abildstrøm as Frk. Liljenfeldt
- Vera Gebuhr as Fru Mörtel
- Holger Perfort as Fuldmægtig Degerstrøm
- Ulla Koppel as Servitricen Ulla (as Ulla Lemvigh-Müller)
- Lone Lindorff as Karen
- Ole Varde Lassen as Forsvarer
- Elin Reimer as Johanne

== See also ==
- List of submissions to the 44th Academy Awards for Best Foreign Language Film
- List of Danish submissions for the Academy Award for Best Foreign Language Film
