= Soldaterkammerater rykker ud =

1959 film

- Directed by: Sven Methling
- Written by: Bob Ramsing
- Produced by: Henrik Sandberg
- Starring: Louis Miehe-Renard
- Cinematography: Aage Wiltrup
- Edited by: Edith Schlüssel
- Release date: 9 October 1959
- Running time: 100 minutes
- Country: Denmark
- Language: Danish

Soldaterkammerater rykker ud (English: Fellow soldiers on the move) is a 1959 Danish comedy film directed by Sven Methling and starring Louis Miehe-Renard.

== Cast ==
- Louis Miehe-Renard – Knud Petersen (616)
- Ebbe Langberg – Peter 'Ras' Rasmussen (613)
- Paul Hagen – Henrik Didriksen (617)
- Preben Kaas – Ole Sørensen (615)
- Klaus Pagh – Holger Schwanenkopf (614)
- Ole Dixon – Bolleå (612)
- Svend Johansen – Viggo Clausen (611)
- Carl Ottosen – 1st Sergeant Vældegaard (Lillebror)
- Vera Stricker – Nora Didriksen
- Annie Birgit Garde – Karen
- Vivi Bach – Inger (as Vivi Bak)
- Mimi Heinrich – Mette
- Dirch Passer – Guard og Conferencier
- Kjeld Petersen – The Military Doctor
- Bjørn Puggaard-Müller – Captain Berg
