= Lene Tiemroth =

Danish actress (1943–2016)

Lene Tiemroth (16 July 1943 – 3 November 2016) was a Danish actress.

== Background and career ==
Tiemroth was born in Copenhagen, Denmark, the daughter of actors Edvin Tiemroth and Clara Østø. She graduated from the Royal Danish Theatre's Student School in 1966. She then briefly affiliated with the Det Ny Teater before she traveled to the United States to try her luck, though this primarily came to consist of various recordings of drama schools. At a young age, she was a child actor along with Kjeld Nørgaard.

She has performed in many venues, including Gladsaxe Teater, Det Danske Teater, and Husets Teater. Among the many plays she has appeared include Hedda Gabler, Electra, Cabaret, Macbeth, Uncle Vanya, Threepenny Opera, Faderen and Glasmenageriet. For several years she taught at the Danish National School of Theatre and Contemporary Dance and has been an assistant director on television.

On television, she was a part of En by i provinsen and Rejseholdet.

In 2001, she received a Bodil Award for Best Actress in a Supporting Role for her involvement in Italian for Beginners. She died on 3 November 2016 at the age of 73.

== Filmography ==
Film excerpts:

- Pigen og greven – 1966
- Det var en lørdag aften – 1968
- Forræderne – 1983
- Hip Hip Hurrah! – 1987
- Italian for Beginners – 2000
- Den gode strømer – 2004
- Afgrunden – 2004
