= Gold for the Tough Guys of the Prairie =

1971 film

- Directed by: Finn Karlsson
- Written by: Finn Karlsson; Carl Ottosen
- Produced by: Henrik Sandberg
- Starring: Dirch Passer
- Cinematography: Claus Loof
- Edited by: Anker Sørensen
- Music by: Sven Gyldmark
- Distributed by: Dansk-Svensk Film
- Release date: 30 August 1971
- Running time: 107 minutes
- Country: Denmark
- Language: Danish

Gold for the Tough Guys of the Prairie (Danish: Guld til præriens skrappe drenge) is a 1971 Danish comedy film directed by Finn Karlsson and starring Dirch Passer and Willy Rathnov.

== Cast ==
- Dirch Passer - Biggy
- Willy Rathnov - Sam
- Paul Hagen - Shorty
- Preben Kaas - Ben
- Judy Gringer - Swingdoor-Susie
- Lykke Nielsen - Shannahoo
- Preben Mahrt - Old Jeff
- Carl Ottosen - The Sheriff of Greenville
- Jesper Klein - Telegraph Manager
- Jørgen Kiil - The Sheriff of Cornerstone
- Lars Lunøe - Slim O'Hara
- Otto Brandenburg - Cowboy
- Jens Jørgen Thorsen - Cowboy
- Poul Glargaard - Cowboy
- René de Fries - Cowboy
- Reginald Samsø - Cowboy
- Dale Robinson - Cowboy
- Sven Cleemann - Cowboy
- Susanne Breuning - Girl
- Kirsten Sloth - Jenny
- Kurt Andersen - Linedancer
- John Mogensen - Saloonpianist
