= Per Pallesen =

Danish actor (born 1942)

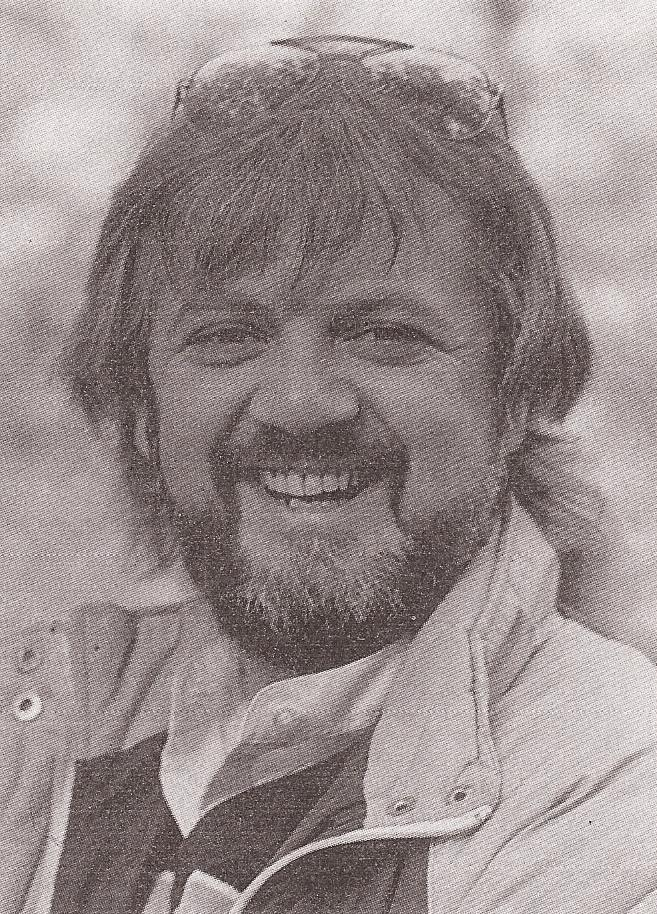
- Born: 30 April 1942 (age 84); Aars, Denmark
- Occupation: Actor
- Years active: 1967-present
- Children: Trine Pallesen

Per Pallesen (born 30 April 1942) is a Danish actor. He has appeared in more than 35 films since 1967.

== Selected filmography ==
- Onkel Joakims hemmelighed (1967)
- Girls at Arms (1975)
- Girls at Sea (1977)
