= Three Girls in Paris =

1963 film by Gabriel Axel

- Poster by Aage Lundvald
- Directed by: Gabriel Axel
- Written by: Félicien Marceau; Arvid Müller
- Produced by: Paul Lemaire
- Starring: Daniel Gélin
- Cinematography: Arne Abrahamsen; Jørgen Skov
- Edited by: Birger Lind
- Music by: Bent Fabricius-Bjerre
- Distributed by: Nordisk Film
- Release date: 14 October 1963
- Running time: 105 minutes
- Country: Denmark
- Language: Danish

Three Girls in Paris (Danish: Tre piger i Paris) is a 1963 Danish family film directed by Gabriel Axel and starring Daniel Gélin. It is based on a short story by Félicien Marceau.

== Plot ==
Three Danish girls (Ghita Nørby, Susse Wold and Hanne Borchsenius) travel to Paris. After leaving their luggage and money at a hotel, they tour the city, but forget the name and location of the hotel. They are helped by a Parisian taxi driver, and meet a series of typical French people.

== Cast ==
- Daniel Gélin as Raymond
- Ghita Nørby as Hanne
- Susse Wold as Lotte
- Hanne Borchsenius as Dorte
- Dirch Passer as Kok Harald Mikkelsen
- Paul Hagen as Frederik
- Erling Schroeder as Mand på dansk konsulat i Paris
- Gabriel Axel as Fransklærer
- Jacques Mauclair as Overbetjenten
- Noël Roquevert as Mr. Maurice
- Jackie Sardou
- Serge Sauvion
- Dominique Davray
- Colette Régis
