= Finn Henriksen =

Danish film director

- Born: 29 January 1933; Randers, Denmark
- Died: 6 December 2008 (aged 75); Lyngby, Denmark
- Occupations: Film director Screenwriter
- Years active: 1960–1989

Finn Henriksen (29 January 1933 – 6 December 2008) was a Danish film director and screenwriter. He directed 17 films and wrote for 19 between 1960 and 1989. He was born in Randers, Denmark and died in Lyngby, Denmark. He is buried at Lundtofte Cemetery.

== Filmography ==
- Jydekompagniet 3 (1989)
- Jydekompagniet (1988)
- Fængslende feriedage (1978)
- Piger til søs (1977)
- Julefrokosten (1976)
- Piger i trøjen 2 (1976)
- Piger i trøjen (1975)
- Pigen og drømmeslottet (1974)
- Helle for Lykke (1969)
- Far laver sovsen (1967)
- Pigen og greven (1966)
- Flådens friske fyre (1965)
- Norden i flammer (1965)
- Bussen (1963)
- Frøken April (1963)
- Prinsesse for en dag (1962)
- Forelsket i København (1960)
