= Dirch Passer =

Danish actor and comedian (1926–1980)

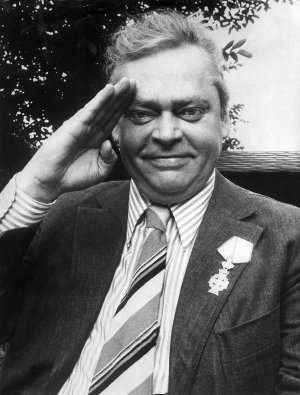
- Dirch Passer (1974)
- Born: Dirch Hartvig Passer; 18 May 1926; Østerbro, Copenhagen, Denmark
- Died: 3 September 1980 (aged 54); Copenhagen, Denmark
- Occupations: Actor, comedian
- Years active: 1947–1980
- Spouse(s): Hanne Bjerre, Sigrid Horne-Rasmussen
- Partner(s): Judy Gringer, Bente Askjær
- Children: 2

Dirch Hartvig Passer (18 May 1926 – 3 September 1980) was a Danish actor and comedian. He was renowned for his improvisational skills and, with a filmography comprising 90 films, one of Denmark's most prolific actors. His life is depicted in the Danish semi-biographical film A Funny Man (2011; Danish title: Dirch) directed by Martin Zandvliet and starring Nikolaj Lie Kaas as Dirch Passer.

== Life ==
When he was young, Passer was very shy, but had an ambition to become an actor. Instead, he conformed to his father's wishes by attending the J. Lauritzen sea training school near Svendborg in 1944. But since he had persistent problems with seasickness, he later attended the drama school De frederiksbergske teatres Elevskole.

During the 1950s he formed a duo with his friend and fellow actor Kjeld Petersen. Their revue sketches, based upon the contrast between Petersen's mixture of joviality and desperate anger and Passer's deadpan responses, are still considered classics by the public. The sudden death of Kjeld Petersen in 1962 led Passer to avoid revues for five years, but he built up an individual reputation and in 1967 he returned to the revue gaining new victories. Many thin jokes in the scripts were greatly improved by his performance. In particular, his many amiable eccentrics and "nature experts" together with his sketch roles as a baby and as a nonsense "Russian"-speaking clown made him famous. From his later years must be mentioned an almost silent sketch in which he portrays a man's vain attempt to stop smoking (also shown in West German TV). It was told that he could speak any language, however he wouldn't understand any of it, which was one of his good qualities.

In his life, Dirch Passer wanted to play more serious roles instead of remaining in comedy. However, his image as a comedian was so solid that his attempt to break into serious acting proved to be unsuccessful.

== Career ==
He was often referred to as a loud actor in spite of the fact that under-acting was responsible for much of his force. A Danish critic, Jens Kistrup, once said that one of the secrets behind the comedy of Passer was its combination of elements that are normally regarded as incompatible. He possessed noisiness and discretion, loudness and quietness, boundlessness and complete control, craziness and softness – all this combined with a special intimacy with the audience. Among the inspirations he mentioned Joe E. Brown but he was also known for his admiration of the British comedian Tommy Cooper. In his films, which were of very mixed quality, he often played kind and somewhat crazy "Everymen" or antiheroes. Among his best movie roles were stage roles transferred to film; here must be mentioned the hero in Charley's Aunt (1959), Celestin-Floridor in Frøken Nitouche (1963) and Leopold in Summer in Tyrol (1964, based on The White Horse Inn).

Dirch Passer (right) with composer Aage Stentoft

Numerous Danish actors see him as a role model. In day-to-day life he was quite shy in behaviour, somewhat the opposite of his theatrical appearances.

== Death ==
On 3 September 1980, Passer collapsed from cardiac arrest behind the stage curtain, in his clown costume, just before the opening number of the annual Tivoli Revue at the Glass Hall in Tivoli Gardens. An hour or two later, the doctors at the hospital declared him dead. Passer is buried in the church cemetery in Dragør, Denmark.

== Selected filmography ==
- Sikken en nat (1947) – Publikum (uncredited)
- Stjerneskud (1947) – Hendes hårdtslående ven
- Lykke på rejsen (1947) – Statist
- Den opvakte jomfru (1950) – Sømand i 1520
- Som sendt fra himlen (1951) – Soldat
- Dorte (1951) – Amerikaner
- Vi arme syndere (1952) – Værtshusgæst
- Vejrhanen (1952) – Ekspeditionssekretær i Kirkeministeriet
- Rekrut 67, Petersen (1952) – Lillebilchauffør Larsen
- Drömsemester (1952) – Mogens Jensen
- Solstik (1953) – Politimanden
- Ved kongelunden... (1953) – Konduktør Svendsen
- Sju svarta be-hå (1954) – Jens Nielsen
- I kongens klæ'r (1954) – Søren Rask – rekrut 66
- Sol, sommer og badevand (1954)
- Far och flyg (1955) – Peder
- Det var paa Rundetaarn (1955) – Hans Ramløse, musiker
- Hvad vil De ha'? (1956) – Jansen
- Den store gavtyv (1956) – K.M.M. Mathisen
- Færgekroen (1956) – Erik Hansen
- Tag til marked i Fjordby (1957) – 'Lange' Emil Andersen
- Dirch & Kjeld hos C. & G. (1957, Short)
- Krudt og klunker (1958) – Fotograf
- Styrmand Karlsen (1958) – Valdemar Bøgelund
- Pigen og vandpytten (1958) – Fabrikant Munk
- Møde ved midnat (1958, TV Short) – Mr. Fox
- Dirch & Kjeld blir nye mennesker (1958, Short)
- Poeten og Lillemor (1959) – Bageren
- Onkel Bill fra New York (1959) – Hans Høj
- Soldaterkammerater rykker ud (1959) – Vagtsoldat
- Charles' tante (1959) – Grev Ditlev Lensby
- Vi er allesammen tossede (1959) – Sporvognskonduktør Knudsen
- TV te' vands (1959, TV Movie) – Chef
- Poeten og Lillemor og Lotte (1960) – The baker
- Elefanter på loftet (1960) – Dennis
- Baronessen fra benzintanken (1960) – Hans Høy
- Sømand i knibe (1960) – Freddy
- Summer and Sinners (1960) – Kansas Joe
- Skibet er ladet med (1960) – Guvernør Alfond d. 1 / Alfond d. 2
- Panik i paradis (1960) – Greven
- Forelsket i København (1960) – Kunstmaler Kobolski
- Reptilicus (1961) – Petersen
- Peters baby (1961) – William Thorsen
- Poeten og Lillemor i forårshumør (1961) – Bageren
- Støv på hjernen (1961) – Alf Thomsen
- Gøngehøvdingen (1961) – Ib
- Lykkens musikanter (1962) – Elevatorfører Gogol
- Han, Hun, Dirch og Dario (1962) – Eigil Hansen
- Det tossede paradis (1962) – Angelus Bukke
- Sømænd og svigermødre (1962) – Kanusti Mogensen
- Filmdesorientering (1962, Short)
- Det støver stadig (1962) – Alf Thomsen
- Oskar (1962) – Martin Kristiansen
- Svinedrengen og prinsessen på ærten (1962) – (voice)
- Venus fra Vestø (1962) – Ditlev Egede-Schack
- Pigen og pressefotografen (1963) – Bastian
- Vi har det jo dejligt (1963) – Thorvald Madsen
- Hvis lille pige er du? (1963) – Hans
- Frøken Nitouche (1963) – Floridor / Celestin
- Bussen (1963) – Buschauffør Martin
- Tre piger i Paris (1963) – Kok Harald Mikkelsen
- Støv for alle pengene (1963) – Alf Thomsen
- Majorens oppasser (1964) – Thomas Edison Hansen
- Sommer i Tyrol (1964) – Leopold Ulrik Joackim Brantmeyer
- Blåjackor (1964) – Sam
- Don Olsen kommer til byen (1964) – Thorsen
- Här kommer bärsärkarna (1965) – Garm
- Passer passer piger (1965) – Alf Thomsen
- Flådens friske fyre (1965) – Valdemar Jensen
- Pigen og millionæren (1965) – Jens Møller
- Jag – en älskare (1966) – Mortensen
- Der var engang (1966) – Kasper Røghat
- Slap af, Frede! (1966) – Fettucino
- Pigen og greven (1966) – Andreas Lillelys
- Copenhagen Design (1967, TV Movie)
- Elsk... din næste! (1967) – Olaf
- Cirkusrevyen 67 (1967)
- Onkel Joakims hemmelighed (1967) – Fyrst Fingernem (uncredited)
- Mig og min lillebror (1967) – Søren Severinsen
- Soldaterkammerater på bjørnetjeneste (1968) – Vagtkommandør 419 (uncredited)
- Mig og min lillebror og storsmuglerne (1968) – Søren Severinsen
- Min søsters børn vælter byen (1968) – Dr. Mogensen
- Dyrlægens plejebørn (1968) – Dyrlæge Linsager
- Musikken var af Kai Normann Andersen (1968, TV Movie)
- Sjov i gaden (1969) – Peter Jensen
- Pigen fra Egborg (1969) – John Søgaard
- Mig og min lillebror og Bølle (1969) – Søren Severinsen
- Kyrkoherden (1970) – Bartolomeus
- Amour (1970) – Blikkenslager
- Nøglen til paradis (1970) – Gudmund (præst og rejsearrangør)
- Præriens skrappe drenge (1970) – Biggy
- Hurra for de blå husarer (1970) – Spjellerup
- Den Gyldenblonde fortæller (1970, TV Movie)
- Hvor er liget, Møller? (1971) – Vilhelm Hårlung
- Guld til præriens skrappe drenge (1971) – Biggy
- Min søsters børn, når de er værst (1971) – Viggo
- Takt og tone i himmelsengen (1972) – Grev Axel von Hasteen
- Lenin, din gavtyv (1972) – General Ludendorff
- Solstik på badehotellet (1973) – Doktor Grå
- Mig og mafiaen (1973) – Victor 'Viffer' Hansen
- Mafiaen – det er osse mig! (1974) – Victor 'Viffer' Hansen
- Dirch (1974, TV Movie) – Himself / Babyen
- Piger i trøjen (1975) – Oversergent Vasby
- Spøgelsestoget (1976) – Theodor 'Teddy' T. Thönder
- Piger i trøjen 2 (1976) – Oversergent Vasby
- Alt på et bræt (1977) – Alfred Emanuelsen
- Piger til søs (1977) – Seniorsergent Vasby
- Fængslende feriedage (1978) – Fængselsinspektør Frost

== See also ==
Dannebrogordenens Hæderstegn
