= Jessie Rindom =

Danish actress (1903–1981)

- Born: 4 October 1903; Rostock, Germany
- Died: 8 January 1981 (aged 77); Copenhagen, Denmark
- Other name: Jessie Lauring
- Occupation: Actress
- Years active: 1925–1980

Jessie Rindom (4 October 1903 – 8 January 1981) was a Danish film actress. She appeared in 30 films between 1925 and 1980. Born in Rostock, Germany, she was the daughter of Danish actors Ellen Diedrich and Svend Rindom. She died in Copenhagen, Denmark.

== Filmography ==
- Undskyld vi er her (1980)
- Next Stop Paradise (1980)
- Attentat (1980)
- Julefrokosten (1976)
- Sådan er de alle (1968)
- Onkel Joakims hemmelighed (1967)
- Historien om Barbara (1967)
- En nat i august (1967)
- Pigen og millionæren (1965)
- Ih, du forbarmende (1965)
- Når enden er go' (1964)
- Sikke'n familie (1963)
- Frøken April (1963)
- Venus fra Vestø (1962)
- Den rige enke (1962)
- Sømænd og svigermødre (1962)
- Eventyrrejsen (1960)
- Vi er allesammen tossede (1959)
- Verdens rigeste pige (1958)
- Ingen tid til kærtegn (1957)
- Den kloge mand (1956)
- Kispus (1956)
- Hvad vil De ha'? (1956)
- Jan går til filmen (1954)
- Solstik (1953)
- Hr. Petit (1948)
- Soldaten og Jenny (1947)
- Panik i familien (1945)
- Damen med de lyse Handsker (1942)
- Takt, tone og tosser (1925)
