= Sunstroke (1953 film) =

1953 film

- Directed by: Astrid Henning-Jensen; Bjarne Henning-Jensen
- Written by: Astrid Henning-Jensen; Bjarne Henning-Jensen; Preben Neergaard
- Produced by: Henning Karmark; Aage Stentoft
- Starring: Kjeld Petersen
- Cinematography: Rudolf Frederiksen
- Release date: 9 March 1953
- Running time: 89 minutes
- Country: Denmark
- Language: Danish

Sunstroke (Danish: Solstik) is a 1953 Danish comedy film directed by Astrid and Bjarne Henning-Jensen.

== Cast ==
- Kjeld Petersen as Portieren
- Birgitte Reimer as Frk. Vibeke Søgaard
- Preben Neergaard as Teddy / Theodor Winther
- Ole Monty as Overlæge Grå
- Helle Virkner as Mona Miller
- Lise Ringheim as Eva Linde
- Jessie Rindom as Frk. Suhr
- Dirch Passer as Politimanden
