= Those Blasted Kids =

1947 film

- Directed by: Astrid Henning-Jensen; Bjarne Henning-Jensen
- Written by: Fleming Lynge
- Produced by: Fleming Lynge
- Production company: Nordisk Film Company
- Release date: August 18, 1947 (Denmark)
- Running time: 110 minutes
- Country: Denmark
- Language: Danish

Those Blasted Kids or Those damned kids (Danish: De pokkers unger) is a 1947 Danish film based on a play of the same name by Estrid Ott. It was directed by Astrid Henning-Jensen, Bjarne Henning-Jensen and was produced by Fleming Lynge.

== Cast ==
- Henry Nielsen
- Tove Maës
- Sigrid Horne-Rasmussen
- Preben Neergaard
- Knud Heglund
- Jakob Nielsen
- Preben Kaas
- Carl Ottosen
- Per Buckhøj
- Bodil Lindorff
- Valsø Holm
- Ebbe Langberg
- Ole Petersson
- Christian Eriksen
