= Preben Mahrt =

Danish actor (1920–1989)

- Born: 28 July 1920; Hellebæk, Denmark
- Died: 19 December 1989 (aged 69)
- Occupation: Actor
- Years active: 1941–1976

Preben Mahrt (28 July 1920 – 19 December 1989) was a Danish film actor born in Hellebæk, Denmark. He appeared in 68 films between 1941 and 1976.

== Filmography ==
- Tante Cramers testamente − 1941
- Regnen holdt op − 1942
- Når bønder elsker − 1942
- Ta' briller på − 1942
- Lise kommer til byen − 1947
- Hatten er sat − 1947
- I de lyse nætter − 1948
- Hvor er far? − 1948
- Det gælder os alle − 1949
- Op og ned langs kysten − 1950
- Lynfotografen − 1950
- Min kone er uskyldig − 1950
- Din fortid er glemt − 1950
- Hold fingrene fra mor − 1951
- Vores fjerde far − 1951
- Tre finder en kro − 1955
- Den store gavtyv − 1956
- Hvad vil De ha'? − 1956
- Hidden Fear − 1957
- Natlogi betalt − 1957
- Lån mig din kone − 1957
- Amor i telefonen − 1957
- Skarpe skud i Nyhavn − 1957
- Mor skal giftes − 1958
- Pigen og vandpytten − 1958
- Kærlighedens melodi − 1959
- Far til fire på Bornholm − 1959
- Helle for Helene − 1959
- Tre må man være − 1959
- Vi er allesammen tossede − 1959
- Kvindelist og kærlighed − 1960
- Eventyrrejsen − 1960
- Forelsket i København − 1960
- Den hvide hingst − 1961
- Rikki og mændene − 1962
- Slottet − 1964
- Mord for åbent tæppe − 1964
- Don Olsen kommer til byen − 1964
- Pigen og millionæren − 1965
- Jeg − en kvinde − 1965
- Jensen længe leve − 1965
- Flådens friske fyre − 1965
- Pigen og greven − 1966
- Slap af, Frede − 1966
- Soyas tagsten − 1966
- Nyhavns glade gutter − 1967
- Elsk din næste − 1967
- Mig og min lillebror og Bølle − 1969
- Nøglen til Paradis − 1970
- Guld til præriens skrappe drenge − 1971
- I morgen, min elskede − 1971
- Min søsters børn når de er værst − 1971
- Nu går den på Dagmar − 1972
- I Tyrens tegn − 1974
- Mafiaen, det er osse mig − 1974
- Overklassens hemmelige sexglæder − 1974
- I Tvillingernes tegn − 1975
- Brand−Børge rykker ud − 1976
- Spøgelsestoget − 1976
