= Miss April (1963 film) =

- Directed by: Finn Henriksen
- Written by: Ib Henrik Cavling; Finn Henriksen; Erik Pouplier
- Produced by: Erik Overbye
- Starring: Malene Schwartz
- Cinematography: Henning Bendtsen
- Edited by: Lars Brydesen
- Release date: 2 August 1963
- Running time: 95 minutes
- Country: Denmark
- Language: Danish

Miss April (Danish: Frøken April) is a 1963 Danish family film directed by Finn Henriksen and starring Malene Schwartz.

== Cast ==
- Malene Schwartz as Frk. April Bergen
- Ove Sprogøe as Lægeforsker Vagn Jochumsen
- Poul Reichhardt as Dr. Gert Stiger
- Lily Broberg as Sygeplejerske Inge Behrens
- Hans W. Petersen as Konsul Gorm Andersen
- Jessie Rindom as Erna Bergen
- Bodil Udsen as Fru Rasmussen
- Karl Stegger as Chauffør Poul Nielsen
- Knud Hallest as Dahl
- Inge Ketti as Frk. Børgesen
- Arthur Jensen as Fiskehandler
- Helle Hertz as Fabrikant Kronager
- Valsø Holm as Godsejer Kransby
- Bjørn Puggaard-Müller as Lord Edward Hopebatten
- Bent Mejding as Dr. Ioskue
- Bent Thalmay as Dr. Madsen
- Alexander Notara as Giniescu
- Lili Heglund
