= The Key to Paradise =

1970 film

- Directed by: Sven Methling
- Written by: Aage Stentoft
- Produced by: Ole Mølgaard
- Starring: Dirch Passer
- Cinematography: Claus Loof
- Edited by: Lizzi Weischenfeldt
- Distributed by: ASA Film
- Release date: 24 August 1970
- Running time: 76 minutes
- Country: Denmark
- Language: Danish

The Key to Paradise (Danish: Nøglen til Paradis) is a 1970 Danish family film directed by Sven Methling and starring Dirch Passer.

In this rather short film (76 minutes), an untraditional parish priest runs a travel agency. Also a chance to look back at the early days of charter tourism in the 1960s and 70s.

== Cast ==
- Dirch Passer - Gudmund (priest and travel agent)
- Lone Hertz - Gabriella 'Gaby' Secretary to St. Peter
- Jørgen Ryg - Portier
- Else-Marie Juul Hansen - Permanent Secretary Agnes Kirkegård
- Preben Mahrt - Menighedsrådsformand
- Vera Gebuhr - Marie
- Jørgen Kiil - Young man getting married
- Sisse Reingaard - Young woman getting married
- Arne Møller - Drunk man
- Emil Hass Christensen - Finance minister
- Bjørn Puggaard-Müller - Church minister
- Carl Ottosen - Christian IV
- Suzanne Bech - The maid
- Jørgen Buckhøj - The pilot
- Ib Makwarth - Photographer
- John Larsen - The Doctor
- Lone Lindorff - The fitness trainer
