= Lise Ringheim =

Danish actress (1926–1994)

- Born: 15 May 1926; Frederiksberg, Denmark
- Died: 25 September 1994 (aged 68); Denmark
- Occupation: Actress
- Years active: 1943-1993

Lise Ringheim (15 May 1926 – 25 September 1994) was a Danish film actress. She appeared in 37 films between 1943 and 1993. She was born in Frederiksberg, Denmark and died in Denmark.

== Selected filmography ==
- Vi arme syndere (1952)
- We Who Go the Kitchen Route (1953)
- Sunstroke (1953)
- The Last Winter (1960)
- Harry and the Butler (1961)
- Svinedrengen og prinsessen på ærten (1962)
- Den kære familie (1962)
- Dreaming of Rita (1993)
