= Ebba Amfeldt =

Danish actress (1906–1974)

- Born: 21 December 1906; Copenhagen, Denmark
- Died: 1 June 1974 (aged 67); Frederiksberg, Denmark
- Occupation: Actress
- Years active: 1946–1973

Ebba Amfeldt (21 December 1906 – 1 June 1974) was a Danish film actress. She appeared in 29 films between 1946 and 1973.

== Filmography ==
- Mig og mafiaen (1973)
- På'en igen, Amalie (1973)
- Man sku være noget ved musikken (1972)
- Hovedjægerne (1971)
- Til lykke Hansen (1971)
- Olsen-banden (1968)
- Farvel Thomas (1968)
- Hold da helt ferie (1965)
- En ven i bolignøden (1965)
- Don Olsen kommer til byen (1964)
- Premiere i helvede (1964)
- Døden kommer til middag (1964)
- Støv for alle pengene (1963)
- Skyggen af en helt (1963)
- Vi har det jo dejligt (1963)
- Støvsugerbanden (1963)
- Der brænder en ild (1962)
- Drømmen om det hvide slot (1962)
- Det støver stadig (1962)
- Landsbylægen (1961)
- Eventyr på Mallorca (1961)
- Eventyrrejsen (1960)
- Frihedens pris (1960)
- Paw (1959)
- Over alle grænser (1958)
- Mod og mandshjerte (1955)
- Vores lille by (1954)
- Sukceskomponisten (1954)
- Jeg elsker en anden (1946)
