= Forelsket i København =

1960 film

- Directed by: Finn Henriksen
- Written by: Henning Bahs; Finn Henriksen
- Produced by: Erik Balling
- Starring: Siw Malmkvist
- Cinematography: Poul Pedersen
- Edited by: Birger Lind
- Music by: Bent Fabric (music); Sejr Volmer-Sørensen (lyrics)
- Distributed by: Nordisk Film
- Release date: 4 November 1960
- Running time: 98 minutes
- Country: Denmark
- Languages: Danish; Swedish

Forelsket i København is a 1960 Danish romance film directed by Finn Henriksen and starring Siw Malmkvist, Henning Moritzen and Ove Sprogøe.

== Cast ==
- Siw Malmkvist as Maj Lindquist
- Henning Moritzen as Jan Scharf
- Ove Sprogøe as Carni
- Jørgen Ryg as Dingo
- Perry Knudsen as Stump
- Dirch Passer as Kunstmaler Kobolski
- Preben Mahrt as Teaterchef Steiner
- Mimi Heinrich as Marlene Steiner
- Håkan Westergren as Majoren
- Sif Ruud as Majorskan
- Keld Markuslund - Viceværten
- Jakob Nielsen as Kaptajn
- Ove Rud
- Bjørn Spiro as Dirigent
- Valsø Holm as Værtshusholder
- Knud Schrøder as Værtshusholder
- Christian Brochorst as Cafe-ejer
- Carl Ottosen as Brandmand
- Thecla Boesen as Påklæderske
- Jytte Abildstrøm as Teatergæst
- Else Leach
- Poul Thomsen as Matros
- Gitte Wagner
- Henry Lohmann as Falckredder
