= Ole Monty =

Danish actor (1908–1977)

- Born: 22 October 1908; Copenhagen, Denmark
- Died: 24 April 1977 (aged 68); Denmark
- Occupation: Actor
- Years active: 1937–1976

Ole Monty (22 October 1908 – 24 April 1977) was a Danish film actor. He appeared in 65 films between 1937 and 1976.

He was born in Copenhagen, Denmark and died in Denmark.

== Filmography ==
- Flådens blå matroser – 1937
- Under byens tage – 1938
- Den usynlige hær – 1945
- Så mødes vi hos Tove – 1946
- Bag de røde porte – 1951
- Fodboldpræsten – 1951
- Vejrhanen – 1952
- Solstik – 1953
- I kongens klær – 1954
- Det var på Rundetårn – 1955
- Hvad vil De ha'? – 1956
- Taxa K-1640 Efterlyses – 1956
- Den store gavtyv – 1956
- Vi som går stjernevejen – 1956
- Lån mig din kone – 1957
- Natlogi betalt – 1957
- Andre folks børn – 1958
- Vagabonderne på Bakkegården – 1958
- Krudt og klunker – 1958
- Vi er allesammen tossede – 1959
- Sømand i knibe – 1960
- Frihedens pris – 1960
- Gøngehøvdingen – 1961
- Sorte Shara – 1961
- Soldaterkammerater på sjov – 1962
- Bussen – 1963
- Majorens oppasser – 1964
- Slottet – 1964
- Sommer i Tyrol – 1964
- Don Olsen kommer til byen – 1964
- Sytten – 1965
- En ven i bolignøden – 1965
- Mor bag rattet – 1965
- Næsbygaards arving – 1965
- Krybskytterne på Næsbygaard – 1966
- Dyden går amok – 1966
- Jeg er sgu min egen – 1967
- Lille mand, pas på! – 1968
- Soldaterkammerater på bjørnetjeneste – 1968
- Min søsters børn vælter byen – 1968
- Olsen Banden – 1968
- Midt i en jazztid – 1969
- Ta' lidt solskin – 1969
- Sonja – 16 år – 1969
- Mordskab – 1969
- Rend mig i revolutionen – 1970
- Motorvej på sengekanten – 1972
- Romantik på sengekanten – 1973
- På'en igen Amalie – 1973
- Mig og Mafiaen – 1973
- I Tyrens tegn – 1974
- Pigen og drømmeslottet – 1974
- Piger i trøjen – 1975
- Spøgelsestoget – 1976
- Familien Gyldenkål sprænger banken – 1976
