= Next Stop Paradise (1980 film) =

Næste Stop Paradis
- Poster
- Directed by: Jon Bang Carlsen
- Written by: Jon Bang Carlsen
- Produced by: Jørgen Schmidt Nicolaisen, Gunnar Obel
- Starring: Karen Lykkehus; Preben Lerdorff Rye
- Cinematography: Alexander Gruszynski
- Edited by: Kasper Schyberg
- Music by: Gunner Møller Pedersen
- Release date: 17 November 1980
- Running time: 91 minutes
- Country: Denmark
- Language: Danish language

Næste Stop Paradis or Next Stop Paradise is a 1980 Danish romantic drama film directed and written by Jon Bang Carlsen. The film stars Karen Lykkehus.

== Cast ==
- Karen Lykkehus as Dagmar Larsen
- Preben Lerdorff Rye as Hjalmar Krog
- Suzette Kempf as Dagmar som ung
- Jessie Rindom as Ellen
- Knud Lang as Ejnar Thomsen
- Ole Larsen as Frederiksen
- Ingolf David as Cirkusdirektør
- Inger Stender as Oversygeplejerske
- Peter Boesen as Dagmars afdøde mand - Togfører Kurt Larsen
- Otto Brandenburg as Dagmars søn John
- Kirsten Hansen-Møller as Johns kone
- Pouel Kern as Mand på kirkegård
- Valdemar Brodthagen as Baden
- Rene van Erp as Martin
- Bent Samuelsen as Dværgen Orlando
- Erik Louring as Døvstum
- Egon Aagaard as Harmonikaspiller
- Hilma Egeskov
- Helmut Friis
- Henning Hansen as Sanger
- Muzaffer Yildirim as Buschauffør
- Hilda Olsen
- Eva Hodell
