= Going for Broke (1977 film) =

1977 film by Gabriel Axel

- Directed by: Gabriel Axel
- Written by: Ole Boje
- Produced by: Henrik Sandberg
- Starring: Preben Kaas
- Cinematography: Rolf Rønne
- Edited by: Finn Henriksen
- Music by: Jørn Grauengaard
- Release date: 18 February 1977
- Running time: 85 minutes
- Country: Denmark
- Language: Danish

Going for Broke (Danish: Alt på et bræt) is a 1977 Danish comedy film directed by Gabriel Axel and starring Preben Kaas and Dirch Passer.

When three out of work actors break into a bank through the toilet of a railroad station comedy ensues.

== Cast ==
- Preben Kaas - Arthur Gabrielsen
- Dirch Passer - Alfred Emanuelsen
- Jørgen Ryg - Hugo
- Lily Broberg - Fru Svendsen
- Peter Steen - Betjenten
- Elin Reimer - Emma
- Johannes Marott - Johannes
- Birger Jensen - Hr. Hoppe
- Ghita Nørby - Skuespilleren
- Henning Rohde - Portner
- Berrit Kvorning - Tullepigen
- Torben Jetsmark - Nullermanden
- Søren Rode - Betjent
- Torben Jensen - Skorstensfejeren
- Gabriel Axel - Fransktalende mand
- Rumle Hammerich - Mand der læser på toilettet
- Søren Strømberg - Mand der ikke vil betale for toiletbesøget
- Holger Vistisen - Mand der får maling i hovedet
- Esper Hagen - Mand der sidder fast i fiskesnøre
- Tommy Kenter - TV-reporter
