= Girls at Sea (1977 film) =

1977 film

- Directed by: Finn Henriksen
- Written by: Finn Henriksen
- Produced by: Lars Kolvig
- Starring: Helle Merete Sørensen
- Cinematography: Erik Wittrup Willumsen
- Edited by: Jens Grønborg
- Release date: 16 September 1977
- Running time: 100 minutes
- Country: Denmark
- Language: Danish

Girls at Sea (Danish: Piger til søs) is a 1977 Danish comedy film directed by Finn Henriksen and starring Helle Merete Sørensen, Ulla Jessen and Marianne Tønsberg.

Women have joined the Danish military but still cannot do active duty in the Navy. Three women's unofficial visit on a Navy ship complicates things due to an unannounced exercise at sea. Trying to hide the trio leads to comical situations.

== Cast ==
- Helle Merete Sørensen as Constable Vibeke 'Vibsen' Margrethe Nielsen
- Ulla Jessen as Constable Magda Gammelgaard
- Marianne Tønsberg as Constable Irmgard Mathisen
- Karl Stegger as Ship Commander
- Henning Jensen as Deputy Commander Juhl
- Finn Nielsen as Lieutenant Harry Hansen
- Ole Søltoft as Sailor Pamper
- Søren Strømberg as Sailor Otto Harboe
- Lille Palle as Sailor Palle
- Torben Jensen as Sailor Panama
- Lars Høy as Sailor Fritz
- Torben Jetsmark as Sailor Vaskebjørn
- Dirch Passer as Senior Sergeant Vasby
- Pierre Miehe-Renard as Mass Gast
- Cæsar as Sparks
- Claus Nissen as Banjemester
- Per Pallesen as Sergeant 'Mugge' Martinsen
- Allan Larsen as Sailor
- Jan Hovgaard as Sailor (as Jan Hougaard)
- Jens Brenaa as Sailor
- Kjeld Nørgaard as Lieutenant Captain
- Arthur Jensen as Investigator
