= Svinedrengen og prinsessen på ærten =

1962 film

- Directed by: Poul Ilsøe
- Written by: Hans Christian Andersen; Poul Ilsøe
- Produced by: Finn Aabye; Henning Karmark
- Starring: Dirch Passer
- Edited by: Maj Soya
- Release date: 23 November 1962
- Running time: 49 minutes
- Country: Denmark
- Language: Danish

Svinedrengen og prinsessen på ærten (literally The Swineherd and the Princess on the Pea) is a 1962 Danish animated film directed by Poul Ilsøe and starring Dirch Passer. It is based, respectively, on the Hans Christian Andersen tales The Swineherd and "The Princess and the Pea.

== Cast ==
- Dirch Passer as voice
- Henning Moritzen as voice
- Lise Ringheim as voice
- Johannes Meyer as voice
- Bjørn Spiro as voice
- Knud Hilding as voice
- Ellen Margrethe Stein as voice
