= Jørgen Kiil =

Danish actor (1931–2003)

Jørgen Kiil (Jørgen Peter Christiansen Kiil; 13 February 1931 – June 1, 2003) was a Danish actor who appeared in more than fifty films between 1961 and 2003.

== Selected filmography ==
Film
Year	Title	Role	Notes
2002	Minor Mishaps		
1998	Skyggen		
1978	In My Life		
1976	Strømer		
1973	Me and the Mafia		
1971	Gold for the Tough Guys of the Prairie		
1971	My Sisters Children Go Astray		
1970	Hooray for the Blue Hussars		
1970	The Key to Paradise		
1970	Tintomara		
1965	Sytten		
1963	Dronningens vagtmester		
