= Bjørn Spiro =

Danish actor (1909–1999)

- Born: 20 March 1909; Frederiksberg, Denmark
- Died: 1 June 1999 (aged 90); Denmark
- Occupation: Actor
- Years active: 1914-1972

Bjørn Spiro (20 March 1909 – 1 June 1999) was a Danish film actor. He appeared in 60 films between 1914 and 1972.

== Filmography ==
- Det hemmelighedsfulde X (1914)
- 5 raske piger (1933)
- Der var engang en Vicevært (1937)
- Skilsmissens børn (1939)
- Damen med de lyse Handsker (1942)
- Kriminalassistent Bloch (1943)
- De røde enge (1945)
- Op med lille Martha (1946)
- Lyn-fotografen (1950)
- Mød mig paa Cassiopeia (1951)
- Kongeligt besøg (1954)
- Jan går til filmen (1954)
- Escape from Terror (1955)
- Mod og mandshjerte (1955)
- Far til fire i byen (1956)
- Natlogi betalt (1957)
- Laan mig din kone (1957)
- Skovridergaarden (1957)
- Pigen og vandpytten (1958)
- Poeten og Lillemor (1959)
- Helle for Helene (1959)
- Vi er allesammen tossede (1959)
- Telefonen ringer (1960)
- Tro, håb og trolddom (1960)
- Skibet er ladet med (1960)
- Forelsket i København (1960)
- Mine tossede drenge (1961)
- Stöten (1961)
- Cirkus Buster (1961)
- Gøngehøvdingen (1961)
- Svinedrengen og prinsessen på ærten (1962)
- Pigen og pressefotografen (1963)
- Dronningens vagtmester (1963)
- Måske i morgen (1964)
- Majorens oppasser (1964)
- Når enden er go' (1964)
- Tine (1964)
- Sommer i Tyrol (1964)
- Don Olsen kommer til byen (1964)
- En ven i bolignøden (1965)
- Flådens friske fyre (1965)
- Slå først, Frede! (1965)
- Gys og gæve tanter (1966)
- Nu stiger den (1966)
- Slap af, Frede! (1966)
- Pigen og greven (1966)
- Jeg er sgu min egen (1967)
- Min kones ferie (1967)
- Onkel Joakims hemmelighed (1967)
- Mig og min lillebror (1967)
- Uden en trævl (1968)
- Mig og min lillebror og storsmuglerne (1968)
- Olsen-banden (1968)
- Præriens skrappe drenge (1970)
- Svend, Knud og Valdemar (1970)
- Dimensionspigen (1970)
- Slå først Jensen (1971)
- Sejle op ad åen (1972)
- Olsen-bandens store kup (1972)
