= Julefrokosten =

1976 film by Finn Henriksen

Julefrokosten (The Office Party) is a Danish comedy film from 1976 directed and written by Finn Henriksen after a novel by Simon Mikkelstrup.

== Cast ==
- Jesper Langberg as Karlsen
- Lisbet Dahl as Henny
- Dick Kaysø as Søren
- Preben Kaas as Hans Jensen
- Jørgen Ryg as Peter Petit Petersen
- Judy Gringer as Borgunde
- Poul Thomsen as Borgundes husband
- Kirsten Norholt as Merete
- Torben Jensen as Thorvald
- Bjørn Puggaard-Müller as Alf Simonsen
- Masja Dessau as Jette
- Birgitte Federspiel as Miss Asmussen
- Tommy Kenter as Marius
- Jessie Rindom as Dame med hund
- Otto Brandenburg as Mand i detentionen
- Miskow Makwarth as Nattevagt
- Finn Henriksen as Taxachauffør
- Jan Hougaard as Taxachauffør
- Torben Zeller as Betjent
- Peter Vincent as Betjent
