= Bertel Lauring =

Danish actor (1928–2000)

- Born: 11 January 1928; Frederiksberg, Denmark
- Died: 28 January 2000 (aged 72); Copenhagen, Denmark
- Occupation: Actor
- Years active: 1953 – 1981

Bertel Lauring (11 January 1928 – 28 January 2000) was a Danish film actor. He appeared in 36 films between 1953 and 1981. He was born in Frederiksberg, Denmark and died in Denmark.

After being a student at Odense Theatre and then having the opportunity to play small roles on several Copenhagen stages, he entered the Royal Theatre's student school in 1952. In the following years he appeared mostly in the capital's theatres, but also spent a number of years at the Aarhus Theatre. Bertel Lauring had several roles in radio and television and managed to record a number of films. He is buried in Bispebjerg Cemetery.

== Filmography ==
- Adam og Eva (1953)
- Natlogi betalt (1957)
- Tro, håb og trolddom (1960)
- Sømand i knibe (1960)
- Herr Korczak og børnene (1960)
- Det skete på Møllegården (1960)
- Soldaterkammerater på efterårsmanøvre (1961)
- Lykkens musikanter (1962)
- Der brænder en ild (1962)
- Premiere i helvede (1964)
- En ven i bolignøden (1965)
- Passer passer piger (1965)
- Jensen længe leve (1965)
- Gys og gæve tanter (1966)
- Krybskytterne på Næsbygård (1966)
- Brødrene på Uglegaarden (1967)
- Jag en kvinna, II - äktenskapet (1968)
- Min søsters børn vælter byen (1968)
- Der kom en soldat (1969)
- Ta' lidt solskin (1969)
- A Day at the Beach (1970)
- Tykke Olsen (1971)
- Hosekræmmeren (1971)
- Laila Løvehjerte (1972)
- Solens børn (1972)
- Olsen-bandens store kup (1972)
- Natten i ventesalen (1974)
- Mafiaen - det er osse mig! (1974)
- Olsen-banden på sporet (1975)
- Familien Gyldenkål (1975)
- Familien Gyldenkål sprænger banken (1976)
- Familien Gyldenkål vinder valget (1977)
- Skytten (1977)
- Firmaskovturen (1978)
- Olsen-banden går i krig (1978)
- Olsen-banden over alle bjerge (1981)
