= Lotte Tarp =

Danish actress (1945–2002)

- Born: 14 February 1945; Århus, Denmark
- Died: 24 October 2002 (aged 57); Copenhagen, Denmark
- Resting place: Cemetery of Holmen
- Occupation: Actress
- Years active: 1962-1990

Lotte Tarp (14 February 1945 – 24 October 2002) was a Danish film actress. She appeared in 27 films between 1962 and 1990. She was born in Århus to the Danish composer, Svend Erik Tarp and died in Copenhagen.

== Partial filmography ==
- Crazy Paradise (1962) - Karen
- Den kære familie (1962)
- Weekend (1962) - Barnepigen Birthe
- Premiere i helvede (1964) - Tove Møller
- Fem mand og Rosa (1964) - Model
- Don Olsen kommer til byen (1964) - Tambourmajor
- Ih, du forbarmende (1965) - Miss 44
- Morianna (1965) - Rita
- En krone på højkant (1966)
- The Reluctant Sadist (1967) - Baroness
- The Jokers (1967) - Inge
- People Meet and Sweet Music Fills the Heart (1967) - Kose
- The Olsen Gang (1968) - Ulla
- De røde heste (1968) - Henriette
- Fun and Games for Everyone (1968)
- Eftermiddagsgæsten (1968)
- The Man Who Thought Life (1969) - Susanne
- Me and My Kid Brother and Doggie (1969) - Fru Bossholm
- Giv Gud en chance om søndagen (1970) - Hanne Riesing
- Farlige kys (1972) - Birthe Kold
- Hjerter er trumf (1976) - Lone Bang
- Girls at Arms 2 (1976) - Journalisten Kirsten
- Kvindesind (1980) - Lene
- Bakom jalusin (1984) - Ellen Joergensen
- A Handful of Time (1989) - Ada
- Piger er en plage! (1990) - Lise Søndergård
