= Poul Thomsen =

Danish actor (1922–1988)

- Born: 15 February 1922; Præstø, Denmark
- Died: 16 December 1988 (aged 66); Denmark
- Occupation: Actor
- Years active: 1944–1985

Johannes Poul Thomsen (15 February 1922 – 16 December 1988) was a Danish theatre, film and voice actor. He was born in Præstø, Denmark and died in Denmark.

== Career ==
Thomsen attended Odense Teater‘s acting school from 1945 to 1947 and gave his stage debut on 22 April 1946. He stayed at Odense until 1949, then went to Aalborg to work as an actor and director at Lille Scenen, and finally moved to Copenhagen in 1957, where he played at several theatres including Fiolteatret and Gladsaxe Teater.

Between 1944 and 1986, Thomsen had about 50 roles in film and television, with the bulk of his appearances in the 1970s. His roles were mainly small, often in comedies including several Olsen Gang films.

Thomsen was also a prolific voice actor in radio plays of Danmarks Radio and a reader of audiobooks.

== Personal life ==
Thomsen was married four times. His first wife was actress Lone Luther from 1947 to 1949. He married actress Kirsten Aller in 1950, and actress Antonie Biering in 1952. His fourth marriage was to Åse Scharling in 1960, with whom he had a daughter and a son.

== Selected filmography ==
- Otte akkorder, 1944
- Lejlighed til leje, 1949
- Vores fjerde far, 1951
- Far til fire, 1953
- Spion 503, 1958
- Styrmand Karlsen, 1958
- Helle for Helene, 1959
- Forelsket i København, 1960
- Skibet er ladet med, 1960
- Komtessen, 1961
- Reptilicus, 1961
- Ullabella, 1961
- Venus fra Vestø, 1962
- Den kære familie, 1962
- Duellen, 1962
- Bussen, 1963
- Majorens oppasser, 1964
- Slap af, Frede, 1966
- Min søsters børn, 1966
- Soyas tagsten, 1966
- Mig og min lillebror, 1967
- Stormvarsel, 1968
- Olsen Banden, 1968
- Kys til højre og venstre, 1969
- Olsen-banden på spanden, 1969
- Rend mig i revolutionen, 1970
- Den forsvundne fuldmægtig, 1971
- Olsen-bandens store kup, 1972
- Præsten i Vejlby (1972), 1972
- Olsen-bandens sidste bedrifter, 1974
- Olsen-banden på sporet, 1975
- Familien Gyldenkål, 1975
- Hjerter er trumf, 1976
- Julefrokosten, 1976
- Familien Gyldenkål sprænger banken, 1976
- Olsen-banden ser rødt, 1976
- Affæren i Mølleby, 1976
- Blind makker, 1976
- Olsen-banden deruda', 1977
- Firmaskovturen, 1978
- Fængslende feriedage, 1978
- Olsen-banden går i krig, 1978
- Trællenes oprør, 1979
- Olsen-banden overgiver sig aldrig, 1979
- Øjeblikket, 1980
- Danmark er lukket, 1980
- Undskyld vi er her, 1980
- Trællenes børn, 1980
- Jeppe på bjerget, 1981
- Kniven i hjertet, 1981
- Olsen-banden over alle bjerge, 1981
- Pengene eller livet, 1982
- Johannes' hemmelighed, 1985
- Når engle elsker, 1985
- Den kroniske uskyld, 1985
