= Lisbet Dahl =

Danish actress (born 1946)

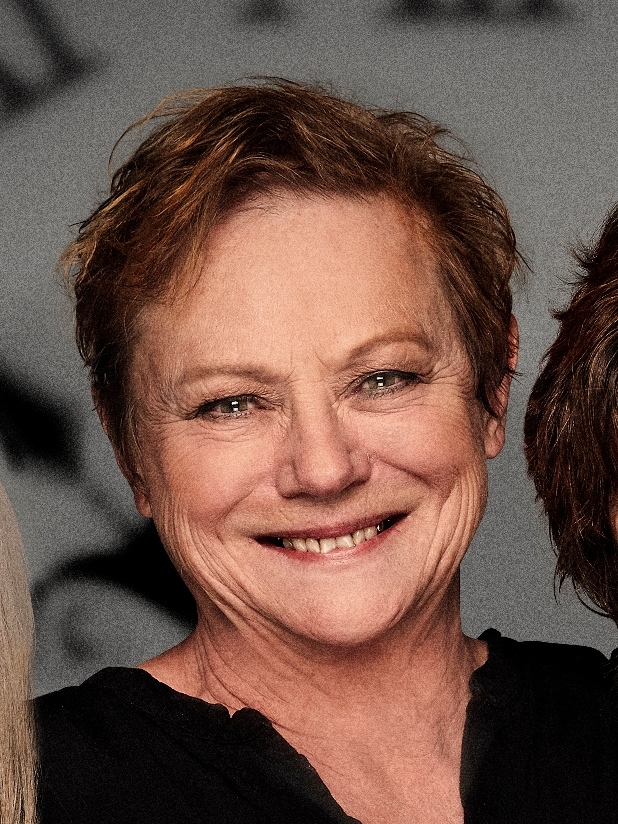
- Born: April 9, 1946 (age 79); Copenhagen, Denmark
- Occupation: Actress

Lisbet Dahl (born 9 April 1946 in Copenhagen is a Danish actress, instructor for the revue Cirkusrevyen. She has appeared in more than 50 Danish movies and TV-shows, and been on Danish TV numerous times. She is also known for playing Revue.

Dahl's various awards include a Danish knighthood and the country's lifetime achievement award for theatre.

== Background ==
Lisbet grew up in a family of actors; her mother is Danish actress Toni Biering and father is the actor Helge Dahl. She was trained to be an actor at Aalborg Teater from 1965 to 1967. She has been married four times and has five children. In an interview, she said "If I could change anything, I would only have had one man. I should never have get divorced."

Dahl's marriages were to Lars Høy (1970-1976), Preben Kaas (1977-1981, his death), Claus Wolter (1987-1992), and Stefan Fønns (1995-2000). She has five children.

She wrote the book At overkomme livet (1999).

Dahl has received various awards and honours, during her career. She was honoured with the Danish order of chivalry, Knight of the Dannebrog, in 2000. Dahl received the Årets Dirch in 1981, a prize given to revue actors. In 2016 she received the lifetime achievement award for Danish theatre, the Reumert Prize of Honour.

She is mentioned in Kraks Blå Bog (Krak's Blue Book), a Danish biographical dictionary service.

== Theatrical career ==
- Cabaret, Aalborg Teater (1969-1970) - Sally Bowles
- Hamlet, Aalborg Teater (1969-1970) - Ofelia
- Milord, Gråbrødrescenen (1981) - Edith Piaf
- Den grønne elevator, ABC Scenen (1986) - Blanny
- Sømænd og svigermor, Privat Teateret (2004-2005)

=== Revue ===
- Rottefælden in Svendborg (1972)
- Cirkusrevyen (1974)
- Tivolirevyen (1998) - Instructor and actor
- Cirkusrevyen (2001 - ) - Instructor and actor

== Selected TV-series ==
- Sommer (The Summers) (2008) - Sofia Sommer
- Bryggeren (1996) - Nathalie Zahle

== Selected filmography ==
- Pigen og drømmeslottet (The Girl and the Dream Castle) (1974) - Tine
- Nøddebo Præstegård (Noedebo vicarage) (1974) - Andrea Margrethe
- Violer er blå (Violets are blue) (1975) - Lise
- Familien Gyldenkål (1975) - Woman working in tax office
- Spøgelsestoget (The ghost train) (1976) - Mrs Else Winther
- Blind makker (Dummy Partner) (1976) - Susanne
- Julefrokosten (The office party) (1976) - Henny
- Firmaskovturen (The Office Picnic) (1978) - Henny
- Fængslende feriedage (Holidays in jail) (1978) - Agnete, Henrys wife
- Forræderne (The traitors) (1983) - Gudrun, Bennedsens wife
- Op på fars hat (Walter and Carlo - up on daddy's hat) (1985) -Vera
- Høfeber (Hayfever) (1991) - Lise
- Sort høst (Black harvest) (1993) - Lig-Johanne
- Nonnebørn (Agnus dei) (1997) - Martha-Louise
- Men & Chicken (Mænd og Høns) (2015) - Susan
