= Paul Hagen =

Danish actor (1920–2003)

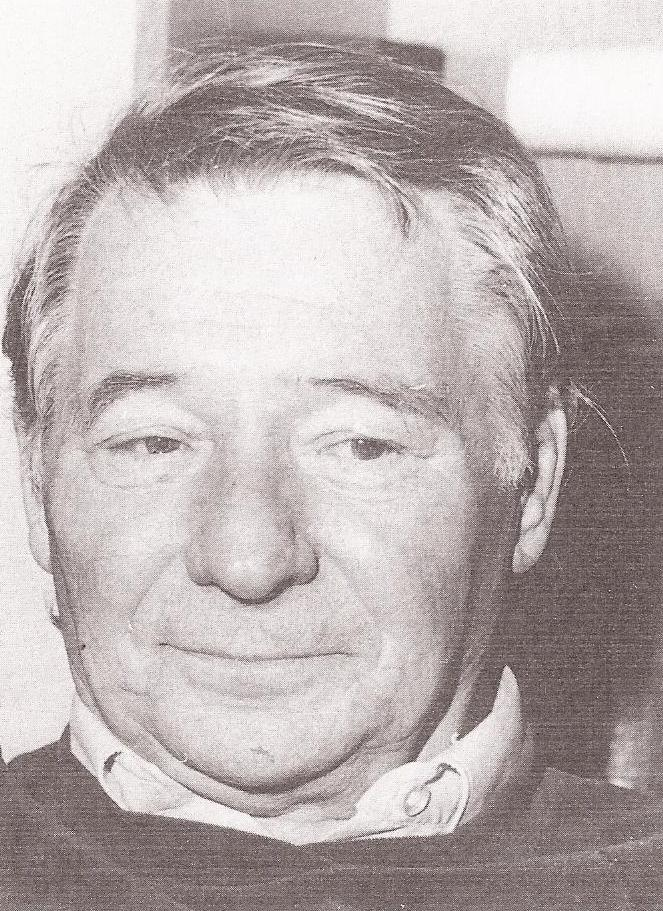
- Born: 19 March 1920; Copenhagen, Denmark
- Died: 19 May 2003 (aged 83); Nakskov, Denmark
- Occupations: Actor, singer
- Years active: 1946–1999

Paul Falck Hagen (19 March 1920 – 19 May 2003) was a Danish film and television actor. He appeared in more than 100 films between 1952 and 1999. He is most known for playing Mr. Clausen in the television series Huset på Christianshavn, which aired between 1970 and 1977.

He was born in Copenhagen, and died in Nakskov, Denmark. He is buried in Langø cemetery on Lolland island where he lived the last years of his life.

== Filmography ==
- Far betaler – 1946
- Avismanden – 1952
- Ta' Pelle med – 1952
- Kærlighedsdoktoren – 1952
- Far til fire – 1953
- Sønnen – 1953
- I kongens klær – 1954
- Sukceskomponisten – 1954
- Jan går til filmen – 1954
- En sømand går i land – 1954
- Arvingen – 1954
- Det var på Rundetårn – 1955
- Hvad vil De ha'? – 1956
- Kristiane af Marstal – 1956
- Taxa K-1640 Efterlyses – 1956
- Tre piger fra Jylland – 1957
- Natlogi betalt – 1957
- Tag til marked i Fjordby – 1957
- Jeg elsker dig – 1957
- Verdens rigeste pige – 1958
- Seksdagesløbet – 1958
- Soldaterkammerater – 1958
- Poeten og Lillemor – 1959
- Soldaterkammerater rykker ud – 1959
- Soldaterkammerater på vagt – 1960
- Gymnasiepigen – 1960
- Peters baby – 1961
- Een blandt mange – 1961
- Støv på hjernen – 1961
- Soldaterkammerater på efterårsmanøvre – 1961
- Den grønne elevator – 1961
- Eventyr på Mallorca – 1961
- Den hvide hingst – 1961
- To skøre ho'der – 1961
- Prinsesse for en dag – 1962
- Soldaterkammerater på sjov – 1962
- Det støver stadig – 1962
- Det tossede paradis – 1962
- Frk. Nitouche – 1963
- Bussen – 1963
- Tre piger i Paris – 1963
- Hvad med os? – 1963
- Pigen og pressefotografen – 1963
- Støv for alle pengene – 1963
- Et døgn uden løgn – 1963
- Hvis lille pige er du? – 1963
- Majorens oppasser – 1964
- Mord for åbent tæppe – 1964
- Selvmordsskolen – 1964
- Sommer i Tyrol – 1964
- Passer passer piger – 1965
- Mor bag rattet – 1965
- Flådens friske fyre – 1965
- Pigen og millionæren – 1965
- Jensen længe leve – 1965
- Tre små piger – 1966
- Soyas tagsten – 1966
- Flagermusen – 1966
- Pigen og greven – 1966
- Jeg – en elsker – 1966
- Elsk din næste – 1967
- Historien om Barbara – 1967
- Jeg – en marki – 1967
- Nyhavns glade gutter – 1967
- Martha – 1967
- Olsen-banden – 1968
- Soldaterkammerater på bjørnetjeneste – 1968
- Stormvarsel – 1968
- Olsen-banden på spanden – 1969
- Der kom en soldat – 1969
- Den røde rubin – 1969
- Kys til højre og venstre – 1969
- Amour – 1970
- Mazurka på sengekanten – 1970
- Præriens skrappe drenge – 1970
- Hurra for de blå husarer – 1970
- Rend mig i revolutionen – 1970
- Guld til præriens skrappe drenge – 1971
- Tandlæge på sengekanten – 1971
- Ballade på Christianshavn – 1971
- Rektor på sengekanten – 1972
- Motorvej på sengekanten – 1972
- På'en igen Amalie – 1973
- Romantik på sengekanten – 1973
- Nøddebo Præstegård (1974) – 1974
- Pigen og drømmeslottet – 1974
- Piger i trøjen – 1975
- Der må være en sengekant – 1975
- Olsen-banden på sporet – 1975
- Hopla på sengekanten – 1976
- Sømænd på sengekanten – 1976
- Olsen-banden deruda' – 1977
- Agent 69 Jensen i Skyttens tegn – 1978
- Attentat – 1980
- Danmark er lukket – 1980
- Olsen-banden over alle bjerge – 1981
- Walter og Carlo – op på fars hat – 1985
- En verden til forskel – 1989
- Casanova – 1990
- Jesus vender tilbage – 1992
- Krummerne 3 – Fars gode idé – 1994
- Manden som ikke ville dø – 1999
- Gøngehøvdingen – 1992
