= Carl Ottosen =

Danish actor (1918–1972)

- Born: 18 July 1918; Asminderød, Fredensborg, Denmark
- Died: 8 January 1972 (aged 53); Sæby, Denmark
- Occupations: Actor; Screenwriter; Film director
- Years active: 1947-1972

Carl Ottosen (18 July 1918 – 8 January 1972) was a Danish actor, screenwriter and film director. He appeared in 70 films between 1947 and 1972.

== Filmography ==
- De pokkers unger - 1947
- Bag de røde porte - 1951
- Vejrhanen - 1952
- The Crime of Tove Andersen (1953)
- I kongens klær - 1954
- Karen, Maren og Mette - 1954
- Kongeligt besøg - 1954
- En sømand går i land - 1954
- Vores lille by - 1954
- Jeg elsker dig - 1957
- Sønnen fra Amerika - 1957
- Soldaterkammerater - 1958
- Helle for Helene - 1959
- Soldaterkammerater rykker ud - 1959
- Vi er allesammen tossede - 1959
- Forelsket i København - 1960
- Frihedens pris - 1960
- Soldaterkammerater på vagt - 1960
- Tro, håb og trolddom - 1960
- Poeten og Lillemor i forårshumør - 1961
- Reptilicus - 1961
- Soldaterkammerater på efterårsmanøvre - 1961
- Sorte Shara - 1961
- Soldaterkammerater på sjov - 1962
- Journey to the Seventh Planet - 1962
- Et døgn uden løgn - 1963
- Peters landlov - 1963
- Don Olsen kommer til byen - 1964
- Fem mand og Rosa - 1964
- Mord for åbent tæppe - 1964
- Premiere i helvede - 1964
- Tine - 1964
- Flådens friske fyre - 1965
- Passer passer piger - 1965
- Dyden går amok - 1966
- Nu stiger den - 1966
- Pigen og greven - 1966
- Slap af, Frede - 1966
- Soyas tagsten - 1966
- Sult - 1966
- Jeg - en marki - 1967
- Det er ikke appelsiner - det er heste - 1967
- Smukke Arne og Rosa - 1967
- Elsk din næste - 1967
- Soldaterkammerater på bjørnetjeneste - 1968
- Jeg - en kvinde 2 - 1968
- Dyrlægens plejebørn - 1968
- Der kom en soldat - 1969
- Sjov i gaden - 1969
- Amour - 1970
- Præriens skrappe drenge - 1970
- Nøglen til Paradis - 1970
- Guld til præriens skrappe drenge - 1971
- Tandlæge på sengekanten - 1971
- Livsens Ondskab - 1972
