= Hugo Herrestrup =

Danish actor (1933–2009)

- Born: 29 January 1933; Copenhagen, Denmark
- Died: 22 September 2009 (aged 76); Denmark
- Occupation: Actor
- Years active: 1953–1996

Hugo Herrestrup (29 January 1933 – 22 September 2009) was a Danish film actor. He appeared in 35 films between 1953 and 1996. He was born in Copenhagen, Denmark.

== Selected filmography ==
- Father of Four (1953)
- Sømand i knibe (1960)
- Det skete på Møllegården (1960)
- The Last Winter (1960)
- Crazy Paradise (1962)
- Frøken Nitouche (1963)
- Bussen (1963)
- It's Nifty in the Navy (1965)
- Hooray for the Blue Hussars (1970)
