= Henrik Sandberg =

Danish film producer

- Born: 15 May 1915; Copenhagen, Denmark
- Died: 19 March 1993 (aged 77)
- Occupation: Film producer
- Years active: 1955–1979

Henrik Sandberg (15 May 1915 – 19 March 1993) was a Danish film producer. He produced 39 films between 1955 and 1979. He was born in Copenhagen, Denmark. His father was the Danish film director A. W. Sandberg.

== Filmography ==
- Charly & Steffen (1979)
- Alt på et bræt (1977)
- Piger i trøjen 2 (1976)
- Piger i trøjen (1975)
- Takt og tone i himmelsengen (1972)
- Guld til præriens skrappe drenge (1971)
- Hvor er liget, Møller? (1971)
- Præriens skrappe drenge (1970)
- Amour (1970)
- Stille dage i Clichy (1970)
- Pigen fra Egborg (1969)
- Mej och dej (1969)
- Dyrlægens plejebørn (1968)
- Soldaterkammerater på bjørnetjeneste (1968)
- Onkel Joakims hemmelighed (1967)
- Cirkusrevyen 67 (1967)
- Elsk... din næste! (1967)
- Jeg - en marki (1967)
- Pigen og greven (1966)
- Der var engang (1966)
- Pigen og millionæren (1965)
- Flådens friske fyre (1965)
- Livgarden i rød galla (1965)
- Hit House (1965)
- Sommer i Tyrol (1964)
- Majorens oppasser (1964)
- Et døgn uden løgn (1963)
- Pigen og pressefotografen (1963)
- Soldaterkammerater på sjov (1962)
- Den rige enke (1962)
- Soldaterkammerater på efterårsmanøvre (1961)
- Sorte Shara (1961)
- To skøre ho'der (1961)
- Soldaterkammerater på vagt (1960)
- Soldaterkammerater rykker ud (1959)
- Soldaterkammerater (1958)
- Vi som går stjernevejen (1956)
- Tre finder en kro (1955)
- Jorden rundt paa 80 minutter (1955)
