= Fængslende feriedage =

1978 film

- Directed by: Finn Henriksen
- Written by: Finn Henriksen; Poul-Henrik Trampe
- Produced by: Per Årman
- Starring: Jørgen Ryg
- Cinematography: Erik Wittrup Willumsen
- Edited by: Annelise Hovmand
- Release date: 13 October 1978
- Running time: 105 minutes
- Country: Denmark
- Language: Danish

Fængslende feriedage (transl. Captivating holidays) is a 1978 Danish comedy family film directed by Finn Henriksen and starring Jørgen Ryg. This was Dirch Passer's final film.

Four guys serve their prison sentences in the jovial and not-very-authoritarian prison in Maribo.

== Cast ==
- Jørgen Ryg as Henry Villand Møller
- Lisbet Dahl as Agnete Møller
- Birgitte Federspiel as Cornelia Møller
- Dirch Passer as Fængselsinspektør Frost
- Preben Kaas as Galleriejer Toft
- Arthur Jensen as Klausen
- Ole Ernst as Tam
- Bjørn Puggaard-Müller as Arrestforvalter Fritjofsen
- Elin Reimer as Rikke Fritjofsen
- Gyrd Løfquist as Amtsvandindspektør
- Torben Jensen as Narkobetjent Cartsen
- Ulf Pilgaard as Læge
- Bjørn Ploug as Carlsen
- Poul Thomsen as Politiassistent
- Jan Hertz as Betjent
