= Lundtofte Church =

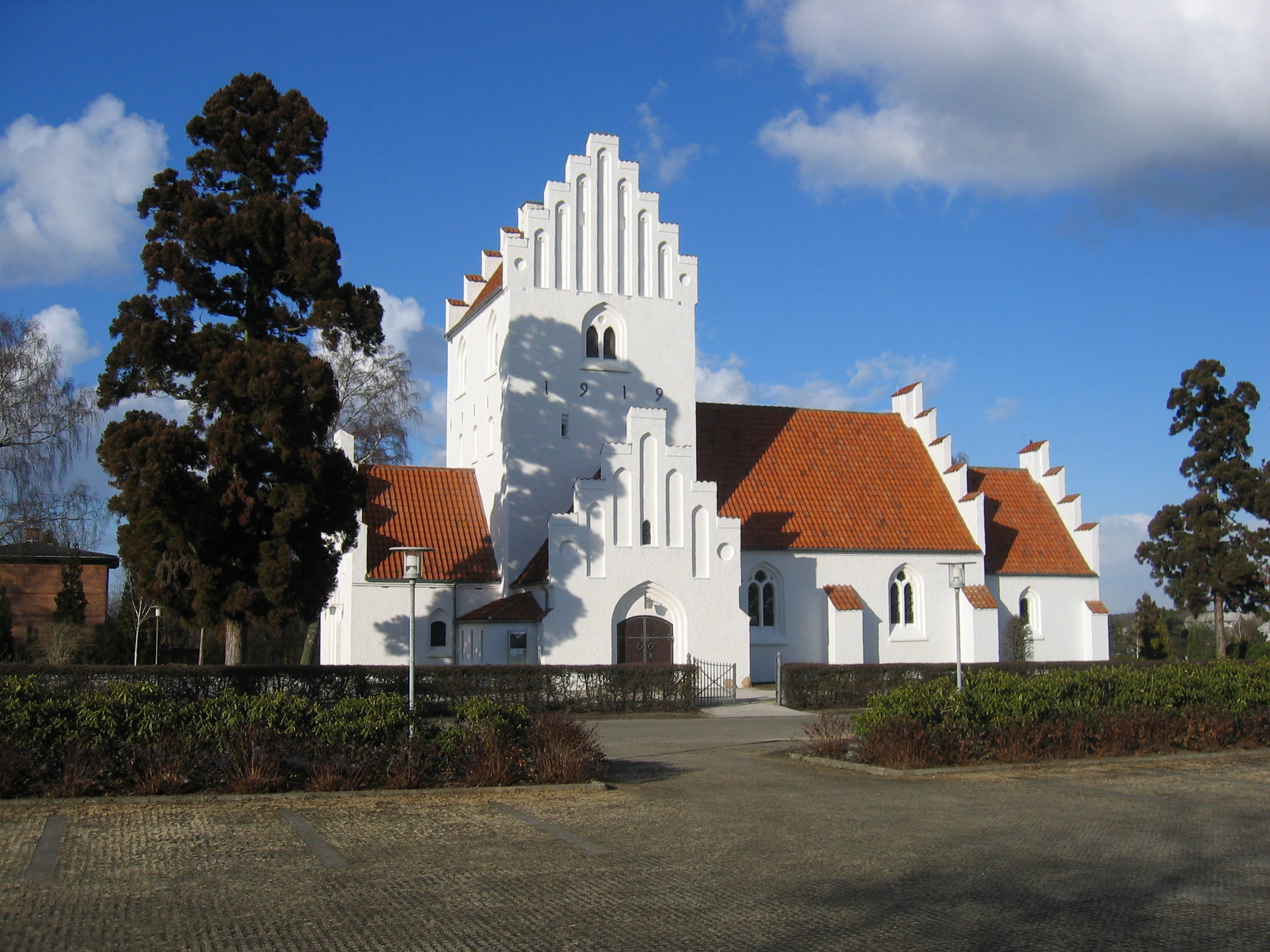
- Lundtofte Church
- 55°47′38.18″N 12°31′5.91″E
- Location: Danmarksvej 36, 2800 Kongens Lyngby
- Country: Denmark
- Denomination: Church of Denmark

History
- Status: Church

Architecture
- Architect: Harald Lønborg-Jensen
- Architectural type: Church
- Groundbreaking: 1919
- Completed: 1921

Specifications
- Materials: Brick

Administration
- Archdiocese: Diocese of Helsingør

Lundtofte Church (Danish: Lundtofte Kirke) is a Church of Denmark parish church in Lyngby-Taarbæk Municipality in the northern suburbs of Copenhagen, Denmark. It was completed in 1921 but is built in the style of a typical Danish white-washed village church.

== History ==
Lundtofte Church was built at local initiative. The site for the church was a donation from Ørholm Grundejerforening and the land for the surrounding cemetery was donated by managing director of Brede Textile Factory Edmund Daverkosen. A driving force behind the project was pastor N. N. Sværborg and almost half of the construction cost was raised through local contributions. The new church was designed by Harald Lønborg-Jensen. The foundation stone was set in 1919 and the new church was inaugurated in 1921. Sværborg was engaged as the first pastor of the new parish in 1930.

== Architecture ==
The church has white-washed walls and a red tile roof. It consists of nave. porch, tower and a chapel in its eastern end. It has seating for approximately 200 people.

== Furnishings ==
The altar table and pulpit are designed in the Neo-Baroque style by Lønborg-Jensen, the church's architect. The altar piece was painted during World War II by local painter Jørn Glob. He was a member of the Danish resistance movement and wanted by the German occupying forces when it was painted.

The organ was made by Frobenius' organ manufactury and has been located in the church since 1970. Its old organ is now located in Lyngby Church.

== Cemetery ==
The cemetery was designed by Gudmund Nyeland Brandt. A lapidarium with historic headstones is located at the western end of the cemetery. Notable burials include painter Mads Henriksen (1853-1940) and film director and producer Finn Henriksen (1933-2008).

== Cultural references ==
Lundtofte Church has been used as a location in the feature films Baronessen fra benzintanken (1960), Peters baby (1961) and In My Life (1978).

== See also ==
- Lyngby Church
