= Valsø Holm =

Danish actor (1906–1987)

- Born: 31 December 1906; Copenhagen, Denmark
- Died: 19 December 1987 (aged 80); Denmark
- Occupation: Actor
- Years active: 1937 - 1982

Valsø Holm (31 December 1906 – 19 December 1987) was a Danish film actor. He appeared in 80 films between 1937 and 1982. He was born in Copenhagen, Denmark and died in Denmark.

== Filmography ==
- En søndag på Amager - 1941
- To som elsker hinanden - 1944
- Det bødes der for - 1944
- Mordets melodi - 1944
- Ditte Menneskebarn - 1946
- De pokkers unger - 1947
- Kristinus Bergman - 1948
- Penge som græs - 1948
- For frihed og ret - 1949
- Din fortid er glemt - 1950
- Vesterhavsdrenge - 1950
- Den gamle mølle på Mols - 1953
- Kongeligt besøg - 1954
- Karen, Maren og Mette - 1954
- Altid ballade - 1955
- Kristiane af Marstal - 1956
- Seksdagesløbet - 1958
- Guld og grønne skove - 1958
- Spion 503 - 1958
- Helle for Helene - 1959
- Poeten og Lillemor - 1959
- Forelsket i København - 1960
- Tro, håb og trolddom - 1960
- Harry og kammertjeneren - 1961
- Landsbylægen - 1961
- Det tossede paradis - 1962
- Frøken April - 1963
- Bussen - 1963
- Støv for alle pengene - 1963
- Vi har det jo dejligt - 1963
- Don Olsen kommer til byen - 1964
- Een pige og 39 sømænd - 1965
- Halløj i himmelsengen - 1965
- Hold da helt ferie - 1965
- Mor bag rattet - 1965
- Næsbygaards arving - 1965
- Slå først, Frede - 1965
- Sytten - 1965
- En ven i bolignøden - 1965
- Flagermusen - 1966
- Soyas tagsten - 1966
- Min kones ferie - 1967
- Far laver sovsen - 1967
- Mig og min lillebror - 1967
- Olsen-banden (film) - 1968
- Det er så synd for farmand - 1968
- Rend mig i revolutionen - 1970
- Tandlæge på sengekanten - 1970
- Den forsvundne fuldmægtig - 1971
- Motorvej på sengekanten - 1972
- Romantik på sengekanten - 1973
- Fætrene på Torndal - 1973
- På'en igen Amalie - 1973
- Olsen-bandens sidste bedrifter - 1974
- Der må være en sengekant - 1975
- Affæren i Mølleby - 1976
- Hopla på sengekanten - 1976
- Pas på ryggen, professor - 1977
- Fængslende feriedage - 1978
- Agent 69 Jensen i Skyttens tegn - 1978
- Undskyld vi er her - 1980
- Det parallelle lig - 1982
