= Gyda Hansen =

Danish actress (1938–2010)

- Born: 7 February 1938; Copenhagen, Denmark
- Died: 20 August 2010 (aged 72); Copenhagen, Denmark
- Occupation: Actress
- Years active: 1963–2009

Gyda Hansen (7 February 1938 – 20 August 2010) was a Danish film actress. She appeared in 22 films between 1963 and 2000.

== Selected filmography ==
- Støv for alle pengene (1963)
- Summer in Tyrol (1964)
- It's Nifty in the Navy (1965)
