= Girls at Arms =

1975 film

- DVD cover
- Directed by: Finn Henriksen
- Written by: Finn Henriksen
- Produced by: Henrik Sandberg
- Starring: Dirch Passer
- Cinematography: Erik Wittrup Willumsen
- Edited by: Lizzi Weischenfeldt
- Release date: 20 August 1975
- Running time: 110 minutes
- Country: Denmark
- Language: Danish

Girls at Arms (Danish: Piger i trøjen) is a 1975 Danish comedy film directed by Finn Henriksen, and starring Dirch Passer and Birte Tove. It was followed by a sequel Girls at Arms 2 the following year.

In this comedy about girls joining the Danish Army, Marianne enlists to continue a long family tradition when her brother would not do it.

== Cast ==
- Dirch Passer as 1st Sergeant Vasby
- Birte Tove as Marianne Valdorff
- Helle Merete Sørensen as Vibsen
- Ulla Jessen as Magda Gammelgaard
- Marianne Tønsberg as Irmgard Martinsen
- Kirsten Walther as Senior Sergeant Meldgård
- Karl Stegger as Major Basse
- Paul Hagen as Lieutenant / Military Psychologist Praas
- Per Pallesen as Sergeant Martinsen
- Ole Monty as Colonel Valdorff
- Lene Axelsen as Nina
- Tina Holmer as Karin
- Magi Stocking as Børgesen
- Torben Jensen as Victor Valdorff
- Lars Høy as Holger
