= Preben Kaas =

Danish actor (1930–1981)

- Born: 30 March 1930; Aalborg, Denmark
- Died: 27 March 1981 (aged 50); Copenhagen, Denmark
- Occupation: Actor
- Years active: 1943–1980
- Spouses: Bodil Nymark Nielsen, Ulla Kaas Larsen, Anne Mari Lie, Lisbet Dahl
- Children: Lone Kaas, Hanne Kaas, Pernille Kaas, Jeppe Kaas, Nikolaj Lie Kaas

Preben Kaas (30 March 1930 – 27 March 1981) was a Danish comedian, actor, script writer and film director. He appeared in more than 50 films between 1943 and 1980. He received the 1970 Bodil for best actor in a supporting role for his role in The Olsen Gang in a Fix.

He was born in Aalborg and died in Copenhagen. Preben Kaas was married to Bodil Nymark Nielsen, Ulla Kaas Larsen, Anne Marie Lie and Lisbet Dahl. He is the father of actor and bandleader Jeppe Kaas and actor Nikolaj Lie Kaas.

== Filmography ==
- Sådan er jeg osse (1980)
- Fængslende feriedage (1978)
- Lille spejl (1978)
- Firmaskovturen (1978)
- Alt på et bræt (1977)
- Julefrokosten (1976)
- Spøgelsestoget (1976)
- Piger i trøjen (1975)
- Den meget talende barber (1974)
- Mafiaen – det er osse mig! (1974)
- Olsen-banden går amok (1973)
- Slap af (1973)
- I din fars lomme (1973)
- På'en igen, Amalie (1973)
- Olsen-banden i Jylland (1971)
- Guld til præriens skrappe drenge (1971)
- Hvor er liget, Møller? (1971)
- Rend mig i revolutionen (1970)
- Præriens skrappe drenge (1970)
- Olsen-banden på spanden (1969)
- Soldaterkammerater på bjørnetjeneste (1968)
- Onkel Joakims hemmelighed (1967)
- Martha (1967)
- Jeg – en marki (1967)
- Pigen og greven (1966)
- Nu stiger den (1966)
- Et minde om to mandage (1966)
- Mor bag rattet (1965)
- Don Olsen kommer til byen (1964)
- Selvmordsskolen (1964)
- Skyggen af en helt (1963)
- Soldaterkammerater på sjov (1962)
- Soldaterkammerater på efterårsmanøvre (1961)
- To skøre ho'der (1961)
- Løgn og løvebrøl (1961)
- Soldaterkammerater på vagt (1960)
- Skibet er ladet med (1960)
- Den sidste vinter (1960)
- Poeten og Lillemor og Lotte (1960)
- Soldaterkammerater rykker ud (1959)
- De sjove år (1959)
- Andre folks børn (1958)
- Soldaterkammerater (1958)
- Seksdagesløbet (1958)
- Stof til eftertanke (1958)
- Far til fire og onkel Sofus (1957)
- Sønnen fra Amerika (1957)
- Bundfald (1957)
- De pokkers unger (1947)
- The Swedenhielm Family (1947)
- Jeg elsker en anden (1946)
- De røde enge (1945)
- Det ender med bryllup (1943)
- Naar man kun er ung (1943)
- Pige uden lige, En (1943)
- S.O.S. – kindtand (1943)
