= Arthur Jensen (actor) =

Danish actor (1897–1981)

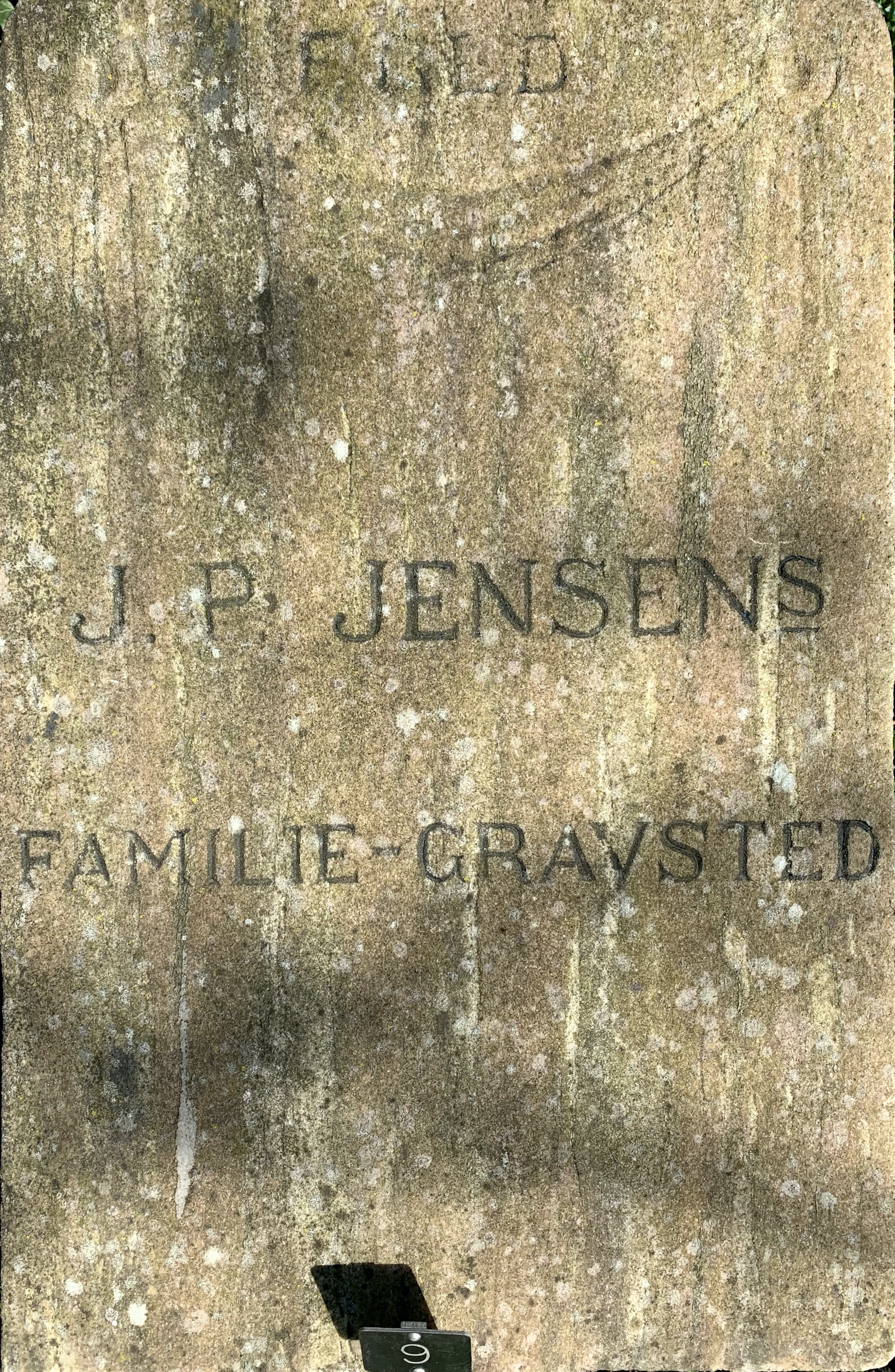
- Born: 9 November 1897; Copenhagen, Denmark
- Died: 28 November 1981 (aged 84); Gentofte, Denmark
- Occupation: Actor
- Years active: 1923–1981

Arthur Jensen (9 November 1897 – 28 November 1981) was a Danish actor whose career lasted for almost 60 years. He made his début on stage at the Royal Danish Theatre in 1923, and he had his big screen début in the silent film Pas på pigerne in 1930.

Today he is arguably best known for his roles as superintendent Meyer in the TV-series Huset på Christianshavn and as Hr. Schwann in the TV-series Matador in the 1970s.

== Selected filmography ==
- Han, hun og Hamlet (1932)
- 5 raske piger (1933)
- Ud i den kolde sne (1934)
- Bag Københavns kulisser (1935)
- Panserbasse (1936)
- Incognito (1937)
- Familien Olsen (1940)
- My Son Peter (1953)
- The Crime of Tove Andersen (1953)
- Bussen (1961)
- Crazy Paradise (1962)
- Venus fra Vestø (1962)
- The Girl and the Press Photographer (1963)
- Miss April (1963)
- Vi har det jo dejligt (1963)
- It's Nifty in the Navy (1965)
- Flagermusen (1966)
- Onkel Joakims hemmelighed (1967)
- The Olsen Gang (1968)
- The Olsen Gang's Big Score (1972)
- Girls at Sea (1977)
- Fængslende feriedage (1978)
