= Gerda Madsen =

Danish actress (1902–1986)

- Born: 4 January 1902; Copenhagen, Denmark
- Died: 26 July 1986 (aged 84); Denmark
- Occupation: Actress
- Years active: 1921–1982

Gerda Madsen (4 January 1902 – 26 July 1986) was a Danish film actress. She appeared in 26 films between 1921 and 1982. She was born and died in Denmark.

== Selected filmography ==
- Häxan (1922)
- Kispus (1956)
- Be Dear to Me (1957)
- Skibet er ladet med (1960)
- Don Olsen kommer til byen (1964)
- Der var engang (1966)
