= Hans W. Petersen =

Danish actor (1897–1974)

- Born: Hans William Petersen; 28 January 1897; Copenhagen, Denmark
- Died: 27 April 1974 (aged 77); Gentofte, Denmark
- Occupation: Actor
- Years active: 1921–1974

Hans W. Petersen (28 January 1897 – 27 April 1974) was a Danish film actor. He appeared in 40 films between 1921 and 1974. He won the Bodil Award for Best Actor in a Supporting Role for his role as Victor in Støvsugerbanden. He was born and had died in Denmark.

== Selected filmography ==
- The White Geisha (1926)
- Skal vi vædde en million? (1932)
- Han, hun og Hamlet (1932)
- Ud i den kolde sne (1934)
- Helle for Helene (1959)
- Det skete på Møllegården (1960)
- Lykkens musikanter (1962)
- Miss April (1963)
- School for Suicide (1964)
- Don Olsen kommer til byen (1964)
- Hunger (1966)
- Amour (1970)
- Oh, to Be on the Bandwagon! (1972)
