= Karl Stegger =

Danish actor (1913–1980)

- Born: 11 January 1913; Aarhus, Denmark
- Died: 13 April 1980 (aged 67); Frederiksberg, Denmark
- Occupations: Actor, Singer
- Years active: 1950–1980

Karl Stegger (11 January 1913, in Aarhus – 13 April 1980, in Frederiksberg) was a Danish actor, who appeared in 158 films which makes him the most used Danish film actor.

He mostly appeared in comedy, but also had some serious roles e.g. as the vicar in Præsten i Vejlby (based on the Steen Steensen Blicher drama). He became famous in 1955 when he replaced Ib Schønberg as the father in the popular Far-til-Fire-film series (Father of Four). Later he appeared in several of the Olsen-banden-movies and the TV series Matador as Consul Holm.

== Selected filmography ==
- The Crime of Tove Andersen (1953)
- The Son (1953)
- Paw (1959)
- Neighbours (1966)
