= The Old Mill on Mols =

1953 film

- Directed by: Annelise Reenberg
- Written by: John Olsen (play); Paul Sarauw (play)
- Produced by: Poul Bang; John Olsen
- Starring: Ib Schønberg; Henny Lindorff Buckhøj; Knud Heglund
- Cinematography: Ole Lytken
- Edited by: Anker Sørensen
- Music by: Sven Gyldmark
- Production company: Saga Studio
- Release date: 23 February 1953
- Running time: 107 minutes
- Country: Denmark
- Language: Danish

The Old Mill on Mols (Danish: Den gamle mølle paa Mols) is a 1953 Danish comedy film directed by Annelise Reenberg and starring Ib Schønberg, Henny Lindorff Buckhøj and Knud Heglund.

== Cast ==
- Ib Schønberg as Peter Jens Christian Rasmussen
- Henny Lindorff Buckhøj as Fru Rasmussen
- Knud Heglund as Møller Sørensen
- Inger Lassen as Fru Sørensen
- Louis Miehe-Renard as Anders Sørensen
- Karin Nellemose as Kristiane Mikkelsen
- Angelo Bruun as Sognerådsformand Niels Kvist
- Kai Holm as Properitær Englund
- Henning Moritzen as Fløgstrup
- Annemette Svendsen as Annemarie Poulsen
- Rasmus Christiansen as Landbetjent Madsen
- Henry Nielsen as Landpost Villy Christensen
- Johannes Meyer as Klemmesen
- Arthur Jensen as Karlsen
- Lili Heglund as Spillelærerinden
- Freddy Koch as Skolelæreren
- Carl Heger as Mejerist Jakobsen
- Karl Stegger as Skomager Hulsøm
- Ove Sprogøe as Buschauffør
- Else Petersen as Frøken Ballerup
- Anna Henriques-Nielsen as Husholderske
- Astrid Kraa as Vred smørrebrødsjomfru
- Betty Helsengreen as Kvinde der taler med Annemarie
- Elin Reimer as Proprietær Englunds datter
- Inger Berthelsen

== Bibliography ==
- John Sundholm. Historical Dictionary of Scandinavian Cinema. Scarecrow Press, 2012.
