= Miskow Makwarth =

Danish actor (1905–1992)

- Born: 5 November 1905; Sørup, Svendborg Municipality, Denmark
- Died: 13 December 1992 (aged 87); Denmark
- Occupation: Actor
- Years active: 1937–1976

Miskow Makwarth (5 November 1905 – 13 December 1992) was a Danish film actor. He appeared in 30 films between 1937 and 1976.

== Filmography ==
- Provinsen kalder – 1935
- Inkognito – 1937
- Flådens blå matroser – 1937
- Mordets melodi – 1944
- Sikken en nat – 1947
- Tre år efter – 1948
- Som sendt fra himlen – 1951
- Bag de røde porte – 1951
- Det store løb – 1952
- Kongeligt besøg – 1954
- Ild og Jord – 1955
- Min datter Nelly – 1955
- Det var på Rundetårn – 1955
- Færgekroen – 1956
- Tag til marked i Fjordby – 1957
- Natlogi betalt – 1957
- Krudt og klunker – 1958
- Støv på hjernen – 1961
- Sorte Shara – 1961
- Tine – 1964
- Premiere i helvede – 1964
- En ven i bolignøden – 1965
- Nyhavns glade gutter – 1967
- Dyrlægens plejebørn – 1968
- Min søsters børn vælter byen – 1968
- Den røde rubin – 1969
- Ta' lidt solskin – 1969
- Der kom en soldat – 1969
- Præriens skrappe drenge – 1970
- Tandlæge på sengekanten – 1971
- Rektor på sengekanten – 1972
- Romantik på sengekanten – 1973
- Julefrokosten – 1976
