= Arvid Müller =

Danish screenwriter

- Born: 2 April 1906; Copenhagen, Denmark
- Died: 1 July 1964 (aged 58); Ordrup, Denmark
- Occupation: Screenwriter
- Years active: 1932-1965

Arvid Müller (2 April 1906 – 1 July 1964) was a Danish screenwriter. He wrote for 36 films between 1932 and 1965. He was born and died in Denmark.

== Filmography ==
- Odds 777 (1932)
- Skal vi vædde en million? (1932)
- Tretten år (1932)
- Nyhavn 17 (1933)
- De blaa drenge (1933)
- Tag det som en mand (1941)
- Ballade i Nyhavn (1942)
- Baby på eventyr (1942)
- While the Attorney Is Asleep (1945)
- Brevet fra afdøde (1946)
- Far betaler (1946)
- Stjerneskud (1947)
- Op og ned langs kysten (1950)
- Min kone er uskyldig (1950)
- Alt dette og Island med (1951)
- Kvinnan bakom allt (1951)
- Rekrut 67 Petersen (1952)
- Den kloge mand (1956)
- Den store gavtyv (1956)
- Kispus (1956)
- Englen i sort (1957)
- Styrmand Karlsen (1958)
- Pigen og vandpytten (1958)
- Styrmand Karlsen (1958)
- Kærlighedens melodi (1959)
- Charles' tante (1959)
- Vi er allesammen tossede (1959)
- Kærlighedens melodi (1959)
- Den grønne elevator (1961)
- Støv på hjernen (1961)
- Sømænd og svigermødre (1962)
- Den kære familie (1962)
- Det støver stadig (1962)
- Den kære familie (1962)
- Tre piger i Paris (1963)
- Alt for kvinden (1964)
- Landmandsliv (1965)
