= Husum (Copenhagen) =

Predominantly residential neighbourhood in Copenhagen, Denmark

Coordinates: 55°42′40″N 12°28′20″E

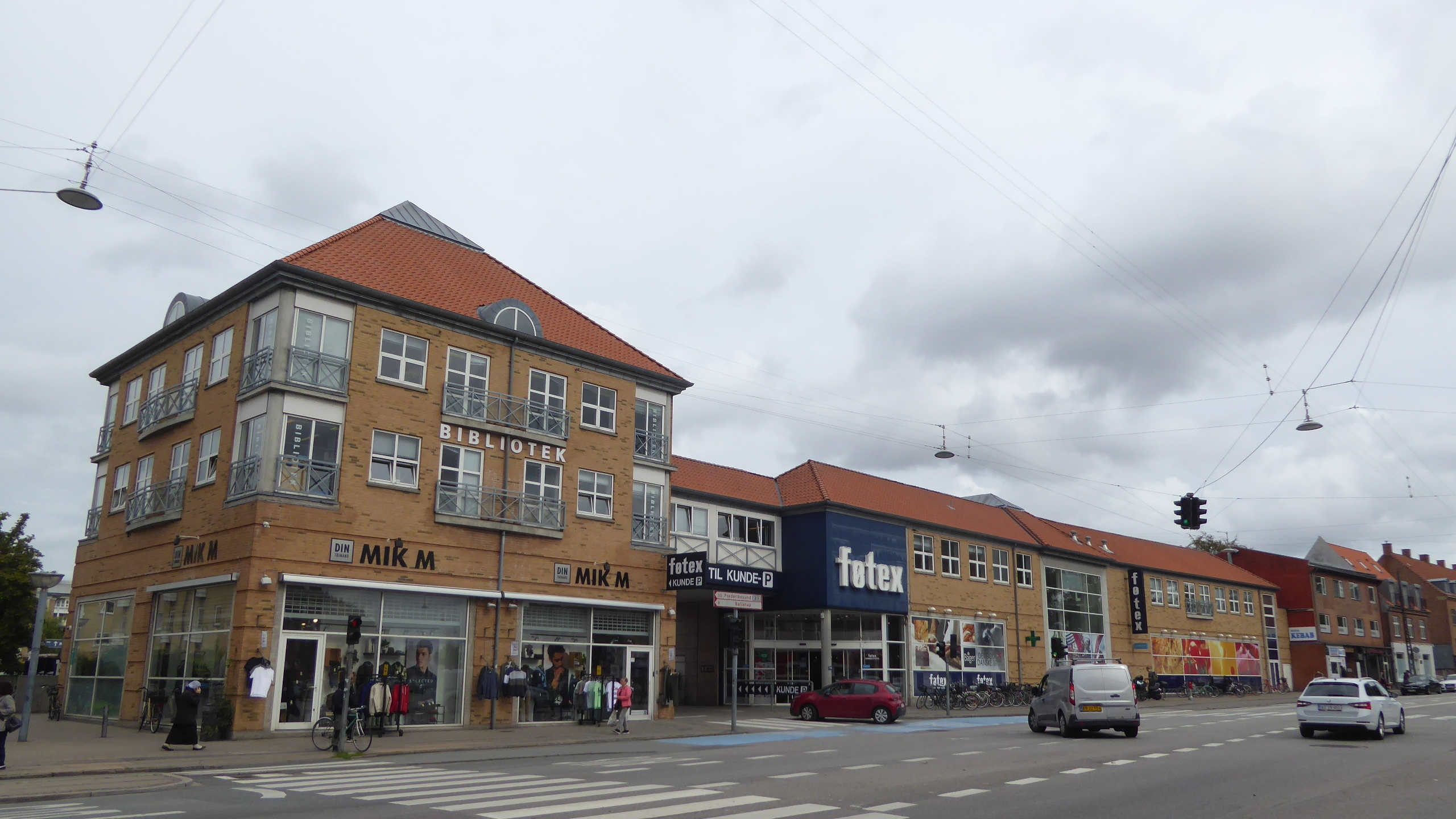
Husum Library and Føtex supermarket on Frederikssundsvej

Husum is a predominantly residential neighbourhood in the Brønshøj-Husum district of Copenhagen, Denmark. Located approximately 7 km to the northwest of the city centre, between Vestvolden and Utterslev Mose, it is centred on Frederikssundsvej and Husum Torv. The area to the north of Frederikssundsvej is dominated by Housing estates while the area to the south of the street consists mainly of single-family detached home and terraced houses.

== History ==
In the Middle Ages, Husum was a village. The land later belonged to Husumgård which was built in 1660 but demolished in 1738. The village consisted of 17 farms in 1782.

Husum was merged with Copenhagen Municipality in 1901. The area became served by trams in 1924 when Line 5 was extended.

== Landmarks ==
Husum Church was designed by Holger Jensen and completed in 1977, replacing a temporary church from 1928. Holger Jensen has also designed Husumvold Church which is from 1960. Nørre Gymnasium is the only gymnasium in Brønshøj-Husum. Husum has three elementary schools: Husum School from 1930, Korsager School from 1948, and Tingbjerg School from 1956. Radiometer is the largest company based in the area.

== Transport ==
Husum railway station is the only S-train station in Brønshøj-Husum.

Husum Torv is a hub for bus transport. It is served by bus lines 5A, 200S, 350S, 22, 132, 166 and 81N.

== Cultural references ==
Voldfløjen 2–4 in Husum is used as location for the suburban housing estate Solvænget (Lykkevej 2) where all the characters live in the 1960s film series Støv på hjernen (1961), Det støver stadig (1962), Støv for alle pengene (1963) and Passer passer piger (1965).

The neighbourhood of Husum is a major location in season 1 of the TV2 series Rita (2012), as the neighbourhood in which Rita's son, Ricco, and Ricco's spouse, Bitten, live. It is also the location of their sandwich shop that they briefly run and the nail salon that preceded it.
