= Carl Johan Hviid =

Danish actor (1899–1964)

- Born: 27 June 1899; Frederiksberg, Denmark
- Died: 21 October 1964 (aged 65); Roskilde, Denmark
- Occupation: Actor
- Years active: 1939–1964

Carl Johan Hviid (27 June 1899 – 21 October 1964) was a Danish film actor. He appeared in 29 films between 1938 and 1964. He was born and died in Denmark.

== Selected filmography ==
- Kongen bød – 1938
- Champagnegaloppen – 1938
- Under byens tage – 1938
- Sommerglæder – 1940
- En herre i kjole og hvidt – 1942
- Søren Søndervold – 1942
- Erik Ejegods pilgrimsfærd – 1943
- Det store ansvar – 1944
- De tre skolekammerater – 1944
- Otte akkorder – 1944
- Det kære København – 1944
- Mens sagføreren sover – 1945
- Den usynlige hær – 1945
- Brevet fra afdøde – 1946
- Far betaler – 1946
- Soldaten og Jenny – 1947
- Penge som græs – 1948
- Den stjålne minister – 1949
- For frihed og ret – 1949
- Lynfotografen – 1950
- Min kone er uskyldig – 1950
- Smedestræde 4 – 1950
- Mød mig på Cassiopeia – 1951
- Bag de røde porte – 1951
- Count Svensson (1951)
- Farlig ungdom – 1953
- Karen, Maren og Mette – 1954
- En sømand går i land – 1954
- Arvingen – 1954
- Himlen er blå – 1954
- I kongens klær – 1954
- Blændværk – 1955
- På tro og love – 1955
- Færgekroen – 1956
- Kristiane af Marstal – 1956
- Far til fire i byen – 1956
- Tag til marked i Fjordby – 1956
- Over alle grænser – 1958
- Den sidste vinter – 1960
- Weekend – 1962
- Pigen og pressefotografen – 1963
- Hvis lille pige er du? – 1963
- Støvsugerbanden – 1963
- Halløj i himmelsengen – 1965
