= Moster fra Mols =

1943 film

- Directed by: Poul Bang; Axel Frische; Grete Frische; Carl Hegner
- Written by: Axel Frische
- Produced by: John Olsen
- Starring: Rasmus Christiansen
- Cinematography: Rudolf Frederiksen; Alf Schnéevoigt
- Production company: Saga Studios
- Release date: 24 February 1943
- Running time: 86 minutes
- Country: Denmark
- Language: Danish

Moster fra Mols is a 1943 Danish family film directed by Poul Bang and starring Rasmus Christiansen.

== Plot ==
A wealthy businessman and his wife deal with gardening troubles and more importantly, their daughter's depression after she has had several romantic problems.

== Cast ==
- Rasmus Christiansen - Fabrikant Palle Nelsøe
- Marie Niedermann - Emma Nelsøe
- Gerda Gilboe - Else Nelsøe
- Inger Stender - Grethe Holst
- Agis Winding - Fru Hansen
- Christian Arhoff - Slagter Hans Nielsen
- Poul Reichhardt - Handelsrejsende Peter Jacobsen
- Carl Fischer - Konstruktør Snuffelbach
- Buster Larsen - Tilskuer
