= Bent Vejlby =

Danish actor (1924–2020)

- Born: 20 March 1924; Vejlby, Denmark
- Died: 31 August 2020 (aged 96); Kirke Hyllinge, Denmark
- Other name: Hans Bent Vejlby Hansen
- Occupations: Actor and teacher
- Years active: 1952–1973

Bent Vejlby (20 March 1924 – 31 August 2020) was a Danish film actor and school teacher. He appeared in 40 films between 1952 and 1973. He was born in Vejlby, Denmark.

== Filmography ==
- Kærlighedsdoktoren (1952)
- Mig og min familie (1957)
- Tag til marked i Fjordby (1957)
- Styrmand Karlsen (1958)
- Vi er allesammen tossede (1959)
- Kvindelist og kærlighed (1960)
- Sømand i knibe (1960)
- Reptilicus (1961)
- Gøngehøvdingen (1961)
- Soldaterkammerater på sjov (1962)
- Dronningens vagtmester (1963)
- Støv for alle pengene (1963)
- Majorens oppasser (1964)
- Slottet (1964)
- Når enden er go' (1964)
- Mord for åbent tæppe (1964)
- Flådens friske fyre (1965)
- Een pige og 39 sømænd (1965)
- Næsbygårds arving (1965)
- Nu stiger den (1966)
- Min søsters børn (1966)
- Slap af, Frede! (1966)
- I stykker (1966)
- Det er ikke appelsiner, det er heste (1967)
- Onkel Joakims hemmelighed (1967)
- Mig og min lillebror (1967)
- Det var en lørdag aften (1968)
- Soldaterkammerater på bjørnetjeneste (1968)
- Mig og min lillebror og storsmuglerne (1968)
- Romulus den store (1969)
- Helle for Lykke (1969)
- Pigen fra Egborg (1969)
- Mazurka på sengekanten (1970)
- Premiere (1970)
- Til lykke Hansen (1971)
- Sejle op ad åen (1972)
- Man sku være noget ved musikken (1972)
- På vej til Hilda (1972)
- Olsen-bandens store kup (1972)
- Gips (1973)
