= Hooray for the Blue Hussars =

1970 film

- Directed by: Annelise Reenberg
- Written by: Annelise Reenberg; Jerrard Tickell
- Produced by: Leif Jul; Fritz Trap
- Starring: Emil Hass Christensen
- Cinematography: Ole Lytken
- Edited by: Lizzi Weischenfeldt
- Music by: Sven Gyldmark
- Production company: Saga Studios
- Release date: 20 November 1970
- Running time: 100 minutes
- Country: Denmark
- Language: Danish

Hooray for the Blue Hussars (Danish: Hurra for de blå husarer) is a 1970 Danish comedy film directed by Annelise Reenberg and starring Emil Hass Christensen.

It's 1893 and choosing a new lieutenant for the cavalry is not to be taken lightly.

== Cast ==
- Emil Hass Christensen - Oberst Parsdorff
- Lone Hertz - Charlotte Parsdorff
- Niels Hinrichsen - Løjtnant Adam Lercke
- Peter Bonke - Lt. Ditlev Liljenkrone
- Ghita Nørby - Frida
- Dirch Passer - Spjellerup
- Jørgen Kiil - Ritmester von Rabenberg
- Bjørn Puggaard-Müller - Pastor Berg
- Susse Wold - Henrietta / Clarissa
- Henny Lindorff Buckhøj - Pastorinden
- Ole Søltoft - Løjtnant
- Søren Strømberg - Løjtnant
- Peter Hetsch - Løjtnant
- Jørn Madsen - Løjtnant
- Thecla Boesen - Gæst hos pastorinden
- Lili Heglund - Gæst hos pastorinden
- Solveig Sundborg - Gæst hos pastorinden
- Karl Gustav Ahlefeldt - Adams' far
- Signi Grenness - Adam's mor
- Povl Wøldike - Ditlev's far
- Lilli Holmer - Ditlev's mor
- Paul Hagen - Krovært
- Hugo Herrestrup - Krovært
- Bendt Reiner - Husar
- Ulla Jessen - Dame på kro
