= The Girl and the Press Photographer =

1963 film

- Directed by: Sven Methling
- Written by: Solveig Ersgaard; Peer Guldbrandsen
- Produced by: Dirch Passer; Henrik Sandberg
- Starring: Dirch Passer
- Cinematography: Henning Kristiansen
- Edited by: Sven Methling; Ernst Møholt
- Release date: 15 February 1963
- Running time: 100 minutes
- Country: Denmark
- Language: Danish

The Girl and the Press Photographer (Danish: Pigen og pressefotografen) is a 1963 Danish comedy film directed by Sven Methling and starring Dirch Passer and Ghita Nørby.

== Plot ==
When a male photographer and a female reporter meet at the newspaper they work for in Copenhagen, they become friends. She helps him get an apartment with a marriage of convenience--or so he thinks.

== Cast ==
- Dirch Passer as Jens August Sebastian 'Bastian' Dusinius
- Ghita Nørby as Lene Kristiansen
- Paul Hagen as Søren
- Judy Gringer as Yvette Salomonsen
- Axel Strøbye as Advokat Aksel Gormsen
- Ove Sprogøe as Madsen
- Bjørn Watt-Boolsen as Oberst Arnold Kristiansen
- Bodil Steen as Charlotte Kristiansen
- Kirsten Passer as Husholderske
- Arthur Jensen as Vicevært
- Carl Johan Hviid as Giftefoged
- Poul Clemmensen as En portvagt i lufthavnen
- Herman Gellin as Sir Thomas Gellinski
- Povl Wøldike as Orkesterleder
- Bjørn Spiro as Bodyguard for udenlandsk diplomat
- Finn Hillingsøe as Bodyguard for udenlandsk diplomat
- Albert Watson as Bodyguard for udenlandsk diplomat
- Gunnar Strømvad as Bodyguard for udenlandsk diplomat
- Holger Vistisen as Bodyguard for udenlandsk diplomat
- Ellen Margrethe Stein as Kvinde hvis lejlighed brænder
- Aase Werrild as En dame på gaden
- Jan Priiskorn-Schmidt as Piccolo
- Hanne Borchsenius as Anna Gormsen
- Sigrid Horne-Rasmussen as Kvinde i bolignævnet
- Jarl Kulle as Professor
- Solveig Ersgaard
