= Englen i sort =

1957 film

- Directed by: Sven Methling
- Written by: Arvid Müller; Erling Poulsen
- Produced by: Ellen Nielsen
- Starring: Emil Hass Christensen
- Cinematography: Kjeld Arnholtz
- Edited by: Anker Sørensen
- Release date: 18 November 1957
- Running time: 112 minutes
- Country: Denmark
- Language: Danish

Englen i sort is a 1957 Danish family film directed by Sven Methling and starring Emil Hass Christensen.

== Cast ==
- Emil Hass Christensen - Overlæge Arne Brandt
- Helle Virkner - Betina Brandt
- Dorthe Jørgensen - Lille Bente Brandt
- Poul Reichhardt - Lennart Sommer
- Ingeborg Brams - Elise Sommer
- Ellen Gottschalch - Fru Hennesen
- Knud Heglund - Simonsen
- Birgit Pouplier - Estella Simonsen
- Suzanne Bech - Sekretær hos Brandt
- Elsie Neubert - Sygeplejerske
- Bodil Miller - Lili
- Dyveke Reumert - Nora
- Vera Stricker
- Kjeld Jacobsen - Kriminalinspektør
- Karl Stegger - Flyttemand
- Holger Vistisen
- Thecla Boesen
- Albert Watson
- Johannes Marott - Portier på Hotel City
- Kjeld Vistisen
