= Hendes store aften =

1954 film

- Directed by: Annelise Reenberg
- Written by: John Olsen; Annelise Reenberg
- Produced by: Poul Bang
- Starring: Helle Virkner
- Cinematography: Kjeld Arnholtz
- Edited by: Anker Sørensen
- Music by: Sven Gyldmark
- Production company: Saga Studio
- Release date: 12 March 1954
- Running time: 97 minutes
- Country: Denmark
- Language: Danish

Hendes store aften is a 1954 Danish romance film directed by Annelise Reenberg and starring Helle Virkner.

== Cast ==
- Helle Virkner - Marianne Friis
- Poul Reichhardt - John Bagger
- Johannes Meyer - Vicevært Julius Jensen
- Karin Nellemose - Ejer af Chez Madame
- Angelo Bruun - Hr. Poul
- Bodil Steen - Frk. Lilly
- Olaf Ussing - Sagfører Simonsen
- Lili Heglund - Kunde
- Poul Müller - Overtjener på Nimb
- Ib Schønberg - Himself
- Wandy Tworek - Himself
- Gaby Stenberg - Yvonne
- Betty Lange - Fru Simonsen
- Edith Hermansen
