= Det var paa Rundetaarn =

1955 film

- Directed by: Poul Bang
- Written by: John Olsen
- Produced by: John Olsen
- Starring: Dirch Passer
- Cinematography: Aage Wiltrup
- Edited by: Edith Nisted Nielsen
- Music by: Sven Gyldmark
- Production company: Saga Studio
- Release date: 26 December 1955
- Running time: 104 minutes
- Country: Denmark
- Language: Danish

Det var paa Rundetaarn is a 1955 Danish comedy film directed by Poul Bang and starring Dirch Passer and Ove Sprogøe.

== Cast ==
- Dirch Passer as Poul Jensen
- Ove Sprogøe as Hans Ramløse
- Clara Østø as Fru Hambro
- Kjeld Petersen as Landsretsagfører Hartsen
- Bodil Steen as Fru Hartsen
- Lili Heglund as Fru Holm (Fru Hartsens mor)
- Karen Berg as Fru Hald
- Anne-Marie Juhl as Johanne Hald
- Bodil Miller as Grete Hald
- Ole Monty as Privatdetektiv Aage F.I. Duus
- Buster Larsen as Lasse Larsen
- Sigrid Horne-Rasmussen as Garderobedame
- Mogens Brandt as Indehaver af detektivbureau
- Asta Esper Hagen Andersen as Dame I finanshovedkassen (as Asta Esper Hagen)
- Miskow Makwarth as Grosser Hejresen
- Vivi Svendsen as Elisabeth Hejresen
- Paul Hagen as Isbilchauffør
