= Buckhøj =

Buckhøj is a Danish surname and translates literally to "beech hill" or "beech mound. Notable people with the surname include:

- Henny Lindorff Buckhøj (1902–1979), Danish film actress
- Jørgen Buckhøj (1935–1994), Danish actor
- Per Buckhøj (1902–1964), Danish film actor
