= Maria Garland =

Danish actress (1889–1967)

- Born: Johanne Maria Nathalia Svendsen; 16 May 1889; Copenhagen, Denmark
- Died: 26 October 1967 (aged 78); Flensburg, Germany

Maria Garland (16 May 1889 – 26 October 1967) was a Danish stage and film actress.

== Selected filmography ==
- Verdensgiften – 1914
- Professor Petersens Plejebørn – 1924
- En kæreste for meget – 1924
- Kraft og skønhed – 1928
- Kys, klap og kommers – 1929
- Nyhavn 17 – 1933
- Lynet – 1934
- Flight from the Millions – 1934
- Nøddebo Præstegård – 1934
- Barken Margrethe af Danmark – 1934
- København, Kalundborg og – ? – 1934
- Prisoner Number One- 1935
- Mille, Marie og mig – 1937
- I dag begynder livet – 1939
- Familien Olsen – 1940
- Pas på svinget i Solby – 1940
- Tror du jeg er født i går? – 1941
- Far skal giftes – 1941
- Søren Søndervold – 1942
- Forellen – 1942
- Frøken Vildkat – 1942
- Alle mand på dæk – 1942
- Et skud før midnat – 1942
- Ebberød Bank – 1943
- Det brændende spørgsmål – 1943
- Hans onsdagsveninde – 1943
- En pige uden lige – 1943
- Mine kære koner – 1943
- To som elsker hinanden – 1944
- Den usynlige hær – 1945
- Ditte Menneskebarn – 1946
- Soldaten og Jenny – 1947
- Mani – 1947
- Lykke på rejsen – 1947
- The Swedenhielm Family – 1947
- Mens porten var lukket – 1948
- Vi vil ha' et barn – 1949
- De røde heste – 1950
- Dorte – 1951
- Hold fingrene fra mor – 1951
- Det gamle guld – 1951
- Husmandstøsen – 1952
- Sønnen – 1953
- Hejrenæs – 1953
- Sukceskomponisten – 1954
- Min datter Nelly – 1955
- Det lille hotel – 1958
- Mor skal giftes – 1958
- Baronessen fra benzintanken – 1960
- Komtessen – 1961
- Den rige enke – 1962
- Hvis lille pige er du? – 1963
- Gys og gæve tanter – 1966
- Tre små piger – 1966
