= Hvis lille pige er du? =

1963 film

Hvis lille pige er du? (Whose Little Girl Are You?)
- Directed by: Erik Balling
- Written by: Erik Balling
- Starring: Ghita Nørby
- Cinematography: Jørgen Skov
- Distributed by: Nordisk Film
- Release date: 1 August 1963
- Running time: 94 minutes
- Country: Denmark
- Language: Danish

Hvis lille pige er du? (transl. Whose little girl are you?) is a 1963 Danish comedy film directed by Erik Balling and starring Ghita Nørby.

== Plot ==
A Danish secretary is tired of bosses hitting on her and having to quit her job. She decides to find a rich bachelor as boss and getting a lot of money, after marrying and divorcing him. Things do not go according to plan.

== Cast ==
- Ghita Nørby - Eva
- Dirch Passer - Hans
- Maria Garland - Hans' mor
- Johannes Meyer - Zimmermann
- Paul Hagen - Benny
- Judy Gringer - Susie
- Ingeborg Skov - Fru Thurøe
- Baard Owe - Johannes
- Carl Johan Hviid - Joachim
- Hans Kurt - Direktør Jansen
- Birgitte Federspiel - Fru Jansen
