= Ved kongelunden... =

1953 film

- Film poster
- Directed by: Poul Bang
- Written by: John Olsen; Paul Sarauw
- Starring: Dirch Passer
- Cinematography: Ole Lytken
- Edited by: Anker Sørensen
- Music by: Sven Gyldmark
- Production company: Saga Studio
- Release date: 1953
- Running time: 88 minutes
- Country: Denmark
- Language: Danish

Ved kongelunden... is a 1953 Danish comedy film directed by Poul Bang and starring Dirch Passer.

In this 88-minute film, residents of a small countryside community near Copenhagen find their way to love.

== Cast ==
- Dirch Passer - Konduktør Svendsen
- Ove Sprogøe - Vognstyrer Iversen
- Louis Miehe-Renard - Jørgen Rasmussen
- Birgit Sadolin - Annemarie Olsen (as Birgit Møller-Petersen)
- Henry Nielsen - Murer Jens Rasmussen
- Inger Lassen - Fru Emma Rasmussen
- Betty Helsengreen - Fru Olga Olsen
- Buster Larsen - Knud Hansen
- Kate Mundt - Anna
- Verner Thaysen - Ingeniør Valter Bruun
- Ib Schønberg - Tjener Olsen
- Knud Schrøder - Værkfører Jørgensen (uncredited)
