= Peters baby =

1961 film

- Directed by: Annelise Reenberg
- Written by: Børge Müller
- Produced by: Poul Bang
- Starring: Ebbe Langberg
- Cinematography: Ole Lytken
- Edited by: Edith Nisted Nielsen
- Music by: Sven Gyldmark
- Production company: Saga Studio
- Release date: 28 July 1961
- Running time: 96 minutes
- Country: Denmark
- Language: Danish

Peter's baby is a 1961 Danish comedy film directed by Annelise Reenberg and starring Ebbe Langberg.

The film begins with Peter Bergman receiving a letter the day before his wedding, from a French hospital regarding the need for a blood test. He puts two and two together, and figures out he has a kid with a Danish girl he met in Paris. He goes to the hospital in France, and when he learns that the mother wants to put the baby up for adoption, he decides to flee the hospital with his son and tries to get him back to Denmark.

== Cast ==
- Ebbe Langberg as Peter Bergman
- Ghita Nørby as Tony
- Dario Campeotto as Sanger
- Dirch Passer as William Thorsen
- Inger Stender as Peters mor
- Emil Hass Christensen as Peters far
- Gabriel Axel as Fransk politimand
- Mogens Brandt as Fransk hotelejer
- Paul Hagen as Holgersen
- Judy Gringer as Kirsten
- Bjørn Puggaard-Müller as Kordegn
