= Gyrd Løfqvist =

Danish actor (1921–2012)

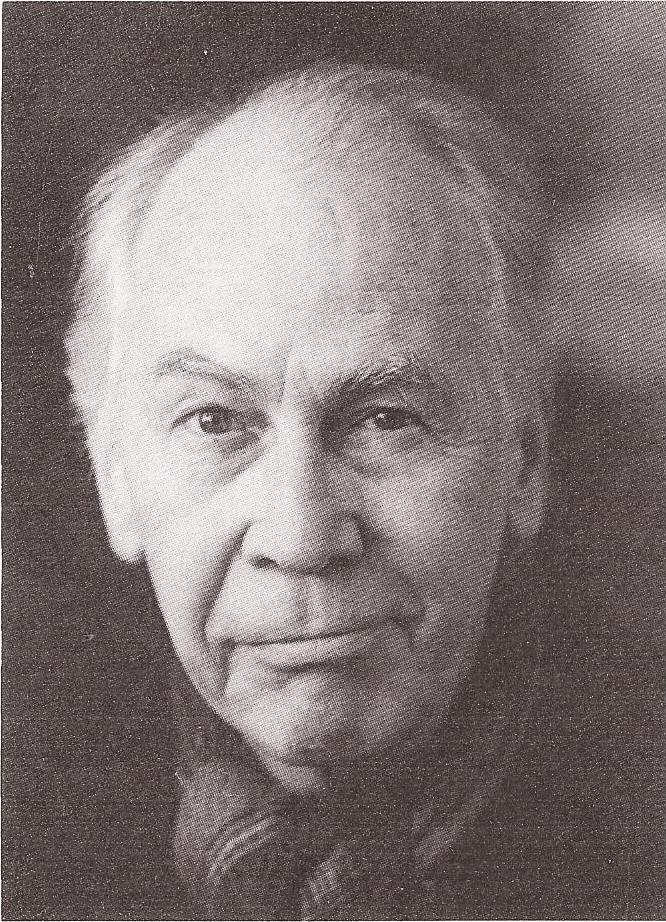
- Born: 2 June 1921; Copenhagen, Denmark
- Died: 1 May 2012 (aged 90); Copenhagen, Denmark
- Occupation: Actor
- Years active: 1945-2006

Gyrd Løfqvist (2 June 1921 – 1 May 2012) was a Danish film actor. He appeared in more than sixty films from 1945 to 2006. Löfqvist came from a Norwegian-Swedish family living in Denmark. His mother was Norwegian, which gave him the Norwegian first name Oluf Gyrd, and from his father he had the Swedish last name Löfquist.

== Filmography ==
Film
| Year | Title | Role | Notes |
|---|---|---|---|
| 1945 | En ny dag gryer | Mogens | |
| 1945 | The Invisible Army | | |
| 1945 | The Red Meadows | Gustav | |
| 1947 | Jenny and the Soldier | Politibetjent | Uncredited |
| 1951 | Unge piger forsvinder i København | Læge | Uncredited |
| 1951 | Nålen | Filmoperatør | |
| 1951 | Kvinnan bakom allt | Third Aide | |
| 1954 | I kongens klæ'r | Politibetjent Høegh | |
| 1966 | Utro | | |
| 1968 | Det var en lørdag aften | Læge | |
| 1972 | Oh, to Be on the Bandwagon! | Café-ejeren | |
| 1975 | Vi er både rigtig og kloge | Man | |
| 1976 | Familien Gyldenkål sprænger banken | Wilfred Winkel | |
| 1978 | Hør, var der ikke en som lo? | Kontormanden | |
| 1978 | Fængslende feriedage | Amtsvandindspektør | |
| 1981 | Historien om Kim Skov | Skolelærer | |
| 1982 | Det parallelle lig | Hr. Mikkelsen | |
| 1983 | Der er et yndigt land | Willy | |
| 1983 | Kurt og Valde | Togkonduktør | |
| 1987 | Peter von Scholten | Læge | |
| 1988 | Elvis Hansen, en samfundshjælper | Valdemar Brodersen | |
| 1990 | Camping | Ældre mand | |
| 1990 | Casanova | Dørvogter Plejehjem | |
| 1994 | Nightwatch | Den gamle nattevagt | |
| 1995 | Elsker elsker ikke... | Guldbrudegom | |
| 1997 | Ørnens øje | Guard | |
| 2001 | Ørkenens juvel | Veterinary | |
| 2003 | Lykkevej | Far | |
| 2005 | Adam's Apples | Poul Nordkap | |
| 2006 | Drømmen | Farfar | (final film role) |
