= The Girl and the Millionaire =

1965 film

- Directed by: Ebbe Langberg
- Written by: Peer Guldbrandsen; Preben Kaas; Carl Ottosen
- Produced by: Dirch Passer; Henrik Sandberg; Palle Schnedler-Sørensen
- Starring: Dirch Passer
- Cinematography: Henning Bendtsen
- Edited by: Christian Hartkopp
- Music by: Bent Fabricius-Bjerre
- Release date: 15 October 1965
- Running time: 101 minutes
- Country: Denmark
- Language: Danish

The Girl and the Millionaire (Danish: Pigen og millionæren) is a 1965 Danish comedy film directed by Ebbe Langberg and starring Dirch Passer.

The film tells the tale of a millionaire who gets amnesia after a hit to the head. He now has to rediscover his past and decide what kind of man he wants to be in the future.

== Cast ==
- Dirch Passer as Direktør Jens Møller
- Birgitte Bruun as Koncertpianist Marlene Brandt
- Malene Schwartz as Britta
- Sigrid Horne-Rasmussen as Fru J.O. Sand
- Bodil Steen as Conny
- Jessie Rindom as Frk. Nielsen
- Johnna Lillebjerg as Lis
- Jeanne Darville as Ester
- Paul Hagen as Butler Morris
- Ove Sprogøe as Advokat Andersen
- Axel Strøbye as Max
- Karl Stegger as Betjent
- Preben Mahrt as Kontorchef hos Jens Møller
- Jesper Langberg as Sælger Mikkelsen
- Mogens Brandt as Overtjener
- Carl-Gustaf Lindstedt as Direktør J.O. Sand
- Jan Priiskorn-Schmidt as Orla
- Birger Jensen as Receptionist hos Jens Møller
- Bent Fabricius-Bjerre as Pianist (uncredited)
- Ebbe Langberg as Mand på gaden (uncredited)
- Ghita Nørby as Kvinde på gaden (uncredited)
