= Hanne Borchsenius =

Danish actress (1935–2012)

- Born: 30 November 1935; Frederiksberg, Denmark
- Died: 19 March 2012 (aged 76); Charlottenlund, Danmark
- Occupation: Actress
- Years active: 1956–1988

Hanne Borchsenius (30 November 1935 – 19 March 2012) was a Danish film actress. She appeared in 32 films between 1956 and 1988.

== Filmography ==
- The Girl in a Swing (1988)
- Kampen om den røde ko (1987)
- Misantropen (1974)
- Dukkehjem, Et (1974)
- Askepot (1973)
- The Night Visitor (1971)
- Og så er der bal bagefter (1970)
- Mellem fem og syv (1970)
- Der kom en soldat (1969)
- Min søsters børn vælter byen (1968)
- Dage i min fars hus (1968)
- Martha (1967)
- Slap af, Frede! (1966)
- Naboerne (1966)
- Passer passer piger (1965)
- Premiere i helvede (1964)
- This Is Denmark (1964)
- Alt for kvinden (1964)
- Majorens oppasser (1964)
- Støv for alle pengene (1963)
- Vi voksne (1963)
- Tre piger i Paris (1963)
- Pigen og pressefotografen (1963)
- Det støver stadig (1962)
- Det stod i avisen (1962)
- Han, Hun, Dirch og Dario (1962)
- Landsbylægen (1961)
- Far til fire med fuld musik (1961)
- Støv på hjernen (1961)
- Sorte Shara (1961)
- Løgn og løvebrøl (1961)
- Natlogi betalt (1957)
- Ung leg (1956)
