= Med kærlig hilsen =

1971 film

- Poster by Aage Lundvald
- Directed by: Gabriel Axel
- Written by: Gabriel Axel
- Produced by: Gabriel Axel, Henning Karmark
- Starring: Buster Larsen, Birte Tove
- Cinematography: Rolf Rønne
- Edited by: Anders Refn
- Music by: Bent Fabricius-Bjerre
- Distributed by: ASA Filmudlejning
- Release date: 20 August 1971
- Running time: 88 minutes
- Country: Denmark
- Language: Danish

Med kærlig hilsen (With Love) is a 1971 Danish erotic film written and directed by Gabriel Axel.

== Cast ==
- Buster Larsen
- Birte Tove
- Gabriel Axel
- Grethe Holmer
- Birgit Brüel
- Jørgen Kiil
- Lis Adelvard
- Bodil Miller
- Hanne Winther-Jørgensen
- Edward Fleming
- Benny Hansen
- Lily Broberg
- Eddie Karnil
- Lone Helmer
- Gotha Andersen
- Lizzie Corfixen
- Annie Birgit Garde
- Bent Christensen
- Otto Brandenburg
