= Frøken Nitouche =

1963 film

- Directed by: Annelise Reenberg
- Written by: Henri Meilhac & Albert Millaud (original play); Børge Müller
- Produced by: Poul Bang
- Starring: Lone Hertz; Dirch Passer; Ebbe Langberg
- Cinematography: Ole Lytken
- Edited by: Lizzi Weischenfeldt
- Production company: Saga Studios
- Release date: 16 August 1963
- Running time: 104 minutes
- Country: Denmark
- Language: Danish

Frøken Nitouche (transl. Miss Nitouche) is a 1963 Danish comedy film directed by Annelise Reenberg and starring Lone Hertz and Dirch Passer. It is based on the operetta Mam'zelle Nitouche.

== Cast ==
- Lone Hertz as Frk. Nitouche / Charlotte Borg
- Dirch Passer as Floridor / Celestin
- Ebbe Langberg as Løjtnant Parsberg
- Hans Kurt as Ritmester Alfred Schmuck
- Else Marie Hansen as Fromme Moder
- Malene Schwartz as Corinna
- Paul Hagen as Rasmus
- Ove Sprogøe as Ferdinand Piper
- Tove Wisborg as Skuespiller
- Beatrice Palner as Actress
- Lili Heglund as Priorindens højre hånd
- Hugo Herrestrup as Løjtnant ved 27. Husarregiment
- Katy Bødtger as Frk. Nitouche / Charlotte Borg (singing voice)
- Arne Seldorf
- Vagn Kramer
- Gunnar Bigum
