= Poul Bang =

Danish film producer (1905-1967)

- Born: 17 February 1905; Copenhagen, Denmark
- Died: 6 July 1967 (aged 62); Denmark
- Occupations: Film producer Film director
- Years active: 1932–1967

Poul Bang (17 February 1905 – 6 July 1967) was a Danish film producer and director. He produced 24 films between 1950 and 1967. He also directed 23 films between 1943 and 1963.

== Life ==
He was the son of Camillo Cavour Bang (1861–1949) and Augusta Pouline Boas (1868–1919). His brother Peter Boas Bang, five years older, was founder and co-owner of Bang & Olufsen, where his father was for a time chairman of the board.

Bang was trained as an engineer and started working as a sound engineer at Fotorama in 1932. He later worked at Palladium and ASA Film before becoming production manager, instructor and director at Saga Studio. He was also a teacher at the film school.

On 21 June 1930 Bang married Ebba Charlotte Valeur (1907-65), with whom he had four children: Lise, Mette, Niels, and Anne.

At Saga Studio in 1943 he met the young photographer Annelise Reenberg; they were married on 10 May 1967.

Bang died in 1967 during the filming of Min søsters børn på bryllupsrejse in Austria. He is buried at Bispebjerg Cemetery.

== Filmography ==
Work	Year	Credit	Notes
Prinsesse Margrethes bryllup	1967	Cinematography	Documentary
Six kids and the honeymooners	1967	Producer	Feature
Six kids and their uncle	1966	Producer	Feature
Een pige og 39 sømænd	1965	Production manager	Feature
En ven i bolignøden	1965	Production manager	Feature
Alt for kvinden	1964	Production manager	Feature
Fräulein Unberührt	1963	Production	Feature
Støv for alle pengene	1963	Direction	Feature
Peters landlov	1963	Production	Feature
Han, hun, Dirch og Dario	1962	Production	Feature
Det støver stadig	1962	Direction	Feature
Operation Venus	1962	Production	Feature
Støv på hjernen	1961	Direction	Feature
Peters baby	1961	Production	Feature
Reptilicus	1961	Direction	Feature
Baronessen fra benzintanken	1960	Production manager	Feature
Kvindelist og kærlighed	1960	Production	Feature
Charles' Aunt	1959	Direction	Feature
Styrmand Karlsen	1958	Production	Feature
Mariannes bryllup	1958	Production	Feature
Erik Scavenius	1958	Direction	Documentary
Tre piger fra Jylland	1957	Production	Feature
Mig og min familie	1957	Production	Feature
Tag til marked i Fjordby	1957	Direction	Feature
Kristiane af Marstal	1956	Production	Feature
Færgekroen	1956	Direction	Feature
Der kom en dag	1955	Production	Feature
Det var på Rundetårn	1955	Direction	Feature
Bruden fra Dragstrup	1955	Production	Feature
Rønne og Neksøs genopbygning	1954	Direction	Documentary
Hendes store aften	1954	Production	Feature
I kongens klæ'r	1954	Direction	Feature
Den gamle mølle på Mols	1953	Production	Feature
Kriminalsagen Tove Andersen	1953	Production	Feature
Ved Kongelunden	1953	Direction	Feature
Rekrut 67 Petersen	1952	Direction	Feature
Fra den gamle købmandsgård	1951	Production	Feature
Fireogtyve timer	1951	Editing	Feature
Hvide sejl	1951	Direction	Documentary
Historien om Hjortholm	1950	Direction	Feature
Behandling af psykisk abnorme lovovertrædere i Herstedvester	1950	Sound	Documentary
Kristinus Bergman	1948	Sound	Feature
Rebildfesten 4. juli 1948	1948	Direction	Documentary
Martin Andersen Nexø	1947	Direction	Documentary
Icebreaking	1947	Direction	Documentary
Training ships	1947	Direction	Documentary
Children of Holland	1946	Direction	Documentary
Diphtheria	1946	Direction	Documentary
Da Freden kom til Danmark	1945	Direction	Documentary
En ny dag gryer	1945	Direction	Feature
Moster fra Mols	1943	Direction	Feature
Kriminalassistent Bloch	1943	Direction	Feature
Afsporet	1942	Sound	Feature
Far skal giftes	1941	Sound	Feature
Niels Pind og hans Dreng	1941	Sound	Feature
Tror du jeg er født i Gaar!	1941	Sound	Feature
Tag til Rønneby Kro	1941	Sound	Feature
Frøken Kirkemus	1941	Sound	Feature
Pas paa Svinget i Solby	1940	Sound	Feature
En Desertør	1940	Sound	Feature
Familien Olsen	1940	Sound	Feature
Västkustens hjältar	1940	Sound	Feature
En ganske almindelig pige	1940	Sound	Feature
Genboerne	1939	Sound	Feature
The People of the Hogbo Farm	1939	Sound	Feature
De tre maaske fire	1939	Sound	Feature
Nordhavets Mænd	1939	Sound	Feature
I Dag begynder Livet	1939	Sound	Feature
Blaavand melder Storm	1938	Sound	Feature
Alarm	1938	Sound	Feature
Den mandlige Husassistent	1938	Sound	Feature
Livet paa Hegnsgaard	1938	Sound	Feature
Julia jubilerar	1938	Sound	Feature
Kloka gubben	1938	Sound	Feature
Svensson ordnar allt!	1938	Sound	Feature
Frk. Møllers Jubilæum	1937	Sound	Feature
En fuldendt Gentleman	1937	Sound	Feature
Den kloge Mand	1937	Sound	Feature
Der var engang en Vicevært	1937	Sound	Feature
Sun over Denmark	1936	Sound	Feature
Cirkus-Revyen	1936	Sound	Feature
De bør forelske Dem	1935	Sound	Feature
Kidnapped	1935	Sound	Feature
Barken Margrethe	1934	Sound	Feature
Palo's wedding	1934	Sound	Feature
Ud i den kolde Sne	1934	Sound	Feature
København, Kalundborg og -?	1934	Sound	Feature
Mit volle Muziek	1933	Sound	Feature
Cinco muchachas	1933	Sound	Feature
Københavnere	1933	Sound	Feature
Pat und Patachon schlagen sich durch	1932	Sound	Feature
