= Børge Møller Grimstrup =

Danish actor

- Born: 15 February 1906; Timring, Denmark
- Died: 30 October 1972 (aged 66); Denmark
- Occupation: Actor
- Years active: 1948-1972

Børge Møller Grimstrup (15 February 1906 – 30 October 1972) was a Danish film actor. He appeared in 26 films between 1948 and 1972. He was born in Timring, Herning Municipality, Denmark and died in Denmark.

== Selected filmography ==
- Hr. Petit (1948)
- Father of Four in the City (1956)
- Flintesønnerne (1956)
- Charles' Aunt (1959)
- Reptilicus (1961)
- Støv på hjernen (1961)
