= Færgekroen =

1956 film

- Directed by: Poul Bang
- Written by: Poul Bang; John Olsen; Paul Sarauw
- Produced by: John Olsen
- Starring: Dirch Passer
- Cinematography: Ole Lytken; Werner Hedmann
- Edited by: Edith Nisted Nielsen
- Music by: Sven Gyldmark
- Production company: Saga Studio
- Release date: 12 October 1956
- Running time: 105 minutes
- Country: Denmark
- Language: Danish

Færgekroen is a 1956 Danish film directed by Poul Bang and starring Dirch Passer.

== Cast ==
- Dirch Passer - Erik Hansen
- Ove Sprogøe - Lars Tofte
- Kjeld Petersen - Jens Ravn
- Lily Broberg - Kamilla
- Poul Müller - Niels Ermandsen
- Else Kornerup - Ebba Ermandsen
- Mimi Heinrich - Susanne Ermandsen
- Henrik Wiehe - Johan Ranggaard
- Buster Larsen - P. Andersen
- Caja Heimann - Michelsen
- Anna Henriques-Nielsen - Christiansen
- Inge Ketti - Marie
- Henry Nielsen - Postbudet
- Carl Johan Hviid - Dyrlægen
- Jørn Grauengaard - Orkesterdirigent
- Inge Østergaard - Refrænsangerinde
- Miskow Makwarth - Auktionarius
- Juditha Barbano - Syngende krogæst (uncredited)
