= Gunnar Bigum =

Danish actor (1914–1983)

- Born: 13 September 1914; Copenhagen, Denmark
- Died: 30 March 1983 (aged 68); Denmark
- Occupation: Actor
- Years active: 1941–1968

Gunnar Bigum (13 September 1914 – 30 March 1983) was a Danish film actor. He appeared in 19 films between 1941 and 1968. He was born in Copenhagen, Denmark and died in Denmark.

== Filmography ==
- Olsen-banden (1968)
- Mig og min lillebror (1967)
- Martha (1967)
- Jeg er sgu min egen (1967)
- Mor bag rattet (1965)
- Halløj i himmelsengen (1965)
- Sommer i Tyrol (1964)
- Alt for kvinden (1964)
- Frøken Nitouche (1963)
- Det støver stadig (1962)
- Støv på hjernen (1961)
- Sjove år, De (1959)
- Kærlighedens melodi (1959)
- Onkel Bill fra New York (1959)
- Mig og min familie (1957)
- Tante Tut fra Paris (1956)
- Den store gavtyv (1956)
- Mod og mandshjerte (1955)
- Alle går rundt og forelsker sig (1941)
