= Rasmus Christiansen (actor) =

Danish actor

- Born: 23 May 1885; Vejlby, Aarhus, Jutland, Denmark
- Died: 25 September 1964 (aged 79); Denmark
- Occupation: Actor
- Years active: 1915-1955

Rasmus Christiansen (23 May 1885 – 25 September 1964) was a Danish film actor. He appeared in 40 films between 1915 and 1955. He was born in Vejlby, Aarhus, Jutland, Denmark and died in Denmark.

== Filmography ==
- Ægteskab og Pigesjov - 1914
- Hovmod staar for Fald - 1915
- Plimsolleren - 1916
- Danserindens Kærlighedsdrøm - 1916
- Je' sku' tale med Jør'nsen - 1917
- De er splittergale - 1919
- David Copperfield - 1922
- Vore venners vinter - 1923
- Byens Don Juan - 1924
- Stamherren - 1925
- Dydsdragonen - 1927
- Laila - 1929
- Vask, videnskab og velvære - 1932
- Nyhavn 17 - 1933
- Nøddebo Præstegård - 1934
- Flight from the Millions - 1934
- Prisoner Number One - 1935
- Min kone er husar - 1935
- Den kloge mand - 1937
- Plat eller krone - 1937
- Kongen bød - 1938
- Den gamle præst - 1939
- Elverhøj (film) - 1939
- Sommerglæder - 1940
- Niels Pind og hans dreng - 1941
- Tordenskjold går i land - 1942
- Alle mand på dæk - 1942
- Søren Søndervold - 1942
- En pige uden lige - 1943
- Moster fra Mols - 1943
- Spurve under taget - 1944
- Lev livet let - 1944
- Besættelse - 1944
- Når katten er ude - 1947
- Røverne fra Rold - 1947
- I de lyse nætter - 1948
- For frihed og ret - 1949
- Susanne - 1950
- Fra den gamle købmandsgård - 1951
- Rekrut 67 Petersen - 1952
- Den gamle mølle på Mols - 1953
- Karen, Maren og Mette - 1954
- Bruden fra Dragstrup - 1955
