= Tag til marked i Fjordby =

1957 film

- Directed by: Poul Bang
- Written by: Peer Guldbrandsen; John Olsen
- Produced by: John Olsen
- Starring: Dirch Passer
- Cinematography: Ole Lytken; Aage Wiltrup
- Edited by: Edith Nisted Nielsen
- Music by: Sven Gyldmark
- Production company: Saga Studio
- Release date: 20 December 1957
- Running time: 94 minutes
- Country: Denmark
- Language: Danish

Tag til marked i Fjordby is a 1957 Danish comedy film directed by Poul Bang and starring Dirch Passer.

== Plot ==
The creepy villain Lasse Larsen has a dangerous hypnotic grip over one of his half-sister lineage, dancer Lillian and forces her — under hypnosis — to commit burglary.

== Cast ==
- Dirch Passer as 'Lange' Emil Andersen
- Ove Sprogøe as Knud Tofte
- Buster Larsen as Lasse Larsen
- Lily Broberg as Gunhild
- Sonja Jensen as Lillian
- Asbjørn Andersen as Varehusdirektør Hallgren
- Paul Hagen as F. I. Duus
- Caja Heimann as Louise Hansen
- Henry Nielsen as Hotelportier
- Vivi Svendsen as Kvindelig butikstyv
- Karl Gustav Ahlefeldt as Mandlig butikstyv
- Bent Vejlby as Roe-Karl
- Carl Johan Hviid as Overbetjent
- Jørgen Weel as Betjent
- Knud Schrøder as Betjent
- Benny Juhlin as Betjent
- Marianne Flor as Sekretær
- Miskow Makwarth as Postmester
