= Povl Wøldike =

Danish actor (1899–1975)

- Born: 13 August 1899; Copenhagen, Denmark
- Died: 25 July 1975 (aged 75); Denmark
- Occupation: Actor
- Years active: 1938–1972

Povl Wøldike (13 August 1899 – 25 July 1975) was a Danish film actor. He appeared in 32 films between 1938 and 1970. He was born in Copenhagen, Denmark and died in Denmark.

== Filmography ==
- Og så er der bal bagefter (1970)
- Hurra for de blå husarer (1970)
- Et godt liv (1970)
- Onkel Joakims hemmelighed (1967)
- Eurydike (1964)
- Støv for alle pengene (1963)
- Pigen og pressefotografen (1963)
- Reptilicus (1961)
- Skibet er ladet med (1960)
- Vi er allesammen tossede (1959)
- Pigen og vandpytten (1958)
- Ung kærlighed (1958)
- Krudt og klunker (1958)
- Far til fire og onkel Sofus (1957)
- Skovridergaarden (1957)
- Bundfald (1957)
- Den kloge mand (1956)
- Sukceskomponisten (1954)
- This Is Life (1953)
- Fløjtespilleren (1953)
- Kærlighedsdoktoren (1952)
- Vores fjerde far (1951)
- Lyn-fotografen (1950)
- Lejlighed til leje (1949)
- Den stjaalne minister (1949)
- Hatten er sat (1947)
- Brevet fra afdøde (1946)
- Frihed, lighed og Louise (1944)
- Det ender med bryllup (1943)
- Forellen (1942)
- Afsporet (1942)
- Den mandlige husassistent (1938)
