= Charles' Aunt =

1959 film

- Directed by: Poul Bang
- Written by: Arvid Müller; Brandon Thomas
- Produced by: John Olsen
- Starring: Dirch Passer
- Cinematography: Ole Lytken
- Edited by: Edith Nisted Nielsen
- Music by: Sven Gyldmark
- Production company: Saga Studio
- Release date: 12 October 1959
- Running time: 101 minutes
- Country: Denmark
- Language: Danish

Charles' Aunt (Danish: Charles' tante) is a 1959 Danish comedy film directed by Poul Bang and starring Dirch Passer. The 101-minute film is based on the 1892 play Charley's Aunt by Brandon Thomas.

== Cast ==
- Dirch Passer as Grev Ditlev Lensby
- Ove Sprogøe as Charles Smith
- Ebbe Langberg as Peter Ahlevig
- Ghita Nørby as Laura Hornemann
- Annie Birgit Garde as Lone Hornemann
- Holger Juul Hansen as Ritmester Frederik Ahlevig
- Birgitte Federspiel as Donna Lucia d'Alvadorez / Lise Holm
- Susse Wold as Henriette
- Hans W. Petersen as Etatsråd Ludvig Lohmann
- Keld Markuslund as Butler Olufsen
- Vivi Svendsen as Kokkepigen Kristine
- Børge Møller Grimstrup as Kusken
