= Karen Marie Løwert =

Danish actress (1914–2002)

- Born: 27 January 1914; Denmark
- Died: 11 February 2002 (aged 88)
- Occupation: Actress
- Years active: 1933–1992

Karen Marie Løwert (27 January 1914 – 11 February 2002) was a Danish actress. She appeared in more than 25 films between 1933 and 1992.

== Selected filmography ==
- Life on the Hegn Farm (1938)
- Wir Wunderkinder (1958)
- Onkel Bill fra New York (1959)
- Once There Was a War (1966)
