= Mogens Brandt =

Danish actor (1909–1970)

- Born: 1 March 1909; Copenhagen, Denmark
- Died: 21 January 1970 (aged 60); Denmark
- Occupation: Actor
- Years active: 1944–1969

Mogens Brandt (1 March 1909 – 21 January 1970) was a Danish film actor. He appeared in 33 films between 1944 and 1969. He was born in Copenhagen, Denmark and died in Denmark.

== Filmography ==
- Mordets melodi – 1944
- De tre skolekammerater – 1944
- De røde enge – 1945
- I går og i morgen – 1945
- Far betaler – 1946
- The Swedenhielm Family – 1947
- Kristinus Bergman – 1948
- Tre år efter – 1948
- Det var på Rundetårn – 1955
- Den store gavtyv – 1956
- Hidden Fear – 1957
- Skarpe skud i Nyhavn – 1957
- Seksdagesløbet – 1958
- Krudt og klunker – 1958
- Vi er allesammen tossede – 1959
- Skibet er ladet med – 1960
- Soldaterkammerater på vagt – 1960
- Panik i paradis – 1960
- Peters baby – 1961
- Reptilicus – 1961
- Soldaterkammerater på efterårsmanøvre – 1961
- Cirkus Buster – 1961
- Prinsesse for en dag – 1962
- Ih, du forbarmende – 1964
- Mord for åbent tæppe – 1964
- Når enden er go' – 1964
- Pigen og millionæren – 1965
- Mor bag rattet – 1965
- Det er ikke appelsiner – det er heste – 1967
- Elsk din næste – 1967
- Nyhavns glade gutter – 1967
- Fup eller fakta – 1967
- Dyrlægens plejebørn – 1968
- Mig og min lillebror og storsmuglerne – 1968
- Sonja – 16 år – 1969
