= Bodil Steen =

Danish actress

- Born: 14 January 1923; Copenhagen, Denmark
- Died: 10 January 1979 (aged 55); Frederiksberg, Denmark

Bodil Jørri Jensen Steen (14 January 1923 – 10 January 1979) was a Danish stage and film actress.

== Filmography ==
Year	Title	Role	Notes
1939	I dag begynder livet	Karin Sommer	
1941	Tror du jeg er født i går?	Frk. Johanne Solberg	
1947	Når katten er ude	Kontordame	
1949	Det hændte i København	Bebs	
1950	Op og ned langs kysten	Fru Holgersen	
1954	Hendes store aften	Frk. Lilly	
1954	I kongens klær	Oline Poulsen	
1954	Vores lille by	Ghita	
1955	Min datter Nelly	Lotte Jørgensen	
1955	Det var på Rundetårn	Hans kone, Kirsten	
1956	Hvad vil De ha'?	Kvinde på besøg på hospital	
1956	Taxa K-1640 Efterlyses	Taxakunde	
1957	Lån mig din kone	Henriette Flint	
1958	Det lille hotel	Agnes-Catrine	
1958	Pigen og vandpytten	Baronesse Grunenskjold	
1962	Han, hun, Dirch og Dario	Jenny	
1962	Crazy Paradise	Minister Bertha Viginius	
1962	Rikki og mændene	Dorte	
1963	Pigen og pressefotografen	Charlotte Kristiansen	
1964	Slottet	Husholderske Madsen	
1965	Sytten	Jacob's Aunt	
1965	Pigen og millionæren	Conny	
1965	Mor bag rattet	Baronesse Lulu von Baunenfeldt	
1966	Dyden går amok	Andrea	
1966	Soyas tagsten	Irmelin Mødon, hans kollega	
1967	Historien om Barbara		
1967	Min kones ferie	Fru Maria	
1978	Lille spejl	Restaurationsgæst	(final film role)
