= Søren Elung Jensen =

Danish actor (1928–2017)

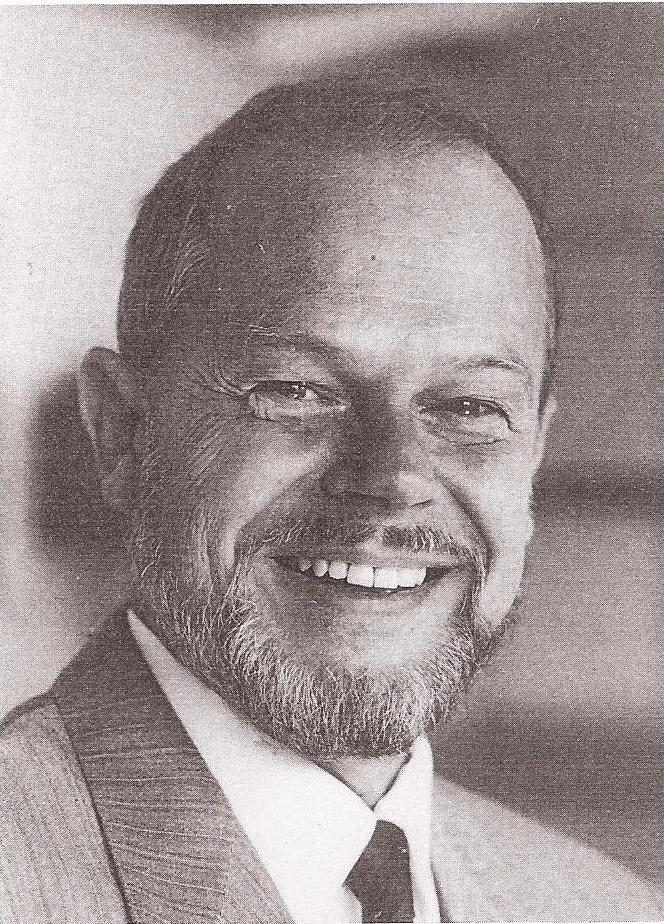
- Born: 7 July 1928; Odense, Denmark
- Died: 22 January 2017 (aged 88); Hellerup, Denmark
- Other name: Søren Elung
- Occupation: Actor
- Years active: 1960–1999

Søren Elung Jensen (7 July 1928 – 22 January 2017) was a Danish film actor. He appeared in 22 films between 1960 and 1999. He was born in Odense. He died from lung cancer on 22 January 2017 in Hellerup. He was 88.

== Filmography ==
- Besat (1999)
- Manden som ikke ville dø (1999)
- Hvor er Ulla Katrine? (1974)
- Faderen (1974)
- TV-stykket (1974)
- Den levende vare (1972)
- Dukkens død (1972)
- Hotel Paradiso (1972)
- Kommunisten (1971)
- Hjemme hos William (1971)
- King Lear (1971)
- Mordskab (1969)
- Tænk på et tal (1969)
- Farvel Thomas (1968)
- Tine (1964)
- Støv for alle pengene (1963)
- Det støver stadig (1962)
- Den rige enke (1962)
- Flemming på kostskole (1961)
- Støv på hjernen (1961)
- Sorte Shara (1961)
- Kærlighed (1960)
