= Beatrice Palner =

Danish actress (1938–2013)

- Born: 31 January 1938; Helsingør, Denmark
- Died: 4 April 2013 (aged 75)
- Occupation: Actress
- Years active: 1961-1989

Beatrice Palner (31 January 1938 – 4 April 2013) was a Danish film actress. She appeared in 21 films between 1961 and 1989. She was born in Helsingør, Denmark.

== Selected filmography ==
- Støv på hjernen (1961)
- Det støver stadig (1962)
- Frøken Nitouche (1963)
- Støv for alle pengene (1963)
- Passer passer piger (1965)
- Terror (1977)
