= Han, hun, Dirch og Dario =

1962 film

Han, Hun, Dirch og Dario
- Directed by: Annelise Reenberg
- Written by: Børge Müller
- Produced by: Poul Bang
- Starring: Ghita Nørby
- Cinematography: Ole Lytken
- Edited by: Lizzi Weischenfeldt
- Production company: Saga Studios
- Release date: 23 March 1962
- Running time: 106 minutes
- Country: Denmark
- Languages: Danish; Italian

Han, Hun, Dirch og Dario (transl. He, She, Dirch and Dario) is a 1962 Danish comedy film directed by Annelise Reenberg and starring Ghita Nørby and Ebbe Langberg.

The story follows Poul Borg who neglects his beautiful, young wife Marianne, even forgetting their wedding day, in favor of a new, fast sports car, a beautiful silver-gray Jaguar. During his drive, he runs out of gas. A young lady Laura Lublinski helps him.

== Cast ==
- Ghita Nørby - Marianne Borg
- Ebbe Langberg - Poul Borg
- Dirch Passer - Eigil Hansen
- Dario Campeotto - Mario
- Gitte Hænning - Dorte
- Bodil Steen - Jenny
- Hanne Borchsenius - Laura Lublinski
- Sigrid Horne-Rasmussen - Fru Frederiksen
- Edouard Mielche - Musikprofessor Harald Lublinski
- Gabriel Axel - Modedesigneren Monsieur Baptiste
- Asbjørn Andersen - Teaterdirektør Thomsen
- Axel Strøbye - Henry
- Bjørn Puggaard-Müller - Scenograf Petersen
