= Kid Gang on the Go =

1971 film

- Directed by: Annelise Reenberg
- Written by: Annelise Reenberg
- Produced by: Leif Jul; H. P. Møller; Anita Rasmussen
- Starring: William Rosenberg
- Cinematography: Mikael Salomon
- Edited by: Lizzi Weischenfeldt
- Music by: Sven Gyldmark
- Production company: Saga Studio
- Release date: 15 October 1971
- Running time: 105 minutes
- Country: Denmark
- Language: Danish

Kid Gang on the Go (Danish: Min søsters børn når de er værst [lit. My sister's worst moments]) is a 1971 Danish comedy film directed by Annelise Reenberg and starring William Rosenberg. This was Reenberg's last film, since she retired in 1972.

It's the last instalment in a film series of 4.

== Cast ==
- William Rosenberg as Peter Berg
- Jeanne Darville as Else Berg
- Sonja Oppenhagen as Rikke Berg
- Jan Priiskorn-Schmidt as Jan Berg
- Vibeke Houlberg as Lotte Berg
- Michael Rosenberg as Michael Berg
- Pusle Helmuth as Pusle Berg
- Lars Madsen as Blop
- Katrine Salomon as Lille Mulle
- Ditte Søndergaard as Lille Bøtte
- Axel Strøbye as Onkel Erik Lund
- Sigrid Horne-Rasmussen as Fru Jensen
- Judy Gringer as Camilla Olsen
- Karl Stegger as Advokat Andersen
- Thecla Boesen as Edel Andersen
- Niels Hinrichsen as Niels
- Dirch Passer as Viggo
- Jørgen Kiil as René
- Ernst Meyer as Egon
- Preben Mahrt as Havnefoged
- Jens Østerholm as Svensk politimand

== Reception ==
Retrospective commentators praised the acting and the direction of child actors in the film.
