= Saga Studios =

Danish film-production company

Saga Film A/S
- Industry: Film production
- Founded: 1942; 84 years ago
- Founder: John Olsen
- Defunct: 1976
- Headquarters: Denmark

Saga Studio (or Saga Film A/S) was a film production company in Denmark founded by John Olsen. The company existed from 1942 to 1976.

== History ==
Several years after Olsen co-founded ASA Film Studio with Lau Lauritzen Jr. and Henning Karmark, there was a falling out between the partners over financial issues. Olsen took his interests and opened Saga Studio as a separate company in 1942, which included a film studio, film rental business and the Saga Cinema, becoming the fourth-largest film production company in Denmark; it was known for its comedy films. Poul Bang, brother of Bang & Olufsen founder Peter Bang, worked as a production manager and director for the studio.

More than 80 films were produced by the studio from 1942 through 1974. Some of its most successful films were the popular comedies of Danish comedian Dirch Passer.

== Filmography ==
- Moster fra Mols (1943)
- Flyv fugl, flyv (1943)
- Kriminalassistent Bloch (1943)
- Spurve under taget (1944)
- Lev livet let (1944)
- To som elsker hinanden (1944)
- Vikinger (1945)
- En ny dag gryer (1945)
- Hollands børn (1946)
- Difteri (1946)
- Oktoberroser (1946)
- Op med lille Martha (1946)
- Sikken en nat (1947)
- Soldaten og Jenny (1947)
- I de lyse nætter (1948)
- Mens porten var lukket (1948)
- John and Irene (1949)
- Det hændte i København (1949)
- Op og ned langs kysten (1950)
- Historien om Hjortholm (1950)
- Unge piger forsvinder i København (1951)
- Fra den gamle Købmandsgaard (1951)
- Lyntoget (1951)
- 24 timer (1951)
- Rekrut 67, Petersen (1952)
- Den gamle mølle paa Mols (1953)
- Kriminalsagen Tove Andersen (1953)
- Ved Kongelunden (1953)
- Der kom en dag (1955)
- I kongens klæ'r (1954)
- Hendes store aften (1954)
- Det var paa Rundetaarn (1955)
- Bruden fra Dragstrup (1955)
- Kristiane af Marstal (1956)
- Færgekroen (1956)
- Tag til marked i Fjordby (1957)
- Me and My Family (1957)
- Tre piger fra Jylland (1957)
- Henrik Hauch (1957)
- Styrmand Karlsen (1958)
- Lyssky transport gennem Danmark (1958)
- Mariannes bryllup (1958)
- Charles' Aunt (1959)
- Soldaterkammerater rykker ud (1959)
- Onkel Bill fra New York (1959)
- Skibet er ladet med (1960)
- Baronessen fra benzintanken (1960)
- Kvindelist og kærlighed (1960)
- Støv på hjernen (1961)
- Peters baby (1961)
- Løgn og løvebrøl (1961)
- Reptilicus (1961)
- Venus fra Vestø (1962)
- Det støver stadig (1962)
- Det stod i avisen (1962)
- Han, Hun, Dirch og Dario (1962)
- Lykkens musikanter (1962)
- Støv for alle pengene (1963)
- Frøken Nitouche (1963)
- Fem mand og Rosa (1964)
- Alt for kvinden (1964)
- Een pige og 39 sømænd (1965)
- Passer passer piger (1965)
- En ven i bolignøden (1965)
- Six Kids and Their Uncle (1966)
- Old Maids (1966)
- Dyden går amok (1966)
- Six Kids and the Honeymooners (1967)
- Pretty Boy and Rosa (1967)
- Magic in Town (1968)
- I Love Blue (1968)
- A Whiff of Sunshine (1969)
- I'll Take Happiness (1969)
- Jazz All Around (1969)
- The Performance Will Be Followed by a Dance (1970)
- Hooray for the Blue Hussars (1970)
- Kid Gang on the Go (1971)
- Mig og mafiaen (1973)
- Up and at 'Em, Amalie (1973)
- Me, Too, in the Mafia (1974)
