= Fire høytider =

2000 Norwegian television mini-series

- Genre: Drama
- Written by: Leidulv Risan; Bjørn Skaar
- Directed by: Leidulv Risan
- Starring: Erik Ulfsby; Ane Dahl Torp; Linn Skåber; Martin Hestbæk; Jan Ø. Wiig
- Country of origin: Norway
- Original language: Norwegian
- No. of episodes: 5

Production
- Running time: 50 min
- Production company: NRK Drama

Original release
- Network: NRK
- Release: 13 November 2000

Fire høytider is a Norwegian television mini-series directed by Leidulv Risan that originally aired on Norwegian TV channel NRK1 in 2000.

The series consisted of five episodes where each episode dealt with an ethical dilemma.

== Selected cast ==
- Erik Ulfsby
- Ane Dahl Torp
- Linn Skåber
- Jan Ø. Wiig
- Petronella Barker
- Kim Haugen
- Mads Ousdal
- Susan Badrkhan
- Alf Nordvang
- Ghita Nørby
- Marianne Krogh
- Paul Ottar Haga
