= Reptilicus =

1961 Danish monster film

- Danish theatrical release poster
- Directed by: Danish version: Poul Bang; English version: Sidney W. Pink
- Written by: Ib Melchior; Sidney W. Pink
- Starring: Carl Ottosen; Ann Smyrner; Mimi Heinrich; Dirch Passer
- Cinematography: Aage Wiltrup
- Edited by: Sven Methling; Edith Nisted Nielsen
- Music by: Sven Gyldmark
- Production company: Saga Studios
- Distributed by: American International Pictures (USA); Saga Studios (Denmark)
- Release dates: February 20, 1961; (Denmark); 1962 (United States)
- Running time: 94 minutes (Denmark), 81 minutes (USA)
- Countries: Denmark; United States
- Languages: Danish; English
- Budget: $233,000 (Note: The Danish version cost $133,000, while the American version cost an additional $100,000.)
- Box office: $800,000

Reptilicus is the mutual title of two monster films about a giant, prehistoric reptile. A pair of Danish-American co-productions produced by Cinemagic and Saga Studio, the Danish-language Reptilicus was directed by Poul Bang and released by Saga in Denmark in 1961, while the English-language Reptilicus was directed and co-written by Sidney Pink and released by American International Pictures in the United States in 1962. They have frequently been incorrectly described as two release-versions of the same film.

"In every film reference book published over the past four decades, the Danish-American monster-movie Reptilicus is listed as one film, and one film only. However, in spite of sharing an identical plot, identical sets and locations, a nearly identical cast and crew, as well as overlapping use of some shots, Reptilicus is in fact two distinct films, shot in separate languages by two directors, very much in the manner of the American/Spanish versions of Universal's 1931 Dracula."

— Nicolas Barbano: Twice Told Tails – The Two Versions of Reptilicus in Video Watchdog #96, 2003

== Plot ==
Danish miner Svend Viltorft digs up a section of a giant reptile's tail from the frozen grounds in Lapland, where he and other miners are drilling. The section is flown to the Denmark's Aquarium in Copenhagen, where it is preserved in a cold room for scientific study. But due to mishandling, the room is left open and the section begins to thaw, only for scientists to find that it is starting to regenerate.

Professor Otto Martens, who is in charge of the aquarium, dubs the reptilian species "Reptilicus" (upon a reporter's suggestion) and compares its regeneration abilities to that of other animals like planarians and starfishes.

Once fully regenerated from the tail section, Reptilicus goes on an unstoppable rampage from the Danish countryside to the panic-stricken streets of Copenhagen (including one of its famous landmarks, Langebro Bridge). The monster is finally rendered unconscious by a sedative developed by ingenious scientists and shot into its mouth from a bazooka fired by Brigadier General Grayson.

However, the film is left open-ended. A final shot shows one of Reptilicus' legs, which had been blown off earlier by the Danish Navy's depth charges, beginning to move on its own, raising the possibility that it is starting to regenerate into a new Reptilicus.

== Cast ==
- Carl Ottosen as Brigadier General Mark Grayson
- Ann Smyrner as Lise Martens
- Mimi Heinrich as Karen Martens
- Asbjørn Andersen as Professor Otto Martens
- Bodil Miller as Connie Miller (Danish version)
- Marla Behrens as Connie Miller (American version)
- Bent Mejding as Svend Viltorft
- Povl Wøldike as Dr. Peter Dalby
- Dirch Passer as Peterson (Dirk Mikkelsen in the Danish version)
- Ole Wisborg as Captain Brandt
- Mogens Brandt as Police Chief Hassing
- Kjeld Petersen as Police Officer Olsen
- Alfred Wilken as Commander Vanggaard
- Poul Thomsen as Captain Naval
- Claus Toksvig as himself
- Birthe Wilke as herself
- Alex Suhr as Alex
- Bent Vejlby as Brandt's Driver
- Børge Møller Grimstrup as Farmer
- Dirk Melchior as Farmer Eaten by Reptilicus

== Production ==
Production of the two films started in July 1960. They were shot simultaneously, one directed by Danish director Poul Bang and filmed in Danish language, the other directed by American producer-director Sidney Pink and filmed in English language with an almost identical cast. Pink and Bang took turns throughout each shooting day, so that Pink would direct and film a shot in English, after which Bang would direct and film the same shot in Danish.

The only difference in the cast of the two films is UNESCO representative Connie Miller, played by Danish actress Bodil Miller in Bang's Danish-language film and, because the latter could not speak English, by German actress Marla Behrens in Pink's English-language film. Filming took place in several locations in Denmark, including Sjælland (especially Copenhagen) and Jylland.

The Danish-language film directed by Poul Bang was completed swiftly and released in Denmark on February 25, 1961.

Following delivery of his negative to American International Pictures, Pink's film was deemed virtually unreleasable and had to be extensively reworked by the film's Danish-American screenwriter, Ib Melchior. This included altering footage to show Reptilicus vomiting acid saliva; the Danish actors' voices (speaking English with Danish accents) were dubbed over by mainly American actors (and in several cases by Melchior himself).

Pink was angry at the changes and wound up in a legal dispute with AIP. After Pink and others viewed Melchior's new version, however, the lawsuit was dropped and it is this version that was finally released in the United States in 1962.

=== Pink & Denmark ===
Sidney Pink produced four films in Denmark: The Greeneyed Elephant, Journey to the Seventh Planet and the two Reptilicus-films. Following his return to Hollywood, he praised Denmark and Danish filmmaking, including the Danish miniatures, saying that "Danish miniature work has surpassed that of Japan, up to generally acknowledged to be the finest in the world. Facilities in Denmark, by Hollywood standards, are notably lacking; but fine craftsmen who put everything together by hand are not concerned with the time it takes, (and) are excellent". Pink also said "the Scandinavian countries have never truly been exploited by Hollywood filmmakers, so the settings have remained unusually fresh ground for motion pictures. Reptilicus at Saga Studios in Copenhagen made "at a cost of $380,000 (equivalent to $4,135,546 in 2025), about a third of what it probably would have cost if made in the U. S." In response to the box office success of Godzilla in 1998, in 2001 Pink attempted to produce a remake of Reptilicus.

== Release ==
=== Theatrical release ===
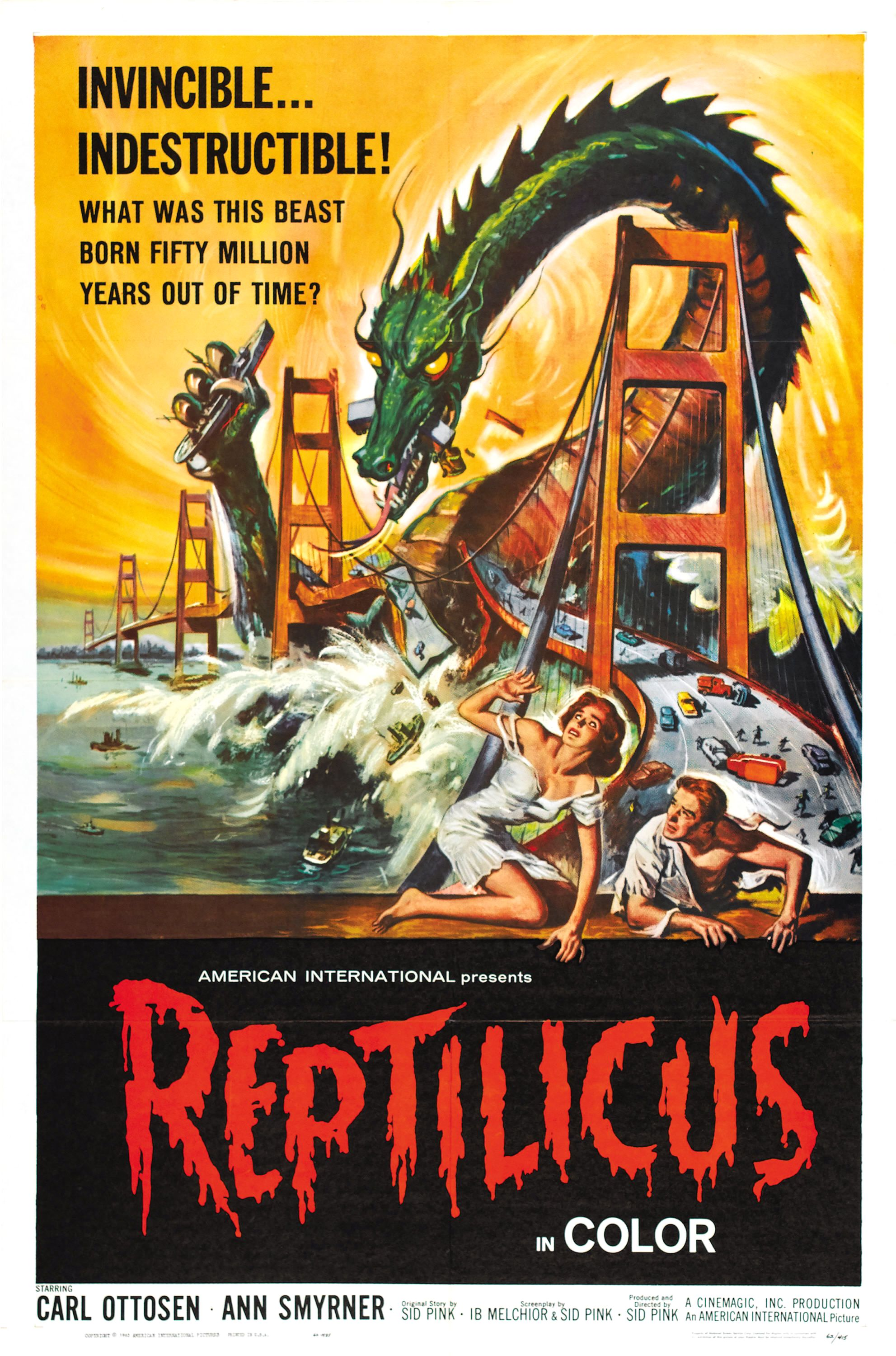
American theatrical release poster by Reynold Brown.

The Danish-language Reptilicus directed by Poul Bang was released in Denmark on February 25, 1961. The English-language Reptilicus directed by Sidney Pink and reworked by Ib Melchior was released in the US in late 1962.

=== Home media ===
Poul Bang's Danish-language Reptilicus was released in Denmark on Betamax and VHS from Video Action as Rædselsuhyret, on VHS from Video International as Dus med uhyret, in 1994 on VHS from Sandrew Metronome as Reptilicus, and in 2002 on DVD from Sandrew Metronome as Reptilicus. In 2019, the Swedish company Studio S released Poul Bang's Reptilicus on a DVD that as a bonus feature included Sidney Pink's English-language Reptilicus (both films in incorrect 4:3-ratio).

Sidney Pink's English-language Reptilicus was released on VHS in 1994 by Orion Home Video, and on DVD on April 1, 2003, by MGM Home Entertainment under the Midnite Movies banner. In June 2015, it was released in the Blu-ray format by Scream Factory as a double feature with the 1977 film Tentacles. In July 2024, it was released as 4K Blu-ray from Vinegar Syndrome, with Poul Bang's Danish-language Reptilicus included among several bonus-features in this three-disc set.

== Critical response ==
=== Danish-language version ===
Upon its theatrical release in 1961, Poul Bang's Danish-language Reptilicus received negative reviews by the Danish film critics. However, as Denmark's only giant monster film, it has since achieved a cult following in its home country.

Film critic Glenn Erickson described the monster as "a wiggly marionette that moved like something from Kukla, Fran and Ollie," that the film's "dubbing was terrible and the optical effects so distractingly bad that I couldn't help but roll my eyes," that the film includes "a jaw-droppingly dreadful musical number, in which bumbling aquarium janitor Mikkelsen / Petersen (Dirch Passer) romps in a park with a bunch of barely-interested kids, singing a horrible song about a loveable monster," and that the film "comes in dead last in the list of movies where giant monsters attack cities." Describing the film as a "hilarious sci-fi mess," critic Hans Wollstein further noted in AllMovie that it "contains filmdom's perhaps least convincing monster and some of the worst performances imaginable," that "Ottosen's wooden performance is second only to that of Bodil Miller, a former Universal starlet who appears here for no apparent reason," and "a low point of the film is pop star Birthe Wilke's rendition of a ditty, 'Tivoli Nights', to a visibly dazed audience."

=== English-language version ===
American theatrical trailer

Released in 1962, almost two years later than Poul Bang's Danish-language Reptilicus, Sidney Pink's English-language Reptilicus received mostly negative reviews from American critics. On Rotten Tomatoes, the film holds an approval rating of 25% based on eight reviews, with a weighted average rating of 3.9/10. Author and film critic Leonard Maltin awarded the film a BOMB, his lowest rating for a film. In his review of the film, Maltin wrote that the film was "only good for laughs as [the] script hits every conceivable monster-movie cliché, right to the final shot". TV Guide gave the film one out of a possible four stars, calling it "a fair-to-poor monster film".

Writing in DVD Talk about Scream Factory's Blu-ray release, Kurt Dahlke reported that "Reptilicus seems aimed squarely at the monster kids in the audience," that no viewers "will concern themselves with the plot," and that "Special Effects are not this movie's strong point, but they are its selling point," with a monster that "often slithers about slowly, like an arthritic hand-puppet." Reviewing the same release, Matt Brunson from Creative Loafing also gave the film a negative review: "The effects used to create Reptilicus (a puppet, basically) are no worse than those seen in many of the era's films (it still beats the oversized bird in The Giant Claw, for starters), but the effects employed when the creature does something like munch on humans or shoot acidic green slime from its mouth manage to travel beyond atrocious. [...] Awkward dubbing of foreign actors, special effects that look like they cost a buck fifty, laughably earnest dialogue, wince-inducing comic relief from a dim-witted character — if ever a movie was made that deserved to be showcased on the cult series Mystery Science Theater 3000 it's this one".

=== Comparisons ===
Kip Doto's book Reptilicus: The Screenplay (1999) was the first publication to attempt a listing of the main differences between Poul Bang's Danish-language Reptilicus and Sidney Pink's English-language Reptilicus. This was followed by a critical comparison of the two films in Video Watchdog #96, 2003, noting that "almost every time the camera placement and editing differs between the two films, Pink emerges as a better filmmaker than Poul Bang. Pink's camera tends to be part of the drama, while Bang's camera is a distant, bored observer, typical of Danish cinema at that time.".

== Novel, comic book and stage adaptations ==
A novelization of the film was released in paperback at the time of its original release (Reptilicus by Dean Owen (real name: Dudley Dean McGaughey) (Monarch Books 1961)).

In 1961, Charlton Comics produced a comic book based on the film. Reptilicus lasted two issues. After the license had lapsed, Charlton modified the creature's look and renamed it Reptisaurus. The series was renamed Reptisaurus the Terrible and would continue from issue #3 before being cancelled with issue #8 in 1962. This was followed by a one-shot called Reptisaurus Special Edition in 1963. Reptisaurus also made a cameo in the 12th issue of another Charlton giant monster comic, Gorgo.

In 2009, The Asylum would produce a Reptisaurus television film for SyFy.

In 2012, Scary Monsters Magazine reprinted the Reptisaurus the Terrible series as a black and white collection called Scarysaurus the Scary.

In 2020, PS Artbooks published the two issues of Reptilicus as a bonus in the first two volumes of their Kona, Monarch of Monster Isle trade paperback series.

On April 25, 2010, Reptilicus was performed as an experimental stage play at Skuespilhusets Portscene in central Copenhagen, a co-production between Eventministeriet and CPH PIX. Titled Reptilicus Live, this adaptation was directed by Line Paulsen with all roles performed by Troels Thorsen, Johannes Lilleøre, Martin Greis, Jeanette Lindbæk Larsen and Signe Egholm Olsen, plus an uncredited puppeteer portraying the monster by moving a shadow puppet. Theatre critic Jens Østergaard wrote in KultuNaut, April 26, 2010: "Not since Turbotown in Turbinehallerne has the audience cheered and laughed so enthusiastically at one of the Royal Theatre's stages. Reptilicus is wacky and brilliant entertainment, performed with great love for the old Danish monster movie."
