= Jørgen Reenberg =

Danish actor (1927–2023)

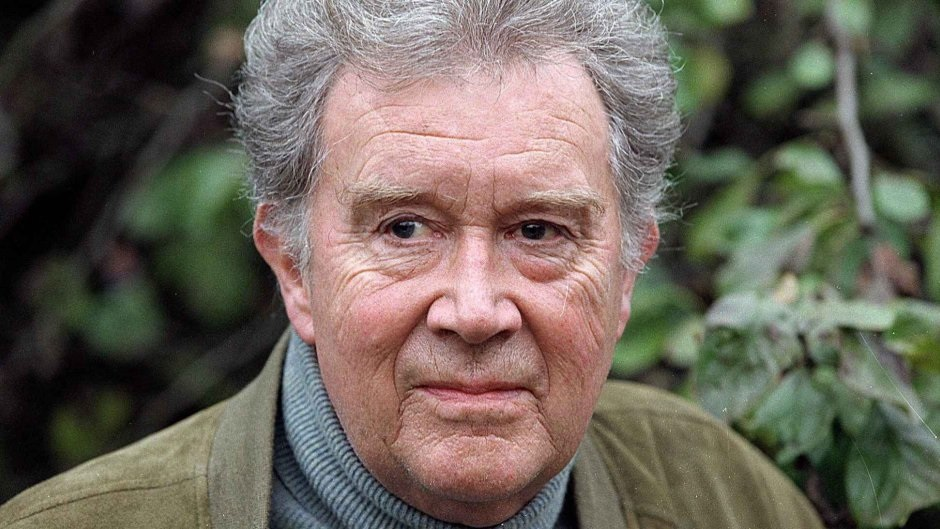
- Born: 8 November 1927; Frederiksberg, Denmark
- Died: 9 November 2023 (aged 96)
- Occupation: Actor
- Years active: 1948–2006

Jørgen Reenberg (8 November 1927 – 9 November 2023) was a Danish stage and film actor. He appeared in 30 films from 1948 onwards. He was the brother of Danish film director Annelise Reenberg.

He made his film debut in Three Years Later from 1948 and his last film was I Am Dina from 2002. He worked at the Royal Theatre. He played such diverse roles as Horace in The School for Women (Molière), Albert Ebbesen in Elverhøj (Heiberg), Meyer and Old Levin in Within the Walls (Nathansen) and the Admiral in H.M.S. Pinafore (Gilbert and Sullivan).

He received a Reumert for Best Male Lead in 2006, alternating between Levin and Meyer in Inside the Walls at the Royal Theatre in 2005.

== Selected filmography ==
- We Want a Child! (1949)
- I gabestokken (1950)
- Fodboldpræsten (1951)
- Father of Four (1953)
- Be Dear to Me (1957)
- Krudt og klunker (1958)
- Skibet er ladet med (1960)
- Tine (1964)
- Europa (1991)
