= Kate Mundt =

Danish actress (1930–2004)

- Born: 9 January 1930; Denmark
- Died: 5 May 2004 (aged 74); Denmark
- Occupation: Actress
- Years active: 1951–1978

Kate Mundt (9 January 1930 – 5 May 2004) was a Danish film actress. She appeared in 20 films between 1951 and 1978. She was born and died in Denmark.

== Filmography ==
- Agent 69 Jensen i Skyttens tegn (1978)
- Agent 69 Jensen i Skorpionens tegn (1977)
- Hopla på sengekanten (1976)
- I Tvillingernes tegn (1975)
- Justine och Juliette (1975)
- I Tyrens tegn (1974)
- Romantik på sengekanten (1973)
- Tandlæge på sengekanten (1971)
- Rend mig i revolutionen (1970)
- Ta' lidt solskin (1969)
- Jag en kvinna, II - äktenskapet (1968)
- Der kom en dag (1955)
- Kongeligt besøg (1954)
- Sønnen (1953)
- Ved kongelunden... (1953)
- Kampen mod tuberkulosen (1953)
- Rekrut 67, Petersen (1952)
- Unge piger forsvinder i København (1951)
- Glem det aldrig (1951)
