= Onkel Bill fra New York =

1959 film

- Directed by: Peer Guldbrandsen
- Written by: Peer Guldbrandsen; John Olsen
- Produced by: Erik Larsen; John Olsen
- Starring: Dirch Passer
- Cinematography: Aage Wiltrup
- Edited by: Edith Nisted Nielsen
- Music by: Sven Gyldmark
- Production company: Saga Studio
- Release date: 17 July 1959
- Running time: 90 minutes
- Country: Denmark
- Language: Danish

Onkel Bill fra New York (English: Uncle Bill from New York) is a 1959 Danish comedy film directed by Peer Guldbrandsen and starring Dirch Passer.

== Cast ==
- Dirch Passer as Hans Høj
- Helle Virkner as Susanne Høj
- Ove Sprogøe as Johnny Jensen
- Ulla Lock as Kate
- Emil Hass Christensen as Uncle Bill
- Karen Marie Løwert as Helga (Nuser / Svigermor)
- Judy Gringer as Frk. Jytte
- Annette Post as Frk. Hanne
- Aage Winther-Jørgensen as Valdemar
- Victor Cornelius as The Pianist
- Gunnar Bigum as Conference Speaker
