= Ulla Lock =

Danish actress (1934–2012)

- Born: 19 April 1934; Copenhagen, Denmark
- Died: 20 September 2012 (aged 78); Aarhus, Denmark
- Occupation: Actress
- Years active: 1953-1978

Ulla Lock (19 April 1934 – 20 September 2012) was a Danish film actress who was born in Copenhagen. She appeared in 19 films between 1953 and 1978.

== Filmography ==
- Slægten (1978)
- Man sku være noget ved musikken (1972)
- Tjærehandleren (1971)
- Erotik (1971)
- De usynlige (1970)
- Farvel Thomas (1968)
- Billet til månen (1967)
- Tegneserie (1967)
- Vi voksne (1963)
- Lykkens musikanter (1962)
- Baronessen fra benzintanken (1960)
- Kvindelist og kærlighed (1960)
- Jomfruburet (1959)
- Onkel Bill fra New York (1959)
- Tre piger fra Jylland (1957)
- Der var engang en gade (1957)
- Den kloge mand (1956)
- Det er så yndigt at følges ad (1954)
- Min søn Peter (1953)
