= I kongens klæ'r (1954 film) =

1954 Danish film

- Directed by: Poul Bang
- Written by: John Olsen
- Produced by: John Olsen
- Starring: Dirch Passer
- Cinematography: Kjeld Arnholtz; Jørgen Christian Jensen
- Edited by: Anker Sørensen
- Music by: Sven Gyldmark
- Production company: Saga Studio
- Release date: 24 September 1954
- Running time: 101 minutes
- Country: Denmark
- Language: Danish

I kongens klæ'r is a 1954 Danish comedy film directed by Poul Bang and starring Dirch Passer.

In this 101-minute film, warehouse manager Johan Petersen discovers drugs hidden in a shipment.

== Cast ==
- Dirch Passer as Søren Rask - rekrut 66
- Ove Sprogøe as Jens Rasmussen - rekrut 65
- Kjeld Petersen as Grosserer Johan Petersen / 67
- Bodil Steen as Oline Poulsen
- Louis Miehe-Renard as Premierløjtnant Henrik Grøn
- Elsebet Knudsen as Elsebet Petersen
- Erni Arneson as Fru Petersen
- Buster Larsen as Nikolaj Hansen
- Arthur Jensen as Jens Hik
- Ib Schønberg as Jensen
- Paul Hagen as Gadebetjent
- Karl Stegger as Fængselsbetjent
- Ole Monty as Militærlægen
- Axel Strøbye as Sergent Thorvald Rønne
- Gyrd Løfquist as Politibetjent Høegh
- Carl Johan Hviid as Overbetjent Schmidt
- Caja Heimann as Frk. Hansen
- Carl Ottosen as Tolder
- Ib Fürst as Tolder
- Margrethe Nielsen as Kontordame
- Mogens Juul as Skildvagt
- Poul Clemmensen as Betjent
- Bjørn Puggaard-Müller as Betjent
- Henry Nielsen as Overbetjent Peter Kvist
