= Støv på hjernen (1961 film) =

1961 film

- Directed by: Poul Bang
- Written by: Arvid Müller; Eva Ramm; Aage Stentoft; Øyvind Vennerød
- Starring: Helle Virkner
- Cinematography: Ole Lytken; Aage Wiltrup
- Edited by: Edith Nisted Nielsen
- Music by: Sven Gyldmark
- Production company: Saga Studio
- Release date: 11 October 1961
- Running time: 104 minutes
- Country: Denmark
- Language: Danish

Støv på hjernen is a 1961 Danish film directed by Poul Bang and starring Helle Virkner. It is a remake of the 1959 Norwegian film Støv på hjernen.

== Plot ==
The film follows a group of people in the fictional housing estate Solvænget at Lykkevej 2.

== Cast ==
- Helle Virkner as Fru Bodil Henriksen
- Søren Elung Jensen as Hr. Arne Henriksen
- Dirch Passer as Alf Thomsen
- Hanne Borchsenius as Frk. Monalisa Jacobsen
- Bodil Udsen as Fru Rigmor Hansen
- Ove Sprogøe as Hr. Thorbjørn Hansen
- Karin Nellemose as Fru Birthe Mynster
- Emil Hass Christensen as Hr. Mogens Mynster
- Beatrice Palner as Fru Lene Svendsen
- Henning Palner as Hr. Viggo Svendsen
- Paul Hagen as Sælgeren
- Karl Stegger as Hr. Tim Feddersen
- Ingrid Langballe as Fru Bolette Feddersen
- Else Kornerup as Sælger ved husmodermøde
- Kitty Beneke as Fru Kristoffersen
- Børge Møller Grimstrup as Mand der vil have stilhed
- Miskow Makwarth as Gæst hos Mynster
- Bjørn PuggaardasMüller as Bibliotekar
- Gunnar Lemvigh as Repræsentant fra 'Pral'
- Gunnar Bigum as Scooter forhandler
- Jan PriiskornasSchmidt as Claus Henriksen
- Ralf Dujardin as Thomas Henriksen
- Edith Hermansen as Hustru til mand, der vil have stilhed
- Alex Suhr as Taxaaschauffør
- Klaus Nielsen as Gæst hos Mynster

== Production ==
Voldfløjen 2-4 in Husum, a suburb of Copenhagen, was used as location for the scenes at Solvænget. The real building has no dormers, the one seen in the film where Monalisa Jacobsen (Hanne Borchsenius) lives is based on studio recordings.
