= Caja Heimann =

Danish actress (1918–1988)

- Born: 7 December 1918; Copenhagen, Denmark
- Died: 12 August 1988 (aged 69); Denmark
- Occupation: Actress
- Years active: 1940–1980

Caja Heimann (7 December 1918 – 12 August 1988) was a Danish film actress. She appeared in 23 films between 1940 and 1980. She was born in Copenhagen, Denmark and died in Denmark. She is buried at Vestre Kirkegård in Copenhagen. Heimann was married to actor Louis Miehe-Renard.

== Selected filmography ==
- I kongens klæ'r (1954)
- Færgekroen (1956)
- Tag til marked i Fjordby (1957)
- Pigen og vandpytten (1958)
- Passer passer piger (1965)
