= Carl Fischer (actor) =

Danish actor

- Born: 9 October 1876; Denmark
- Died: 7 August 1953 (aged 76); Denmark
- Occupation: Actor
- Years active: 1911-1948

Carl Fischer (9 October 1876 – 7 August 1953) was a Danish actor. He appeared in more than 25 films between 1911 and 1948.

== Selected filmography ==
- 5 raske piger (1933)
- Ud i den kolde sne (1934)
- Panserbasse (1936)
- Blaavand melder storm (1938)
- I de gode, gamle dage (1940)
- Moster fra Mols (1943)
