= Skibet er ladet med =

1960 film

- Directed by: Peer Guldbrandsen
- Written by: Peer Guldbrandsen
- Produced by: Peer Guldbrandsen
- Starring: Kjeld Petersen
- Cinematography: Karl Andersson
- Edited by: Christian Hartkopp
- Production company: Saga Studio
- Release date: 3 October 1960
- Running time: 90 minutes
- Country: Denmark
- Language: Danish

Skibet er ladet med (English: The ship is loaded with) is a 1960 Danish comedy film directed by Peer Guldbrandsen and starring Kjeld Petersen.

== Cast ==
- Kjeld Petersen - Reklamechef Kurt Svendsen
- Jørgen Reenberg - Musikforlægger Peter Bangel
- Frits Helmuth - Max Ibsen
- Louis Miehe-Renard - Radiomekaniker Ib Blomquist
- Mimi Heinrich - Viola
- Dirch Passer - Guvernør Alfond d. 1 / Alfond d. 2
- Preben Lerdorff Rye - Skipper på Jupiter
- Jon Branner - Kalle Karlson
- Marianne Wesén - Britta
- Gerda Madsen - Gudrun
- Sven Buemann - Skattesekretær Sørensen
- Christian Hartkopp - Skattesekretær
- Mogens Brandt - Programchef i Støjhuset
- Aage Winther-Jørgensen - Støjhus direktør
- Else Jarlbak - Støjhus direktørfrue
- Elith Foss - Krigsminister
- Svend Bille - Generalen
- Knud Rex - Flådechef
- Povl Wøldike
- Bjørn Puggaard-Müller - Søofficer
- Jørgen Buckhøj - Mariner
- Preben Kaas - Betjent Mortensen
- Gunnar Strømvad - Grænsevagt i Piratia
- Bent Bentzen
- Kitty Beneke
- Jørgen Krogh - Matros
- Flemming Dyjak - Matros
- Bjørn Spiro - Grænsevagt i Piratia
