= John Olsen (filmmaker) =

Danish film producer

- Born: 12 August 1888; Copenhagen, Denmark
- Died: 9 December 1959 (aged 71); Denmark
- Occupations: Screenwriter; Film producer
- Years active: 1935-1959

John Olsen (12 August 1888 – 9 December 1959) was a Danish film producer, screenwriter and theater owner. Olsen founded the Saga Studio in Copenhagen, Denmark where he produced more than 30 films from 1941 to 1959, including the Danish Culture Canon film Soldaten og Jenny. He wrote 24 films between 1936 and 1960. In 1941, Olsen built and operated one of Scandinavia's largest movie theaters, the 1513-seat Saga Teatret in Copenhagen.

== Early life ==
Friedjohn Fulton Olsen was born in Copenhagen, the second youngest son of manufacturer Frederik Ferdinand Olsen, who ran a small business of collecting rags and bones for further processing. He attended Vestre Borgerdydsskole where he earned a primary diploma, and then moved to Germany for a merchant apprenticeship.

== Career ==
In 1910, Olsen began work for the Moving Picture Agency in London, working variously as a developer, cinematographer, distributor and company representative. After 3 years, he opened his own distribution company in London for the sale of films to Scandinavia. In 1915 he returned to Denmark and renamed the business Overseas Film Trading Company. While spending much of the year traveling to Hollywood, Olsen secured the distribution rights for the films of Charlie Chaplin and D.W. Griffith as well as the received the films at First National and Warner Bros.

After starting a separate movie rental company in 1933, Olsen also began producing his own films at a studio in Hellerup. In 1936 Olsen joined Lau Lauritzen Jr. and Henning Karmark in the founding of the ASA Film Studio, where he helped to produce twenty films. In 1942, after a falling out with Henning Karmark over financial issues, Olsen started his own production company, film studio, Saga Studios in Charlottenlund. The same year he also built the 1513-seat Saga Theater, one of Scandinavia's largest cinema.

At Saga Studio, Olsen was producer for every production. To a large extent, he was also a writer or co-creator, working with Victor Borge, Arvid Muller, Paul Sarauw, Annelise Reenberg and others. His Saga Studio productions were very successful and included the popular hit comedies of Dirch Passer. In addition, Olsen produced some more serious, critically acclaimed films including Der kom en dag and Soldaten og Jenny which won the first Bodil Award for best film and is one of ten films in the Danish Cultural Canon.

Olsen wrote more than twenty screenplays between 1936 and 1960, including Recrut 67, Petersen, Det var pa Rundetarn, Ferry Inn, Mate Karlsen and Baronessen fra Benzintanken, his last film.

Olsen died in Copenhagen on 9 December 1959 and was buried in Frederiksberg Cemetery. John Flemming Olsen, his son from his marriage to Inger Marie Karmann on 8 April 1916, continued the leadership of the Saga Studios until it closed in 1974.

== Selected filmography ==
- Sun Over Denmark (1936)
- For Better, for Worse (1938)
- Rekrut 67, Petersen (1952)
- I kongens klæ'r (1954)
- Det var paa Rundetaarn (1955)
- Færgekroen (1956)
- Tag til marked i Fjordby (1957)
- Onkel Bill fra New York (1959)
- Charles' Aunt (1959)
- Baronessen fra benzintanken (1960)
