= Krudt og klunker =

1958 Danish comedy film

- Directed by: Annelise Hovmand
- Written by: Annelise Hovmand; Benjamin Jacobsen; Finn Methling
- Produced by: Johan Jacobsen
- Starring: Gunnar Lauring
- Cinematography: Rudolf Frederiksen; Verner Jensen
- Release date: 7 April 1958
- Running time: 78 minutes
- Country: Denmark
- Language: Danish

Krudt og klunker is a 1958 Danish comedy film directed by Annelise Hovmand and starring Gunnar Lauring.

== Cast ==
- Gunnar Lauring as Professor Edward Jacobsen
- Vera Gebuhr as Fru Wilhelmine Jacobsen
- Sigrid Horne-Rasmussen as Faster Ragnhild Jacobsen
- Ellen Nielsen as Bedstemor
- Elga Olga Svendsen as Kokkepigen Kathrine
- Johannes Meyer as Professor Ferdinand Schrøder
- Vivi Bach as Therese Schrøder (as Vivi Bak)
- Jørgen Reenberg as Hans
- Kjeld Petersen as Slangetæmmer Hermansen
- Dirch Passer as Fotograf
- Kai Selliken as Karl Jacobsen
- Eva Cohn as Magda Jacobsen
- Anders Cohn as Benjamin Jacobsen
- Poul Finn Poulsen as Emil Jacobsen
- Susanne Randrup as Anna Jacobsen
- Charlotte Stig-Poulsen as Viktor Jacobsen
- Alfred Wilken as Postbudet
- Ingeborg Skov as Enkepastorinde Sartorius
- Ole Monty as 1. betjent
- Johannes Marott as 2. betjent
- Povl Wøldike as Den vagthavende assistant
- Professor Tribini as Børsten
- Tao Michaëlis as Deliristen
- Lise Thomsen as Nyhavnpigen
- Karen Rud as Enkefru Poulsen (Bedstemors faster)
- Svend Bille as Apoteker Madsen
- Mogens Brandt as Værten
- Jørgen Ryg as Pianisten
- Nick Miehe as Violinisten
- Klaus Nielsen as Havebetjenten
- Lili Heglund as Ammen
- Miskow Makwarth as Kustoden
- Peter Kitter as Neaderthaleren
- Bernhard Brasso as Den svensktalende, polske Styrmand
- Minna Jørgensen as Den gamle Neanderthalerkone
- Charles Rhodes as Negeren
- Vera Stricker as Anden Nyhavnspige
- Victor Montell as Fortæller (Benjamin som gammel)
