= Jeg elsker dig =

1957 film

- Directed by: Torben Anton Svendsen
- Written by: H. C. Branner
- Produced by: Erik Balling
- Starring: Annie Birgit Garde; Frits Helmuth
- Cinematography: Poul Pedersen
- Distributed by: Nordisk Film
- Release date: 16 August 1957
- Running time: 86 minutes
- Country: Denmark
- Language: Danish

Jeg elsker dig is a 1957 Danish family film directed by Torben Anton Svendsen and starring Annie Birgit Garde, and Frits Helmuth.

== Cast ==
- Annie Birgit Garde as Clara
- Frits Helmuth as David
- Karin Nellemose as Leonora
- Ebbe Rode as August
- Berthe Qvistgaard as Vivian
- Poul Reichhardt as André
- Clara Pontoppidan as Læserbrevsredaktøren Fru Nanna
- Else-Marie as Fru Sylvia
- Clara Østø as Frk. Muhs
- Poul Müller
- Paul Hagen
- Carl Ottosen
- Birthe Wilke
