= Lykkens musikanter =

1962 film

- Directed by: Peer Guldbrandsen
- Written by: Peer Guldbrandsen; Patricia McLean
- Produced by: Peer Guldbrandsen
- Starring: Ellen Gottschalch
- Cinematography: Karl Andersson
- Edited by: Jon Branner
- Music by: Sven Gyldmark
- Production company: Saga Studios
- Release date: 19 February 1962
- Running time: 84 minutes
- Country: Denmark
- Language: Danish

Lykkens musikanter is a 1962 Danish film directed by Peer Guldbrandsen and starring Ellen Gottschalch.

The film's story revolves around a quaint old house that is a sanctuary for the neighborhood's residents, where they are allowed to be different, to be themselves in an alienated world.

== Cast ==
- Ellen Gottschalch - Lydia Wiljengren
- Ove Sprogøe - Havemand Texas
- Dirch Passer - Elevatorfører Gogol
- Kjeld Petersen - Sagfører Dagerman
- Bent Mejding - Sagfører Rolf Dagerman
- Ulla Lock - Nancy Hansen
- Frede Heiselberg - Jon Dagerman
- Hans W. Petersen - Tømmerhandler Dagerman
- Bertel Lauring - Slagteren
- Ingela Brander - Solveig
- Helle Halding - Rakel
- Michaela Davidsen - Ung kontordame
