= Peer Guldbrandsen =

Danish screenwriter and actor (1912–1996)

- Born: 22 October 1912; Odense, Denmark
- Died: 13 March 1996 (aged 83); Denmark
- Occupations: Screenwriter; Actor; Film director Film producer
- Years active: 1939–1978

Peer Guldbrandsen (22 October 1912 – 13 March 1996) was a Danish screenwriter, actor, film director and producer. He wrote for 42 films between 1940 and 1976. He also appeared in 23 films between 1939 and 1978.

== Selected filmography ==
- Girls at Arms 2 (1976)
- Tough Guys of the Prairie (1970)
- The Daughter: I, a Woman Part III (1970)
- 2 – I, a Woman, Part II (1968)
- Me and My Kid Brother (1967)
- Onkel Joakims hemmelighed (1967)
- I, a Lover (1966)
- I, a Woman (1965)
- The Girl and the Millionaire (1965)
- Summer in Tyrol (1964)
- Majorens oppasser (1964)
- The Girl and the Press Photographer (1963)
- Lykkens musikanter (1962)
- Skibet er ladet med (1960)
- Baronessen fra benzintanken (1960)
- The Greeneyed Elephant (1960)
- Onkel Bill fra New York (1959)
- Tag til marked i Fjordby (1957)
- Dorte (1951)
- Stjerneskud (1947)
