= Rekrut 67, Petersen =

1952 film

- Film poster
- Directed by: Poul Bang
- Written by: Arvid Müller; John Olsen
- Starring: Lily Broberg
- Cinematography: Jørgen Christian Jensen; Ole Lytken
- Edited by: Anker Sørensen
- Music by: Sven Gyldmark
- Production company: Saga Studios
- Release date: 7 August 1952
- Running time: 78 minutes
- Country: Denmark
- Language: Danish

Rekrut 67, Petersen is a 1952 Danish family film directed by Poul Bang.

== Cast ==
- Lily Broberg as Grete Petersen
- Gunnar Lauring as Kaptajn Fang
- Kate Mundt as Anna Mogensen
- Ib Schønberg as Dr. Christiansen
- Buster Larsen as Peter Rasmussen
- Dirch Passer as Lillebilchauffør Larsen
- Rasmus Christiansen as Viceværten
- Henry Nielsen as Mælkemanden
- Henny Lindorff Buckhøj as Fru Rasmussen
- Ove Sprogøe as Rekrut 68
- Valdemar Skjerning as Direktør I stormagasinet
- Svend Pedersen as Programleder
- Vibeke Warlev as Pianistinden
- Marie Bisgaard as Koncertsangerinde
- Inge Ketti as Alma, stuepige på Krogerup
- Robert Eiming as Direktionssekretær
- Inge-Lise Grue as Ekspeditrice
- Else Jarlbak as Kunde I stormagasin
- Agnes Phister-Andresen as Kunde I stormagasin
- Edith Hermansen
