= Ma and Pa Kettle on Vacation =

1953 film

- Theatrical release poster
- Directed by: Charles Lamont
- Written by: Jack Henley
- Based on: The Egg and I by Betty MacDonald
- Produced by: Leonard Goldstein
- Starring: Marjorie Main; Percy Kilbride
- Cinematography: George Robinson
- Edited by: Leonard Weiner
- Music by: Herman Stein
- Production company: Universal Pictures
- Distributed by: Universal Pictures
- Release date: April 20, 1953
- Running time: 76 minutes
- Country: United States
- Language: English
- Box office: $2.2 million (US)

Ma and Pa Kettle on Vacation is a 1953 American comedy film directed by Charles Lamont. It is the sixth installment of Universal-International's Ma and Pa Kettle series starring Marjorie Main and Percy Kilbride.

== Plot ==
In May 1953, Ma and Pa Kettle are invited, by their daughter-in-law Kim's parents, Jonathan and Elizabeth Parker, to a trip to Paris. Leaving the kids with an Indian babysitter, Ma and Pa head out to France on an airplane. Upon arrival, Pa tries to buy racy postcards, and they get caught into a circle with a famous gang of spies, who want an envelope that is in Pa's possession.

== Cast ==
- Marjorie Main as Ma Kettle
- Percy Kilbride as Pa Kettle
- Ray Collins as Jonathan Parker
- Barbara Brown as Elizabeth Parker
- Bodil Miller as Inez Kraft
- Sig Ruman as Cyrus Kraft
- Oliver Blake as Geoduck
- Teddy Hart as Crowbar
- Ivan Triesault as Henri Dupre
- Peter Brocco as Adolf Wade
- Rosario Imperio as Apache Team (Indian babysitter)
- Uncredited players include Alma Lawton, Gino Corrado, Jean De Briac, Lawrence Dobkin, John Eldredge and Franklyn Farnum.
