= Pigen og vandpytten =

1958 film

- Directed by: Bent Christensen
- Written by: Bent Christensen; Werner Hedman
- Produced by: Aage Stentoft
- Starring: Lily Broberg
- Cinematography: Jørgen Skov
- Edited by: Carsten Dahl
- Music by: Ib Glindemann
- Release date: 24 November 1958
- Running time: 97 minutes
- Country: Denmark
- Language: Danish

Pigen og vandpytten is a 1958 Danish family film directed by Bent Christensen and starring Lily Broberg. It is an uncredited remake of the German film And Who Is Kissing Me? written by Friedrich Dammann and Herbert Rosenfeld.

In this 97-minute film, a just-fired chorus girl gets a ride from a rich shipowner's driver. By the time the gossip reaches the cash-strapped theater director, she's engaged to the shipowner. The girl gets promoted to the lead. Other misunderstandings follow.

== Cast ==
- Lily Broberg as Mai Grøndahl
- Preben Mahrt as Erik Thorbjørn
- Buster Larsen as Teaterdirektører
- Christian Arhoff as Rasmus Frederik Christian Block
- Kjeld Petersen as Forfatter
- Dirch Passer as Fabrikant Munk
- Marguerite Viby as Fru Hammer
- Sigrid Horne-Rasmussen as Direktør Stella
- Bodil Steen as Baronesse Grunenskjold
- Povl Wøldike as Baron Grunenskjold
- Preben Uglebjerg as Peter
- Caja Heimann as Veninde af Mai
- Bjørn Puggaard-Müller as Svend Aasgaard
- Karl Stegger as Bogtrykker
- Henry Nielsen - Portneren Lasse
- Ole Monty as Overtjener
- Vivi Bach as Gæst i restaurant
- Johannes Marott as Andersen
- Jørgen Beck as Scenemester
- Bjørn Spiro as Betjent
- Axel Strøbye as Journalist
- Ib Glindemann as Kapelmester (uncredited)
