= Det støver stadig =

1962 film

- Promotional poster
- Directed by: Poul Bang
- Written by: Arvid Müller; Aage Stentoft; Øyvind Vennerød
- Starring: Helle Virkner
- Cinematography: Aage Wiltrup
- Edited by: Lizzi Weischenfeldt
- Music by: Sven Gyldmark
- Production company: Saga Studios
- Release date: 28 September 1962
- Running time: 82 minutes
- Country: Denmark
- Language: Danish

Det støver stadig (transl. It's still dusty) is a 1962 Danish comedy film directed by Poul Bang and starring Helle Virkner.

== Cast ==
- Helle Virkner – Fru Henriksen
- Søren Elung Jensen – Hr. Henriksen
- Dirch Passer – Alf Thomsen
- Hanne Borchsenius – Frk. Monalisa Jacobsen
- Henrik Wiehe – Hr. Johansen
- Bodil Udsen – Fru Hansen
- Ove Sprogøe – Thorbjørn Hansen
- Karl Stegger – Hr. Feddersen
- Solveig Sundborg – Fru Feddersen
- Beatrice Palner – Fru Svendsen
- Henning Palner – Hr. Svendsen
- Olaf Ussing – Borgmesteren
- Gunnar Lemvigh – T. Eliassen
- Paul Hagen – Fotograf
- Judy Gringer – Model
- Gunnar Bigum – Kunde hos Feddersen
- Asbjørn Andersen – Redaktøren
- Ellen Malberg
- Bettina Heltberg – Klinikassistent
- Edith Hermansen
- Einar Reim – Doctor Krogh
- Pierre Miehe-Renard
- Bente Weischenfeldt
- Ulla Darni
- Lene Bro – Fotomodel
- Ebba Amfeldt – Dame på posthus
