= Clara Østø =

Danish actress

- Born: 14 January 1911; Århus, Denmark
- Died: 22 May 1983 (aged 72); Copenhagen, Denmark
- Occupation: Actress
- Years active: 1934–1979

Clara Østø (14 January 1911 – 22 May 1983) was a Danish film actress. She appeared in 22 films between 1934 and 1979. She was born Laurita Clara Hansine Østergaard Olsen in Århus, Denmark and died in Copenhagen.

== Selected filmography ==
- Ud i den kolde sne (1934)
- Bag Københavns kulisser (1935)
- En ganske almindelig pige (1940)
- Så mødes vi hos Tove (1946)
- Det var paa Rundetaarn (1955)
- Jeg elsker dig (1957)
- Spøgelsestoget (1976)
