= Lili Heglund =

Danish actress (1904–1992)

- Born: 5 September 1904; Copenhagen, Denmark
- Died: 3 October 1992 (aged 88); Denmark
- Occupation: Actress
- Years active: 1938–1976

Lili Heglund (5 September 1904 – 3 October 1992) was a Danish film actress. She appeared in 24 films between 1938 and 1973. She was born in Copenhagen, Denmark and died in Denmark.

== Selected filmography ==
- Balletten danser – 1938
- Mordets melodi – 1944
- Den gamle mølle på Mols – 1953
- Hendes store aften – 1954
- Det var på Rundetårn – 1955
- Bruden fra Dragstrup – 1955
- Krudt og klunker – 1958
- Baronessen fra benzintanken – 1960
- Gøngehøvdingen – 1961
- Komtessen – 1961
- Drømmen om det hvide slot – 1962
- Frk. Nitouche – 1963
- Don Olsen kommer til byen – 1964
- Hold da helt ferie – 1965
- Nu stiger den – 1966
- Brødrene på Uglegården – 1967
- Hurra for de blå husarer – 1970
- Et døgn med Ilse – 1971
