= Baronessen fra benzintanken =

1960 film

- Directed by: Annelise Reenberg
- Written by: Peer Guldbrandsen; John Olsen; Annelise Reenberg
- Produced by: John Olsen
- Starring: Maria Garland; Ghita Nørby; Dirch Passer; Ove Sprogøe; Karin Nellemose
- Cinematography: Ole Lytken
- Edited by: Edith Nisted Nielsen
- Music by: Sven Gyldmark
- Production company: Saga Studio
- Release date: 5 September 1960
- Running time: 122 minutes
- Country: Denmark
- Language: Danish

Baronessen fra benzintanken (English: The Baroness from the Gas Station) is a 1960 Danish comedy film directed by Annelise Reenberg and starring Maria Garland, Ghita Nørby, Dirch Passer and Ove Sprogøe.

== Cast ==
- Maria Garland - Dowager baroness Alvilda von Rosensteen
- Ghita Nørby - Anne Tofte/von Rosensteen
- Karin Nellemose - Baroness Henriette von Rosensteen / Den Grå Dame (The Grey Lady)
- Dirch Passer - Hans Høy
- Ove Sprogøe - Lars Tofte
- Karl Stegger - Frederiksen, the butler
- Ulla Lock - Gerda, the housemaid
- Emil Hass Christensen - Berg, lawyer
- Henrik Wiehe - Henning Rabenfeldt
- Erni Arneson - Clarissa Rabenfeldt
- Henny Lindorff Buckhøj - Tora, the housekeeper
- Vivi Svendsen - The Cook
- Karen Berg - Astrid von Pleum, governess
- Bjørn Puggaard-Müller - Lord-in-Waiting Heidenfeldt-Oxenholm
- Lili Heglund - Baroness-in-Waiting Heidenfeldt-Oxenholm
