= Henny Lindorff Buckhøj =

Danish actress (1902–1979)

- Born: 29 April 1902; Denmark
- Died: 18 December 1979 (aged 77); Denmark
- Occupation: Actress
- Years active: 1944-1970

Henny Lindorff Buckhøj (29 April 1902 – 18 December 1979) was a Danish film actress. She appeared in 19 films between 1944 and 1970. She was born and died in Denmark. Henny was married to Per Buckhøj.

== Filmography ==
- Det bødes der for (1944)
- Elly Petersen (1944)
- Billet mrk. (1946)
- Ditte Menneskebarn (1946)
- Røverne fra Rold (1947)
- Unge piger forsvinder i København (1951)
- Rekrut 67 Petersen (1952)
- The Old Mill on Mols (1953)
- Himlen er blå (1954)
- Den kloge mand - 1956 (1956)
- Seksdagesløbet (1958)
- Guld og grønne skove (1958)
- Baronessen fra benzintanken (1960)
- Den kære familie (1962)
- Landmandsliv (1965)
- Den røde rubin (1969)
- Ta' lidt solskin (1969)
- Hurra for de blå husarer (1970)
