= Støv for alle pengene =

1963 film

- Directed by: Poul Bang
- Written by: Bent From; Ida From
- Starring: Søren Elung Jensen; Dirch Passer
- Cinematography: Ole Lytken; Aage Wiltrup
- Edited by: Lars Brydesen
- Music by: Sven Gyldmark
- Production company: Saga Studios
- Release date: 13 December 1963
- Running time: 93 minutes
- Country: Denmark
- Language: Danish

Støv for alle pengene is a 1963 Danish comedy film directed by Poul Bang and starring Søren Elung Jensen, with Dirch Passer.

The story is about the people in an apartment building who decide to invest in a farmhouse.

== Cast ==
- Søren Elung Jensen as Hr. Henriksen
- Helle Virkner as Bodil Henriksen
- Jan Priiskorn-Schmidt as Klaus Henriksen
- Dirch Passer as Alf Thomsen
- Hanne Borchsenius as Frk. Monalisa Jacobsen
- Ove Sprogøe as Thorbjørn Hansen
- Bodil Udsen as Rigmor Hansen
- Karl Stegger as Tim Feddersen
- Karen Lykkehus as Fru Feddersen
- Henning Palner as Viggo Svendsen
- Beatrice Palner as Lene Svendsen
- Asbjørn Andersen as Redaktøren
- Paul Hagen as Sælgeren
- Elith Foss as Chresten Christensen
- Ebba Amfeldt as Oda Christensen
- Valsø Holm as Købmanden
- Bent Vejlby as Pilot i sprøjtefly
- Holger Vistisen as Chaufør i mælkebil
- Jørgen Buckhøj as Rundviser på spritfabrikken
- Gyda Hansen as Kassedame
- Gunnar Strømvad
- Lise Thomsen
- Povl Wøldike
