= While the Attorney Is Asleep =

1945 film

- Directed by: Johan Jacobsen
- Written by: Gunnar Robert Hansen; Arvid Müller
- Produced by: Tage Nielsen
- Starring: Gunnar Lauring
- Cinematography: Einar Olsen
- Edited by: Edith Schlüssel
- Release date: 11 July 1945
- Running time: 80 minutes
- Country: Denmark
- Language: Danish

While the Attorney Is Asleep (Danish: Mens sagføreren sover) is a 1945 Danish crime film directed by Johan Jacobsen and starring Gunnar Lauring.

== Cast ==
- Gunnar Lauring as Erik Jessen
- Beatrice Bonnesen as Else Jessen
- Christian Arhoff as Magnus Stripp
- Elith Pio as Robert Jensen
- Gerda Neumann as Lilian Berner
- Sam Besekow as Takituki
- Poul Reichhardt as Charlie
- Freddy Albeck as Joe
- Gunnar Lemvigh as Mike
- Per Gundmann as Sam
- Valdemar Skjerning as Mr. Jorgensen
- Knud Heglund as Tardini
