= Onkel Joakims hemmelighed =

1967 film

- Directed by: Carl Ottosen
- Written by: Eva Eklund; Poul Mogensen; Carl Ottosen
- Produced by: Dirch Passer; Henrik Sandberg
- Starring: Gunnar Lauring
- Cinematography: Henning Bendtsen
- Edited by: Edith Nisted Nielsen
- Music by: Sven Gyldmark
- Release date: 24 November 1967
- Running time: 103 minutes
- Country: Denmark
- Language: Danish

Onkel Joakims hemmelighed (transl. Uncle Joakim's secret), also known as Nyhavns glade gutter, is a 1967 Danish family film directed by Carl Ottosen and starring Gunnar Lauring.

== Cast ==
- Gunnar Lauring as Viktor Erdner
- Sigrid Horne-Rasmussen as Emilie Erdner
- Vivi Bach as Eva Erdner
- Kai Holm as Joakim Nielsen
- Povl Wøldike as Count von Flagen
- Per Pallesen as Count Horace von Flagen
- Preben Mahrt as Lawyer Frost
- Willy Rathnov as Sailor Rasmus
- Paul Hagen as Viggo
- Ole Wisborg as Svend
- Karl Stegger as Morten Hansen
- Poul Bundgaard as The chef Søren
- Dirch Passer as The Masterthief
- Bodil Udsen as Waitress Mona Lisa
- Kirsten Peüliche as Waitress Vicki
- Preben Kaas as Esben Andersen
- Arthur Jensen as Peter Jensen
- Ove Sprogøe as CEO Schwartz
- André Sallyman as Louie
- Bent Vejlby as Max
- William Kisum as Esben
- Susanne Bruun-Koppel as Misse
- Marianne Kjærulff-Schmidt as Irene
- Ulla Johansson as Bitten
- Lisbeth Lindeborg as Rosa
- Peer Guldbrandsen as The Florist
- Marchen Passer as Maid
- Mogens Brandt as Psychiatrist Count von Flagen
- Jessie Rindom as Countess von Flagen
