= Styrmand Karlsen =

1958 film

- Poster by Aage Lundvald
- Directed by: Annelise Reenberg
- Written by: Bent Christensen; Leif Panduro
- Produced by: Poul Bang; John Olsen
- Starring: Dirch Passer
- Cinematography: Henning Kristiansen
- Edited by: Anker Sørensen
- Music by: Sven Gyldmark
- Production company: Saga Studio
- Release date: 13 August 1958
- Running time: 132 minutes
- Country: Denmark
- Language: Danish

Styrmand Karlsen (English: Helmsman Karlsen) is a 1958 Danish film directed by Annelise Reenberg.

== Cast ==
- Johannes Meyer – Captain Vilhelm Hammer
- Frits Helmuth – First mate Knud Karlsen
- Dirch Passer – Valdemar Bøgelund
- Ove Sprogøe – Ole Olsen
- Ghita Nørby – Anne Marie Bøgelund
- Ebbe Langberg – Robert Lemborg
- Emil Hass Christensen – Shipowner J.C. Lemborg
- Bodil Udsen – Olga
- Clara Østø – Dronning Viktoria / The Queen
- Helge Kjærulff-Schmidt – Knudsen
- Tove Wisborg - Bibiani
- Karl Stegger – Justitsminister
- Jeanne Darville – Jeanette
- Gabriel Axel – Pierre
- Knud Hallest – Captain
