= Nyhavn 17 =

Listed building in Copenhagen

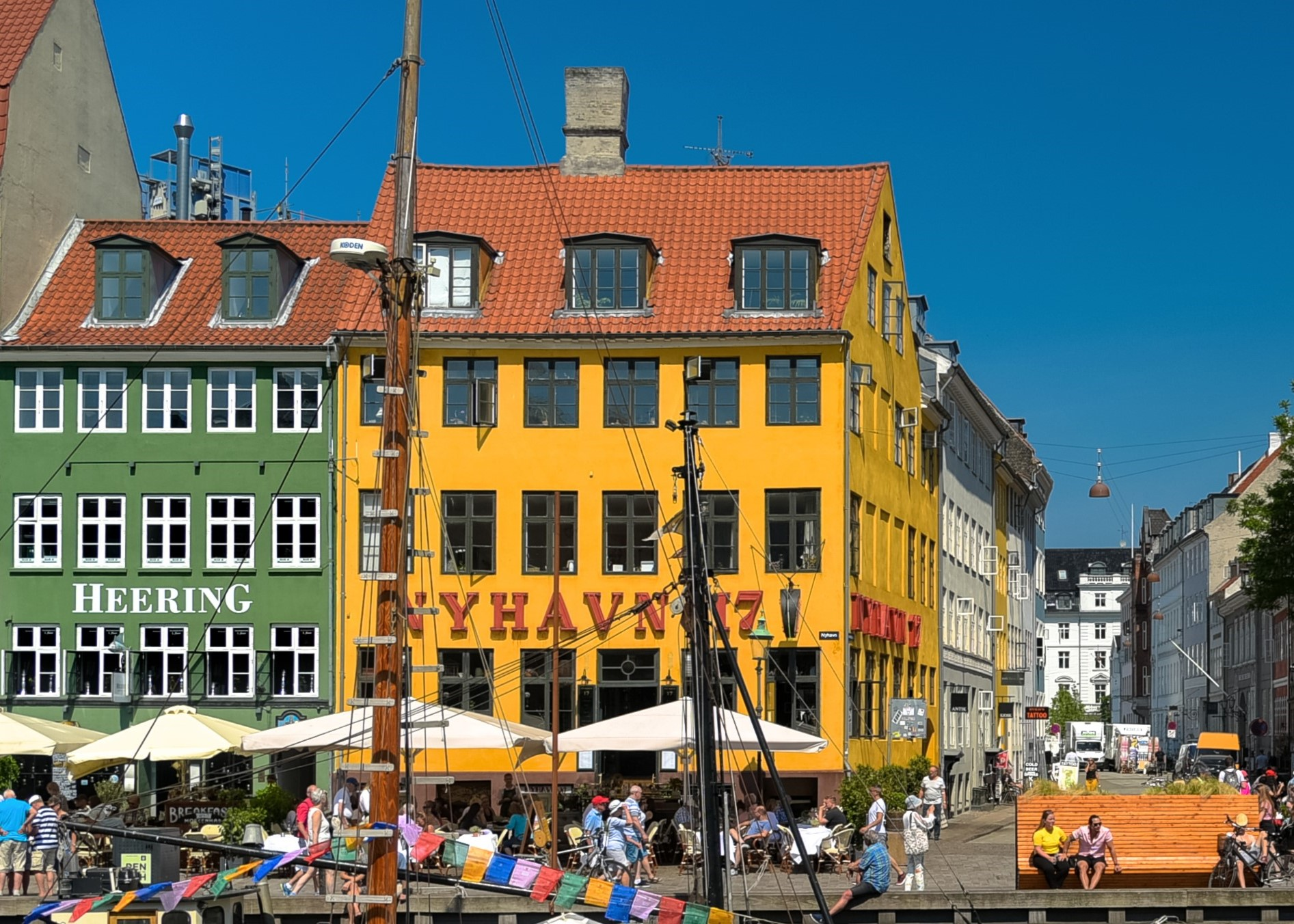
- Interactive map of the Nyhavn 17 area

General information
- Location: Copenhagen, Denmark
- Coordinates: 55°40′49.91″N 12°35′20.83″E
- Completed: C. 1680s
- Renovated: 1752-1768 (heightened), 1778 (L. Strandgade extension)

Nyhavn 17 is a late 17th-century building situated at the corner of Nyhavn and Lille Strandstræde in central Copenhagen, Denmark. It was listed on the Danish registry of protected buildings and places in 1951.

== Architecture ==
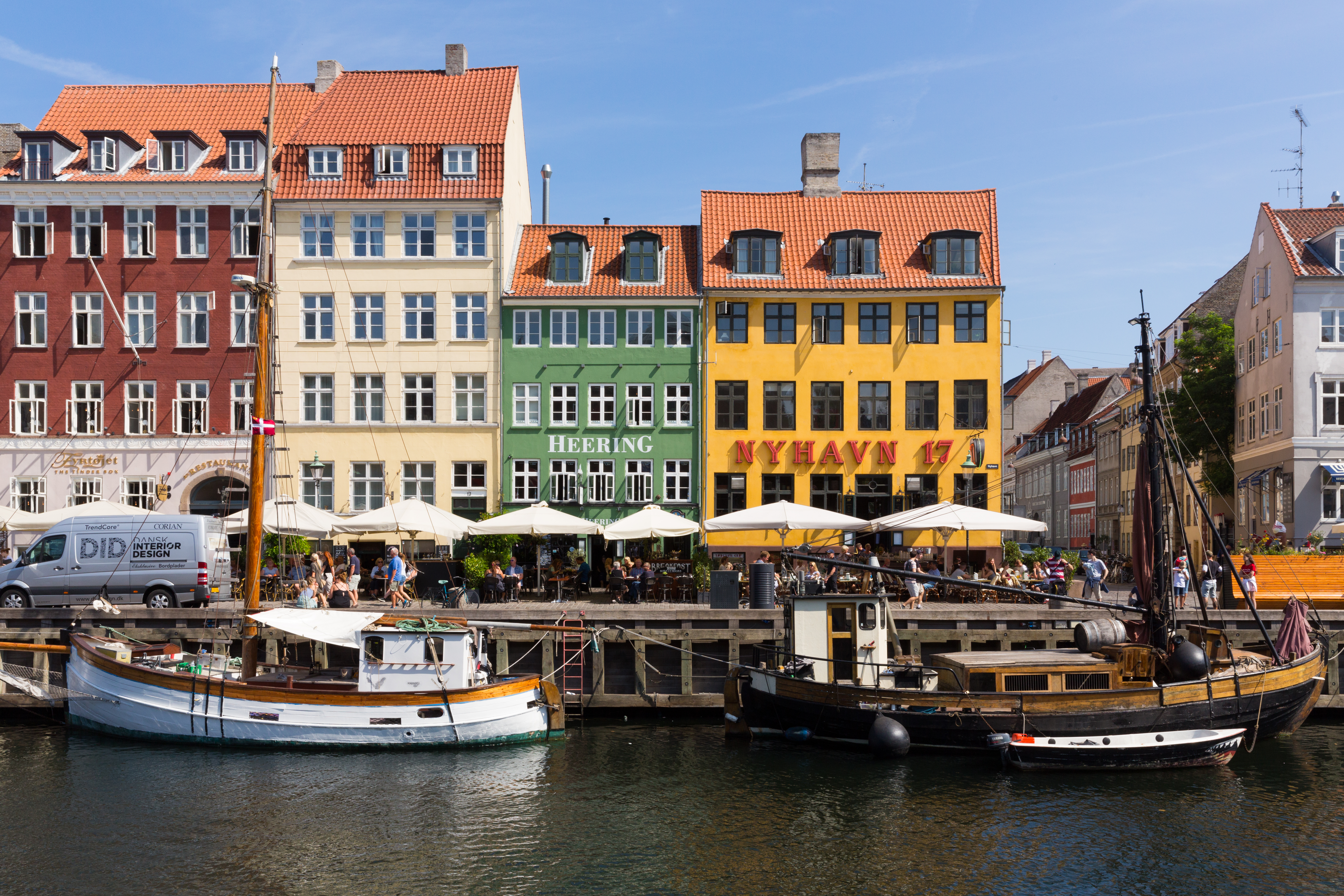
Nyhavn 11–Nyhavn 17

The corner building was originally constructed with timber-framing with just two storeys over a walk-out basement, with a six-bay-long principal facade towards Nyhavn and a five-bay-long gable towards Lille Strandstræde. Some time between 1752 and 1768 the building was heightened with one storey and the facades towards the two streets were at the same time reconstructed in brick. The main entrance is located in the third bay from the left (east). The two basement entrances are located in the first and fifth bay. The second and third window towards Lille Strandstræde have been bricked up on the two upper floors. The building is topped by a pitched roof clad in red tiles and features two dormer windows towards the canal. The roof ridge is pierced by a robust brick chimney. The just two-bay-long, three-storey extension along Lille Strandstræde (Lille Strandstræde 1) was added in 1786. It is topped by a mansard roof.

== Cultural references ==
The poet Tom Kristensen lived in Lille Strandstræde. He mentions the building in the opening stanza of his 1922 poem Nyhavns-Odyssé:

In Danish
Hotellet "Dagmar Hansen" og Caféen "Mozambique"
Stod fjernt i Horizonten om min Barndoms Odyssé
Og funklede med skiltene og dunkende musik
Og skreg i Sømandsdille til om Natten Klokken tre.

In English
The hotel "Dagmar Hansen" and the café "Mozambique
Stood far in the horizon of my Childhood Odyssey
And sparkled with the Signs and throbbing Music
And screamed in a sailor's frenzy until three o'clock at night

The building was used as the central location in the eponymous George Schneevoigt-directed 1933 comedy film Nyhavn 17. A just 12-year-old Buster Larsen had his feature film debut in the film as a boy dancing on one of the tables in the café. Nyhavn 17 was also used as the central location in the Alice O'Fredericks/Lau Lauritzen-directed 1939 comedy film I dag begynder livet.
