= Buster Larsen =

Danish actor (1920–1993)

- Born: 1 September 1920; Copenhagen, Denmark
- Died: 18 December 1993 (aged 73); Copenhagen, Denmark
- Years active: 1932–1992

Axel Landing Larsen known as Buster Larsen (1 September 1920 – 18 December 1993), was a Danish stage, film and TV actor. He had his stage debut on Nørrebros Theater in 1932 aged 12, and his film debut in 1933.

== Filmography ==
- De blaa drenge – 1933
- Frøken Kirkemus – 1941
- Ebberød Bank – 1943
- Møllen – 1943
- Guds mærkelige veje – 1944
- Familien Gelinde – 1944
- Den usynlige hær – 1945
- Hans store aften – 1946
- Når katten er ude – 1947
- Tre år efter – 1948
- Lejlighed til leje – 1949
- Berlingske Tidende – 1949
- Fodboldpræsten – 1951
- Rekrut 67 Petersen – 1952
- Ved Kongelunden – 1953
- I kongens klær – 1954
- Ild og Jord – 1955
- Det var på Rundetårn – 1955
- Hvad vil De ha'? – 1956
- Færgekroen – 1956
- Hidden Fear – 1957
- Tag til marked i Fjordby – 1957
- Lån mig din kone – 1957
- Pigen og vandpytten – 1958
- Pigen i søgelyset – 1959
- Vi er allesammen tossede – 1959
- Cirkus Buster – 1961
- Duellen – 1962
- Den kære familie – 1962
- Don Olsen kommer til byen – 1963
- Hvad med os? – 1963
- Når enden er go' – 1964
- The Reluctant Sadist – 1967
- Stormvarsel – 1968
- Damernes ven – 1969
- Mordskab – 1969
- Med kærlig hilsen – 1971
- Far til fire i højt humør – 1971
- Hovedjægerne – 1971
- Kassen stemmer – 1976
- Olsen-banden ser rødt – 1976
- Hærværk – 1977
- Olsen-banden overgiver sig aldrig – 1979
- Attentat – 1980
- Jeppe på bjerget – 1981
- Det parallelle lig – 1982
- Kurt og Valde – 1983
- Midt om natten – 1984
- Busters verden – 1984
- Pelle Erobreren – 1987
- Retfærdighedens rytter – 1989
- Krummerne – 1991
- Krummerne 2 – Stakkels Krumme – 1992
