= Magic in Town =

1968 film

- Directed by: Annelise Reenberg
- Written by: Annelise Reenberg
- Produced by: Lars Kolvig; Erik Larsen
- Starring: Jeanne Darville
- Cinematography: Mikael Salomon
- Edited by: Maj Soya
- Music by: Sven Gyldmark
- Production company: Saga Studios
- Release date: 11 October 1968
- Running time: 95 minutes
- Country: Denmark
- Language: Danish

Magic in Town (Danish: Min søsters børn vælter byen) is a 1968 Danish comedy film directed by Annelise Reenberg and starring Jeanne Darville.

== Cast ==
- Jeanne Darville as Else Berg
- William Rosenberg as Peter Berg
- Pusle Helmuth as Pusle Berg
- Jan Priiskorn-Schmidt as Jan Berg
- Vibeke Houlberg as Lotte Berg
- Michael Rosenberg as Michael Berg
- Sonja Oppenhagen as Rikke Berg
- Lars Madsen as Blop Berg
- Sigrid Horne-Rasmussen as Fru Jensen
- Karen Berg as Tante Alma
- Dirch Passer as Dr. Mogensen
- Ove Sprogøe as Politiassistent Møller
- Bjørn Puggaard-Müller as Overbetjent Pedersen
- Karl Stegger as Advokat Andersen
- Thecla Boesen as Fru Edel Andersen
