= Paul Sarauw =

Danish screenwriter

- Born: 30 November 1883; Copenhagen, Denmark
- Died: 24 April 1959 (aged 75); Copenhagen, Denmark
- Other name: Poul Sarauw
- Occupation: Screenwriter
- Years active: 1916–1959
- Spouse: Ingeborg Bruhn Bertelsen (m. 1930, divorced)

Paul Sarauw (30 November 1883 – 24 April 1959) was a Danish screenwriter. He wrote for more than 50 films between 1916 and 1959. He was born and died in Denmark.

== Selected filmography ==
- Skal vi vædde en million? (1932)
- Lalla vinner! (1932)
- Odds 777 (1932)
- Prisoner Number One (1935)
- I dag begynder livet (1939)
- Familien Olsen (1940)
- Pas på svinget i Solby (1940)
- Frøken Kirkemus (1941)
- Frk. Vildkat (1942)
- Hans onsdagsveninde (1943)
- Teatertosset (1944)
- Dolly Takes a Chance (1944)
- Panik i familien (1945)
- De kloge og vi gale (1945)
- Onsdagsväninnan (1946)
- Ved kongelunden... (1953)
- Arvingen (1954)
- Færgekroen (1956)
