= Bodil Miller =

Danish actress and model

Bodil Miller née Møller (1928–2017) was a Danish film actress and model. She studied drama at Frederiksbergske Teatres Elevskole in Copenhagen but soon moved to Hollywood and joined Universal Studios where she performed in three or four movies. After her marriage with the screenwriter Eugene Solov ended in divorce in 1954, she returned to Denmark and married Universal's local director Knud Eigil Jørgensen. She performed roles in a few Danish films without acclaim but then became a highly successful model, appearing in Danish magazines as well as in Vogue and Harper's Bazaar.

== Early life and education ==
Born on 14 April 1928 in Nørresundby in the north of Jutland, Bodil Møller was the daughter of the factory foreman Alfred Rasmus Jespersen Møller and his wife Edith Marie née Jensen. Following her father's early death, when she was seven, together with her mother and siblings she moved to Copenhagen. After beginning a housekeeping course at Ledreborg, she decided she wanted to work in farming an attended Haslev Landbrugsskole. She then turned to drama, training under Einar Juhl and as a student at Frederiksbergske Teatres Elevskole.

== Career ==
She managed to perform one role in Denmark as the daughter in Liliom before she moved to Hollywood in 1951. After further training at Universal Studios, she had roles in a few films including Ma and Pa Kettle on Vacation, Scarlet Angel and Because of You but without any real success. While in Hollywood, she married the screenwriter Eugene Solow but the marriage was dissolved in 1954 and she returned to Denmark.

In October 1955, she married Knud Eigil Jørgensen, the Universal Studios director in Denmark, with whom she had a son. She took a number of roles in Danish films, the most significant being in the Danish version of science fiction movie Reptilicus.

Miller later became a highly successful model, appearing in Denmark's leading magazines as well as in Vogue and Harper's Bazar.

Bodil Miller died in Hellerup on 16 September 2017.
