= Annelise Reenberg =

Danish film director

- Born: 16 September 1919; Copenhagen, Denmark
- Died: 12 December 1994 (aged 75); Gentofte Municipality, Denmark
- Occupation(s): Cinematographer; Film director Screenwriter
- Years active: 1950–1971

Annelise Reenberg (16 September 1919 – 12 December 1994) was a Danish cinematographer, film director and screenwriter. She directed 23 films between 1950 and 1971.

== Filmography (selected) ==
- Historien om Hjortholm (1950)
- 24 timer (1951)
- Fra den gamle Købmandsgaard (1951)
- The Old Mill on Mols (1953)
- Hendes store aften (1954)
- Bruden fra Dragstrup (1955)
- Kristiane af Marstal (1956)
- Tre piger fra Jylland (1957)
- Styrmand Karlsen (1958)
- Baronessen fra benzintanken (1960)
- Peters baby (1961)
- Han, Hun, Dirch og Dario (1962)
- Venus fra Vestø (1962)
- Frøken Nitouche (1963)
- Alt for kvinden (1964)
- En ven i bolignøden (1965)
- Een pige og 39 sømænd (1965)
- Min søsters børn (1966)
- Min søsters børn på bryllupsrejse (1967)
- Magic in Town (1968)
- Ta' lidt solskin (1969)
- Hooray for the Blue Hussars (1970)
- Kid Gang on the Go (1971)
