= Jenny and the Soldier =

1947 film

- DVD Cover for the film Soldaten og Jenny
- Directed by: Johan Jacobsen
- Written by: Johan Jacobsen; Carl Erik Soya
- Produced by: John Olsen
- Starring: Poul Reichhardt; Bodil Kjer
- Cinematography: Aage Wiltrup
- Edited by: Anker Sørensen
- Music by: Kai Møller
- Production company: Saga Studios
- Release dates: 30 October 1947 (Denmark); 1948 (United States)
- Running time: 92 min.
- Country: Denmark
- Language: Danish

Jenny and the Soldier (Danish: Soldaten og Jenny) is a 1947 Danish dramatic film written and directed by Johan Jacobsen. The black-and-white film is based on the 1940 stage play Brudstykker af et mønster (lit. 'Fragments of a pattern') written by Danish playwright Carl Erik Soya. The gritty romantic drama received critical praise for its authentic portrayal of everyday life. Jacobsen received the first Bodil Award for Best Danish Film, while both Poul Reichhardt and Bodil Kjer were awarded Bodils for their leading roles. Jenny and the Soldier is one of the twelve films listed in Denmark's cultural canon by the Danish Ministry of Culture.

== Synopsis ==
Two common working-class people, Robert and Jenny, meet one day in a bar. After Robert defends Jenny against her date, a district attorney's chauffeur, who is trying to get her drunk, they begin a relationship. She soon discovers that she will be tried in court for an abortion she needed a few years previously. Her parents disown her and she loses her job as a saleswoman. Robert stays with her, admitting his own responsibility for killing someone when he was 17 years old. Distraught at the thought of going to prison, Jenny convinces Robert to commit suicide with her. Just as she is planning the suicide, her lawyer comes and announces that the case has been dropped—the case had been delayed too long while the district attorney was in the hospital after his chauffeur has caused an automobile accident. The film ends with the couple declaring that in spite of their ancient unfortunate circumstances, they have at least one another, after which they embrace each other.

== Cast ==
- Poul Reichhardt as Robert Olsen, soldier
- Bodil Kjer as Jenny Christensen
- Elith Pio as district attorney
- Karin Nellemose as district attorney's wife
- Johannes Meyer as Jenny's father
- Maria Garland as Jenny's mother
- Sigfred Johansen as prosecutor
- Gunnar Lauring as Gustav, district attorney's chauffeur
- Svend Methling as Sveistrup, "The Crazy Lawyer"
- Jessie Rindom as a gardener (credited as Jessie Lauring)
- Per Buckhøj as bartender
- Kirsten Borch as district attorney's maid
- Birgitte Reimer as prosecutor's secretary
