= Ghita Nørby =

Danish actress (born 1935)

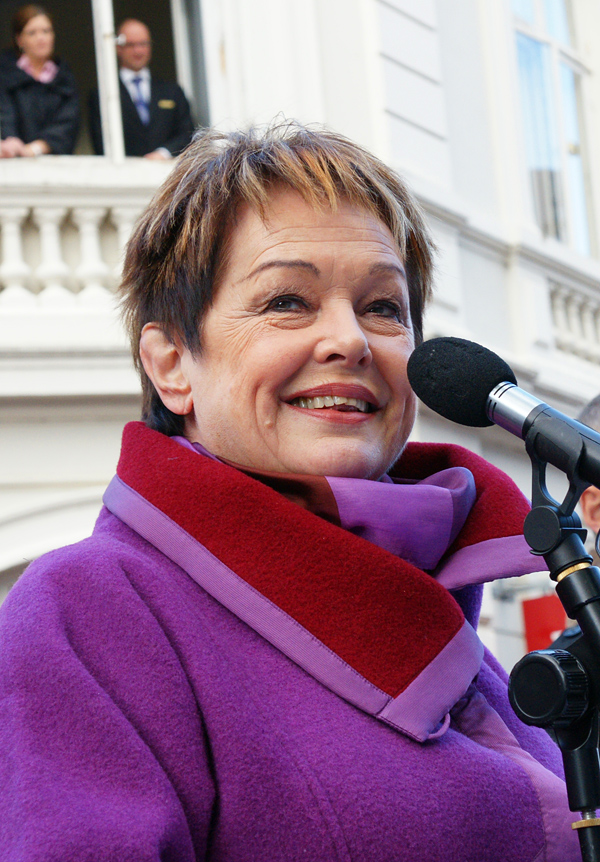
- Nørby in 2010
- Born: 11 January 1935 (age 91); Copenhagen, Denmark
- Occupation: Actress
- Spouse: Dario Campeotto (m. 1963; div. 1969)

Ghita Nørby (born 11 January 1935) is a Danish actress with 117 film credits to her name from 1956 to 2005, making her one of the most active Danish actresses ever.

== Early life ==
Nørby was born in Copenhagen, Denmark, the daughter of opera singer Einar Nørby (1896–1983). She studied two years at the Danish Royal Theatre (Det Kongelige Teater).

== Career ==
She was an actress at the theatre from 1956 to 1959.

She has received a number of awards and recognitions including the Ingenio et Arti medal in 2006. At the 27th Guldbagge Awards she was nominated for the award for Best Actress for her role in Freud Leaving Home.

== Personal life ==
She has been married a number of times, first in 1956 to architect Mogens Garth-Grüner. She met her next husband, Italian pop singer/actor Dario Campeotto, on the set of a film they were shooting in 1962. They were married in 1963, and had a son, actor Giacomo Campeotto, in 1964. They were divorced in 1969. She married a third time to actor Jørgen Reenberg in April 1970. Her fourth husband was pianist/composer Svend Skipper. They married in 1984 and divorced in 2011.

== Selected filmography ==
- Charles' tante (Charles' Aunt, International English title) (1959), role of Laura Hornemann
- Frihedens pris (1960), role of Lis
- Baronessen fra benzintanken (The Baroness from the Gas Station) 1960, role of Anne Tofte/von Rosensten
- Han, Hun, Dirch og Dario 1962
- Oskar 1962
- Den kære familie 1962
- Sytten 1965
- I Am Looking for a Man 1966
- Sangen om den Røde Rubin 1970
- Amour 1970
- Matador (Monopoly) 1978, TV series, role of Ingeborg Skjern
- Me and Charly 1978
- Katinka 1988
- Dansen med Regitze (Memories of a Marriage, Waltzing Regitze) 1989
- Den goda viljan (The Best Intentions), 1992
- Riget (The Kingdom, International title) 1994–97, TV series
- Hamsun (1996)
- Edderkoppen (The Spider) (2000), TV series
- Rejseholdet (Unit 1, International English title) 2000, TV series
- Hjælp, Jeg er en Fisk (Help! I'm a Fish!) 2000, voice of Aunt Anna, the Eel
- Fire høytider (Four Festivals) 2000, TV mini-series
- Grev Axel (Count Axel): 2001, role of Baronesse Gjerløv
- En kort, en lang (Shake It All About, International English title) 2001
- Kokken (The Cook): (2002)
- Arsenik og gamle kniplinger (Arsenic and Old Lace) 2002, TV, role of Abby Brewster.
- Arven (The Inheritance, European English title) (2003)
- Ørnen: En krimi-odyssé (The Eagle: A Crime Odyssey) (2004), TV series
- O' Horten (2007)
- Maria Larssons eviga ögonblick (2008)
- Jauja (2014)
- Silent Heart (2014)
- Key House Mirror (2015)
- Før frosten (2018)

She has additionally provided Danish voice to the following Disney animation films Pocahontas, Lady and the Tramp II, Pocahontas II: Journey to a New World, Mulan, The Emperor's New Groove, and Mulan II.

== Awards ==
- 2006: Ibsen Centennial Commemoration Award
