= List of Danish films of the 1960s =

The following table is a list of films produced in Denmark or in the Danish language during the 1960s. For an alphabetical list of all Danish films currently on Wikipedia see Category:Danish films. For Danish films from other decades see the Cinema of Denmark box above.

Danish Title	English Title	Director(s)	Cast	Genre	Notes
1960
Tro, håb og trolddom	Faith, Hope and Witchcraft	Erik Balling	Bodil Ipsen	Family film	Entered into the 10th Berlin International Film Festival
Sømand i knibe		Lau Lauritzen Jr.	Lau Lauritzen Jr., Ebbe Langberg, Hans Kurt, Ghita Norby	Family film	
Soldaterkammerater på vagt	Operation Camel	Sven Methling	Carl Ottosen		
Den sidste vinter	The Last Winter	Frank Dunlop, Anker Sørensen, Edvin Tiemroth			Entered into the 2nd Moscow International Film Festival
1961
Harry og kammertjeneren	Harry and the Butler	Bent Christensen	Osvald Helmuth; Ebbe Rode, Gunnar Lauring	Comedy	nominated for Academy Award for Best Foreign Language Film and entered into the 1962 Cannes Film Festival
Mine tossede drenge		Sven Methling			
Peters baby					
Cirkus Buster					
Reptilicus		Poul Bang		Horror	
Gøngehøvdingen					
1962
Den kære familie		Erik Balling			Entered into the 3rd Moscow International Film Festival
Duellen		Knud Leif Thomsen			Entered into the 12th Berlin International Film Festival
Prinsesse for en dag					
1963
Gaden Uden Ende	Street Without End	Mogens Vemmer	Sunny Nielsen	Documentary Drama	Bodil Award for Best Danish Film
1964
Kampen om Næsbygaard			Inger Stender		
Mord for åbent tæppe			Inger Stender		
Don Olsen kommer til byen		Anker Sørensen	Dirch Passer, Buster Larsen, Inger Stender	Comedy	
Gertrud	Gertrud	Carl Theodor Dreyer	Nina Pens Rode, Bendt Rothe, Baard Owe	Drama	Dreyer's last film
Selvmordsskolen	School for Suicide	Knud Leif Thomsen			Entered into the 14th Berlin International Film Festival
Tine	Tine	Knud Leif Thomsen			Entered into the 4th Moscow International Film Festival
To	To	Palle Kjærulff-Schmidt			Entered into the 15th Berlin International Film Festival
1965
Næsbygaards arving			Inger Stender		
Slå først Frede!	Strike First Freddy	Erik Balling	Morten Grunwald, Ove Sprogøe	Eurospy Comedy	
Sytten	Eric Soya's '17'	Annelise Meineche	Ole Søltoft, Ghita Nørby	Comedy	Based on the novel by Carl Erik Soya
1966
Krybskytterne på Næsbygaard			Inger Stender		
Sult	Hunger	Henning Carlsen			Entered into the 1966 Cannes Film Festival
Naboerne	Neighbours	Bent Christensen			Entered into the 5th Moscow International Film Festival
Slap af, Frede!	Relax Freddie	Erik Balling	Morten Grunwald, Ove Sprogøe	Eurospy Comedy	
1967
Historien om Barbara	Story of Barbara	Palle Kjærulff-Schmidt			Entered into the 17th Berlin International Film Festival
Mennesker mødes og sød musik opstår i hjertet	People Meet and Sweet Music Fills the Heart	Henning Carlsen	Harriet Andersson, Preben Neergaard	Romantic comedy	Bodil Award for Best Danish Film (1968)
1968
Det er så synd for farmand					
Min søsters børn vælter byen					
Det kære legetøj	Danish Blue	Gabriel Axel	Birgit Brüel	Documentary; Propaganda	Advocated legalization of pornography
Doktor Glas	Doctor Glas	Mai Zetterling			Listed to compete at the 1968 Cannes Film Festival
Tur i natten		Ole Roos	Bendt Rothe, Poul Thomsen	Horror, Short	
1969
Den gale dansker					
Balladen om Carl-Henning	Ballad of Carl-Henning	Lene Grønlykke, Sven Grønlykke			Entered into the 19th Berlin International Film Festival
Ta' lidt solskin					
Trekanter	Threesome	Brandon Chase	Judith M. Brown, Jørgen Kiil, Marianne Tholsted	Erotica Drama	
Midt i en jazztid					
Manden der tænkte ting	The Man Who Thought Life	Jens Ravn			Entered into the 1969 Cannes Film Festival
Klabautermannen	We Are All Demons	Henning Carlsen			Entered into the 19th Berlin International Film Festival
Midt i en jazztid	Jazz All Around	Knud Leif Thomsen			Entered into the 6th Moscow International Film Festival
