= The Moelleby Affair =

1976 film

- Directed by: Tom Hedegaard
- Written by: Henning Bahs; Erik Balling; Tom Hedegaard; Morten Korch
- Produced by: Bo Christensen
- Starring: Poul Reichhardt
- Cinematography: Claus Loof
- Edited by: Ole Steen Nielsen
- Distributed by: Nordisk Film
- Release date: 26 December 1976
- Running time: 95 minutes
- Country: Denmark
- Language: Danish

The Moelleby Affair (Danish: Affæren i Mølleby) is a 1976 Danish family film directed by Tom Hedegaard and starring Poul Reichhardt.

== Cast ==
- Poul Reichhardt as Borgmester Clemmensen
- Ove Sprogøe as Digter Mortensen
- Elin Reimer as Borgmesterfruen
- Dick Kaysø as Ivar
- Chili Turèll as Clara (as Inge Margrethe Svendsen)
- Lily Broberg as Kommunekasserens værtinde
- Arthur Jensen as Barber Nikolajsen
- Karl Stegger as Morbror Ole
- Edvin Tiemroth as Overretssagfører Kølle
- Ole Søltoft as Kølles søn
- Henning Palner as Ditlefsen
- Bjørn Puggaard-Müller as Bankdirektør Lund
- Ejner Federspiel as Assessor Godtfredsen
- Poul Thomsen as Due
- Jens Okking as Lang
- Christoffer Bro as Ingeniør
- Valsø Holm as Restauratør
- Kirsten Søberg as Hansigne
- Elga Olga Svendsen as Dame på rådhuset
- Else Petersen as Godtfredsens sekretær
- Jørgen Beck as Betjent
