= Seksdagesløbet =

1958 film

- Directed by: Jørgen Roos
- Written by: Erik Balling; Tørk Haxthausen
- Starring: Poul Reichhardt
- Cinematography: Poul Pedersen
- Distributed by: Nordisk Film
- Release date: 18 August 1958
- Running time: 97 minutes
- Country: Denmark
- Language: Danish

Seksdagesløbet is a 1958 Danish drama film directed by Jørgen Roos and starring Poul Reichhardt.

== Cast ==
- Poul Reichhardt as Ivan Reimer
- Lily Broberg as Lillian
- Flemming Larsen as Kristian Reimer
- Jørgen Reenberg as Otto Bertelsen
- Preben Kaas as Benny Brun
- Nino Orsini as Bandini
- Ole Larsen as Torkild
- Paul Hagen as Søren Kristensen
- Bent Christensen s Kurt
- Kjeld Petersen as Larsen
- Judy Gringer as Tove
- Vivi Bach as Marianne (as Vivi Bak)
- Henny Lindorff Buckhøj as Karla
- Valsø Holm as Karlas mand
- Ulrik Neumann as Tilskuer
- Kai Holm as Proprietær
- Jørn Jeppesen as Arrangøren
- Knud Schrøder as Banelægen
- Mogens Brandt as Journalist Sivertsen
- Ejner Federspiel as Tilskuer
- Ellen Margrethe Stein as Tilskuer
- Mimi Heinrich as Yrsa
- Jørgen Buckhøj as Rockeren Erik
- Guglielmo Inglese as Peppo
- Frank Holms as Müller
- Gustl Weishappel as Schmidt
- Roger Maridia as Lecourt
- Louis Viret as Viret
- Michel Hildesheim as Billetsjoveren
- Klaus Nielsen as Knud
- Birgit Zacho as Pige med laktaske
- Erik Gutheil as Speaker
- Peter Kitter as Radiospeaker
- Jørgen Beck as Løbskommissær
