= South of Tana River =

- Directed by: Bent Christensen; Henry Geddes; Sven Methling
- Written by: Finn Holten Hansen
- Produced by: Finn Aabye; Henning Karmark
- Starring: Poul Reichhardt
- Cinematography: Henrik Fog-Møller; Erik Jensen
- Release date: 20 December 1963
- Running time: 84 minutes
- Country: Denmark
- Language: Danish

South of Tana River (Danish: Syd for Tana River) is a 1963 Danish family film directed by Bent Christensen and starring Poul Reichhardt.

== Cast ==
- Poul Reichhardt as Axelson
- William Rosenberg as Schmidt
- Axel Strøbye as Derek
- Bent Christensen as Dupont
- Charlotte Ernst as Eva Axelson
- Terry Mathews as Hitching
- Ronald Burgess as Game Warden
