= Familien Gyldenkål =

1975 film by Gabriel Axel

- Poster by Aage Lundvald
- Directed by: Gabriel Axel
- Written by: Poul-Henrik Trampe
- Produced by: Just Betzer
- Starring: Axel Strøbye, Kirsten Walther
- Cinematography: Henning Christiansen
- Music by: Søren Christensen
- Release date: 1975
- Running time: 92 min.
- Country: Denmark
- Language: Danish

Familien Gyldenkål (transl. The Goldcabbage Family) is a 1975 Danish comedy film directed by Gabriel Axel.

It was the first in a series of three films about the eccentric Gyldenkål family, and was followed by The Goldcabbage Family Breaks the Bank (1976) also directed by Axel, and Familien Gyldenkål vinder valget (1977) directed by Bent Christensen.

== Cast ==
- Axel Strøbye
- Kirsten Walther
- Birgitte Bruun
- Martin Miehe-Renard
- Karen Lykkehus
- Bertel Lauring
- Ove Sprogøe
- Lily Broberg
- Jens Okking
- Karl Stegger
- Brigitte Kolerus
- Helle Merete Sørensen
- Bjørn Puggaard-Müller
- Otto Brandenburg
- Lisbet Dahl
- Claus Ryskjær
- Hans Christian Ægidius
- Tommy Kenter
- Hardy Rafn
- Benny Hansen
- Ebba With
- Jens Brenaa
- Poul Thomsen
- Gyda Hansen
- Ernst Meyer
- Søren Rode
- Karl Gustav Ahlefeldt
