= Philipsen =

Philipsen is a surname. Notable people with the surname include:

- Andy Philipsen (1939–1985), Canadian politician
- Constantin Philipsen (1859–1925), Danish photographer and cineaste
- Gerry Philipsen (born 1944), American ethnographer of communication
- Jasper Philipsen (born 1998), Belgian cyclist
- Jette Philipsen, Danish cricketer
- Preben Philipsen (1910–2005), Danish film producer, son of Constantin
- Theodor Philipsen (1840–1920), Danish painter
