= Hagbard and Signe =

1967 film by Gabriel Axel

- Film poster
- Directed by: Gabriel Axel
- Written by: Gabriel Axel; Saxo Grammaticus; Frank Jæger
- Produced by: Benedikt Árnason; Gösta Bergqvist; Just Betzer; Johan Bonnier; Bent Christensen
- Starring: Oleg Vidov
- Cinematography: Henning Bendtsen
- Edited by: Lars Brydesen
- Music by: Per Nørgård
- Distributed by: ASA Film
- Release date: 16 January 1967
- Running time: 100 minutes
- Countries: Denmark; Sweden; Iceland
- Language: Danish

Hagbard and Signe or The Red Mantle (Danish: Den røde kappe, Swedish: Den röda kappan, Icelandic: Rauða skikkjan) is a 1967 internationally co-produced drama film based on the story of Hagbard and Signy from the twelfth-century work Gesta Danorum by Saxo Grammaticus, directed by Gabriel Axel and starring Gitte Hænning. The film was shot in Iceland, with interiors built and filmed in Nacka, Sweden.

== Plot ==
In medieval Iceland, (Note: The place of the action is not stated in the film. Most reviewers identify the setting as Iceland, where the film's exterior shots were filmed. Saxo Grammaticus' telling is set in Zealand.) Hagbard, son of King Hamund, arrives with his two brothers to avenge his father's murder by King Sigvor. The feud is to be settled by a duel: Sigvor's own three sons against Hamund's. After a day's fighting, no clear victor has emerged. Amid general exhaustion, Sigvor interrupts the duel and offers to end the feud peacefully, inviting Hamund's sons to his estate. They accept and the group departs in celebratory mood.

At the estate, the brothers are treated as guests. Hagbard is immediately smitten with Sigvor's daughter Signe, who is being unsuccessfully courted by treacherous nobleman Hildegisl. Hagbard and Signe secretly meet outside the estate at night; Signe reciprocates Hagbard's feelings and they promise themselves to each other. A suspicious Hildegisl follows Hagbard and covertly learns of the affair. As a feast is held to celebrate the reconciliation of the two houses, Hildegisl attempts to intimidate Hagbard, who dismisses him. Hildegisl then bribes Bolvis, Sigvor's corrupt advisor, to arrange the death of Hamund's sons.

While Hagbard is away on a hunt with fellow suitor Hake, Bolvis spreads slander which provokes the remaining men into a duel. Despite promises of a fair fight, Sigvor's sons dishonourably gang up on Hagbard's brothers. Hagbard rushes to the duelling grounds just in time to see his brothers killed. Joined by Hildegisl, Sigvor's sons also fight Hagbard, but he prevails and kills all except Hildegisl, who escapes to inform the king. Hagbard briefly meets Signe and promises he will return for her before fleeing from Sigvor's approaching party. Hildegisl claims, with Bolvis as his witness, that Hamund's sons were the aggressors; in response, Sigvor proclaims Hagbard to be an outlaw.

Hagbard seeks refuge in his late father's estate. He tells his mother of a dream, which she interprets as foretelling he will win Signe at the cost of his own life. He nevertheless commits to finding Signe. Borrowing his mother's red mantle, Hagbard disguises himself as a woman, "Gunhild", and enters Sigvor's estate as a servant. That night, he joins Signe in her chamber. They make love, and vow to escape together in the morning. Signe declares that, if anything should happen to Hagbard, she will join him in death.

Hildegisl discovers "Gunhild's" horse is in fact Hagbard's. He has head servant Bengerd retrieve Hagbard's sword and inform Sigvor of the deception. Sigvor's forces gather outside Signe's chamber and, after many casualties, finally apprehend Hagbard. Hagbard is briskly tried, Bolvis successfully pressing for death, despite the protests of Hake and Bolvis' brother Bilvis. Sigvor's wife hands Hagbard a drink she says will brace him for "the flames of Hell"; he replies tauntingly and spills the drink over her.

Preparations are made for Hagbard to be hanged from a prominent tree as Signe watches from her chamber. Hagbard asks his executioners for a final favour: to give him a view of his own death by first hanging his red mantle. They acquiesce. Taking the mantle for Hagbard, Signe sets fire to her chamber and commits suicide. Hagbard sees the rising flames and, satisfied that Signe has kept her promise, allows himself to be hanged.

== Cast ==
- Oleg Vidov as Hagbard
- Gitte Hænning as Signe
- Eva Dahlbeck as The Queen
- Birgitte Federspiel as King Hamund's widow
- Lisbeth Movin as Bengerd
- Johannes Meyer as Bilvis
- Håkan Jahnberg as Bolvis
- Manfred Reddemann as Hildegisl
- Henning Palner as Hake
- Gisli Alfredsson as Sigvald
- Folmer Rubæk as Helvin
- Borgar Garðarsson as Alf (as Borgar Gardarsson)
- Jörgen Lantz as King Hammond (as Jørgen Lantz)
- Frederik Tharaldsen as Alger
- Sisse Reingaard as Rigmor
- Gunnar Björnstrand as King Sigvor
- Niels Hinrichsen
- Else Højgaard
- Jakob Nielsen
- Poul Reichhardt

== Reception ==
The film won a Technical Prize (Mention spéciale du grand prix technique) at the 1967 Cannes Film Festival. Roger Ebert gave the film a full 4 stars out of 4 score in his 1968 review.

== See also ==
- Germanic Heroic Age
- Late Antiquity
- List of historical period drama films
