= Puk Schaufuss =

Danish actress (born 1943)

Puk Schaufuss (born Liselotte Schaufuss 15 September 1943 in Copenhagen) is a Danish actress.

She was educated at the acting school of the Royal Danish Theatre in 1965, among her fellow students were Jesper Langberg. She was a part of the ensemble of the Royal Theatre until 1990. Her debut was as Agnete in Elverhøj.

She was married to the actor and entertainer Preben Uglebjerg, their marriage lasted one year until his death in 1968. Among her best-known film roles are her appearances in the Morten Korch screen adaptations Der brænder en ild (A fire is burning) and De røde heste (The red horses), and in the Danish soap opera Hvide løgne (White lies).

Her parents were ballet master Frank Schaufuss and solo dancer Mona Vangsaae. Her brother is ballet dancer Peter Schaufuss.

== Selected filmography ==
- Der brænder en ild – 1962
- De røde heste – 1968
