= Ghost Train International =

Spøgelsestoget
- Poster
- Directed by: Bent Christensen
- Written by: Bent Christensen; Leif Panduro
- Starring: Dirch Passer
- Cinematography: Henning Kristiansen
- Edited by: Anker Sørensen
- Music by: Søren Christensen
- Distributed by: Saga A/S,
- Release date: August 13, 1976
- Country: Denmark
- Language: Danish language

Spøgelsestoget (English title: Ghost Train International) is a 1976 Danish family film directed by Bent Christensen. It is based on Arnold Ridley's 1923 play The Ghost Train.

== Cast ==
- Dirch Passer as Theodor 'Teddy' T. Thönder
- Kirsten Walther as Juliane de Preiss
- Axel Strøbye as Chauffør Heinz-Otto von Münsterland
- Preben Kaas as Richard Winther
- Lisbet Dahl as Else Winther
- Clara Østø as Frk. Erna Bunsen
- Bjørn Puggaard-Müller as Stationsforstander ved Falck
- Otto Brandenburg as Den mystiske Hr. K.
- Ole Monty as Stationsfunktionær
- Bent Christensen as Stationsfunktionær
- Preben Mahrt as Stationsfunktionær
- Kai Løvring as Opdager
- Hans Christian Ægidius
- Lars Lunøe as Mystisk togpassager
- Leif Panduro as Mand der skubber trækvogn
