= Der brænder en ild =

1962 film

- Film poster
- Directed by: Alice O'Fredericks; Robert Saaskin
- Written by: Alice O'Fredericks; Jens Dennow
- Based on: Der Brænder en Ild (1920) by Morten Korch
- Produced by: Henning Karmark
- Starring: Poul Reichhardt; Bodil Udsen; Ib Mossin; William Rosenberg
- Cinematography: Steini Sveinbjørnsson
- Edited by: Wera Iwanouw
- Music by: Erik Jensen; Sven Gyldmark
- Production company: ASA Filmudlejning
- Distributed by: ASA Filmudlejning
- Release date: 12 February 1962
- Running time: 108 minutes
- Country: Denmark
- Language: Danish

Der brænder en ild (A Fire is Burning) is a 1962 Danish family-comedy-drama film based on the 1920 book of the same name by novelist Morten Korch. Directed by Alice O'Fredericks and Robert Saaskin, the movie stars Poul Reichhardt, Bodil Udsen, Ib Mossin and William Rosenberg.

The film is set in 1920 and follows the return of Martin, a charismatic outdoorsman who returns to his old farm and home after working abroad in Greenland for nine years. He reunites with his former love Martha, but is heartbroken to discover she ended up marrying his old friend Just. Although having initially planned to use his savings to start up his own machine station, Martin decides to help out the hardworking Just in settling his many debts and loans. Just, however, is extremely hesitant to accept financial aid from a former boyfriend of Martha's. Subplots concern the romantic interest of Henrik and Jesper, both farmworkers who develop a feud over a woman.

The motion picture premiered in Copenhagen and Aarhus cinemas on 12 February 1962 and became a critical and major commercial success. Production and distribution was done by ASA Film. Like several other films adapted by Korch's popular family novels, the film developed a cult following and is regarded as one of the best from the Korch-era.

== Plot ==
After working in Greenland for almost nine years, Martin (Poul Reichhardt) returns in 1920 to his childhood home, hoping to benefit from the short-lived economic boom following the First World War.

He takes a quick tour of the now-industrialized city and greets his old friends at the inn, and then visits his puppy love Martha (Astrid Villaume). She is delighted to see him, but tells him she has married someone else. Fearing Martin's reaction, she decides not to mention her spouse is Martin's childhood comrade Just (William Rosenberg), a stubborn and hardworking farmer. Upon learning of this, Martin becomes emotionally frustrated. Even so, he accepts Just's offer of work and accommodation at his farm. He learns that Just is in conflict with his uncle Bent (Jørn Jeppesen), co-owner of the farm, who wants to sell the property before their money situation worsens. Just angrily resists, hoping to borrow money from the bank to tide them over.

Meanwhile, young farmworkers Henrik (Ib Mossin) and Jesper (Bertel Lauring) share a romantic interest in Just and Martha's daughter Inge (Puk Schaufuss). Henrik asks Inge to accompany him to a party in the city, but she declines, insisting she has to work that night. Henrik becomes angry when he later sees Inge at the party with Jesper. Henrik confronts Inge and demands an explanation while Jesper, who is drunk, visits the restroom. Inge explains she was not planning on attending, but changed her mind at the last minute. Henrik and Inge enjoy themselves on the dance floor. As the drunken Jesper makes his way back to Inge, he is pulled aside by Erna (Birthe Lundsgaard), who informs him that she is pregnant with his child. Jesper denies being the only man to have had sex with Erna, a statement that enrages her. When Jesper says he intends to do nothing, Erna slaps him. Jesper loses his temper and grabs Erna by the wrists. Erna, in tears, tells Jesper she knows he is trying to seduce Inge and calls him a playboy. Insulted, Jesper returns to the dance floor, only to find Inge embracing and kissing Henrik. A fight breaks out, and Jesper and Henrik are kicked out of the party.

Back at the farm, Just and his wife meet with their attorney H. C. Holm (Knud Hallest), who tells them the bank will never lend them money as long as they have unpaid loans. Fearing eviction, Martha goes to Martin to ask for help. Out of his feelings for Martha, Martin agrees to loan them about 40,000 Kroner. His pride hurt, Just refuses to accept help, especially from Martin, who he accuses of flirting with his wife. Martha decides to set parts of the farm on fire, hoping to collect the insurance money. When Just's best horse becomes trapped in the flames, Martin delivers the suffering horse a coup de grâce. When Martha learns that the farm was not sufficiently damaged for an insurance claim, she decides to try again. By chance, Martin discovers the second "accident", and puts the fire out. He becomes suspicious when he finds the remains of a candle and some old newspapers. Fearing Martha had something to do with it, he tells no one.

As a few weeks have passed, Bent informs Just he will declare bankruptcy on behalf of the farm unless he sells. With little choice, Just ends up accepting Martin's money. Martin ends up marrying Martha's friend Karen (Birgit Sadolin), who has been infatuated with him since his return. At the same time, Inge enthusiastically accepts Henrik's marriage proposal. Sober and ashamed of his actions, Jesper declares he will accept responsibility for his child with Erna, but he cannot marry her, because his mother would never accept it.

== Cast ==
- Poul Reichhardt as Martin
- Astrid Villaume as Martha Hovmann
- William Rosenberg as Just Hovmann
- Birgit Sadolin as Karen
- Ib Mossin as Henrik
- Puk Schaufuss as Inge Hovmann
- Jørn Jeppesen as Bent Nisted
- Bertel Lauring as Jesper
- Birthe Lundsgaard as Erna
- Knud Hallest as H.C. Holm

== Production ==
The motion picture was directed by Alice O'Fredericks with assistance from Robert Saaskin. The film's manuscript, a copy of which is held at the Danish Film Institute, was finished by O'Fredericks after original scriptwriter Jens Dennow died in a plane accident along with his wife Gerda Neumann. The highly experienced Henning Karmark was the head producer of the film. Cinematography was done by Steini Sveinbjørnsson and editing by Wera Iwanouw. The Danish film studio ASA Filmudlejning and its staff handled distribution and promotion. The farm seen in the film had previously been used in other similar motion pictures.

== Release and reception ==
The film was released on 12 February 1962 in Copenhagen and Aarhus cinemas. It received positive reviews and was an enormous box office success. Film critic Marie Lorentzen gave the movie five out of six stars, saying "Der Brænder en Ild is filled with excitement and problems, and is one of the more serious Morten Korch films. The story is a great deal about love and what love can make you do". Journalist Svend Kragh-Jacobsen of Berlingske wrote a favorable review of the film on its release date. Film reviewer Lone Pedersen called the film "a good and solid screen version of a Morten Korch novel" and gave the movie four out of five stars. The film is, alongside other O'Fredericks projects such as De Røde Heste (1950) and Vagabonderne på Bakkegården (1958), regarded as a classic film from the Korch-era. The film was distributed to home media on DVD in 2003 and again in 2014 by Nordisk Film.

== See also ==
- Det skete på Møllegården
- Kampen om Næsbygård

== Sources ==
- Pedersen, Paw (2012). Direktor Lau Lauritzen (in Danish). Books on Demand. ISBN 978-87-7114-705-6.
- Piil, Morten (2008). Gyldendals Danske Filmguide (in Danish). Gyldendal. ISBN 978-87-02-06669-2.
- Wesche, Anne-Sofie (2013). Poul Reichhardt: Blot et Menneske (in Danish). Gyldendal. ISBN 978-87-02-14677-6.
