= Sømænd og svigermødre =

1962 film

- Directed by: Bent Christensen
- Written by: Solveig Ersgaard; Arvid Müller
- Produced by: Finn Aabye
- Starring: Dirch Passer
- Cinematography: Rudolf Frederiksen
- Edited by: Wera Iwanouw
- Distributed by: ASA Film
- Release date: 6 August 1962
- Running time: 82 minutes
- Country: Denmark
- Language: Danish

Sømænd og svigermødre (transl. Sailors and mothers-in-law) is a 1962 Danish comedy film directed by Bent Christensen and starring Dirch Passer.

== Cast ==
- Dirch Passer - Kanusti Mogensen
- Ove Sprogøe - Peter Jensen
- Kjeld Petersen - Henry Middelboe
- Jessie Rindom - Emma Middelboe
- Lily Broberg - Tante Rosa
- Lone Hertz - Bitten Middelboe
- Judy Gringer - Yvonne
- Aase Werrild - Fru Kjær
- Svend Methling - Pastor Kræns
- Knud Hilding - Kollega til Henry
- Hardy Rafn - Bageren
