= Panic in Paradise =

Panic in Paradise may refer to:

- Panic in Paradise (film), a 1960 Danish film
- Panic in Paradise: Florida's Banking Crash of 1926, a 2007 book by Vic Vickers
- Naughty Bear: Panic in Paradise, a 2012 video game, a sequel to Naughty Bear
