= The Goldcabbage Family Breaks the Bank =

Familien Gyldenkål sprænger banken
- Directed by: Gabriel Axel
- Written by: Poul-Henrik Trampe
- Produced by: Just Betzer
- Starring: Axel Strøbye, Kirsten Walther
- Cinematography: Henning Christiansen
- Edited by: Sven Methling
- Music by: Bent Fabricius-Bjerre
- Release date: 1975
- Running time: 80 minutes
- Country: Denmark
- Language: Danish

Familien Gyldenkål sprænger banken (transl. "The Goldcabbage Family Breaks the Bank") is a 1976 Danish comedy film directed by Gabriel Axel.

It was the second in a series of three films about the eccentric Gyldenkål family, a sequel to Familien Gyldenkål (1975) also directed by Axel, and followed by Familien Gyldenkål vinder valget (1977) directed by Bent Christensen.

== Cast ==
- Axel Strøbye
- Kirsten Walther
- Birgitte Bruun
- Martin Miehe-Renard
- Karen Lykkehus
- Jens Okking
- Bertel Lauring
- Sejr Volmer-Sørensen
- Ole Monty
- Grethe Sønck
- Kjeld Nørgaard
- Gyrd Løfqvist
- Poul Thomsen
- Birger Jensen
- William Kisum
- Gabriel Axel
