= Løgismose =

Danish food company

- Company type: Private
- Industry: Food and Beverage
- Founded: 1965
- Headquarters: Funen, Denmark
- Area served: Denmark
- Key people: Jeppe Grønlykke
- Products: Delicacies, wine
- Website: www.loegismose.dk

Løgismose is a Danish food company producing and retailing delicacies and other products under its own brand. The company has the subsidiaries: Løgismose Wine, and Løgismose Dairy, and also controls Falsled Kro on Funen and the Michelin-starred restaurant Kong Hans Kælder in Copenhagen. It also operates a delicacy store in Copenhagen and another in Aarhus, and has online sales. In 2011 it entered into collaboration with the discount supermarket chain Netto which launched a product line under the Løgismose brand in 2010. The company is now part of Løgismose Meyers

== History ==
Løgismose was founded by Sven and Lene Grønlykke, who abandoned a career in film-making to instead become culinary entrepreneurs, naming their enterprise after Løgismose Castle on the Danish island of Funen which they had acquired in 1965 In 1970 they acquired the local Haarby Dairy, then faced with closure, and Falsled Kro, a run-down country inn which they converted into a French gourmet restaurant which introduced La Nouvelle cuisine to Denmark under the leadership of French chef Michel Michaud. Produce was at first flown in from Paris but was increasingly provided from their own estate and local producers. They also imported French wines, mainly Beaujolais, introducing George Duboeuf's wines to the Danish market.

== Ownership ==
The company was purchased by IK Partners and merged with most of Claus Meyer's culinary activities to form Løgismose Meyers in 2015,

== Business Activities ==
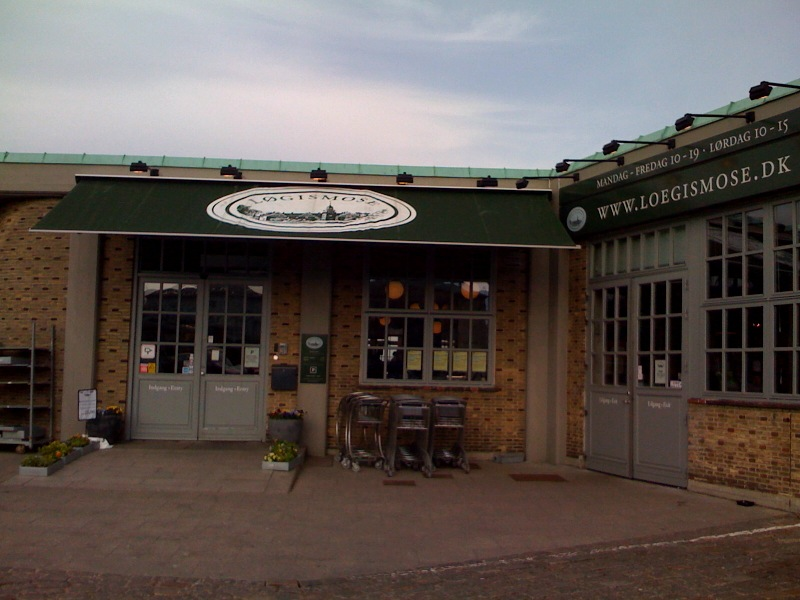
Løgismose at Nordre Toldbod

Løgismose has sold its products from a delicacy store at the Copenhagen waterfront since 1982. The firm also has a delicacy store in Aarhus.

Løgismose Dairy was founded by Sven Grønlykke in 1969 in the former premises of Haarby Dairy. Produce has been organic since 1990. The company is now based in the former Allested Dairy in Allested.
