= Hans-Henrik Krause =

Danish actor

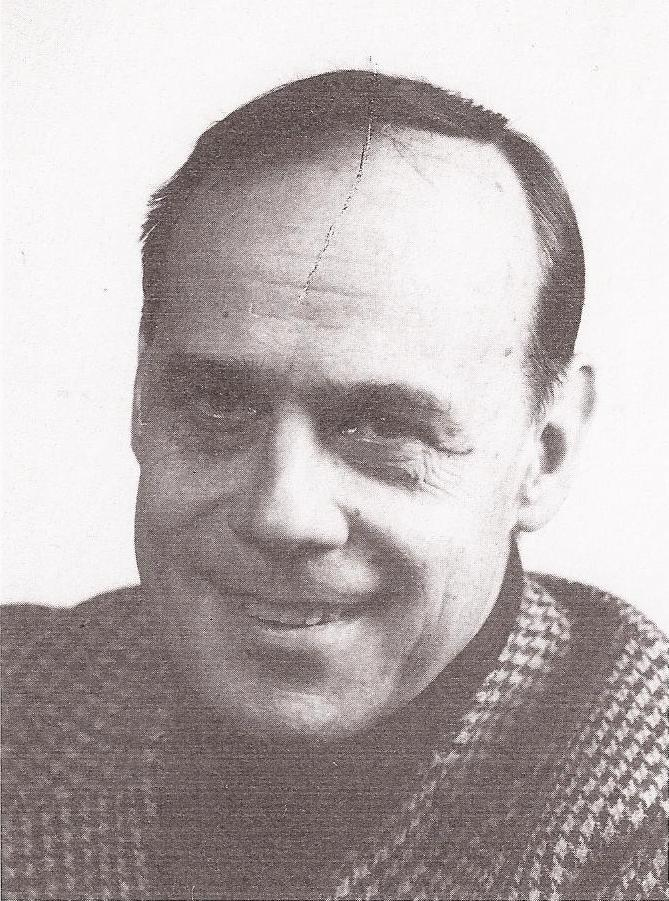
- Born: 13 March 1918; Hellerup, Denmark
- Died: 15 April 2002 (aged 84); Frederiksberg, Denmark
- Occupations: Actor; Film director
- Years active: 1942-1992

Hans-Henrik Krause (13 March 1918 – 15 April 2002) was a Danish actor and film director. He appeared in 29 films between 1942 and 1992. He was born in Hellerup, Denmark.

== Filmography ==
- Planetens spejle (1992)
- Mord i Paradis (1988)
- Peter von Scholten (1987)
- Snart dages det brødre (1974)
- I Adams verden (1973)
- Fru Geesches frihed (1973)
- Man sku være noget ved musikken (1972)
- Sejle op ad åen (1972)
- Laila Løvehjerte (1972)
- Den forsvundne fuldmægtig (1971)
- Hyp lille Lotte (1970)
- Dimensionspigen (1970)
- Værelset (1970)
- Præriens skrappe drenge (1970)
- Pigen fra Egborg (1969)
- Smukke-Arne og Rosa (1967)
- Historien om Barbara (1967)
- I stykker (1966)
- Sorte Shara (1961)
- Himlen er blaa (1954)
- Sønnen (1953)
- Nålen (1951)
- Tre år efter (1948)
- Ditte menneskebarn (1946)
- I gaar og i morgen (1945)
- Otte akkorder (1944)
- Elly Petersen (1944)
- Det kære København (1944)
- Damen med de lyse Handsker (1942)
