= Birgitte Federspiel =

Danish actress (1925–2005)

Birgitte Federspiel (6 September 1925 – February 2, 2005) was a Danish film, theater and TV actress. She won two Bodil Awards for best actress in 1955 (Ordet) and 1959 (En fremmed banker på).

Born Karen Birgitte Federspiel in Copenhagen, she was the daughter of actor Ejner Federspiel and Gunver Fönss. She had a notable film roles as Inger in Ordet (1955) and, in later life, as Martine in Babette's Feast (1987), while on TV she played Baroness von Rydtger in three episodes of Matador. She died in Odense on February 2, 2005, aged 79.

== Personal life ==
She was married to Danish actors Freddy Koch and Jens Østerholm.

== Selected filmography ==
- Jens Langkniv (1940)
- Ta' briller på (1942) – Birgit Ernst
- Jeg mødte en morder (1943) – Pige på cykel (uncredited)
- En ny dag gryer (1945) – Pige i venteværelse
- I de lyse nætter (1948) – Grethe
- For frihed og ret (1949) – Dronningens kammerpige
- Susanne (1950) – Doris Rudholt
- Familien Schmidt (1951) – Gerd Møller
- Kærlighedsdoktoren (1952) – Arkæologi-Magisteren Bente Berg
- Adam og Eva (Adam and Eve) (1953) – Tove
- Ordet (1955) – Inger Borgen (uncredited)
- Kispus (1956) – Dora
- Vi som går stjernevejen (1956) – Nana
- En kvinde er overflødig (1957) – Ester
- Amor i telefonen (1957) – Misse Lieberg
- En fremmed banker på (1959) – Vibeke
- Charles' tante (Charles' Aunt) (1959) – Donna Lucia d'Alvadorez / Lise Holm
- Den sidste vinter (The Last Winter) (1960) – Anne Sørensen
- Komtessen (1961) – Gevinde Sonja Hardenborg
- Gøngehøvdingen (The Musketeers) (1961) – Kulsoen
- Drømmen om det hvide slot (1961) – Fru Strand
- Dronningens vagtmester (1963) – Kulsoen
- Hvis lille pige er du? (1963) – Fru Jansen
- Gudrun (Suddenly, a Woman!) (1963) – Husværtinden
- Døden kommer til middag (Death Comes at High Noon) (1964) – Merete Lindberg
- Tine (1964) – Fru Berg
- Dyden går amok (1966) – Inga Forstmand
- Sult (Hunger) (1966) – Her sister
- Søskende (1966) – Irene
- Den røde kappe (Hagbard and Signe or The Red Mantle) (1967) – King Hamund's widow
- Og så er der bal bagefter (1970) – Astrid
- Z.P.G. (1972) – Psychiatrist
- Olsen Banden går amok (The Olsen Gang Goes Crazy) (1973) – Ragna
- Nitten røde roser (19 Red Roses) (1974) – Louise Bech
- Nøddebo Præstegård (1974) – Fru Blicher
- Den korte sommer (1976) – Silden
- Julefrokosten (1976) – Asta Asmussen
- Nyt legetøj (1977) – Anna
- Pas på ryggen, professor (Mind Your Back, Professor) (1977) – Ægtepar i kunstforretning / kone
- Firmaskovturen (1978) – Frk. Asmussen
- Fængslende feriedage (1978) – Cornelia Møller
- Min farmors hus (1984)
- Sidste akt (1987) – Tante Laura
- Sidste akt (1987) – Lotta Henderson
- Peter von Scholten (1987) – Dronning Caroline Amalie
- Babettes gæstebud (Babette's Feast) (1987) – Martine
- Carlo og Ester (1994) – Viola
- Barbara (1997) – Ellen Katrine
- Lykkefanten (1997) – Mormor
- Forbudt for børn (1998) – Grandmother
- Kat (film) (2001) – Gundine
