= Jetpiloter =

1961 film

- Directed by: Anker Sørensen
- Written by: Basil Dawson; Bob Ramsing; Tage Vandsted
- Produced by: Preben Philipsen
- Starring: Ebbe Langberg
- Cinematography: Erik Overbye
- Edited by: Lars Brydesen
- Release date: 4 September 1961
- Running time: 78 minutes
- Country: Denmark
- Language: Danish

Jetpiloter is a 1961 Danish family film directed by Anker Sørensen and starring Ebbe Langberg.

== Cast ==
- Ebbe Langberg - Flyverløjtnant Ras
- Henning Palner - Flyverløjtnant Jan
- Poul Reichhardt - Oberstløjtnant Bording
- Henning Moritzen - Kaptajn Tom Jessen
- Malene Schwartz - Lise Jessen
- Ib Mossin - Flightcommander Pau
- Birthe Wilke - Birthe Pau
- Susse Wold - Grethe
- William Kisum - Flyverløjtnant Sid
- Jørgen Buckhøj - Flyverløjtnant Pen
- Poul Schleisner - Kaptajnløjtnant Jok
- Peter Marcell - Flyveleder i kontroltårn
- Anker Taasti - Sergent Røj
- Bent Thalmay - Instruktør i træningsfly
- Ove Rud - Chefen på MTB'erne
- Frank Pilo - Chefen's næstkommanderende
- Baard Owe - Flyverlæge
- Helge Scheuer - Sergent
- Kurt Erik Nielsen - En overfenrik
- Klaus Nielsen - Pilot i eskadrille 794
- Morten Grunwald - Pilot i eskadrille 794
- Lise Henningsen - Sygeplejerske
- Hugo Herrestrup
