= Michel Michaud =

French chef

Michel Michaud (born 1946) is a French chef who brought French cuisine to Denmark in 1971. Gaining wide acclaim for gourmet cuisine in restaurants across the country, he moved to Ruth's Hotel in Skagen in 2004.

== Biography ==
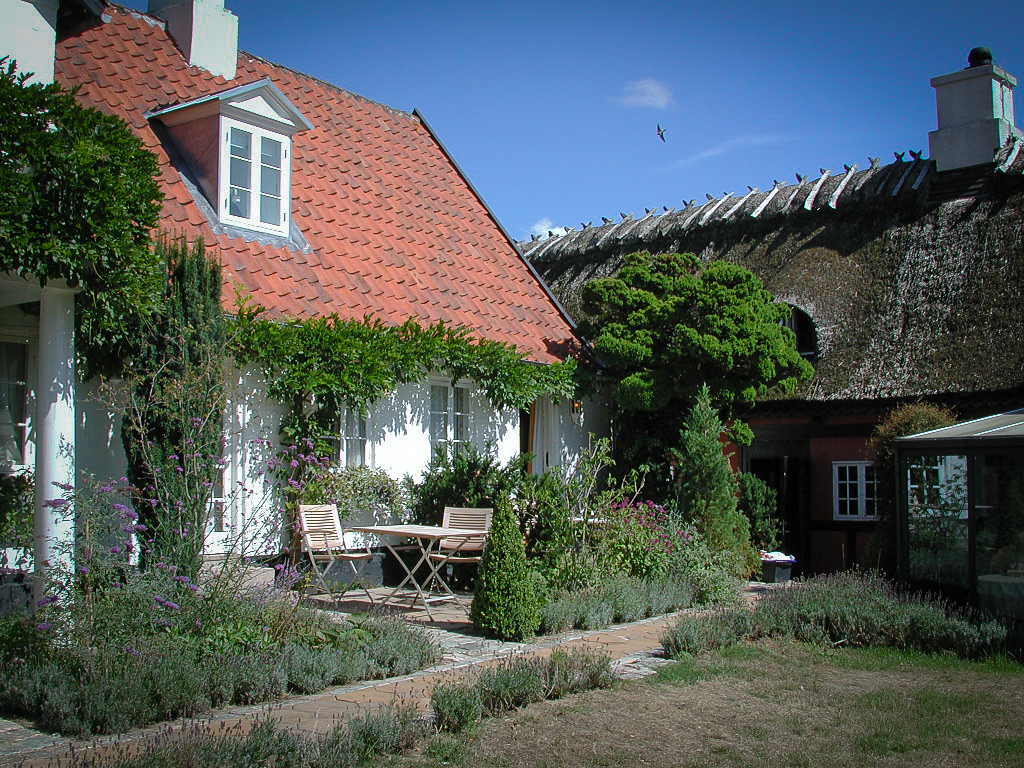
Falsled Kro

Born in Cognac in the French department of Charente, at the age of 15 he trained as a chef at Tarbes. He went on to work in Saintes, Cahors and at Avallon in Burgundy where he joined the Michelin-starred restaurant Hostellerie de la Poste.

He arrived in Denmark in 1971, where he worked for Sven and Lene Grønlykke, first in Falsled Kro on Funen and then at Kong Hans Kælder in Copenhagen. Michaud brought French cuisine to Denmark, impacting trends in gastronomy. After a spell in Cologne and at La Table des Cordeliers in Condom, he returned to Denmark, where he worked at Søllerød Kro, earning his first Michelin star in 1986, then at Restaurant Gammel Åbyhøj in Aarhus and Restaurant Marie Louise in Odense before beginning his term in Skagen in 2004. He has been widely acclaimed for his dishes in Ruths Brasserie which always meet the highest standards.

In November 2013, it was announced that Michaud who arrived at Ruth's Hotel in 2004 would retire at the end of the year. He will continue to live in Skagen with his wife Annick and will go on producing his famous combinations of herbs and his Gâteau Marcel.

== Awards ==
In addition to receiving Michelin stars for his restaurants in 1982, 1986 and 1987, Michaud has received an array of prestigious awards including the Order of the Dannebrog and the French Ordre National du Mérite (both in 2008).

== Bibliography ==
- Michaud, Michel (2000). Mine livretter (in Danish). L&R Fakta. ISBN 978-87-614-0167-0.
- Moltke-Leth, Edit; Henriksen, Poul Ib; Michaud, Michel (2007). Ruths Hotel & Michel Michaud. Bonniers Bogklubber. ISBN 978-87-604-2890-6.
