= Jørgen Buckhøj =

Danish actor (1935–1994)

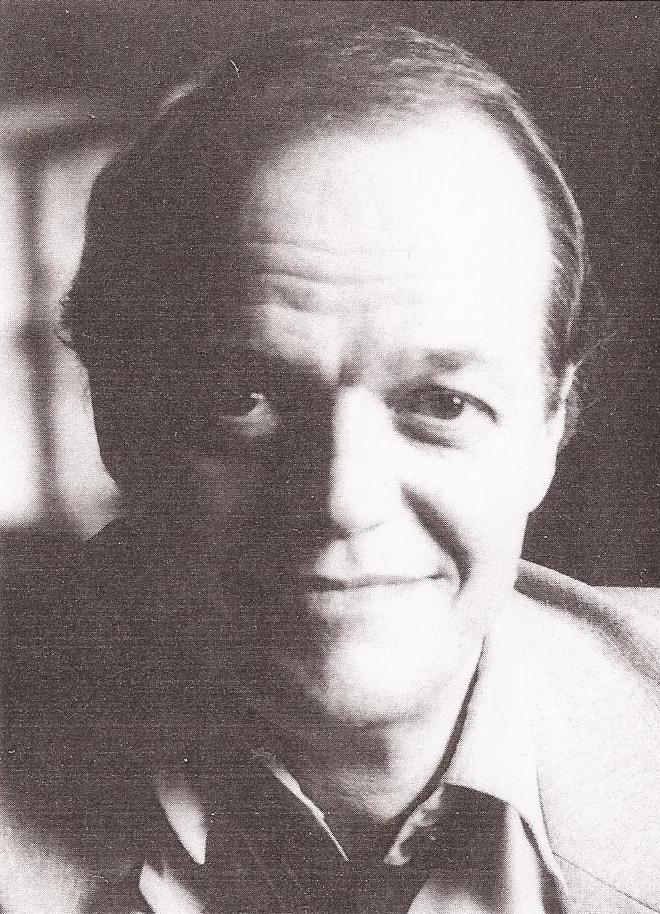
- Born: 10 January 1935; Aarhus, Denmark
- Died: 13 April 1994 (aged 59); Copenhagen, Denmark
- Occupation: Actor
- Years active: 1953–1977

Jørgen Buckhøj (10 January 1935 – 13 April 1994) was a Danish actor, working on stage, TV and film. He is best known as the title character Mads Skjern (born Mads Andersen-Skjern) in Matador. He appeared in 38 films between 1953 and 1977.

He was born and died in Denmark. His parents were actors Henny Lindorff Buckhøj and Per Buckhøj.

== Filmography ==
- Pas på ryggen, professor (1977)
- Ægteskabet mellem lyst og nød (1975)
- Anne og Paul (1975)
- Gamle dage (1974)
- Syg og munter (1974)
- Snart dages det brødre (1974)
- Bulen (1973)
- Tango (1973)
- Næsehornet (1972)
- Teknikerne (1972)
- Huset i baggården (1971)
- Til lykke Hansen (1971)
- Nattens frelse (1971)
- Forfremmelsen (1971)
- Dimensionspigen (1970)
- The Only Way (1970)
- Værelset (1970)
- Nøglen til paradis (1970)
- Arseniktimen (1970)
- Bella (1970)
- De unge på 80 (1970)
- Tænk på et tal (1969)
- Henrik IV (1968)
- Min søsters børn på bryllupsrejse (1967)
- Smukke-Arne og Rosa (1967)
- Historien om Barbara (1967)
- Støv for alle pengene (1963)
- Gudrun (1963)
- Landsbylægen (1961)
- Far til fire med fuld musik (1961)
- Soldaterkammerater på efterårsmanøvre (1961)
- Sorte Shara (1961)
- Jetpiloter (1961)
- Skibet er ladet med (1960)
- Seksdagesløbet (1958)
- Bundfald (1957)
- Gengæld (1955)
- Adam og Eva (1953)
