= Lady in the Spa =

1929 film

- Directed by: Edmund Hahn
- Starring: Maximilian Kraemer; Betty Bird; Helen von Münchofen; Oskar Marion
- Cinematography: Josef Ambor; Hans Fürbas
- Production company: Listo Film
- Distributed by: Vereinigte Star-Film
- Release date: 20 August 1929 (Austria)
- Country: Austria
- Languages: Silent; German intertitles

Lady in the Spa (German:Madame im Strandbad) is a 1929 Austrian silent comedy film directed by Edmund Hahn and starring Maximilian Kraemer, Betty Bird and Helen von Münchofen. A small spa town tries to give the impression that it is actually a much more important place than it really is.

== Cast ==
- Maximilian Kraemer as Journalist
- Betty Bird as Mabel Smith
- Helen von Münchofen as Yvette
- Oskar Marion as Der Sekretär
- Robert Garrison as Jonathan Goldfisch
- Albert Paulig as Der Badeddirektor
- Leo Salvotti as Jonathan Gold

== Bibliography ==
- Prawer, S.S. Between Two Worlds: The Jewish Presence in German and Austrian Film, 1910-1933. Berghahn Books, 2005.
