= Løgismose Meyers =

Food company in Copenhagen, Denmark

Lemvigh-Müller
- Company type: Løgismose Meyers
- Industry: Food
- Founded: 2015
- Headquarters: Copenhagen, Denmark
- Key people: Tørk Eskild Furhauge (CEO), Jørn Tolstrup Rohde (chairman)
- Products: Food products
- Services: Foodservice
- Revenue: DKK 1,004 million (2015)
- Number of employees: 985 (2015)
- Website: www.loegismosemeyers.dk

Løgismose Meyers is a food company based in Copenhagen, Denmark. It produces and purveys a wide range of food products under the Løgismose and Meyers brands and is also active in the market for foodservice. It owns the chains Meyers Bageri (Meyer's Bakery), Meyers Diner and Meyers Madhus.

== History ==
The company was established by IK Investment Partners after it had acquired Løgismose from the Grønløkke family as well as most of Claus Meyer's culinary activities. Tørk Eskild Furhauge succeeded Steen Halbye as CEO in September 2016.

== Activities ==
Løgismose has a strategic partnership with Dansk Supermarked and Meyers has a strategic partnership with Coop Danmark.

Meyers Contract Catering is the operator of canteens, restaurants, cafés and bars. Meyers Køkken caters for companies and private customers. Meyers Bageri is a chain of organic bakeries in Copenhagen. Meyers Deli operates two sites.
