= Ego Brønnum-Jacobsen =

Danish actor (1905–1978)

- Born: 24 March 1905; Copenhagen, Denmark
- Died: 25 March 1978 (aged 73); Denmark
- Occupation: Actor
- Years active: 1942-1974

Ego Brønnum-Jacobsen (24 March 1905 – 25 March 1978) was a Danish film actor. He appeared in 30 films between 1942 and 1974. He was born in Copenhagen, Denmark and died in Denmark.

== Filmography ==
- Syg og munter (1974)
- Mindesmærket (1972)
- Rektor på sengekanten (1972)
- Pelsen (1971)
- Olsen-banden (1968)
- Mig og min lillebror (1967)
- Landsbylægen (1961)
- Mine tossede drenge (1961)
- Komtessen (1961)
- Panik i paradis (1960)
- Paw (1959)
- Vi er allesammen tossede (1959)
- Mariannes bryllup (1958)
- Laan mig din kone (1957)
- Mig og min familie (1957)
- Kristiane af Marstal (1956)
- Bruden fra Dragstrup (1955)
- Det er så yndigt at følges ad (1954)
- Dorte (1951)
- Mød mig paa Cassiopeia (1951)
- Unge piger forsvinder i København (1951)
- Op og ned langs kysten (1950)
- Shakespeare og Kronborg (1950)
- Lyn-fotografen (1950)
- De pokkers unger (1947)
- Lykke på rejsen (1947)
- Baby på eventyr (1942)
- Vi kunde ha' det saa rart (1942)
- Natekspressen P903 (1942)
- Ta' briller på (1942)
