= Josef Ambor =

British cinematographer

Josef Ambor (28 July 1908 - 1970) was a British cinematographer.

== Selected filmography ==
- Lady in the Spa (1929)
- The Case of Charles Peace (1949)
- The Floating Dutchman (1952)
- Wide Boy (1952)
- Dangerous Voyage (1954)
- The Brain Machine (1955)
- Little Red Monkey (1957)
- The Strange World of Planet X (1958)
- Wrong Number (1959)
- A Car For All Reasons, Range Rover Promotional Video (1971) - cinematographer
