= Helen von Münchofen =

Danish actress (1904–1956)

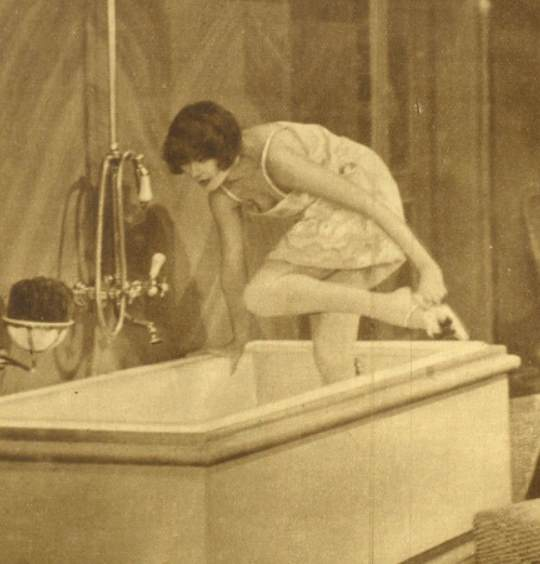
- Born: 19 February 1904; Copenhagen, Denmark
- Died: 1956 (aged 51–52)
- Other name: Helen Halkier (birth name)
- Occupation: Actress
- Years active: 1927–1935 (film)

Helen von Münchofen (often spelt Helen von Muenchhofen) (1904–1956) was a Danish-German film actress. She was born in Copenhagen, but later moved to Germany, where she embarked on a career in films. She played a small part in Fritz Lang's Metropolis in 1927, but then gained more substantial roles in silent films of the late 1920s. Following the Nazi rise to power in 1933 she returned to Denmark, where she appeared in Pál Fejös's The Golden Smile (1935).

Her daughter, Helen von Münchofen became an actress as well. Her granddaughter Suzanne Doucet, is an actress, musician, singer and composer.

== Selected filmography ==
- Queen of the Boulevards (1927)
- Storm Tide (1927)
- Metropolis (1927)
- The Girl Without a Homeland (1927)
- Give Me Life (1928)
- Lady in the Spa (1929)
- The Golden Smile (1935)

== Bibliography ==
- Büttner, Elisabeth, ed. (2004). Paul Fejos: Die Welt macht Film. Vienna: Verlag Filmarchiv Austria. ISBN 978-3-901932-31-1.
