= Yvonne Ingdal =

Danish actress (1939–2022)

- Born: 10 December 1939; Denmark
- Died: 6 February 2022 (aged 82)
- Occupation: Actress
- Years active: 1963–1974

Yvonne Ingdal (10 December 1939 – 6 February 2022) was a Danish actress. She has appeared in 22 films and televisions shows between 1963 and 1974. She starred in the 1964 film To, which was entered into the 15th Berlin International Film Festival. Ingdal died on 6 February 2022, at the age of 82.

== Selected filmography ==
- Suddenly, a Woman! (1963)
- To (1964)
- 4x4 (1965)
- Once There Was a War (1966)
- Elvira Madigan (1967)
- Story of Barbara (1967)
- Kisses Right and Left (1969)
- Love Is War (1971)
- Tatort: Kressin stoppt den Nordexpress (1971)
