= Oskar (film) =

1962 film

- Film poster
- Directed by: Gabriel Axel
- Written by: Bob Ramsing
- Produced by: Erik Overbye
- Starring: William Bewer
- Cinematography: Henning Bendtsen
- Edited by: Lars Brydesen
- Music by: Ib Glindemann
- Release date: 12 October 1962
- Country: Denmark
- Language: Danish

Oskar is a 1962 Danish comedy film based upon the play by Claude Magnier, directed by Gabriel Axel and starring William Bewer.

== Plot ==
An ambitious young man, who is a real office rat, tells his boss he is in love with the latter's daughter.

== Cast ==
- William Bewer as chauffeur
- Vera Gebuhr as Charlotte
- Judy Gringer as Tina
- Lone Hertz as Vibeke Bang
- Ebbe Langberg as Oskar
- Ghita Nørby as Eva Hansen
- Dirch Passer as Martin Kristiansen
- Birgitte Reimer as Mona Bang
- Ove Sprogøe as Bernhard Bang
- Axel Strøbye as Egon Larsen
