= Over Holluf =

- Town
- Location in Region of Southern Denmark Over Holluf (Denmark)
- Coordinates: 55°21′32″N 10°28′27″E
- Country: Denmark
- Region: Southern Denmark
- Municipality: Odense Municipality

Area
  - Total: 0.7 km^{2} (0.27 sq mi)

Population (2026)
  - Total: 1,502
  - Density: 2,100/km^{2} (5,600/sq mi)

Over Holluf is a small town in Odense Municipality on the island of Funen, Denmark. It is located in Fraugde Parish approximately 8 kilometers southeast of the Odense city center. As of 1 January 2026, Over Holluf had a population of 1,502. The area is most renowned as the birthplace of author Morten Korch in 1876.

== History ==
In 1484, Holluf was an estate under cultivation by Jørgen Marsvin. References to two separate farms under the names Upper and Lower Holluf are first noted in 1500. In the early 1530s the area was owned and operated by the Dalum Monastery before it returned to private ownership. By 1664, the area consisted of 6 residences and 11 farms. By 1844, the area consisted entirely of private lands.
