= Lars Lunøe =

Danish actor (1936–2023)

- Born: 19 April 1936; Copenhagen, Denmark
- Died: 9 October 2023 (aged 87); Copenhagen, Denmark
- Occupation: Actor

Lars Lunøe (19 April 1936 – 9 October 2023) was a Danish actor. He is known for his roles in the television series Grundtvigs drøm (1983) and Gøngehøvdingen (1992).

Lunøe was educated at Aarhus Theater's student school in 1960. After several years of employment at the theatre, he established himself as a freelance actor. He died in Copenhagen on 8 October 2023, at the age of 87.

== Selected filmography ==
=== Films ===
- 1964: Måske i morgen
- 1967: Story of Barbara
- 1968: Doctor Glas
- 1968: 2 - I, a Woman, Part II
- 1969: The Man Who Thought Life
- 1970: Tough Guys of the Prairie
- 1970: Nana
- 1971: Gold for the Tough Guys of the Prairie
- 1974: Pigen og drømmeslottet
- 1976: Ghost Train International
- 1977: Havoc
- 1986: Early Spring
- 1989: Kærlighed uden stop
- 2002: Facing the Truth
- 2004: Aftermath

=== Television series ===
- 1967: Ka' De li' østers
- 1977–1980: En by i provinsen
- 1983: Grundtvigs drøm
- 1992: Gøngehøvdingen

=== Television films ===
- 1969: Det er måske det, der har gjort os så smukke
- 1976: Ministeren og døden
- 1976: En ægtemand
- 1983: Stiftelsen
- 1983: For menneskelivets skyld
