= Finn Aabye =

Danish film producer (born 1935)

- Born: 7 July 1935 (age 91); Hellerup, Denmark
- Occupation: Film Producer

Finn Aabye (born 7 July 1935) is a Danish film producer. He was the former director of the Danish Film Institute.

== Career ==
Aabye began working in film in 1958 as a bookkeeper at Rialto Film, a company owned by Preben Philipsen. In 1961 he became a freelance production manager, and in 1962 he co-founded Bent Christensen Filmproduktion.

During the 1960s he worked as producer on a number of Danish feature films, including and Sømænd og svigermødre (1962), and Kampen om Næsbygaard (1964) (1967).

Aabye became director of the distributor ASA Filmudlejning, and later of the wider ASA group. From 1976 to 1988 Aabye was director of the Danish Film Institute, succeeding Leif Feilberg. He was succeeded by Mona Jensen.

Until 1998 he was director of Saga Video and Prisme Film, which produced short films for Statens Filmcentral and television. His later production credits include the documentaries Babylon i Brøndby (1996), Rejsen med Mai (1997) and Ib Schønberg (2000).

== Selected filmography ==
Year	Title	Role	Notes
1961	Harry og kammertjeneren	Production manager	Feature film
1962	Sømænd og svigermødre	Production manager	Feature film
1962	Weekend	Production manager	Feature film
1962	Svinedrengen og Prinsessen på ærten	Production manager	Short film
1963	Støvsugerbanden	Production manager	Feature film
1964	To	Producer	Feature film
1964	Kampen om Næsbygaard	Producer	Feature film
1966	Krybskytterne på Næsbygaard	Producer	Feature film
1966	Ih, du forbarmende!	Production manager	Feature film
1967	Brødrene på Uglegaarden	Production manager	Feature film
1996	Babylon i Brøndby	Producer	Documentary; produced by Saga Video & Kortfilm
1997	Rejsen med Mai	Producer	Documentary
2000	Ib Schønberg	Producer	Documentary about actor Ib Schønberg

=== Television ===
Year	Title	Role	Notes
2006	Historien bag kameraet	Himself	Television documentary
