= Lone Hertz =

Danish actress (born 1939)

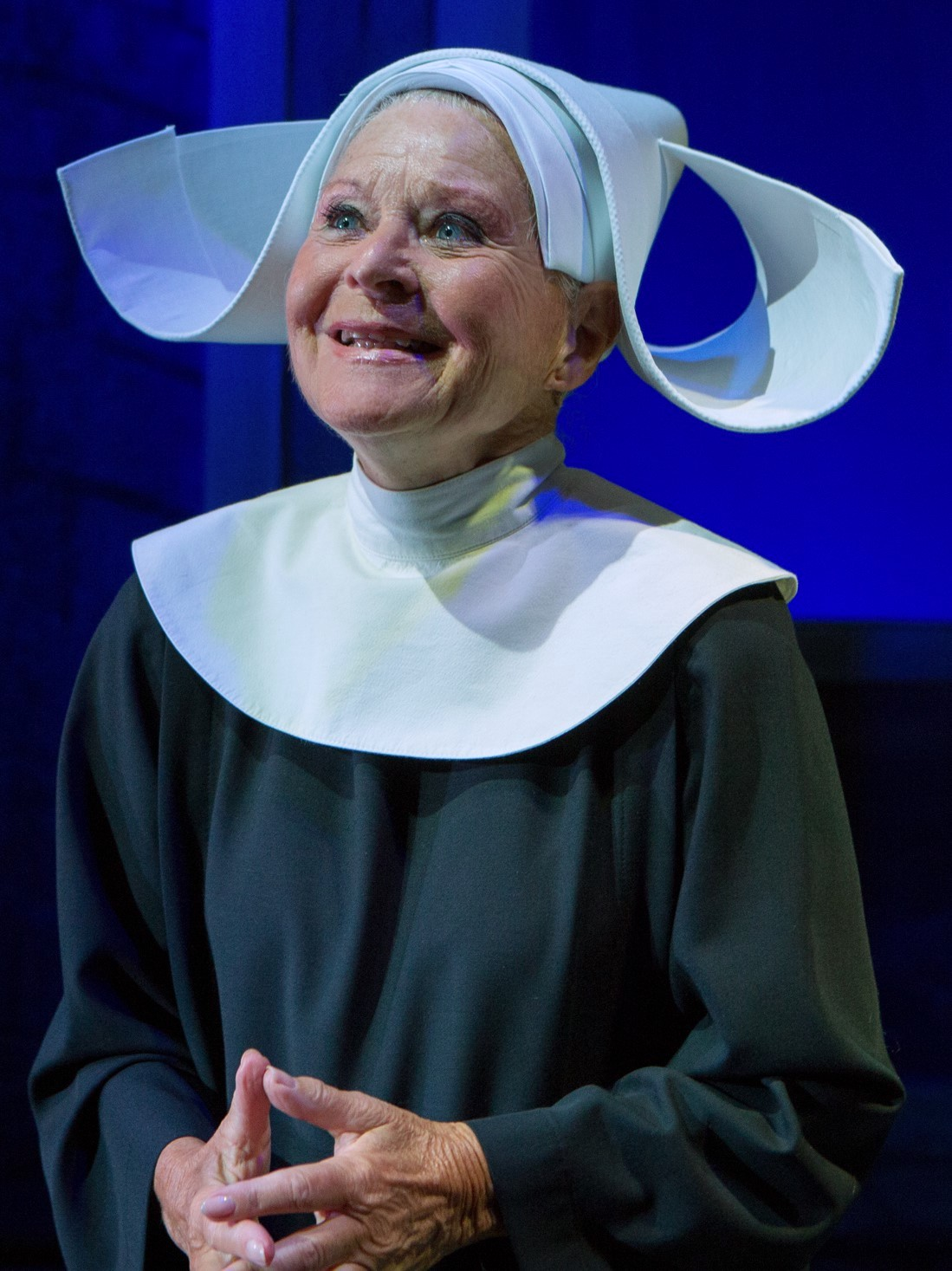
- Lone Hertz in Mam'zelle Nitouche, 2016.
- Born: 23 April 1939 (age 85); Copenhagen, Denmark
- Occupation: Actress
- Years active: 1951–present

Lone Hertz (born 23 April 1939) is a Danish film actress. She has appeared in more than 40 films since 1951.

== Filmography ==
- Bella, min Bella (1996)
- Når engle elsker (1985)
- Den korte sommer (1976)
- Me, Too, in the Mafia (1974)
- Erasmus Montanus (1973)
- Takt og tone i himmelsengen (1972)
- Joan (1972)
- Hurra for de blå husarer (1970)
- Nøglen til paradis (1970)
- Frøken Rosita – Blomsternes sprog (1970)
- Mej och dej (1969)
- Dyrlægens plejebørn (1968)
- Doktor Glas (1968)
- Tre mand frem for en trold (1967)
- Utro (1966)
- Landmandsliv (1965)
- Et fjernsynsmareridt (1964)
- Sommer i Tyrol (1964)
- Tine (1964)
- Slottet (1964)
- Selvmordsskolen (1964)
- Bussen (1963)
- Skyggen af en helt (1963)
- Frøken Nitouche (1963)
- Sikke'n familie (1963)
- Vi har det jo dejligt (1963)
- Oskar (1962)
- Recensenten og dyret (1962)
- Sømænd og svigermødre (1962)
- Den kære familie (1962)
- Det tossede paradis (1962)
- Enetime (1962)
- Stuepigerne (1962)
- Landsbylægen (1961)
- To skøre ho'der (1961)
- Pigen i søgelyset (1959)
- Bundfald (1957)
- Ta' Pelle med (1952)
- Vores fjerde far (1951)
- Hold fingrene fra mor (1951)
