= Malene Schwartz =

Danish actress (born 1936)

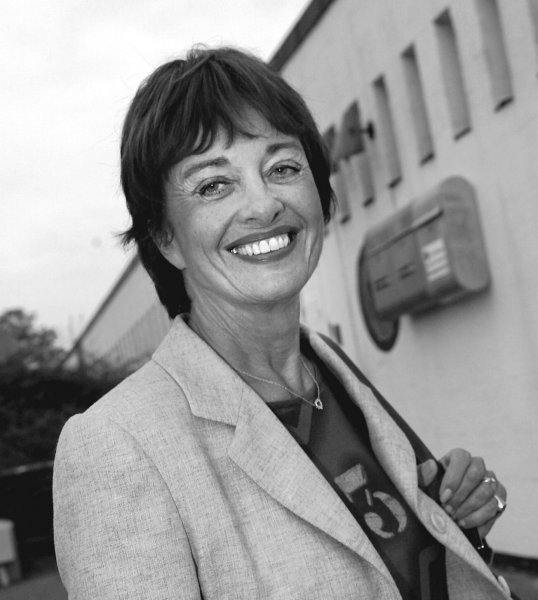
- Born: 10 August 1936 (age 90); Frederiksberg, Denmark
- Occupation: Actress
- Years active: 1955–present

Malene Schwartz (born 10 August 1936) is a Danish film actress. She has appeared in more than 60 films and television shows since 1955. In the TV series Matador she played the role of Maude Varnæs. She was born in Frederiksberg, Denmark.

== Partial filmography ==
- Hvorfor stjæler barnet? (1955)
- A Little Nest (1956)- Christl
- Den kloge mand (1956)
- Natlogi betalt (1957) - Inga
- Englen i sort (1957) - Sygeplejerske
- Det lille hotel (1958) - Marianne
- Soldaterkammerater (1958) - Ellens stemme (voice, uncredited)
- Parasitterne (1958, TV Movie) - Gudrun
- Sjove år, De (1959) - Lene
- Komtessen (1961) - Betina Mortensen
- Min kone fra Paris (1961) - Kirsten Dreyer
- Jetpiloter (1961) - Lise Jessen
- Sorte Shara (1961) - Chefens kone
- Landsbylægen (1961) - Anne-Mette Krogh
- Duellen (1962) - Tina
- Prinsesse for en dag (1962) - Mette Jansen
- Den rige enke (1962) - Grete Ellekjær
- Venus fra Vestø (1962) - Nicola Egede-Schack
- Drømmen om det hvide slot (1962) - Susanne Strand
- Frøken April (1963) - Frk. April Bergen
- Frøken Nitouche (1963) - Corinna
- Bussen (1963) - Else
- Slottet (1964) - Bente Falke
- Eurydike (1964, TV Movie) - Eurydike
- Halløj i himmelsengen (1965) - Jeanette
- Pigen og millionæren (1965)
- Jag - en kvinna (1965) - Britta
- Tre små piger (1966) - Marie
- Pigen og greven (1966) - Irene Gyvelstjerne
- Copenhagen Design (1967, TV Short)
- Min kones ferie (1967) - Antikvitetshandlerske Tenna
- En spurv i tranedans (1968, TV Movie) - Louise
- Jeg elsker blåt (1968) - Gerd
- Ægteskabet mellem lyst og nød (1975, TV Movie) - Babette
- Tro, håb og kærlighed (1984) - Kirsten's mother
- Mors dag (1996, TV Movie) - Margit
- Arsenik og gamle kniplinger (2002, TV Movie) - Martha Brewster
- Dykkerdrengen (2003, Short) - Farmor
- Reconstruction (2003) - Fru Banum (Mrs. Banum)
- Flammen & Citronen (2008) - Gilbert's Kone
