= Peter S. Andersen =

Danish actor

- Born: 31 January 1871; Denmark
- Died: 30 May 1948 (aged 77); Denmark
- Occupation: Actor
- Years active: 1911-1944

Peter S. Andersen (31 January 1871 – 30 May 1948) was a Danish actor. He appeared in more than 40 films between 1911 and 1944.

== Selected filmography ==
- The Golden Smile (1933)
- Life on the Hegn Farm (1938)
