= Queen of the Boulevards =

1927 film directed by Manfred Noa

- Werner Fuetterer and Helen von Münchhofen
- Directed by: Manfred Noa
- Written by: Joseph Than; Honoré de Balzac (story)
- Starring: Paul Wegener; Andrée Lafayette; Werner Fuetterer
- Cinematography: Franz Planer
- Music by: Giuseppe Becce
- Production company: Noa-Film
- Distributed by: Bavaria Film
- Release date: 7 July 1927
- Running time: 100 minutes
- Country: Germany
- Languages: Silent; German intertitles

Queen of the Boulevards (German: Glanz und Elend der Kurtisanen) is a 1927 German silent drama film directed by Manfred Noa and starring Paul Wegener, Andrée Lafayette and Werner Fuetterer. It is based on the novel Splendeurs et misères des courtisanes by Honoré de Balzac. It was shot at the Staaken Studios in Berlin, and distributed by the Munich-based Bavaria Film. Art direction was by Otto Erdmann and Hans Sohnle.

== Cast ==
- Paul Wegener as Collin / Marquis de Herrera
- Andrée Lafayette as Renée
- Werner Fuetterer as Lucien
- Nien Soen Ling as Paccard
- Kurt Gerron as Niccinger
- Helen von Münchofen as Coralie
- Eugen Burg as Grad-lieu
- Elly Leffler
- Ferdinand von Alten as Serizy

== Bibliography ==
- Bock, Hans-Michael & Bergfelder, Tim. The Concise CineGraph. Encyclopedia of German Cinema. Berghahn Books, 2009.
