= Erik Overbye =

Danish film producer (1934–2020)

- Born: 6 December 1934; Copenhagen, Denmark
- Died: 25 August 2020 (aged 85)
- Occupation: Film producer
- Years active: 1961–1981

Erik Overbye (6 December 1934 – 25 August 2020) was a Danish film producer. He produced 15 films between 1961 and 1981. Overbye also directed the 1961 Danish film Komtessen. He was born in Copenhagen, Denmark on 6 December 1934, and died on 25 August 2020, at the age of 85.

== Filmography ==
- Landsbylægen (1961)
- Det tossede paradis (1962)
- Oskar (1962)
- Drømmen om det hvide slot (1962)
- Vi har det jo dejligt (1963)
- Frøken April (1963)
- Bussen (1963)
- Selvmordsskolen (1964)
- Slottet (1964)
- Prinsessen rejser (1967)
- Mig og mafiaen (1973)
- Mafiaen - det er osse mig! (1974)
- Sådan er jeg osse (1980)
- Danmark er lukket (1980)
- Langturschauffør (1981)
