= Love Is War (1970 film) =

1970 film

- Directed by: Ragnar Lasse Henriksen
- Written by: Ragnar Lasse Henriksen
- Produced by: Ragnar Lasse Henriksen
- Starring: Yvonne Ingdal
- Cinematography: Ragnar Lasse Henriksen
- Edited by: Ragnar Lasse Henriksen
- Release date: 26 December 1970
- Running time: 96 minutes
- Country: Norway
- Language: Norwegian

Love Is War is a 1970 Norwegian drama film directed by Ragnar Lasse-Henriksen. It was entered into the 21st Berlin International Film Festival where it won a Silver Bear for an outstanding single achievement.

== Cast ==
- Yvonne Ingdal as Gro
- Ole-Jørgen Nilsen as Espen
- Per Oscarsson as Mann med ønskekvist
- Jarl Strømsborg as Espen as a kid
- Vibeke Løkkeberg as Espen's mother
- Tor Stokke as Espen's father
- Majken Kruse as Naked girl in the window
- Bonne Gauguin as Gros mor
- Per Tofte as Fiolinisten
- Alf Malland as Doctor
