= John Price (Danish actor) =

Danish actor

- Born: 15 September 1913; Copenhagen, Denmark
- Died: 10 December 1996 (aged 83); Copenhagen, Denmark
- Occupations: Actor; Film director
- Years active: 1934–1982

John Price (15 September 1913 – 10 December 1996) was a Danish film actor and director, and the father of Danish screenwriter Adam Price. He appeared in 26 films between 1934 and 1982.

== Selected filmography ==
- The Golden Smile (1935)
- Blaavand melder storm (1938)
- Champagnegaloppen (1938)
- Meet Me on Cassiopeia (1951)
- Duellen (1962)
- Tine (1964)
- Der var engang (1966 – directed)
- Neighbours (1966)
- The Man Who Thought Life (1969)
