= The Castle (1964 film) =

1964 film

- Directed by: Anker Sørensen
- Written by: Ib Henrik Cavling
- Produced by: Erik Overbye
- Starring: Malene Schwartz
- Cinematography: Henning Bendtsen
- Edited by: Lars Brydesen
- Music by: Ib Glindemann
- Release date: 3 July 1964
- Running time: 82 minutes
- Country: Denmark
- Language: Danish

The Castle (Danish: Slottet) is a 1964 Danish family film directed by Anker Sørensen and starring Malene Schwartz.

== Cast ==
- Malene Schwartz as Bente Falke
- Poul Reichhardt as Henrik Stenfeldt
- Lone Hertz as Mariann Falke
- Mimi Heinrich as Regitse
- Henning Palner as Bill
- Olaf Ussing as Kammerherren
- Bodil Steen as Husholderske Madsen
- Inge Ketti as Stuepigen Nelly
- Karl Stegger as A.H. Jessen
- Hannah Bjarnhof as Iversen
- Preben Mahrt as Fætter Hans
- Preben Neergaard as Konrad Jørling
- Ole Monty as Butler Thomas
- Bent Vejlby as Østergaard
- Bjørn Puggaard-Müller as Grossereren
- Eigil Reimers as Fabrikant
- Knud Hallest as Præst
- Klaus Nielsen as Gårdskarlen Anton
- Ib Glindemann as Trumpetplayer in band (uncredited)
