= Wrong Number (1959 film) =

British film by Vernon Sewell

- DVD cover
- Directed by: Vernon Sewell
- Written by: James Eastwood; Norman Edwards
- Produced by: Nat Cohen; Stuart Levy; Jack Greenwood
- Starring: Peter Reynolds; Lisa Gastoni; Olive Sloane
- Cinematography: Josef Ambor
- Edited by: Derek Holding
- Production company: Merton Park Studios Productions
- Distributed by: Anglo-Amalgamated Film Distributors
- Release date: 28 June 1959
- Running time: 60 minutes
- Country: United Kingdom
- Language: English

Wrong Number is a 1959 British second feature crime film directed by Vernon Sewell and starring Peter Reynolds, Lisa Gastoni and Olive Sloane. It was written by James Eastwood and Norman Edwards.

== Plot ==
Dr. Pole's gang hijacks a mail van, and one of the van drivers is killed by gang-member Angelo. Miss Crystal, an eccentric elderly lady, recalls once hearing Angelo's name mentioned when she mistakenly telephoned Dr. Pole's telephone number, and helps the police capture the gang.

== Cast ==
- Peter Reynolds as Angelo
- Lisa Gastoni as Maria
- Peter Elliott as Dr. Pole
- Olive Sloane as Miss Crystal
- Paul Whitsun-Jones as Cyril
- Barry Keegan as Max
- John Horsley as Superintendent Blake
- Harold Goodwin as Bates
- David Davenport as Sergeant Jones
- Catharina Ferraz as Mrs. Landi
- John Grima as Albin
- Arthur Lovegrove as Saunders

== Production ==
It was produced at Merton Park Studios in London. The film's sets were designed by the art director Wilfred Arnold.

== Critical reception ==
The Monthly Film Bulletin wrote: "A routine crime thriller, not always persuasive (the robbery scenes are quite unconvincing) and – apart from Olive Sloane's amusingly larger-than-life character study – uninteresting in performance."

Picturegoer wrote: "The mail-van robbery that goes awry isn't new in itself. But the pay-off to this neatly tailored thriller is nicely ingenious ... The thieves, who inevitably fall out among themselves, are efficiently played ... while Olive Sloane overacts with relish the part of the old lady who traps them."

In British Sound Films: The Studio Years 1928–1959 David Quinlan rated the film as "mediocre", writing: "Most unconvincing minor thriller; Olive Sloane's ripe performance at least punctuates the groans."
