= Gift (1966 film) =

1966 film

- A poster bearing the film's alternative U.S. title, Venom
- Directed by: Knud Leif Thomsen
- Written by: Knud Leif Thomsen
- Produced by: Bo Christensen; Knud Leif Thomsen
- Starring: Søren Strømberg
- Cinematography: Arne Abrahamsen; Claus Loof
- Edited by: Birger Lind
- Distributed by: ASA Film
- Release date: 24 March 1966
- Running time: 96 minutes
- Country: Denmark
- Language: Danish

Gift (Danish: poison) is a 1966 Danish drama film directed by Knud Leif Thomsen and starring Søren Strømberg. In the United States this film is also known as Venom.

== Plot ==
The story is about a hedonistic young man Per, confident and cheeky, always with radical answers on how the world can change for the better. From his boat, he sees a blonde teenage girl Susanne, who is studying on her parents' private beach. In more ways than one, he demonstrates his superior rejection of anything "private," and begins his courtship.

Susanne becomes diffusely interested, and introduces him to the family, a conservative couple, who are going through a middle-age crisis. The generation gap is clearly demonstrated, when Per later uninvited shows up at their daughter's graduation party, and gives her a book of erotic literature as a gift, to her father's annoyance. In the quarrel that follows, it is hinted that pornography is the new ("religion").

Soon a couple, and when they hang out in his apartment, Per shows her 16mm pornographic films, showing various animal species' mating rituals, and a man copulating a woman from the rear. The message, that man is an animal, does not bother Susanne, hardly anything does, not even when he is challenging their relation, filming himself and her girl friends up close.

Hoping the daughter will get tired of her boyfriend, the parents invite him to stay with the family in their villa. The strategy fails and Per increasingly feels "at home" with his film camera, filming "his life".

Alone with Susanne's mother Hjørdis, she, like her daughter a little curious at first, is shown pornographic films, even those that show private intimate moments of her daughter Susanne. Shocked, she escapes the film screening, calls her husband and asks him to come home and throw Per out, and lock their daughter in her room.

== Cast ==
- Søren Strømberg - Per
- Sisse Reingaard - Susanne
- Poul Reichhardt - Henrik Steen
- Astrid Villaume - Hjørdis Steen
- Judy Gringer - Sonja, the Maid
- Grethe Mogensen - Frau Jacobsen, the Secretary
- Karl Stegger - Caretaker
- Per Goldschmidt - Teenager
- Jess Kølpin - Teenager
- Vic Salomonsen - Teenager
- Tine Schmedes - Teenager

== Censorship controversy ==
The intense debate for or against censorship that preceded the premiere, many believe undermined the last arguments for maintaining censorship in Denmark (which was abolished altogether a few years later in 1969).

The film’s paradoxical anti-consumption and anti-porn message was mixed up with explicit pornographic sequences, never seen before in a commercial feature film, in any country. The fact these scenes were primary, and that the film had received an official Film Fund grant, contributed to the dilemma of the censorship committee.

Thomsen uncompromising, fought loudly and publicly for his artistic freedom, and arranged uncensored (more than well attended) previews with an alternative jury and students at Copenhagen University.

The state censorship board already inclined to release written works (1967), feeling compelled to find a compromise, consisting of cutting a haze filter "X" over the "censored" sections. And in doing so, it was argued, transforming an anti-pornographic film into pornography, all unintentionally helpful in marketing.

== Critics reception ==
Exported to USA as the latest daring Scandinavian film, the US Customs had simply removed the "X" rated material, before the New York premiere in January 1968. Unexpectedly it received some positive reviews, which noted that Denmark was now a leader in film development into the unknown.

The critics in Denmark, however, did not like the image of the nation the film gave, and rejected it as tone deaf as for characters depicted. Nevertheless, it contained such “current” topics as book censorship, pornography and the protagonist's work with a handheld camera à la mode "New Wave".
