= Lady with the Light Gloves =

1942 film

- Directed by: Benjamin Christensen
- Written by: Benjamin Christensen
- Starring: Lily Weiding
- Cinematography: Valdemar Christensen
- Release date: 3 August 1942
- Running time: 81 minutes
- Country: Denmark
- Language: Danish

Lady with the Light Gloves (Danish: Damen med de lyse handsker) is a 1942 Danish drama film written and directed by Benjamin Christensen. It was the final film that Christensen directed.

== Cast ==
- Lily Weiding
- Hans-Henrik Krause as Torben
- Tavs Neiiendam
- Paul Rohde
- Karl Jørgensen
- Grete Gravesen
- Jessie Rindom
- Hans Otto Nielsen
- Vagn Kramer
- Holger Strøm
- Olaf Ussing
- Bjarne Henning-Jensen
