= Komtessen =

1961 film

- Directed by: Erik Overbye; Anker Sørensen
- Written by: Erling Poulsen; Erik Pouplier; Anker Sørensen
- Produced by: Preben Philipsen
- Starring: Malene Schwartz
- Cinematography: Henning Bendtsen
- Edited by: Lars Brydesen
- Release date: 27 February 1961
- Running time: 100 minutes
- Country: Denmark
- Language: Danish

Komtessen is a 1961 Danish family film directed by Erik Overbye and starring Malene Schwartz.

== Cast ==
- Malene Schwartz - Betina Mortensen
- Mimi Heinrich - Komtesse Maria Hardenborg
- Birgitte Federspiel - Gevinde Sonja Hardenborg
- Ebbe Langberg - Greve Flemming Hardenborg
- Emil Hass Christensen - Greve Otto Hardenborg
- Poul Reichhardt - Skovfoged Frank Jensen
- Henning Palner - Baron Torben
- Knud Hallest - Adolph Rytting
- Kjeld Jacobsen - Gartner Kresten Kyle
- Maria Garland - Forstanderinde Frk. Joransen
- Else-Marie - Jordemoder Willumsen
- Lily Broberg - Tjenestepigen Ragnhild
- Anne Werner Thomsen - Harriet
- Signi Grenness - Agnes Rytting
- Inge Ketti - Oda
- Else Hvidhøj - Frk. Iversen
- Bendt Rothe - Højesteretssagfører Skotterup
- Henry Nielsen - Landbetjent Henrik
- Hugo Herrestrup - Kadet'en
- Michael Flach - Harry Kyle
- Lili Heglund - Frk. Ravn
- Bent Bentzen - Ritmesteren
- Henry Lohmann - Chauffør Møller
- Ego Brønnum-Jacobsen - Monoklen
- Børge Møller Grimstrup - Hansen
