= Knud Hallest =

Danish actor (1909–1991)

- Born: 12 May 1909; Copenhagen, Denmark
- Died: 4 September 1991 (aged 82); Denmark
- Occupation: Actor
- Years active: 1935-1974

Knud Hallest (12 May 1909 – 4 September 1991) was a Danish film actor. He appeared in 38 films between 1935 and 1974. He was born in Copenhagen, Denmark and died in Denmark.

== Filmography ==
- Pigen og drømmeslottet (1974)
- Skygger (1972)
- Solens børn (1972)
- Mindesmærket (1972)
- Sangen om den røde rubin (1970)
- Ta' lidt solskin (1969)
- Champagne galoppen (1969)
- Min søsters børn vælter byen (1968)
- Lille mand, pas på (1968)
- Min søsters børn på bryllupsrejse (1967)
- Hold da helt ferie (1965)
- I brændingen (1965)
- En ven i bolignøden (1965)
- Slottet (1964)
- The Keeler Affair (1963)
- Frøken April (1963)
- Der brænder en ild (1962)
- Drømmen om det hvide slot (1962)
- Landsbylægen (1961)
- Eventyr på Mallorca (1961)
- Komtessen (1961)
- Reptilicus (1961)
- Eventyrrejsen (1960)
- Det skete på Møllegården (1960)
- Pigen i søgelyset (1959)
- Helle for Helene (1959)
- Styrmand Karlsen (1958)
- Laan mig din kone (1957)
- Natlogi betalt (1957)
- Hidden Fear (1957)
- Ild og jord (1955)
- Arvingen (1954)
- Himlen er blaa (1954)
- Fløjtespilleren (1953)
- Bag de røde porte (1951)
- De røde heste (1950)
- Sommerglæder (1940)
- Min kone er husar (1935)
