= Once There Was a War (film) =

1966 film

- Film poster
- Directed by: Palle Kjærulff-Schmidt
- Written by: Klaus Rifbjerg
- Produced by: Bo Christensen
- Starring: Ole Busck
- Release date: 1966
- Running time: 95 minutes
- Country: Denmark
- Language: Danish

Once There Was a War (Danish: Der var engang en krig) is a 1966 Danish drama film directed by Palle Kjærulff-Schmidt. The film was selected as the Danish entry for the Best Foreign Language Film at the 40th Academy Awards, but was not accepted as a nominee.

== Cast ==
- Ole Busck as Tim
- Kjeld Jacobsen as The Father
- Astrid Villaume as The Mother
- Katja Miehe-Renard as Kate
- Birgit Bendix Madsen as Jane
- Christian Gottschalch as Bedstefaderen
- Yvonne Ingdal as Lis
- Karen Marie Løwert as Lis' mor
- Gregers Ussing as Frank
- Jan Heinig Hansen as Markus
- Birgit Brüel as Markus' mor
- Jørgen Beck as Vennen
- Elsa Kourani as Vennens kone
- Henry Skjær as Rektor
- Holger Perfort as Gymnastiklærer

== See also ==
- List of submissions to the 40th Academy Awards for Best Foreign Language Film
- List of Danish submissions for the Academy Award for Best Foreign Language Film
