= Suddenly, a Woman! =

1963 film

- Directed by: Anker Sørensen
- Written by: Mette Budtz-Jorgensen; Johannes V. Jensen; Anker Sørensen
- Produced by: Morten Schyberg
- Starring: Laila Andersson
- Cinematography: Henning Bendtsen
- Release date: 20 November 1963
- Running time: 100 minutes
- Country: Denmark
- Language: Danish

Suddenly, a Woman! (Danish: Gudrun) is a 1963 Danish drama film directed by Anker Sørensen and starring Laila Andersson.

== Plot ==
In this drama, a young woman is pretty enough to draw lovers to her like flies to honey. Among her suitors are her wealthy business-magnate employer and her lesbian landlady. Unfortunately for all of them, the young woman only has eyes for her childhood sweetheart. The would-be lovers prove themselves to be poor sports and mayhem ensues.

== Cast ==
- Laila Andersson - Gudrun
- Jørgen Buckhøj - Manne
- Poul Reichhardt - Chefen
- Nils Asther - Londonchefen
- Birgitte Federspiel - Husværtinden
- Elsa Kourani - Mrs. Hollund
- Yvonne Ingdal - Office Girl
- Albert Watson
