= The Egborg Girl =

1969 film

- Directed by: Carl Ottosen
- Written by: Carl Ottosen
- Produced by: Henrik Sandberg; Palle Schnedler-Sørensen
- Starring: Dirch Passer
- Cinematography: Jan Lindeström
- Edited by: Edith Nisted Nielsen
- Music by: Sven Gyldmark
- Release date: 12 September 1969
- Running time: 101 minutes
- Country: Denmark
- Language: Danish

The Egborg Girl (Danish: Pigen fra Egborg) is a 1969 Danish comedy film directed by Carl Ottosen and starring Dirch Passer and Sisse Reingaard.

== Cast ==
- Dirch Passer - Skibskok John Søgaard
- Willy Rathnov - Student John Søgaard
- Karl Stegger - Godsbestyrer Koch
- Sisse Reingaard - Marianne Koch
- Birgit Sadolin - Kokkepigen Rikke
- Ove Sprogøe - Advokat Kurt Mikkelsen
- Morten Grunwald - Fuldmægtig hos Mikkelsen
- Tine Blichmann - Stuepigen Tine
- Arne Møller - Arne
- Bent Vejlby - Bjarne
- Hans-Henrik Krause - Professoren
- Inger Gleerup - Servitrice
- William Kisum - Telegrafbudet
- Gertie Jung - Pigen fra ismejeriet
- Claus Ryskjær - Cylkelbudet Kaj
- Frederik Frederiksen - Entertainer
- Svend Asmussen - Entertainer
