= Tavs Neiiendam =

Danish actor, writer, and director (1898–1968)

Coordinates: 55°40′25.1″N 12°32′3.2″E

Tavs Harmens Neiiendam (12 December 1898 in Copenhagen – 3 May 1968) was a Danish actor, writer and director. He was the son of actors Nicolai and Jonna Neiiendam.

Neiiendam studied at the Royal Danish Theatre's Student School from 1918 to 1920 and was associated with this theatre for a number of years. He wrote several radio plays for the Danish national broadcasting service including "Melody of Murder" which was later filmed. He himself acted in relatively few films but covered more than 600 roles on radio.

His play "Inspiration to a Poet" was translated into English by Marianne Helwig. It was broadcast in 1937 on the BBC Home Service with a cast including Gerald Campion.

Tavs Neiiendam is buried at Frederiksberg old cemetery.

== Filmography ==
- Balletten danser (Ballet dancer) - 1938
- Damen med de lyse handsker (The lady with the bright gloves) - 1942
- De tre skolekammerater (The three schoolmates) - 1944
- Hatten er sat - 1947
- Mr. Petit - 1948
- Kampen mod uretten (The struggle against injustice) - 1949
- Nålen (Needle) - 1951
- Alt dette og Island med - 1951
- This Is Life (1953)
- Tre piger fra Jylland (Three girls from Jutland) - 1957
