= The Golden Smile =

1935 film

- Directed by: Pál Fejös
- Written by: Kaj Munk (novel); Pál Fejös
- Starring: Bodil Ipsen; Helen von Münchofen; John Price
- Cinematography: Louis Larsen
- Edited by: Lothar Wolff
- Music by: Ferenc Farkas
- Production company: Nordisk Film
- Release date: 29 August 1935
- Running time: 82 minutes
- Country: Denmark
- Language: Danish

The Golden Smile (Danish: Det gyldne smil) is a 1935 Danish drama film directed by Pál Fejös and starring Bodil Ipsen, Helen von Münchofen and John Price. The film's sets were designed by the art director Heinz Fenchel.

== Cast ==
- Bodil Ipsen as Elsa Bruun
- Helen von Münchofen as Frk. Herjean
- John Price as Forfatter
- Victor Montell as Instruktør
- Petrine Sonne as Fru Sander
- Carl Alstrup as Brandmesteren
- Aage Foss as Portner
- Sam Besekow as Forfatter
- Aage Schmidt as Teaterdirektør
- Carlo Wieth as Peter Clark
- Peter S. Andersen
- Aage Winther-Jørgensen
- Ellen Carstensen Reenberg
- Aage Garde
- Bell Poulsen
- Ruth Berlau as Marie, the housemaid

== Bibliography ==
- Georges Sadoul & Peter Morris. Dictionary of Film Makers. University of California Press, 1972.
