= 4x4 (1965 film) =

1965 film

- Directed by: Palle Kjærulff-Schmidt; Klaus Rifbjerg; Rolf Clemens; Maunu Kurkvaara; Jan Troell
- Written by: Bengt Forslund; Eyvind Johnson; Klaus Rifbjerg; Jan Troell
- Produced by: Peter Refn
- Starring: Niels Barfoed
- Cinematography: Jan Troell
- Release dates: 22 February 1965 (Sweden); 25 February 1965 (Norway); 1 March 1965 (Denmark); 5 March 1965 (Finland)
- Running time: 105 minutes
- Countries: Finland; Norway; Sweden; Denmark
- Languages: Finnish; Norwegian; Swedish; Danish

4x4 (Danish: Nordisk kvadrille; literally, "Nordic quadrille") is a 1965 Nordic co-production drama film directed by Palle Kjærulff-Schmidt, Klaus Rifbjerg, Rolf Clemens, Maunu Kurkvaara and Jan Troell. It was entered into the 4th Moscow International Film Festival, winning a Special Diploma.

== Cast ==
- Niels Barfoed (segment "Sommerkrig")
- Christoffer Bro (segment "Sommerkrig")
- Robert Broberg as Frank Citter (Pike med hvit ball)
- Allan Edwall as Banvakten (segment "Uppehåll i myrlandet")
- Karl Erik Flens as Station master (segment "Uppehåll i myrlandet")
- Vegard Hall as an old musician (Pike med hvit ball)
- Yvonne Ingdal
- Anne Marit Jacobsen as Jenta (Pike med hvit ball)
- Ole Sørlie as Gutten (Pike med hvit ball)
- Max von Sydow as Kvist (segment "Uppehåll i myrlandet")
- Kari Øhrn Geelmuyden as Vibeke (Pike med hvit ball)
- May-Britt Stierncreutz (segment "Pourquoi?")
- Jaakko Ahvonen (segment "Pourquoi?")
- Sinikka Hannula (segment "Pourquoi?")
