= Henning Palner =

Danish actor (1932–2018)

- Born: 18 July 1932; Helsingør, Denmark
- Died: 20 December 2018 (aged 86)
- Occupation: Actor
- Years active: 1961–2012

Henning Palner (18 July 1932 – 20 December 2018) was a Danish actor.

== Filmography ==
| Year | Title | Role | Notes |
|---|---|---|---|
| 1961 | Komtessen | Baron Torben | |
| 1961 | Jetpiloter | Flyverløjtnant Jan | |
| 1961 | Sorte Shara | Skæg | |
| 1961 | Støv på hjernen | Viggo Svendsen | |
| 1962 | Det støver stadig | Viggo Svendsen | |
| 1962 | Drømmen om det hvide slot | Greve Albert Wennerfeldt | |
| 1963 | Vi voksne | Johan | |
| 1963 | Støv for alle pengene | Viggo Svendsen | |
| 1964 | Slottet | Bill | |
| 1965 | Passer passer piger | Viggo Svendsen | |
| 1967 | Den røde kappe | Hake | |
| 1975 | Bejleren – en jysk røverhistorie | Røver Ole | |
| 1976 | Strømer | Palle Møller | |
| 1976 | Affæren i Mølleby | Ditlefsen | |
| 1977 | Terror | Direktør Ejlersen | |
| 1977 | Pas på ryggen, professor | Kriminalbetjent | |
| 1977 | Skytten | | |
| 1978 | Vinterbørn | Overlægen | |
| 1978 | Olsen-banden går i krig | Pilot | Uncredited |
| 1978 | Vil du se min smukke navle? | Svendsen | |
| 1979 | Krigernes børn | Borgmesteren | |
| 2001 | Et rigtigt menneske | Forsberg | |
| 2005 | Solkongen | Solkongen | (final film role) |
