= Kisses Right and Left =

1969 film

- Directed by: Ole Roos
- Written by: Jens Gielstrup; Leif Panduro; Ole Roos
- Produced by: Mogens Skot-Hansen
- Starring: Peter Bonke
- Cinematography: Peter Roos
- Edited by: Knud Hauge; Ole Roos
- Release date: 13 March 1969
- Running time: 85 minutes
- Country: Denmark
- Language: Danish

Kisses Right and Left (Danish: Kys til højre og venstre) is a 1969 Danish film directed by Ole Roos and starring Peter Bonke.

The plot follows two young men, Jack and Hugo, navigating their relationships when both independently find love in two different affairs. One man falls for a married women 10 years older than him, Betty, while the other falls for a married actress that is much younger, Ruth. Both women are technically unavailable, but the men have a bet. The film follows how these two relationships end differently

== Cast ==
- Peter Bonke - Jack
- Jens Østerholm - Hugo
- Birgitte Bruun - Betty
- Poul Reichhardt - Edmund
- Vigga Bro - Lizzie
- Helle Hertz
- Yvonne Ingdal - Skuespillerinden
- Ove Sprogøe - Ruths Husband
- Karl Stegger - Togpassager
