= Lily Broberg =

Danish actress (1923–1989)

- Born: 19 September 1923; Skørring, Denmark
- Died: 30 July 1989 (aged 65); Frederiksberg, Denmark

Lily Broberg (19 September 1923 – 30 July 1989) was a Danish stage and film actress.

Born in Skørring, Jutland, Denmark, she died in Frederiksberg and was buried at the Frederiksberg Ældre Kirkegård.

== Filmography ==
- Lev livet let − 1944
- Bedstemor går amok − 1945
- En ny dag gryer − 1945
- Panik i familien − 1945
- Diskret ophold − 1946
- Op med lille Martha − 1946
- Hans store aften − 1946
- Hr. Petit − 1948
- Det gælder os alle − 1949
- Kampen mod uretten − 1949
- The Red Horses − 1950
- Op og ned langs kysten − 1950
- I gabestokken − 1950
- Bag de røde porte − 1951
- Fireogtyve timer − 1951
- Meet Me on Cassiopeia − 1951
- Frihed forpligter − 1951
- Husmandstøsen − 1952
- Rekrut 67, Petersen − 1952
- Min søn Peter − 1953
- Himlen er blå − 1954
- Karen, Maren og Mette − 1954
- Kispus − 1956
- Færgekroen − 1956
- Laan mig din kone − 1957
- Der var engang en gade − 1957
- Tag til marked i Fjordby − 1957
- Pigen og vandpytten − 1958
- Seksdagesløbet − 1958
- Pigen i søgelyset − 1959
- Kvindelist og kærlighed − 1960
- Komtessen − 1961
- Løgn og løvebrøl − 1961
- Harry and the Butler − 1961
- Den kære familie − 1962
- Det stod i avisen − 1962
- Sømænd og svigermødre − 1962
- Crazy Paradise − 1962
- Frøken April − 1963
- Bussen − 1963
- Hold da helt ferie − 1965
- Sytten − 1965
- Dyden går amok − 1966
- Flagermusen − 1966
- Soyas tagsten − 1966
- Cirkusrevyen (1967) − 1967
- Me and My Kid Brother − 1967
- Stormvarsel − 1968
- Helle for Lykke − 1969
- Damernes ven − 1969
- De fem og spionerne − 1969
- De fem i fedtefadet − 1970
- Hosekræmmeren − 1971
- Med kærlig hilsen − 1971
- Nu går den på Dagmar − 1972
- Fætrene på Torndal − 1973
- Pigen og drømmeslottet − 1974
- Familien Gyldenkål − 1975
- Sønnen fra Vingården − 1975
- The Moelleby Affair − 1976
- Mind Your Back, Professor − 1977
- Going for Broke − 1977
- Danmark er lukket − 1980
- Det parallelle lig − 1982
- Sidste akt − 1987
