= Laan mig din kone =

1957 film

- Directed by: Preben Neergaard; Anker Sørensen
- Written by: Fleming Lynge; Preben Neergaard; Erik Pouplier
- Produced by: Werner Hedman; Aage Stentoft
- Starring: Gunnar Lauring
- Cinematography: Karl Andersson
- Release date: 28 October 1957
- Running time: 94 minutes
- Country: Denmark
- Language: Danish

Laan mig din kone is a 1957 Danish comedy film directed by Preben Neergaard and Anker Sørensen and starring Gunnar Lauring.

== Cast ==
- Gunnar Lauring - Direktør Henrik Rudholm
- Anne Werner Thomsen - Susanne Rudholm
- Preben Mahrt - Salgschef Børge Lund
- Buster Larsen - Arkitekt Torben Einerts
- Lily Broberg - Ulla Einerts
- Christian Arhoff - Repræsentant Halfdan Knudsen
- Bodil Steen - Henriette Flint
- Ole Monty - Afdelingschef Thomsen
- Inga Løfgren - Fru Thomsen
- Knud Hallest - Afdelingschef Kjær
- Ellen Friis - Fru Kjær
- Bjørn Spiro - Politibetjenten
- Poul Reichhardt - Portieren
- Ego Brønnum-Jacobsen - Nielsen
- Ejnar Larsen - Hotelkarlen
- Jens Kjeldby - Kasserer Jørgensen
- Poul Bundgaard - Portieren
- Preben Uglebjerg - Fortælleren
