= William Rosenberg (actor) =

Danish actor (1920–2014)

- Born: 12 February 1920; Copenhagen, Denmark
- Died: 6 November 2014 (aged 94); Odense, Denmark
- Occupation: Actor
- Years active: 1948–2008

William Rosenberg (12 February 1920 – 6 November 2014) was a Danish actor. He appeared in more than 35 films and television shows between 1948 and 2008.

== Selected filmography ==
- Mosekongen (1950)
- Fodboldpræsten (1951)
- Det store løb (1952)
- Arvingen (1954)
- Der brænder en ild (1962)
- Dronningens vagtmester (1963)
- South of Tana River (1963)
- Magic in Town (1968)
- Kid Gang on the Go (1971)
- Skytten (1977)
- Run for Your Life (1997)
