= The Last Winter (1960 film) =

1960 film

- Directed by: Frank Dunlop; Anker Sørensen; Edvin Tiemroth
- Written by: Karl Bjarnhof; Basil Dawson; Jørgen Roos
- Produced by: Bent Christensen
- Starring: Tony Britton
- Release date: 30 September 1960
- Running time: 91 minutes
- Country: Denmark
- Language: Danish

The Last Winter (Danish: Den sidste vinter) is a 1960 Danish war film directed by Frank Dunlop, Anker Sørensen and Edvin Tiemroth. It was entered into the 2nd Moscow International Film Festival.

== Cast ==
- Tony Britton as Stephen Burton
- Dieter Eppler as Oberleutnant Ahlbach
- John Wittig as Læge John Sørensen
- Birgitte Federspiel as Anne Sørensen
- Axel Strøbye as Erik Sørensen
- Lise Ringheim as Eva Sørensen
- Preben Kaas as Gustav
- Hanne Winther-Jørgensen as Nina
- Hugo Herrestrup as Klaus
- Anker Taasti as Poul
- Preben Neergaard as Peter
- Ernst Bruun Olsen as Den fremmede modstandsmand
- Jørgen Weel as Niels Jacobsen
