= Tine (film) =

1964 film

- Directed by: Knud Leif Thomsen
- Written by: Herman Bang; Knud Leif Thomsen
- Starring: Lone Hertz
- Cinematography: Henning Kristiansen
- Release date: 4 September 1964
- Running time: 137 minutes
- Country: Denmark
- Language: Danish

Tine is a 1964 Danish drama film directed by Knud Leif Thomsen. It was entered into the 4th Moscow International Film Festival.

== Cast ==
- Lone Hertz as Tine Bølling
- Jørgen Reenberg as Skovrider Berg
- Birgitte Federspiel as Fru Berg
- Ellen Gottschalch as Madam Bølling
- Johannes Meyer as Hr. Bølling
- Grethe Thordahl as Sofie
- Marie-Louise Coninck as Maren
- Tove Wisborg as Tinka
- Palle Huld as Baron Staub
- Einar Juhl as Provsten
- John Price as Krigskorrespondenten
- Holger Juul Hansen as Løvenhjelm
