= Palle Kjærulff-Schmidt =

Danish film director (1931–2018)

- Born: 7 July 1931; Esbjerg, Denmark
- Died: 14 March 2018 (aged 86)
- Occupations: Film director Screenwriter
- Years active: 1957-1995

Palle Kjærulff-Schmidt (7 July 1931 – 14 March 2018) was a Danish film director and screenwriter. He has directed 32 films between 1957 and 1995. His 1964 film To was entered into the 15th Berlin International Film Festival. Two years later, his 1967 film Story of Barbara was entered into the 17th Berlin International Film Festival.

In 1965 he co-produced the film 4x4 and it was entered into the 4th Moscow International Film Festival.

Kjærulff-Schmidt died on 14 March 2018 after a short illness at the age of 86.

== Selected filmography ==
- Bundfald (1957)
- To (1964)
- 4x4 (1965)
- Once There Was a War (1966)
- Story of Barbara (1967)
- Tukuma (1984)
