= Harry and the Butler =

1961 film

Harry og kammertjeneren
- Directed by: Bent Christensen
- Written by: Bent Christensen; Leif Panduro
- Produced by: Bent Christensen; Preben Philipsen
- Starring: Osvald Helmuth; Ebbe Rode; Gunnar Lauring
- Cinematography: Kjeld Arnholtz
- Edited by: Kirsten Christensen; Lene Møller
- Music by: Niels Rothenborg
- Release date: 8 September 1961
- Running time: 105 minutes
- Country: Denmark
- Language: Danish

Harry and the Butler (Danish: Harry og kammertjeneren) is a 1961 Danish film directed by Bent Christensen. It was nominated for the Academy Award for Best Foreign Language Film. It was also entered into the 1962 Cannes Film Festival.

== Plot ==
The film tells the story of an elderly, impoverished man named Harry who inherits some money and uses it to hire a valet. Initially unfamiliar with Harry's world, the valet grows to sympathize with it and decides to stay.

== Cast ==
- Osvald Helmuth as Gamle Harry
- Ebbe Rode as Fabricius
- Gunnar Lauring as Biskoppen
- Henning Moritzen as Fyrst Igor
- Lise Ringheim as Magdalene
- Lily Broberg as Trine, Café Dråbens værtinde
- Olaf Ussing as Krause, bilforhandler
- Palle Kirk as Heisenberg, 8 år
- Aage Fønss as Herskabstjener I
- Ejner Federspiel as Herskabstjener II
- Einar Reim (as Einer Reim) as Mink, overbetjent
- Ernst Schou as Advokat Lund
- Emil Halberg as Viggo, udsmider
- Johannes Krogsgaard as Teaterdirektøren
- Valsø Holm as Meyer, grønthandler

== See also ==
- List of submissions to the 34th Academy Awards for Best Foreign Language Film
- List of Danish submissions for the Academy Award for Best Foreign Language Film
