= Kong Hans Kælder =

Restaurant in Copenhagen, Denmark

Coordinates: 55.6788°N 12.5841°E

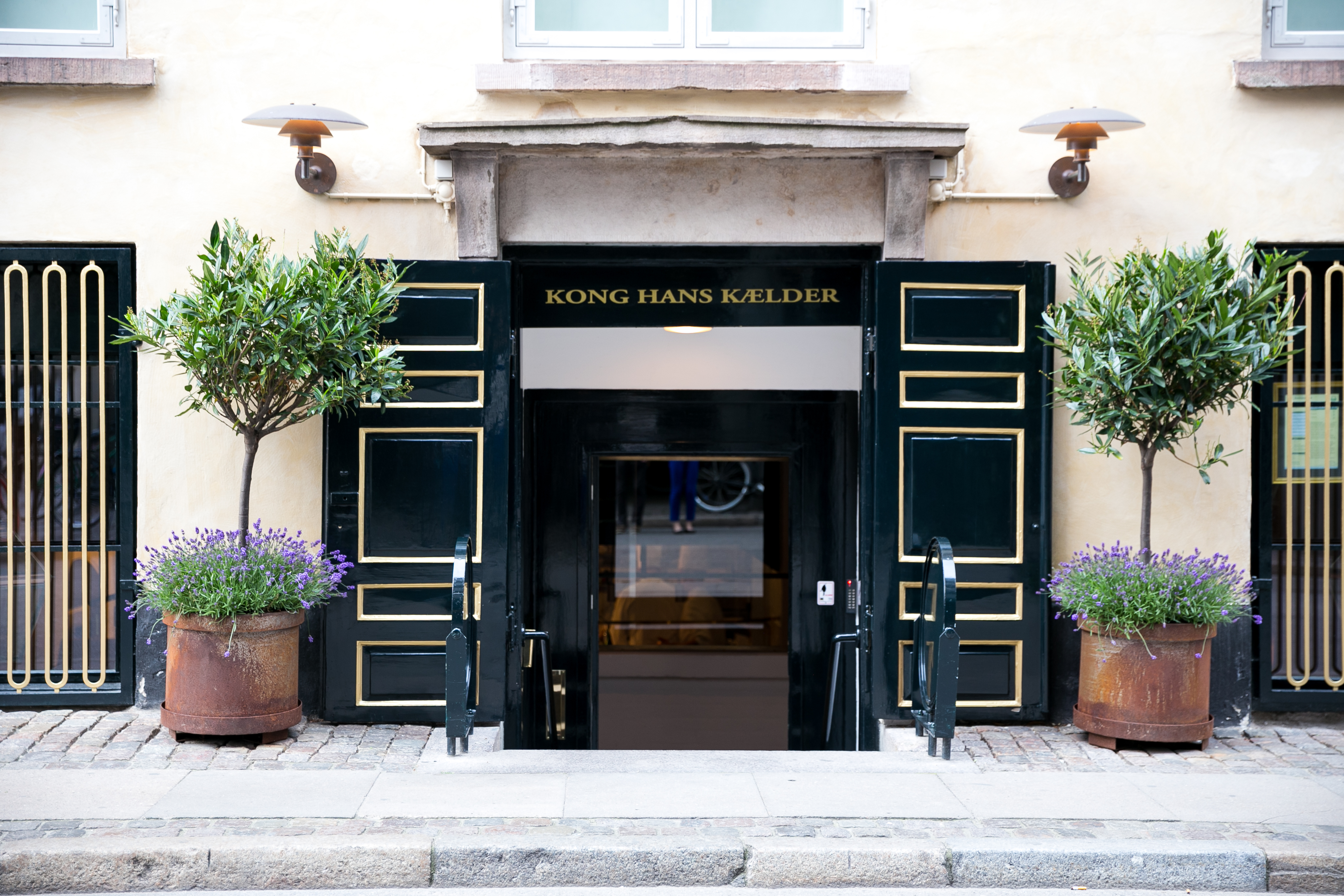
Kong Hans Kælder

Kong Hans Kælder is a two Michelin star restaurant in Copenhagen, Denmark. It received the first Michelin star awarded to a Copenhagen restaurant, but lost its star in March 2014 . It since regained a Michelin star in 2015. On 13 September 2021, Kong Hans Kælder received a second Michelin star. The cuisine is mainly classical French with contemporary Nordic influences. The head chef is Mark Lundgaard.

The restaurant is located in a white-washed, groin vaulted basement under one of the oldest houses in Copenhagen, a former merchant's residence from the Middle Ages, in a small street just off Kongens Nytorv. Kong Hans Kælder translates into King John's cellar.

== History ==
Kong Hans Kælder was established in Copenhagen in 1976 by filmmakers and culinary entrepreneurs Sven and Lene Grønlykke, with Danish author Klaus Rifbjerg as an investor. It was the first French-style gourmet restaurant in Copenhagen and drew considerable media attention at its opening. The first head chef was French Michel Michaud, until then head chef of one of the Grønlycke family's other establishments, Falsled Kro in the southern part of the island of Funen. In 1980, the kitchen was taken over by another Frenchman, Daniel Letz, under whom the restaurant received its first Michelin star in 1983. In 1998, Thomas Rode Andersen replaced Letz as head chef of Kong Hans Kælder.
