= To (film) =

- Directed by: Palle Kjærulff-Schmidt
- Written by: Klaus Rifbjerg
- Produced by: Finn Aabye; Helge Robbert; Uffe Stormgaard
- Starring: Yvonne Ingdal
- Cinematography: Georg Oddner
- Edited by: Edith Nisted Nielsen
- Release date: 26 August 1964
- Running time: 85 minutes
- Country: Denmark
- Language: Danish

To is a 1964 Danish film directed by Palle Kjærulff-Schmidt and entered into the 15th Berlin International Film Festival.

== Cast ==
- Yvonne Ingdal as Lone
- Jens Østerholm as Niels
- Jørgen Bidstrup
- Birgit Brüel
- Christian Glatved
- Kjeld Jacobsen
- Peter Steen
- Lis Adelvard
