= Sven and Lene Grønlykke =

Danish married couple

Sven Grønlykke (1927–1998) and Lene Grønlykke (18 October 1933 – 28 November 1990) was a Danish husband-and-wife partnership who started out in film-making but are today most known for their achievements as culinary entrepreneurs. They founded the food company Løgismose, named after the family estate Løgismose Castle, as well as the gourmet restaurants Falsled Kro and Kong Hans Kælder.

== Biography ==
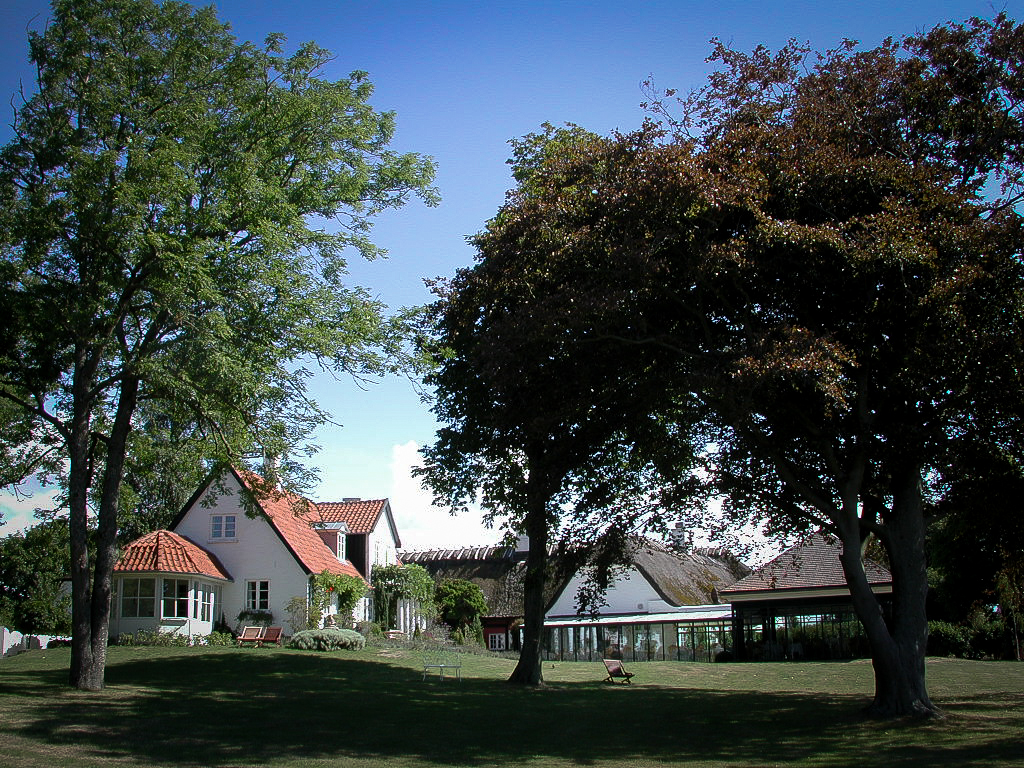
Falsled Kro

Sven Grønlykke began his career in sales of farming machines and later made a move into production of foam rubber for the furniture industry with factories in Germany, Sweden, Norway and Spain.

In 1953 he married Lene (born Meyer Petersen), who was a journalist, and after making a fortune from the sale of their business empire the couple acquired the ASA Filmudlejning in Copenhagen in 1964 to pursue a career in film-making as well as Løgismose Castle on the island of Funen in 1965. Writing and directing the films in collaboration, they first made the children's film Thomas er fredløs from 1967 and then experienced a breakthrough with The Ballad of Carl-Henning, inspired by the French New Wave and won the Danish Film Critics Award for Best Danish Film on 1969. Over the next few years Sven Grønlykke produced a number of films before they sold their film studio to the Danish state in 1972.

The couple had plans to open a restaurant in the Basque Country but instead ended up buying the run down Falsled Kro, located not far from their Funen estate, turning it into a boutique hotel and French-style gourmet restaurant. They also began to produce cheese and chocolate on their Løgismose estate and to import French wines, naming their company Løgismose after the estate. In 1976 they opened the restaurant Kong Hans Kælder in Copenhagen together with the writer Klaus Rifbjerg and his wife Inge.

In 1981 they released their third and last film, Thorvald og Linda, a drama set among railway workers in Jutland in 1912.

== Filmography ==
=== Producer ===
- Naboerne (1966)
- Thomas er fredløs (1967 )
- The Ballad of Carl-Henning (1969)
- Farlige kys (1972)

=== Director ===
- Thomas er fredløs ( 1967)
- The Ballad of Carl-Henning ( 1969)
- Thorvald og Linda (1982)

=== Writer ===
- Thomas er fredløs (1967)
- The Ballad of Carl-Henning (1969)
- Thorvald og Linda (1982)
