= Mind Your Back, Professor =

1977 Danish comedy film

- Directed by: Jens Okking
- Written by: Orla Johansen; Jens Okking
- Produced by: Just Betzer; Gorm Lindbjerg
- Starring: Ulf Pilgaard
- Cinematography: Mikael Salomon
- Release date: 19 August 1977
- Running time: 87 minutes
- Country: Denmark
- Language: Danish

Mind Your Back, Professor (Danish: Pas på ryggen, professor) is a 1977 Danish comedy film directed by Jens Okking and starring Ulf Pilgaard. The film is actor Jens Okking's debut as a director and screenwriter and is loosely based on Orla Johansen's novel Ryggen, professor!

== Cast ==
- Ulf Pilgaard as Professor Oscar Latour / Gert Latour
- Lisbet Lundquist as Kerstin
- Brigitte Kolerus as Cecilie Fabel
- Bjørn Puggaard-Müller as Cecilies Far
- Lily Broberg as Cecilies Mor
- Jørgen Buckhøj as Anders Gløk-Jensen
- Helle Virkner as Fru Andersen
- Ove Verner Hansen as Hr. Andersen
- Karl Stegger as Kriminalassistent
- Henning Palner as Kriminalbetjent
- Kirsten Walther as Kerstins Mor
- Poul Reichhardt as O.C., Kerstins Far
- Vera Gebuhr as Husholdersken Trunte
- Ghita Nørby as Madame Natasha
- Karen Lykkehus as Tante Anna
- Sven-Ole Thorsen as Håndlanger

== Reception ==
The Danish Film Institute indicates that "[m]ore emphasis is placed on comedy than on the crime plot" and that the film received poor reviews.
