= Constantin Philipsen =

One of the founders of the Cinema of Denmark

Lauritz Carl Constantin Philipsen (1 December 1859 in Copenhagen; died 23 August 1925 Copenhagen) is credited as one of the founders of the Cinema of Denmark.

== Biography ==
Philipsen, a photographer toured Scandinavian nations from 1898 with his magic lantern He eventually sold his photography business to enter the emerging world of cinema on a full-time basis.

Philipsen opened Denmark's first viable cinema the 158 seat Kosmorama in 1904 in Copenhagen He opened 26 more Kosmorama Cinemas in Denmark between 1905 and 1906. Though the majority of cinemas seated at most 300-400 people, Philipsen opened the large Palace Cinema seating 2500 and using a 30 piece orchestra in to former site of Copenhagen's Grand Central Railway station

In addition to owning cinemas Philipsen began producing his own films from 1909.

== Legacy ==
His son Preben Philipsen (1910–2005) named his Constantin Film company after his father.
