= Knud Leif Thomsen =

Danish film director

- Born: 2 September 1924; Ballerup, Denmark
- Died: 14 October 2003 (aged 79); France
- Occupations: Film director Screenwriter
- Years active: 1957 - 1975

Knud Leif Thomsen (2 September 1924 – 14 October 2003) was a Danish film director and screenwriter. He directed 14 films between 1960 and 1975. His film Duellen was entered into the 12th Berlin International Film Festival. Two years later, his film School for Suicide was entered into the 14th Berlin International Film Festival.

In 1965 his film Tine was entered into the 4th Moscow International Film Festival. His 1969 film Jazz All Around was entered into the 6th Moscow International Film Festival. His 1973 film Lina's Wedding was entered into the 8th Moscow International Film Festival.

In 1967 he was a member of the jury at the 17th Berlin International Film Festival.

== Selected filmography ==
- Duellen (1962)
- School for Suicide (1964)
- Tine (1965)
- Gift (1966)
- Jazz All Around (1969)
- Lina's Wedding (1973)
