= Preben Uglebjerg =

Danish actor (1931–1968)

- Born: 16 January 1931; Glostrup, Denmark
- Died: 31 May 1968 (aged 37); Birkerød, Denmark
- Occupation: Actor
- Years active: 1946-1968

Preben Uglebjerg (16 January 1931 – 31 May 1968) was a Danish film actor and entertainer. He appeared in nine films between 1946 and 1963. He was born in Glostrup, Denmark and was killed in a late night traffic accident of unknown cause.

== Filmography ==
- Støt står den danske sømand (1948)
- This Is Life (1953)
- Vi som går stjernevejen (1956)
- Für zwei Groschen Zärtlichkeit (1957)
- Laan mig din kone (1957)
- Amor i telefonen (1957)
- Det lille hotel (1958)
- Pigen og vandpytten (1958)
- Han, hun og pengene (1963)
