= School for Suicide =

1964 film

- Directed by: Knud Leif Thomsen
- Written by: Knud Leif Thomsen
- Produced by: Erik Overbye
- Starring: Jørgen Ryg
- Cinematography: Henning Kristiansen
- Release date: 30 March 1964
- Running time: 86 minutes
- Country: Denmark
- Language: Danish

School for Suicide (Danish: Selvmordsskolen) is a 1964 Danish drama film directed by Knud Leif Thomsen. It was entered into the 14th Berlin International Film Festival.

== Cast ==
- Jørgen Ryg - Mand der ønsker at begå selvmord
- Axel Strøbye - Professor / Bilsælger
- Hans W. Petersen - Bedemanden S.S. Markussen
- Bodil Udsen - Sundhedsplejerske
- Tina Nørløv - Kvinde der reklamerer i TV
- Judy Gringer - Sekretær for professoren
- Helle Hertz - Frk. Hansen
- Lone Hertz - Kvinde der studerer sex-stillinger
- Harald Isenstein - Kunstner
- Minna Jørgensen - Mor
- Palle Huld - Far
- Kirsten Walther - Datter
- Preben Kaas - Søn
- Morten Grunwald - Søn
- Paul Hagen - Taler foran Folketinget
- Klaus Nielsen - Mand i Nyhavn
