= Panic in Paradise (film) =

1960 film

- Directed by: Hagen Hasselbalch
- Written by: Hagen Hasselbalch; Tørk Haxthausen; Børge Høst
- Produced by: Hagen Hasselbalch
- Starring: Alf Kjellin
- Cinematography: Hagen Hasselbalch; Ole Roos
- Edited by: Mogens Green; Hagen Hasselbalch
- Release date: 18 October 1960
- Running time: 82 minutes
- Country: Denmark
- Language: Danish

Panic in Paradise (Danish: Panik i paradis) is a 1960 Danish comedy film directed by Hagen Hasselbalch and starring Alf Kjellin.

The story of this 82-minute film follows the people who live in the small Danish town of Elleskovsleje.

== Cast ==
- Alf Kjellin - Frederik
- Katarina Hellberg
- Mogens Brandt
- Dirch Passer - Greven
- William Brüel
- Helge Kjærulff-Schmidt - Gas & Vandmesteren
- Kirsten Olsen
- Vivi Ancher
- Olaf Ussing
- Paul Møller
- Ego Brønnum-Jacobsen
