= Jazz All Around =

1969 film

- Directed by: Knud Leif Thomsen
- Written by: Knud Sønderby; Knud Leif Thomsen
- Produced by: Lars Kolvig
- Starring: Finn Storgaard
- Cinematography: Henning Kristiansen
- Production company: Saga Studios
- Release date: 21 April 1969
- Running time: 97 minutes
- Country: Denmark
- Language: Danish

Jazz All Around (Danish: Midt i en jazztid) is a 1969 Danish drama film directed by Knud Leif Thomsen. It was entered into the 6th Moscow International Film Festival.

== Cast ==
- Finn Storgaard as Peter Hasvig
- Lotte Wæver as Ellen
- Anne-Lise Gabold as Vera Bagger
- Torben Jetsmark as Hugo
- Elsebeth Reingaard as Ida Schmidt
- Gitte Reingaard as Esther Schmidt
- Sisse Reingaard as Stuepige
- Susanne Heinrich as Eva Bagger
- Steen Frøhne as Johannes
- Søren Rode as Hjalmer
- Søren Strømberg as Kontorelev
