= Edvin Tiemroth =

Danish actor (1915–1984)

- Born: 18 February 1915; Copenhagen, Denmark
- Died: 16 November 1984 (aged 69); Denmark
- Occupations: Actor, film director
- Years active: 1939–1976

Edvin Tiemroth (18 February 1915 – 16 November 1984) was a Danish actor and film director. He appeared in 15 films between 1939 and 1976. He also directed 13 films between 1954 and 1974. His 1960 co-directed film The Last Winter was entered into the 2nd Moscow International Film Festival.

== Selected filmography ==
- Affæren i Mølleby (1976)
- Kassen stemmer (1976)
- Askepot (1973)
- The Last Winter (1960)
- Ditte menneskebarn (1946)
- Så mødes vi hos Tove (1946)
- Den usynlige hær (1945)
- Biskoppen (1944)
- Naar man kun er ung (1943)
- Mine kære koner (1943)
- Erik Ejegods pilgrimsfærd (1943)
- Ballade i Nyhavn (1942)
- Et skud før midnat (1942)
- Far skal giftes (1941)
- Jeg har elsket og levet (1940)
- En lille tilfældighed (1939)
