= Sisse Reingaard =

Danish actress

- Born: 23 September 1946 (age 79); Denmark
- Died: October 2, 2024; Denmark
- Occupation: Actress
- Years active: 1965-1980

Sisse Reingaard (born Anne-Marie Reingaard; 23 September 1946 - 2 October 2024) was a Danish film actress. She appeared in 28 films between 1965 and 1980.

== Selected filmography ==
- Gift (1966)
- Der var engang (1966)
- The Egborg Girl (1969)
- Jazz All Around (1969)
- The Key to Paradise (1970)
- Tough Guys of the Prairie (1970)
- Where Is the Body, Moeller? (1971)
