= Anker Sørensen =

Danish film editor

- Born: 3 May 1926; Denmark
- Died: 19 August 2010 (aged 84); Copenhagen, Denmark
- Occupations: Film editor and director
- Years active: 1946-1988

Anker Sørensen (3 May 1926 – 19 August 2010) was a Danish film editor and director. He directed 18 films between 1949 and 1973. His 1960 film The Last Winter was entered into the 2nd Moscow International Film Festival.

== Selected filmography ==
- Jenny and the Soldier (1947)
- John og Irene (1949)
- The Crime of Tove Andersen (1953)
- Laan mig din kone (1957)
- Styrmand Karlsen (1958)
- That Won't Keep a Sailor Down (1958)
- The Last Winter (1960)
- Komtessen (1961)
- Jetpiloter (1961)
- Suddenly, a Woman! (1963)
- The Castle (1964)
- Don Olsen kommer til byen (1964)
- Ghost Train International (1976)
