= Ballad of Carl-Henning =

1969 film

- Film poster
- Directed by: Sven and Lene Grønlykke
- Written by: Sven and Lene Grønlykke
- Produced by: Sven Grønlykke
- Starring: Jesper Klein
- Cinematography: Jesper Høm
- Edited by: Lars Brydesen
- Music by: Patrick Gowers
- Distributed by: ASA Film
- Release date: 7 April 1969
- Running time: 85 minutes
- Country: Denmark
- Language: Danish

Ballad of Carl-Henning (Danish: Balladen om Carl-Henning) is a 1969 Danish comedy film written and directed by Sven and Lene Grønlykke. The film won a Bodil Award for Best Danish Film and Jesper Klein won the award for Best Actor in a Leading Role of 1969.

== Cast ==
- Jesper Klein as Carl-Henning
- Paul Hüttel as Poul
- Inge Baaring as Pouls forlovede
- Edith Thrane as Carl-Hennings mor
- Ejnar Larsen as Carl-Hennings far
- Mime Fønss as Pouls mor
- Preben Borggaard as Pouls far
- John Wittig as Mejeribestyreren
- Kai Christoffersen as Fede Kai
- Suzzie Müllertz as Højskolepige
- Birgitte Rasmussen as Nancy
- June Belli as Pige i omrejsende Tivoli
- Olaf Ussing as Instruktør
- Henry Krosøe as Tilskuer ved motorløb
- Ellen Staal as Servitrice
- Maia Årskov as Medvirkende
- Poul Glargaard as Medvirkende
- Medert Ehmsen as Medvirkende

== Awards ==
The film was selected as the Danish entry for the Best Foreign Language Film at the 42nd Academy Awards, but was not accepted as a nominee. The film was entered into the 19th Berlin International Film Festival. It also won the 1969 Bodil Award for Best Danish Film.

== See also ==
- List of submissions to the 42nd Academy Awards for Best Foreign Language Film
- List of Danish submissions for the Academy Award for Best Foreign Language Film
