= Bob Ramsing =

Danish film director

- Born: 17 January 1923; Århus, Denmark
- Died: 16 January 1998 (aged 74)
- Occupations: Screenwriter; Film director
- Years active: 1958 - 1992

Bob Ramsing (17 January 1923 – 16 January 1998) was a Danish screenwriter and film director. He wrote for 24 films between 1958 and 1992. He was born in Århus, Denmark.

== Selected filmography ==
- Soldaterkammerater rykker ud (1959)
- Sømand i knibe (1960)
- Crazy Paradise (1962)
- Oskar (1962)
- Vi har det jo dejligt (1963)
- Bussen (1963)
- Sytten (1965)
