= The Man Who Thought Life =

1969 film

- Directed by: Jens Ravn
- Written by: Valdemar Holst; Jens Ravn; Henrik Stangerup
- Starring: John Price
- Cinematography: Witold Leszczyński
- Edited by: Lars Brydesen
- Music by: Per Nørgård
- Distributed by: ASA films
- Release date: 9 May 1969
- Running time: 93 minutes
- Country: Denmark
- Language: Danish

The Man Who Thought Life (Danish: Manden der tænkte ting) is a 1969 Danish science fiction thriller film directed by Jens Ravn and based upon the 1938 novel by Valdemar Holst. It was entered into the 1969 Cannes Film Festival.

== Cast ==
- John Price as Steinmetz
- Preben Neergaard as Max Holst
- Lotte Tarp as Susanne
- Lars Lunøe as Robert
- Kirsten Rolffes as Værtinden
- Ejner Federspiel as Butleren
- Elith Pio as Overlægen
- Jørgen Beck as Kriminalassistenten
- Tove Maës as Kasserersken
