= Neighbours (1966 film) =

1966 film

- Directed by: Bent Christensen
- Written by: Leif Panduro; Bent Christensen
- Produced by: Sven Grønlykke; Bent Christensen
- Starring: Ebbe Rode
- Cinematography: Henning Bendtsen
- Release date: 7 March 1966
- Running time: 90 minutes
- Country: Denmark
- Language: Danish

Neighbours (Danish: Naboerne) is a 1966 Danish comedy film directed by Bent Christensen. It was entered into the 5th Moscow International Film Festival.

== Cast ==
- Ebbe Rode as Tandlæge Gormsen
- Hanne Borchsenius as Fru Gormsen
- John Price as Fabrikant Sandelund
- Grethe Sønck as Fru Sandelund
- Peter Steen as Ludvig
- Elsebeth Reingaard as Nille
- Jesper Langberg as Freddy
- Tine Schmedes as Rikke
- Pouel Kern as Isenkræmmer Krause
- Henry Lohmann as Gartner Andersen
- Ingrid Langballe as Fru Jensen
- Karl Stegger as Betjent Holm
- Svend Bille as Bankbestyreren
- Stanley Robbson as Englænder
