= Duellen =

1962 film

- Directed by: Knud Leif Thomsen
- Written by: Knud Leif Thomsen
- Starring: Frits Helmuth
- Cinematography: Arne Abrahamsen
- Release date: 9 February 1962
- Running time: 97 minutes
- Country: Denmark
- Language: Danish

Duellen (The Duel) is a 1962 Danish drama film directed by Knud Leif Thomsen. It was entered into the 12th Berlin International Film Festival.

== Cast ==
- Frits Helmuth - Mikael
- Malene Schwartz - Tina
- John Price - Claes
- Axel Strøbye - Basse
- Hans Kurt - Player 1
- Buster Larsen - Player 2
- Vera Gebuhr - Lene
- Albert Watson - Match Referee
- Ulla Darni - Chorus Singer Sussy
- Elith Pio - Tina's grandfather
- Poul Müller - Professor
- Karl Stegger - Overseer
- Aage Winther-Jørgensen - Blood donor
- Minna Jørgensen - Nurse
- Paul Thomsen - Servant
- Knud Rex - Conference attendee

== Setting ==
This film came about whilst in Denmark, there was an intense debate whether censorship should remain and meddle in, what (foreign) classic erotic literature could be translated and published together with similar upcoming domestic works, or which age group could be considered allowed to watch films of interest to youth.

== Synopsis and critics reception ==
The story is a classic triangle drama about Mikael, a medicine student, who the casual liberal man he thinks he is, works extra at a strip club, where he meets and falls in love with Tina. She dreams of a film career, and works extra as an assistant and mistress for an older cynical film director Claes. When Mikael finds out, confused and hurt, he rather surprisingly challenges Claes to a duel.

The film received positive reviews for being the first Danish film in a long time to believe in something and shed light on moral and social issues of the time.
