= Hardy Rafn =

Danish actor (1930–1997)

- Born: 17 September 1930; Slagelse, Denmark
- Died: 23 January 1997 (aged 66); Denmark
- Occupation: Actor
- Years active: 1956–1997

Hardy Rafn (17 September 1930 – 23 January 1997) was a Danish film actor. He appeared in 34 films between 1956 and 1997. He was born in Slagelse, Denmark and died in Denmark.

== Selected filmography ==
- Father of Four in the City (1956)
- Sømænd og svigermødre (1962)
- Der var engang (1966)
- Tintomara (1970)
- Me and the Mafia (1973)
- Piger i trøjen (1975)
- Eye of the Eagle (1997)
