= Ebbe Langberg =

Danish actor (1933–1989)

- Born: 1 August 1933; Copenhagen, Denmark
- Died: 3 February 1989 (aged 55); Hvidovre, Denmark
- Occupations: Actor; Film director
- Years active: 1946–1988

Ebbe Langberg (1 August 1933 – 3 February 1989) was a Danish actor and film director. He appeared in 45 films between 1946 and 1988.

== Career ==
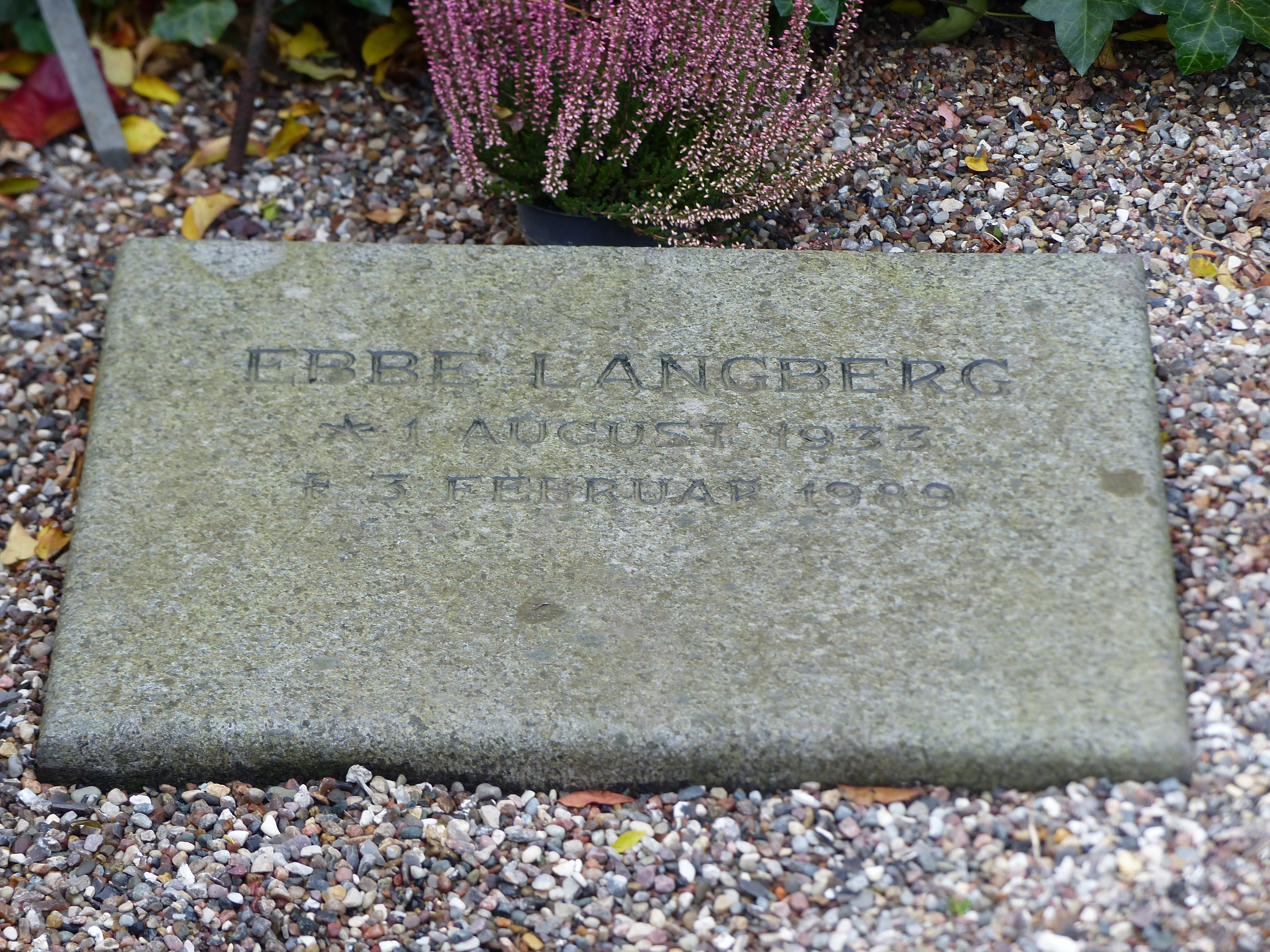

Langberg debuted as Lotte's little brother in Ditte menneskebarn (1946) and also starred as a child in the film De pokkers unger (1947). He became a trained actor from Odense Drama school and was then assigned to various theaters, including ABC Theatre, Odense Theatre, Great Hall, Aalborg Theatre, Circus Ib and the Apollo Theater.

He starred in around 40 films in the 1950s and 1960s, where he often played the cocky, real first love, who gets his beloved at the end.

In 1963 he made his debut as a film director with the film Peters landlov. He went on to direct seven feature films and was co-director on the TV series Ka' De li' østers? 1967 and Huset på Christianshavn.

From about 1981 to about 1989 he was director of the Rialto Theatre.

== Filmography ==
- The Girl in a Swing (1988)
- Skytten (1977)
- Det er så synd for farmand (1968)
- Jag – en älskare (1966)
- Pigen og millionæren (1965)
- En ven i bolignøden (1965)
- Don Olsen kommer til byen (1964)
- Mord for åbent tæppe (1964)
- Når enden er go' (1964)
- Majorens oppasser (1964)
- Frøken Nitouche (1963)
- Peters landlov (1963)
- Vi har det jo dejligt (1963)
- Drømmen om det hvide slot (1962)
- Oskar (1962)
- Soldaterkammerater på sjov (1962)
- Det stod i avisen (1962)
- Den rige enke (1962)
- Den kære familie (1962)
- Han, Hun, Dirch og Dario (1962)
- Landsbylægen (1961)
- Soldaterkammerater på efterårsmanøvre (1961)
- Sorte Shara (1961)
- Jetpiloter (1961)
- Min kone fra Paris (1961)
- Peters baby (1961)
- Komtessen (1961)
- Soldaterkammerater på vagt (1960)
- Sømand i knibe (1960)
- Charles' tante (1959)
- Soldaterkammerater rykker ud (1959)
- De sjove år (1959)
- Ballade på Bullerborg (1959)
- Styrmand Karlsen (1958)
- Soldaterkammerater (1958)
- Det lille hotel (1958)
- Mig og min familie (1957)
- Tre piger fra Jylland (1957)
- Flintesønnerne (1956)
- Far til fire i byen (1956)
- Vi som går stjernevejen (1956)
- Taxa K 1640 efterlyses (1956)
- The Crime of Tove Andersen (1953)
- Adam og Eva (1953)
- De pokkers unger (1947)
- Ditte menneskebarn (1946)
