= Story of Barbara =

1967 film

- Directed by: Palle Kjærulff-Schmidt
- Written by: Klaus Rifbjerg
- Produced by: Bo Christensen
- Starring: Yvonne Ingdal
- Cinematography: Claus Loof
- Edited by: Ole Steen
- Release date: 17 April 1967
- Running time: 84 minutes
- Country: Denmark
- Language: Danish

Story of Barbara (Danish: Historien om Barbara) is a 1967 Danish film directed by Palle Kjærulff-Schmidt. It was entered into the 17th Berlin International Film Festival.

== Cast ==
- Yvonne Ingdal as Barbara
- Peter Steen as Finn
- Ejner Federspiel as Barbara's Father
- Jørgen Buckhøj as Jørgen
- Hans Stephensen as Werner
- Lars Lunøe as Kjeld
- Thomas Nissen as Tom
- Allan De Waal as Gulle
