= Jørgen Beck =

Danish actor (1914–1991)

- Born: 13 December 1914; Roskilde, Denmark
- Died: 5 October 1991 (aged 76); Denmark
- Occupation: Actor
- Years active: 1945–1978

Jørgen Beck (13 December 1914 – 5 October 1991) was a Danish film actor. He appeared in 32 films between 1945 and 1978. He was born in Roskilde, Denmark and died in Denmark.

== Selected filmography ==
- Hvad vil De ha'? (1956)
- Pigen og vandpytten (1958)
- Vi er allesammen tossede (1959)
- Vi har det jo dejligt (1963)
- Sikke'n familie (1963)
- Once There Was a War (1966)
- The Man Who Thought Life (1969)
