= Preben Philipsen =

Danish film producer

- Born: 18 January 1910; Copenhagen, Denmark
- Died: 21 September 2005 (aged 95); Klampenborg, Denmark
- Occupation: Film producer
- Years active: 1949–1975

Constantin Preben Philipsen (18 January 1910 – 21 September 2005) was a Danish film producer. He produced 41 films between 1949 and 1975, and co-founded Constantin Film with Waldfried Barthel in 1950. He was born in Copenhagen, Denmark to Constantin Philipsen and his wife Marie Helene (née Elster) and died in Klampenborg.

== Selected filmography ==
- Willi Manages The Whole Thing (1972)
- The Body in the Thames (1971)
- Creature with the Blue Hand (1967)
- Don Olsen kommer til byen (1964)
- The Indian Scarf (1963)
- The Black Abbot (1963)
- The Squeaker (1963)
- Harry and the Butler (1961)
- Jetpiloter (1961)
- Our House in Cameroon (1961)
- The Devil's Daffodil (1961)
- Komtessen (1961)
- The Crimson Circle (1960)
- That Won't Keep a Sailor Down (1959)
- Tre må man være (1959)
- The Man Who Couldn't Say No (1958)
- Alt dette og Island med (1951)
- We Want a Child! (1949)
- Panik i familien (1945)
