= Morten Korch =

Danish writer (1876–1954)

- Born: Morten Luther Gudmund Korch; 17 January 1876; Over Holluf, Fyn, Denmark
- Died: 8 October 1954 (aged 78); Hellerup, Denmark
- Resting place: Fraugde, Fyn, Denmark
- Occupation: Writer
- Spouse(s): Elna Marie Løngreen Fyrdendahl; Sophie Petrea Bruun
- Writing career
- Genres: Fiction, Novel, Short Story
- Subject: Rural Denmark

Morten Luther Gudmund Korch (1876–1954) was a Danish writer who wrote populist stories and romances about rural Denmark. During his lifetime, he was the most widely read author in Denmark. Korch wrote 123 novels, several of which were made into popular films. In 1937, Korch was awarded a Danish knighthood in the Order of Dannebrog. He is listed in the book of The 20th century's 100 most important people in Denmark.

== Early life ==
Korch was born on 17 January 1876 in the small village of Over Holluf south east of Odense on the island of Fyn, Denmark. He was the son of a teacher and had seven siblings. At the age of 14, Korch left home and began an apprenticeship in business with his uncle in Nyborg. After finishing his apprenticeship, Korch worked for W. Løngreen in Odense, for whom he drove a horse-drawn wagon to farms selling various wares including porcelain and chemicals.

== Writing career ==
Korch's first story, Jule Toner (Sounds of Christmas) was published in 1892 and his first book of stories, Fyensk Humør (Humor of Fyn) was published in 1898. In 1916, at the age of 40, Korch decided to become a full-time author.

Korch was a writer of populist stories, which centered on the old-fashioned traditions of farms, small shops and rural merchants. His tales were built around the traditional adventure model of idyll-crisis-idyll. The characters tended to be stereotypes, and the problems clearly marked as a battle between good and evil which were always resolved happily. Beneath Korch's stories, there is a focus on the conservative patriarchal society and the belief in conservative Christian morals. Korch wrote 123 separate titles and sold more than 7 million books in Denmark alone. In 1937, Korch received a knighthood in the royal Danish society of Order of Dannebrog. By 1940, Korch was the mostly widely read author in Denmark, where he was known as "Denmark's Morten". From 1942 to 1947 he sat on the board of the Danish Writers Union.

== Legacy ==
Several of Korch's novels were developed into successful movies. In 1950, film director Alice O'Fredericks made the first film of a Korch novel: his 1943 book De røde heste (The Red Horses). The simple story—young newlyweds who try to save the family horse farm from bankruptcy by winning a racing derby—became the biggest box office success in Danish cinema. By 1976, eighteen films had been produced of Morten Korch stories. Danish Historian Ib Bundebjerg wrote that these combined "a special Danish popular comedy tradition with a reassuring portrayal of a rural environment at a time of frenzied modernisation."

In 1999, Korch was listed in the book of The 20th century's 100 most important people in Denmark.

== Personal life ==
In 1899 Korch married the niece of his first employer, Elna Marie Løngreen Fyrdendahl, with whom he had five children. After Elna died of tuberculosis in 1907, Korch married a second time, to Sophie Petrea Bruun in 1908 and they had two sons together. Sophie died in 1953, and one year later, on 8 October 1954, Korch died at the age of 78 in Hellerup near Copenhagen. He is buried in Fraugde, Fyn, the parish of his birth.

== Bibliography ==
- Regnebog for Almueskolernes yngste afdeling 1897
- Fyensk humør (short stories) 1898
- Fyenbosnak (oral stories) 1900
- Sin egen sti (short stories) 1911
- Guldglasuren (short story) 1912
- Sejrgaarden (novel) 1913
- En husmand 1914
- Grundlovsbogen 1914
- En æreskrans (short story) 1916
- Familien på Uglegården(novel) 1917
- Flintesønnerne (novel), 1917
- Hans med Sejrskjorten (novel) 1917
- En vagabond (short story) 1918
- Kongemøllen (novel) 1918
- Skytten på Urup (novel) 1918
- Fru Sara på Enø (short story) 1919
- Studeprangeren (short story) 1919
- Der brænder en ild (novel), 1920
- Forklarende tekst 1920
- Fra provinsen (short stories) 1920
- Godtfolk (short stories) 1920
- Krybskytten 1920
- Kong Frederiks Korporal (novel and 2 stories) 1921
- Uhrene i Rørby (novel)1921
- Junker & Co (novel) 1922
- Bent Billes løfte 1923
- Det gamle guld (novel), 1923
- Den grønne vogn 1924
- Fortællinger og skitser (short stories) 1924
- Godtfolk : ny samling 1924
- Niels Dros (novel), 1924
- Om fyenske dialekter 1925
- Rolf Snare 1925
- Palle Jarmer (novel) 1925
- Kærlighed (2 stories) 1926
- To juleaftener 1926
- Lykkens hjul (novel) 1926
- Den danske jul 1927
- Manden på Brusholm 1927
- Perler paa snor (novel), 1927
- I stjerneskær (novel), 1928
- Fynboer 1929
- Landsbyprinsessen (stage play) 1929
- Lykkesmeden (novel), 1929
- Affæren i Mølleby (stage play) 1930
- Ved Stillebækken (novel), 1930
- Guldskoen (stage play) 1931
- Kærlille (novel), 1931
- I morgen får vi sol 1932
- Klokkekilden 1933
- Borgerlune 1934
- Liv og lune (short stories) 1934
- Blomstrende verden 1934
- Byens bedste mand (short story) 1935
- Møllen i Lunde 1935
- Det fejreste træ 1935
- De rige år 1936
- Krisen på Rønnebæk (stage play) 1936
- Lykkens luner (stage play) 1936
- Troldsmeden (stage play) 1936
- Fruen på Hamre 1937
- Bonden fra Dige (novel) 1938
- Pigen fra Dale 1938
- Bertil Lynge 1939
- Hammerprinsessen 1939
- Kampen om Abildgaarden (novel), 1939
- Indenfor voldene 1940
- Under byens tage (novel) 1941
- Lykkens hjul 1942
- Det gamle teglværk 1942
- De røde heste 1943
- Den lille julegæst 1943
- Landsbyfolk 1943
- Ved den blaa fjord 1943
- Sønnen fra Vingaarden 1944
- Roman om Nikolaj (novel) 1944
- Fynboer (short stories) 1946
- Klokken paa Solbjerg 1946
- Manden paa Naur 1946
- Det store løb 1947
- Fortryllende dage (short stories) 1948
- Min moders minde (essays) 1948
- Morten Korch : 1898 - 22. September 1948 1948
- Mosekongen 1948
- Doktor Ole 1949
- Julekurven 1949
- Fløjtespilleren (novel) 1950
- Troldpigen 1951
- Kampen om Torndal 1952
- Frodige dage 1952
