= Bent Christensen (director) =

- Born: 28 May 1929; Gunderup, Denmark
- Died: 6 January 1992 (aged 62); Keldernæs, Denmark
- Occupation(s): Film director, actor
- Years active: 1953 – 1990

Bent Christensen (28 May 1929 – 6 January 1992) was a Danish film director, actor, film producer and screenwriter. His film Harry and the Butler (1961) was named Best Film at the Bodil Awards and was nominated for the Academy Award for Best Foreign Language Film. His 1966 film Neighbours was entered into the 5th Moscow International Film Festival.

== Selected filmography ==
- We Who Go the Kitchen Route (1953)
- Der kom en dag (1955)
- The Last Winter (1960)
- Harry and the Butler (1961)
- Neighbours (1966)
