= List of Danish films before 1910 =

The following table is a list of films produced in Denmark or in the Danish language before 1910. For an alphabetical list of all Danish films currently on Wikipedia see Category:Danish films. For Danish films from other decades see the Cinema of Denmark box above.

Danish title	English title	Director(s)	Cast	Genre	Notes
1897
Kørsel med Grønlandske Hunde	Traveling with Greenlandic Dogs	Peter Elfelt	Johan Carl Joensen	Documentary	First Danish film
Brandvæsnet rykker ud	The Fire department Moves Out	Peter Elfelt		Documentary	
1899
Brydekamp	Wrestling	Peter Elfelt	Magnus Bech-Olsen	Documentary	
Kongelige skal fotograferes	Photographing the Royal Family	Peter Elfelt	Christian IX of Denmark, Dagmar of Denmark, Nicholas II of Russia, Alexandra of Denmark	Documentary	
1900
Vagtparaden paa Amalienborg		Peter Elfelt		Documentary	
1901
Fru Anna Larssen i sit Paaklædningsværelse		Peter Elfelt	Anna Larssen Bjørner	Documentary	
Tietgens Bisættelse		Peter Elfelt	P.A. Alberti, Benny Dessau, King Christian X, King Frederik VIII	Documentary	
1902
Rideklubben ved Nærumgaard		Peter Elfelt		Documentary	
1903
Henrettelsen	Capital Execution	Peter Elfelt	Francesca Nathansen, Victor Betzonich	Drama	First Danish feature film
Dagmar Hansen		Peter Elfelt	Dagmar Hansen	Documentary	
Kongejagt paa Hveen	Royal Shooting Party on Hveen	Peter Elfelt	King Oscar II, King Christian X, Prins Valdemar	Documentary	
1906
Anarkistens Svigermor		Viggo Larsen	Viggo Larsen, Margrete Jespersen	Short film	
1907
Løvejagten	The Lion Hunt	Viggo Larsen	Viggo Larsen; Knud Lumbye	Drama	Banned in Denmark
1908
En grov Spøg	A Practical Joke and a Sad End	Viggo Larsen	Holger-Madsen, Knud Lumbye, Aage Brandt	Short film	
1909
Barnet som Velgører		Viggo Larsen	Aage Brandt, Kai Voigt	Drama	
