= Cinema of Denmark =

- No. of screens: 458 (2017)
  - Per capita: 7.9 per 100,000 (2011)
- Main distributors: SF Film 30.0% Nordisk Film 25.0% Buena Vista 22.0%

Produced feature films (2011)
- Fictional: 25 (58.1%)
- Documentary: 18 (41.9%)

Number of admissions (2011)
- Total: 12,433,000
  - Per capita: 2.4 (2012)
- National films: 3,363,000 (27.0%)

Gross box office (2011)
- Total: DKK 750 million (~€100.7 million)
- National films: DKK 186 million (~€25.0 million) (24.9%)

Denmark has been producing films since 1897 and since the 1980s has maintained a steady stream of product due largely to funding by the state-supported Danish Film Institute. Historically, Danish films have been noted for their realism, religious and moral themes, sexual frankness and technical innovation.

The Danish filmmaker Carl Theodor Dreyer (1889–1968) is considered amongst the greatest directors in the history of cinema. Other Danish filmmakers of note include Benjamin Christensen, who outside his native country directed several horror classics including Häxan (1922) and Seven Footprints to Satan (1929); Erik Balling, the creator of the popular Olsen-banden films; Gabriel Axel, an Oscar-winner for Babette's Feast in 1987; and Bille August, the Oscar, Palme d'Or and Golden Globe-winner for Pelle the Conqueror in 1988.

In 1995, Danish filmmakers Lars von Trier and Thomas Vinterberg founded the avant-garde Dogme 95 film movement, promoting a manifesto that emphasised the traditional values of story, acting, and theme; simultaneously denouncing the use of elaborate special effects or post-production. It was supposedly created as an attempt to "take back power for the directors as artists" as opposed to the production company. Although few of their films have rigidly adhered to the movement's rules, many of their works have received critical acclaim and multiple awards. von Trier's Dancer in the Dark (2000) won the Palme d'Or, while Vinterberg's Another Round (2020) won the Academy Award for Best International Feature Film. Renowned Danish actor Mads Mikkelsen won the Cannes Film Festival Award for Best Actor for his performance in Vinterberg's The Hunt (2012).

Additionally, modern-day directors from Denmark who have enjoyed both domestic and international successess include Nicolas Winding Refn, Susanne Bier, Lone Scherfig and Anders Thomas Jensen.

== History ==
=== Beginnings ===
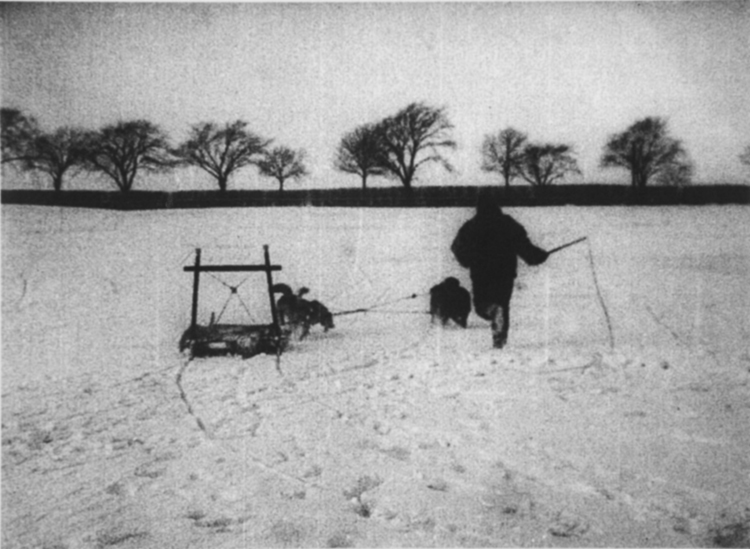
Screenshot from the 1897 film Kørsel med Grønlandske Hunde

Danish cinema pioneer Peter Elfelt, a photographer, was the first Dane to make a film. Between the years of 1896 and 1912, he produced around 200 documentary films on life in Denmark. His first film was Kørsel med Grønlandske Hunde (Traveling with Greenlandic Dogs). Furthermore, he produced the first Danish feature film: Henrettelsen (Capital Execution, 1903). The first film show in Denmark took place in the Panorama cinema on the Town Hall square in Copenhagen, in June 1896. However, the selection of films had been made and produced abroad.

=== The Golden Age ===
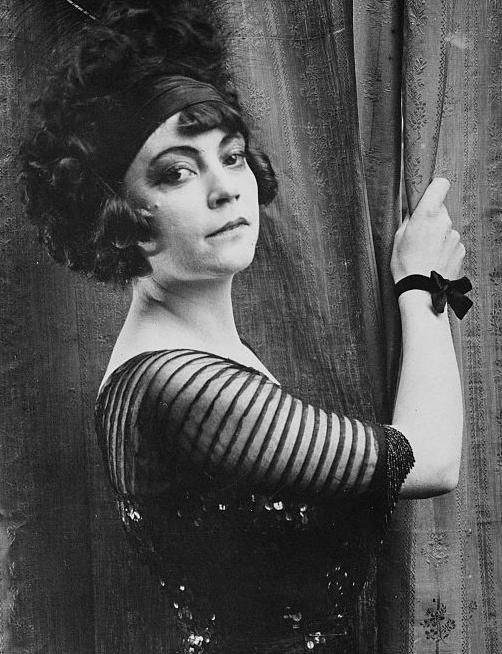
Europe's first female film star was Danish actress Asta Nielsen.

Despite the small size of its native market and its relatively limited resources, Denmark reigned supreme for several years (1909-14) as Europe's most prosperous film center. Its films rivaled those of Hollywood, for popularity on the screens of Paris, London, Berlin and New York.

— Efraim Katz, Film Encyclopedia, 1998, Collins, ISBN 0-06-273492-X

In 1906, cinema owner Ole Olsen founded the first Danish film-making company, Nordisk Films Kompagni. It gained most of its income from the export market of short films. Two of Olsen's silent stars were Valdemar Psilander and Else Frölich, who often worked together. Not until 1909 were other film-producing companies established. In 1910 the number had reached ten. This period is now known as the Golden Age of Danish Cinema. In the spring of 1910, Nordisk Films Kompagni changed its policy of producing only short films and began making feature films. This was largely inspired by the Århus Fotorama company's Den hvide Slavehandel (The White Slave Trade, 1910), which was the first multi-reel Danish film lasting more than 30 minutes.

With the increasing length of films, there was a growing artistic awareness, which is evident in Afgrunden (The Abyss, 1910). This film launched the career of Asta Nielsen, who soon became Europe's first great female film star. The film was an erotic melodrama, which soon became the preferred genre in early Danish cinema. In 1911, with director August Blom as the new head of production, Nordisk Film was the first of the major European companies to devote itself entirely to full-length feature films. These films were sold abroad profitably because the technical and photographic quality impressed audiences. Yet, when exporting the films, the erotic elements needed to be toned down in order not to offend the working class audiences. In 1913, Nordisk released the first full-length feature movie, Atlantis directed by Blom.

After 1913, Danish cinema began to lose its leading foothold in the film industry, with foreign companies having intensified competition in the production of feature-length films. Danish cinema had also begun to suffer from a lack of imagination and a willingness to take creative risks on the part of Danish producers. Independent producer Benjamin Christensen had great success with the spy film Det hemmelighedsfulde X (The Mysterious X or Sealed Orders, 1914) and the crime drama Hævnens Nat (Blind Justice or The Night of Revenge, 1916), both of which are major works in the history of the Danish cinema; he would later direct several films in Sweden and Hollywood.

=== 1920s through 1940s ===
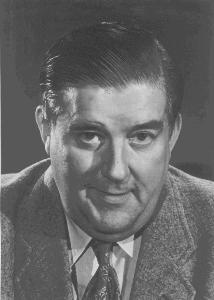
Danish movie star Ib Schønberg

During World War I, the USA became the leading nation in film production and Danish exports decreased. In the years following the war, Dreyer made an appearance as director at Nordisk Film with the drama Præsidenten (The President, 1919), followed by the ambitious Blade af Satans Bog (Leaves from Satan's Book, 1921), inspired by the American director D. W. Griffith's Intolerance (1916) in both technique and theme. However, Dreyer, as well as Benjamin Christensen, were not permanently connected to the influential Danish film industries and remained loners. As a whole, Danish film in the 1920s was on the decline in spite of the filmmakers' better technical skills. Of most interest at this time were perhaps the so-called Dickens movies directed by the very able A. W. Sandberg. At one point Denmark again enjoyed some international reputation, by the many farces of the vagabond duo Fyrtaarnet og Bivognen (often known by their French names Doublepatte and Patachon), who were Scandinavian predecessors of Laurel and Hardy. They were introduced by Palladium, the rival of Nordisk Film. Despite these resurgences, at the end of the decade the Danish film industry was on its heels.

In 1929, Nordisk Film Kompagni was established as a sound film company. The Pastor of Vejlby (1931) reinforced the Nordisk's dominance in the Danish market. The 1930s were dominated by many successes with light comedies. The so-called "folkekomedie" (folk comedy) genre was born, with Barken Margrethe (1934) an important early example. The Depression and the economic conditions of the film companies prevented more serious film business, and the victory of the sound movie automatically set greater limits on the international possibilities of Danish film. Many popular stars like Marguerite Viby, Ib Schønberg and Peter Malberg had breakthroughs but in spite of many economic successes no further development of the media was seen.

Between 1940 and 1945, the German occupation of Denmark during World War II pushed the film industry toward more serious subject matter. The darker tone during these years paralleled the rise of film noir in Hollywood. Bodil Ipsen made her directorial mark with 1942's Afsporet, the first Danish film noir, and continued with the psychological thriller Melody of Murder (1944). The standard of the comedy was also lifted, especially by the witty, elegant movies of Johan Jacobsen, a Danish pupil of Ernst Lubitsch. After the war ended, there was a movement toward realism and social criticism, particularly noted in films directed by Ole Palsbo. Soon, however, Denmark's film industry returned to making the light sentimental comedies and uncomplicated regionalist movies that were popular with Danish filmgoers.

=== 1950s to 1970s ===
A large stream of family comedies ("Lystspil") and class-conscious folk comedies ("folkekomedier") were produced from the 1950s to late 1970s/early 1980s. Here a lot of Danish stars were born, such as Dirch Passer, Ove Sprogøe and director Erik Balling. Important films of this period include De røde heste (1950), Far til fire (1953), Kispus (1956, first Danish film in colour), Støv på hjernen (1961), Sommer i Tyrol (1964), Passer passer piger (1965), SS Martha (1967), the Olsen-banden-series (1968–1981) and Erik Balling's classic TV-sitcom Huset på Christianshavn (1970–1977).

In the sixties, Danish cinema became gradually more erotic, with films such as Halløj i himmelsengen (Erik Balling, 1965), Sytten (Annelise Meinecke, 1965), Jeg – en kvinde (Mac Ahlberg, 1965) and Uden en trævl (Annelise Meinecke, 1968), several of which made a huge international impression. As a natural progression, in 1969 Denmark became the first country to completely legalize pornography. In the 1970s, a large percentage of all Danish films were sexually oriented, and many mainstream-features with mainstream-actors included sequences with either softcore- or hardcore-pornography, most notably Mazurka på sengekanten (John Hilbard, 1970) and I Jomfruens tegn (Finn Karlsson, 1973) along with their many respective sequels, forming the eight Bedside-films and six Zodiac-films.

"In 1970–74, about a third of all Danish feature film productions were pornographically minded, followed by a sudden drop-off."

— Carl Nørrested, Kosmorama No. 195, 1991

In 1972, the Danish Film Institute (DFI) was founded to provide state subsidies for hand-picked films. It allocated public funding for feature films based on their artistic merit rather than commercial appeal—with an emphasis on those films which expressed Danish culture and identity. The DFI reinvigorated the financial viability of the sagging Danish film industry, but later was criticized for becoming too conservative and nationalistic in defining which films represented Danish identity. In one example, Lars von Trier's 1984 debut feature The Element of Crime struggled to receive funds because it was radically different from the typical Danish film—and, yet, received international acclaim upon release. In response, the Ministry of Culture in 1989 vastly broadened the DFI's definition of "Danish film" to include any work which contributed to Danish film culture. This allowed state funding of films with greater global appeal and helped foster the international success of a new wave of Danish filmmakers.

With La' os være ("Let us be") (Ernst Johansen & Lasse Nielsen, 1975), independent producer Steen Herdel launched a wave of successful teenage-dramas, including Måske ku' vi ("Maybe we could") (Morten Arnfred, 1976), Du er ikke alene ("You Are Not Alone") (Ernst Johansen & Lasse Nielsen, 1978), Mig og Charly ("Me and Charly") (Morten Arnfred & Henning Kristiansen, 1978) and Vil du se min smukke navle? ("Do you want to see my beautiful bellybutton?") (Søren Kragh-Jacobsen, 1978), all produced by Steen Herdel.

A notable TV series, Matador, ran from 1978 to 1982, and has remained a national favourite. It was directed by Erik Balling.

=== The 1980s ===
Since the start of the 1980s, the Danish film industry has been completely dependent on state funding through Det Danske Filminstitut. A project usually does not get made unless the script, director and cast etc. has been approved by the appointed representatives of the Danish Film Institute. This means that Danish filmmaking is essentially controlled by the state.

In 1983, Lars von Trier graduated from Den Danske Filmskole (National Film School of Denmark) and received international attention with films such as Forbrydelsens element (1984) and Epidemic (1987). His strange, innovative ideas were fiercely resisted by Det Danske Filminstitut and drew very small local audiences, but were embraced by the Cannes Film Festival, where his films were included in the official selections and took home awards.

Released in 1987 was the gay teenage drama Venner for altid ("Friends Forever"), directed by Stefan Henszelman (1960–1991). It won the 1988 Audience Award as Best Feature at the San Francisco International Lesbian & Gay Film Festival.

The Danish film industry got a major boost in the late 1980s when the movie Babettes Gæstebud (Babette's Feast), directed by Gabriel Axel, won an Academy Award for Best Foreign Film in 1987, and next year the Best Foreign Film award went to Pelle Erobreren (Pelle the Conqueror), directed by Bille August.

In the late 1980s and early 1990s, more talented directors started graduating from the National Film School of Denmark, such as Thomas Vinterberg, Per Fly and Ole Christian Madsen.

Also in the late 1980s, Danish cinematographer Mikael Salomon ended a long career in Danish cinema to become one of Hollywood's most celebrated DPs, later establishing himself as a successful, Emmy Award-winning television director.

=== The 1990s ===
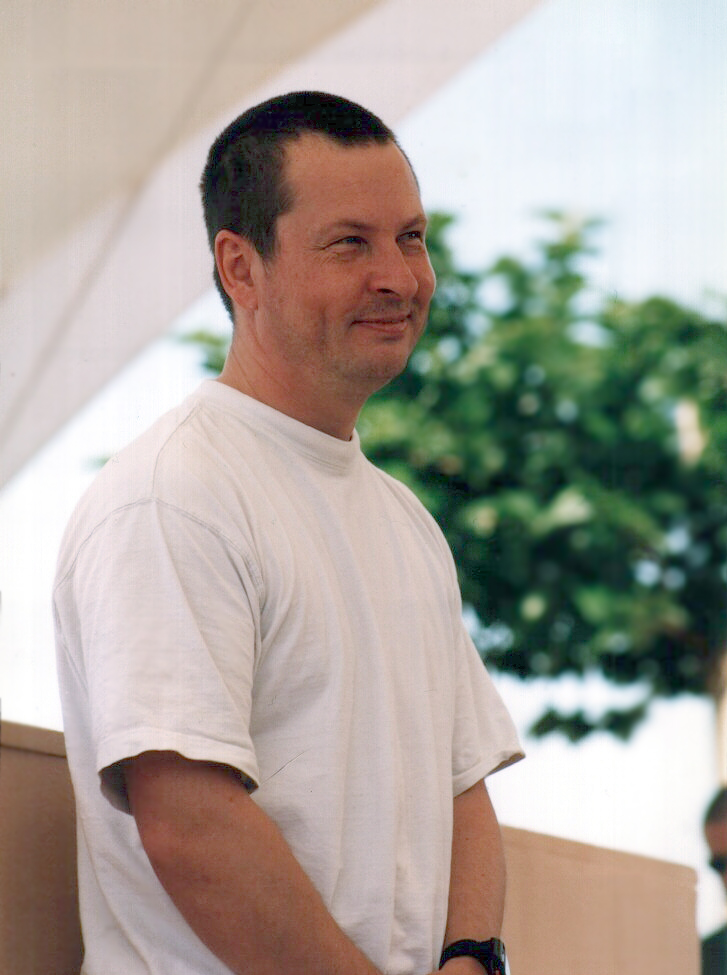
Danish director Lars von Trier

Danish film in the 1990s was dominated by Lars von Trier. His films Europa, Breaking the Waves, The Idiots, and Dancer in the Dark received great international attention and were nominated for numerous awards.

The Dogme 95 Collective caught the attention of the international film world with its strict "vows of chastity" or rules for filmmakers that force filmmakers to concentrate on purity of story and the actors' performances rather than special effects and other cinematic devices.

The first Dogme 95 film, The Celebration (Festen), directed by Thomas Vinterberg, received many awards on the international film festival circuit and was named by both the Los Angeles Film Critics Association and the New York Film Critics Circle as the best foreign-language film of the year.

The members of the Dogme 95 Collective were von Trier, Vinterberg, Kristian Levring, and Søren Kragh-Jacobsen. Although the Dogme 95 movement originated in Denmark, filmmakers around the world soon experimented with the rigid guidelines and sought certification for their films as Dogme. Furthermore, Lars von Trier's own Dogme-film Idioterne (1998) started a separate wave of arthouse mainstream films with unsimulated sex.

Lars von Trier also made history by having his company Zentropa be the world's first mainstream film company to produce hardcore pornographic films. Three of these films, Constance (1998), Pink Prison (1999) and the adult/mainstream crossover-feature All About Anna (2005), were made primarily for a female audience, and were extremely successful in Europe, with the two first being directly responsible for the March 2006 legalizing of pornography in Norway.

"Women too like to see other people having sex. What they don't like is the endless close-ups of hammering bodyparts without a story. Lars von Trier is the first to have realised this and produced valuable quality porn films for women."

— Stern No. 40, 27 September 2007

=== The 21st century ===
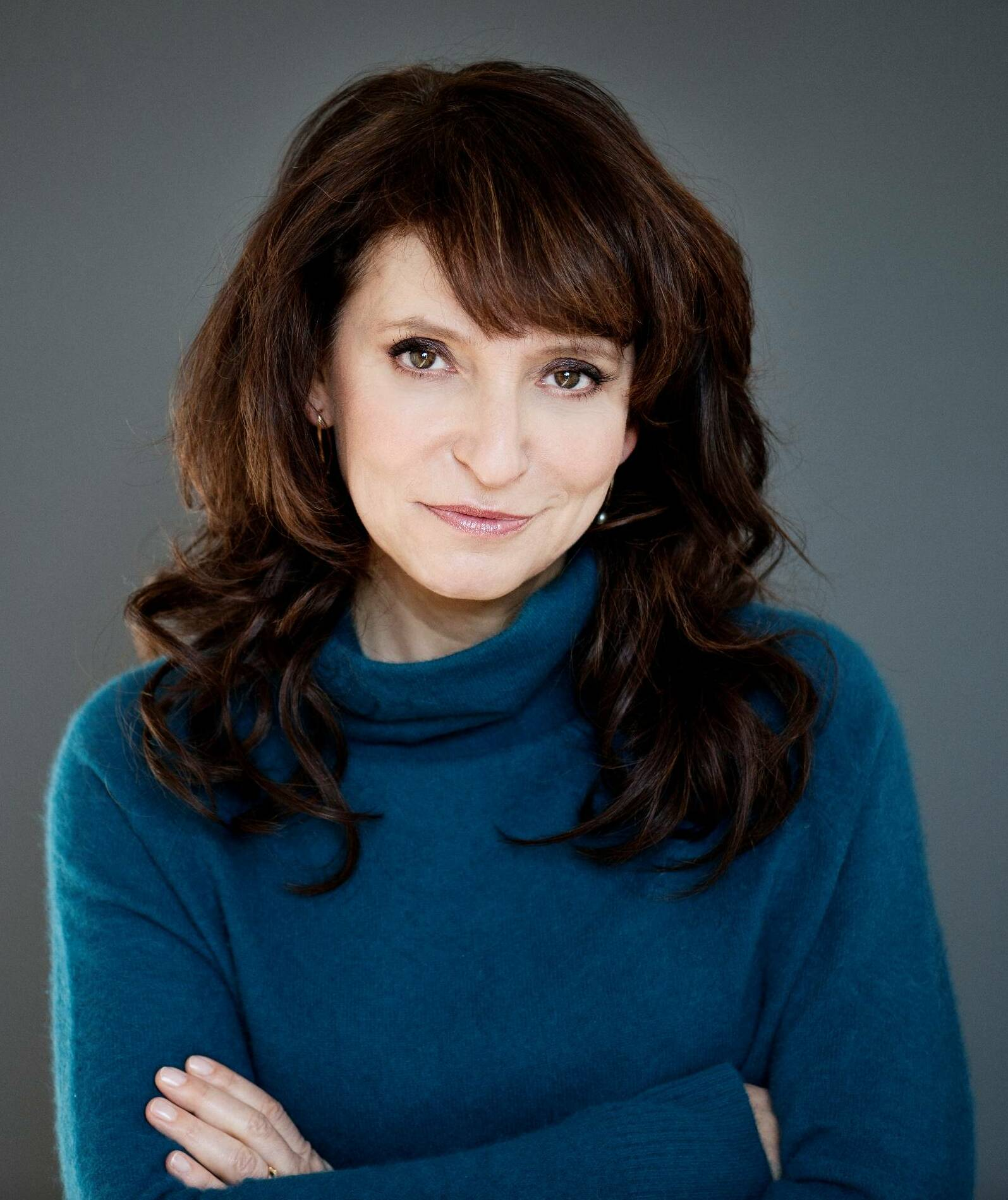
Susanne Bier, director of Brothers and After the Wedding

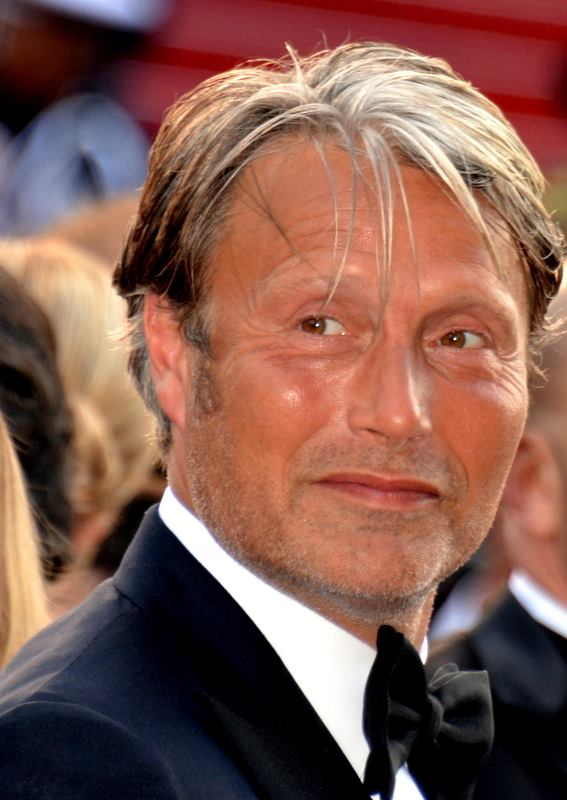
Mads Mikkelsen gained global recognition for his role as Le Chiffre in the 2006 James Bond film Casino Royale

A trilogy directed by Per Fly, The Bench (Bænken) (2000), Inheritance (Arven) (2003), and Manslaughter (Drabet) (2005) portrayed Denmark's three distinct social classes and received international acclaim.

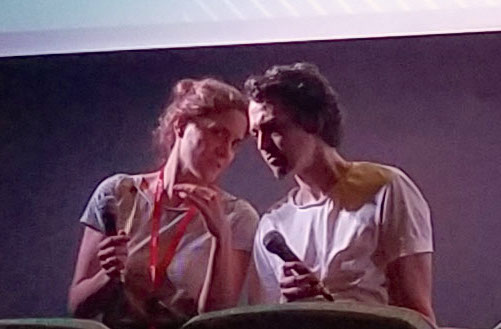
Johannes Nyholm (right) presenting Swedish-Danish film Koko-di Koko-da at Buenos Aires International Festival of Independent Cinema, 2019

The work of Susanne Bier, particularly Brothers (2004) and After the Wedding (2006), introduced the world to Danish actors such as Mads Mikkelsen, Ulrich Thomsen, and Nikolaj Lie Kaas. After the Wedding was nominated for the Academy Award for Best Foreign Language Film. Bier's In a Better World (Danish: Hævnen, meaning "The Revenge") is a 2010 drama starring Mikael Persbrandt, Trine Dyrholm and Ulrich Thomsen in a story which takes place in small-town Denmark and a refugee camp in Sudan. The film won the 2011 Golden Globe Award for Best Foreign Language Film and the Best Foreign Language Film at the 83rd Academy Awards.

Anders Thomas Jensen received acclaim as Oscar-winning writer-director of three short films, Ernst & lyset (1996), Wolfgang (1997) and Valgaften (1998), and as screenwriter of such feature films as Mifune's Last Song (1999), Open Hearts (2002), Wilbur Wants to Kill Himself (2002), Stealing Rembrandt (2003) and Brothers (2004); and as a director of dark and profound feature comedies like The Green Butchers (2003) and Adam's Apples (2005).

Other notable Danish directors of the 21st century include Nikolaj Arcel, Christoffer Boe, Lone Scherfig, Niels Arden Oplev, Nicolas Winding Refn, Ole Christian Madsen, Annette K. Olesen and Christian E. Christiansen.

The 2000s proved difficult for numerous Danish directors, including Lars von Trier, although things started well with Dogville (2003), a provocative and stylistic experimental film filmed on a black sound stage with little beyond white floor markings to indicate the sets. Its sequel Manderlay (2005), exploring the issue of slavery, continued this stylistic device but was largely ignored by audiences. A change of leadership at the Danish Film Institute in late 2007 was seen by many as an opportunity for reflection and renewal, while others pointed to the generally healthy local box office numbers and denied any crisis. Danish tabloid Jyllands-Posten concluded the situation to be a "krise i en opgangstid" (crisis in a time of growth).

In 2008, Danish films sold over 4 million tickets at the domestic box office, the biggest number since 1981, but this turned out to be a brief respite as Danish films in the first five months of 2009 turned out to have the lowest ticket sales since 2005. Film critic Henrik Queitsch agreed that there was some reason for concern, noting in the Danish Film Institute's monthly program that "the different, the surprising, the odd and the daring" was hardly what characterised Danish films of 2008.

Thomas Vinterberg, who had established himself worldwide with The Celebration (1998), made two high budget English-language films that underperformed at the box office, It's All About Love (2003) and Dear Wendy (2005) then retraced his roots with a smaller Danish-language production, A Man Comes Home (2007), which also underperformed, selling only 28,472 tickets. Around the same time as Vinterberg's box office failures, Bille August, Lone Scherfig, and Lars von Trier also made Danish-language films that underperformed both financially and with the critics, leading the Danish financial times Børsen to observe on 19 September 2007 that "1990'ernes filmfest er forbi" (the film party of the 1990s has ended).

Vinterberg returned to prominence with his 2012 feature The Hunt, which was a major box office success and received international critical acclaim. Mads Mikkelsen received the Best Actor award at the 2012 Cannes Film Festival for his performance as Lucas, a man wrongly accused of paedophilia and ostracised by his community. With a budget of $3.8 million, the film made over $16 million worldwide. The film was also chosen as Denmark's submission for an Academy Award for Best International Feature Film in 2013, for which it was nominated.

In 2021, Vinterberg's Another Round won the Academy Award for Best International Feature Film at the 93rd Academy Awards. The film was another global success, being nominated for four BAFTA awards, winning the BAFTA Award for Best Film Not in the English Language as well as winning the Best Film award at BFI London Film Festival in 2020. Despite COVID restrictions by the opening weekend, the film had sold 102,366 tickets, including 13,400 tickets in previews in Denmark, thereby achieving the biggest opening weekend for a Danish drama in seven years. The film was also selected for the 2020 Cannes Film Festival, but due to its cancellation, it then made its premiere at the 2020 Toronto International Film Festival.

== Danish Film Institute ==
Danish filmmaking remains influenced by the state through the Danish Film Institute (DFI), which was founded in 1972. DFI is Denmark's national agency for film and cinema culture, operating under the Ministry of Culture. DFI supports the development, production and distribution of films and run the national archives.

Support programmes also extend to international co-productions film education and international promotion at film festivals. The DFI includes a library, a stills and posters archive and a film archive. The DFI Film House is open to the public and houses the national Cinematheque.

The DFI supports the production of 20-25 feature films and 25-30 documentary and short films every year. There are three kinds of support: the film commissioner scheme, the market scheme and the talent development scheme at New Danish Screen.

The DFI encourages international partnerships and allows for 5-9 minor co-productions in feature film and 4-6 minor co-productions in documentary film per year.

A cornerstone of Danish film policy is to fund children and youth films to which 25 percent of all subsidies are allocated.

DFI has received criticism for lack of innovation (notably, Dogme 95 happened in spite of funding from the Film Institute) and is sometimes accused of nepotism and cronyism, for example when film commissioner Mikael Olsen from 1998 to 1999 greenlighted 28 million kroner of subsidy money to his childhood-friend Peter Aalbæk Jensen, then went on to work for him in a high-ranking position.

The Danish Film Institute however has also achieved a high level of professionalism even if more or less reserved for a few selected genres and production companies (mainly Nordisk Film, Zentropa and Nimbus Film). In February 2008, Nordisk Film bought half of Zentropa, which frequently coproduces with Nimbus Film, but such tax-funded, state-sanctioned monopolies are rarely frowned upon in Denmark.

== Nominations and awards ==
=== Danish directors nominated for Academy Award for Best Director ===
- 2020 - Thomas Vinterberg, Another Round

=== Danish films nominated for César Award for Best Foreign Film ===
- 1997 - Breaking the Waves (Lars von Trier) (won)
- 1999 - The Celebration (Thomas Vinterberg)
- 2001 - Dancer in the Dark (Lars von Trier)

=== Danish films nominated for César Award for Best European Union Film ===
- 2004 - Dogville (Lars von Trier)

=== Danish films nominated for Academy Award for Best International Feature film ===
- 1956 - Qivitoq (Erik Balling)
- 1959 - Paw (Astrid Henning-Jensen)
- 1961 - Harry and the Butler (Bent Christensen)
- 1987 - Babette's Feast (Gabriel Axel) (won)
- 1988 - Pelle the Conqueror (Bille August) (won)
- 1989 - Waltzing Regitze (Kaspar Rostrup)
- 1996 - All Things Fair (Bo Widerberg) (Swedish/Danish coproduction)
- 2007 - After the Wedding (Susanne Bier)
- 2011 - In a Better World (Susanne Bier) (won)
- 2013 - A Royal Affair (Nikolaj Arcel)
- 2014 - The Hunt (Thomas Vinterberg)
- 2016 - A War (Tobias Lindholm)
- 2017 - Land of Mine (Martin Zandvliet)
- 2021 - Another Round (Thomas Vinterberg) (won)
- 2022 - Flee (Jonas Poher Rasmussen)

=== Danish films nominated for Best European film ===
- 1988 - Pelle the Conqueror (Bille August)
- 1996 - Breaking the Waves (Lars von Trier) (won)
- 1998 - The Celebration (Thomas Vinterberg)
- 1999 - Mifune's Last Song (Søren Kragh-Jacobsen)
- 2000 - Dancer in the Dark (Lars von Trier) (won)
- 2001 - Italian for Beginners (Lone Scherfig)
- 2002 - Lilja 4-ever (Lukas Moodysson) (Swedish/Danish/Estonian coproduction)
- 2003 - Dogville (Lars von Trier)
- 2004 - A Hole in My Heart (Lukas Moodysson) (Swedish/Danish coproduction)
- 2005 - Brothers (Susanne Bier)
- 2011 - In a Better World (Susanne Bier)
- 2011 - Melancholia (Lars von Trier) (won)
- 2012 - The Hunt (Thomas Vinterberg)
- 2014 - Nymphomaniac (Lars von Trier)
- 2014 - Force Majeure (Ruben Östlund) (Swedish/Danish/Norwegian/French coproduction)
- 2015 - Rams (Grímur Hákonarson) (Icelandish/Danish coproduction)
- 2017 - The Square (Ruben Östlund) (Swedish/French/German/Danish coproduction)
- 2018 - Border (Ali Abbasi) (Swedish/Danish coproduction)
- 2020 - Another Round (Thomas Vinterberg) (won)

=== Danish directors nominated for Best European Director ===
- 2003 - Lars von Trier, Dogville (won)
- 2005 - Susanne Bier, Brothers
- 2006 - Susanne Bier, After the Wedding
- 2009 - Lars von Trier, Antichrist
- 2011 - Susanne Bier, In a Better World (won)
- 2011 - Lars von Trier, Melancholia
- 2012 - Thomas Vinterberg, The Hunt
- 2018 - Ali Abbasi, Border
- 2020 - Thomas Vinterberg, Another Round (won)

=== Sundance Film Festival awards ===
On 30 January 2010 in Los Angeles, Mads Brügger's "The Red Chapel," (Danish: Det Røde Kapel) won the grand jury prize for the best world documentary at the Sundance Film Festival. Presenting a comic approach to a group's visit to North Korea, the film explores the development of an enigmatic and totalitarian country.

In 2018, "The Guilty" (Danish: Den Skyldige), a Danish production directed by Swedish debutant Gustav Möller, won the World Cinema dramatic Audience Award.

== See also ==
Awards

- Bodil Awards
- Robert Awards

Festivals

- CPH:DOX

Institutions/Organizations

- Danish Film Academy
- Danish Film Institute

Lists

- List of Academy Award winners and nominees from Denmark
- List of Danish actors
- List of Danish film directors
- List of Nordic Academy Award winners and nominees
- Lists of Danish films

Movements/Subgenres

- Dogme 95

== Sources ==
- David Bordwell: Essay on Danish Cinema, in Film #55, Denmark 2007
- Marguerite Engberg: Dansk stumfilm. De store år, vol. 1–2. Copenh. 1977 (summary in English)
- Hjort, Mette; Lindqvist, Ursula, eds. (2016). A Companion to Nordic Cinema. Malden, Massachusetts: Wiley Blackwell. ISBN 9781118475256.
- Passek, Jean-Loup, ed. (1979). Le cinéma danois. Paris: Centre national d'art et de culture Georges Pompidou. ISBN 9782858500130. OCLC 6486767.
- Ebbe Villadsen: Danish Erotic Film Classics (2005)
