= Kongstad =

Kongstad is a surname. Notable people with the surname include:

- Jesper Kongstad (fl. 2009), Danish civil servant
- Kristian Kongstad (1867–1929), Danish printer and illustrator
- Tobias Kongstad (born 1996), Danish racing cyclist
