= Vestergade 3 =

Neoclassical property in the Old Town of Copenhagen, Denmark

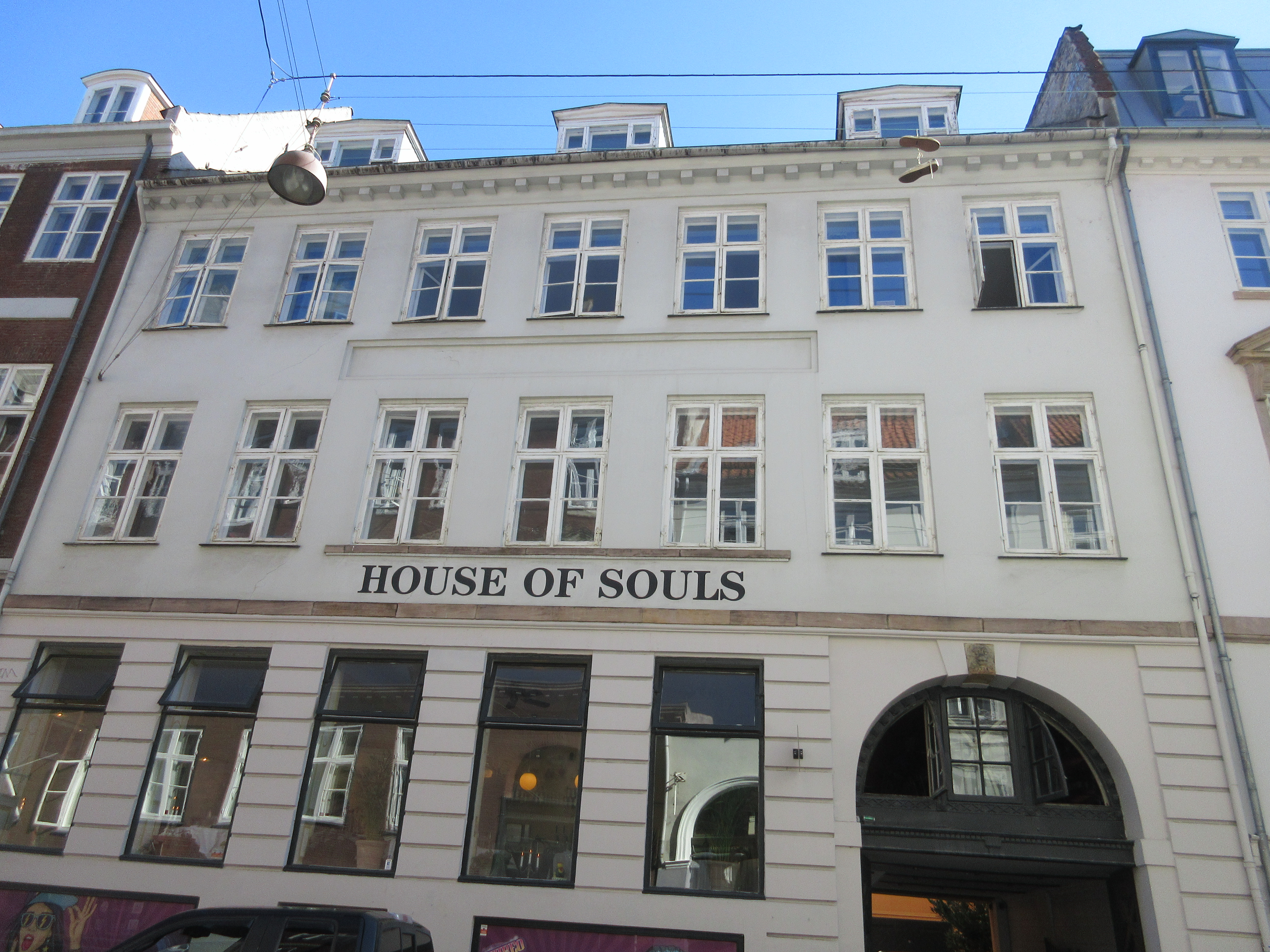
- Interactive map of the Vestergade 3 area

General information
- Location: Copenhagen, Denmark
- Coordinates: 55°40′41″N 12°34′16″E
- Completed: 1796

Vestergade 3 is a Neoclassical property in the Old Town of Copenhagen, Denmark. The building was constructed as part of the rebuilding of the city following the Copenhagen Fire of 1795. It was listed in the Danish registry of protected buildings and places in 1959. Notable former residents include the clergy Christian Bastholm and the painters Albert Küchler and Jørgen Roed.

== History ==
=== Site history, 1689–1795 ===
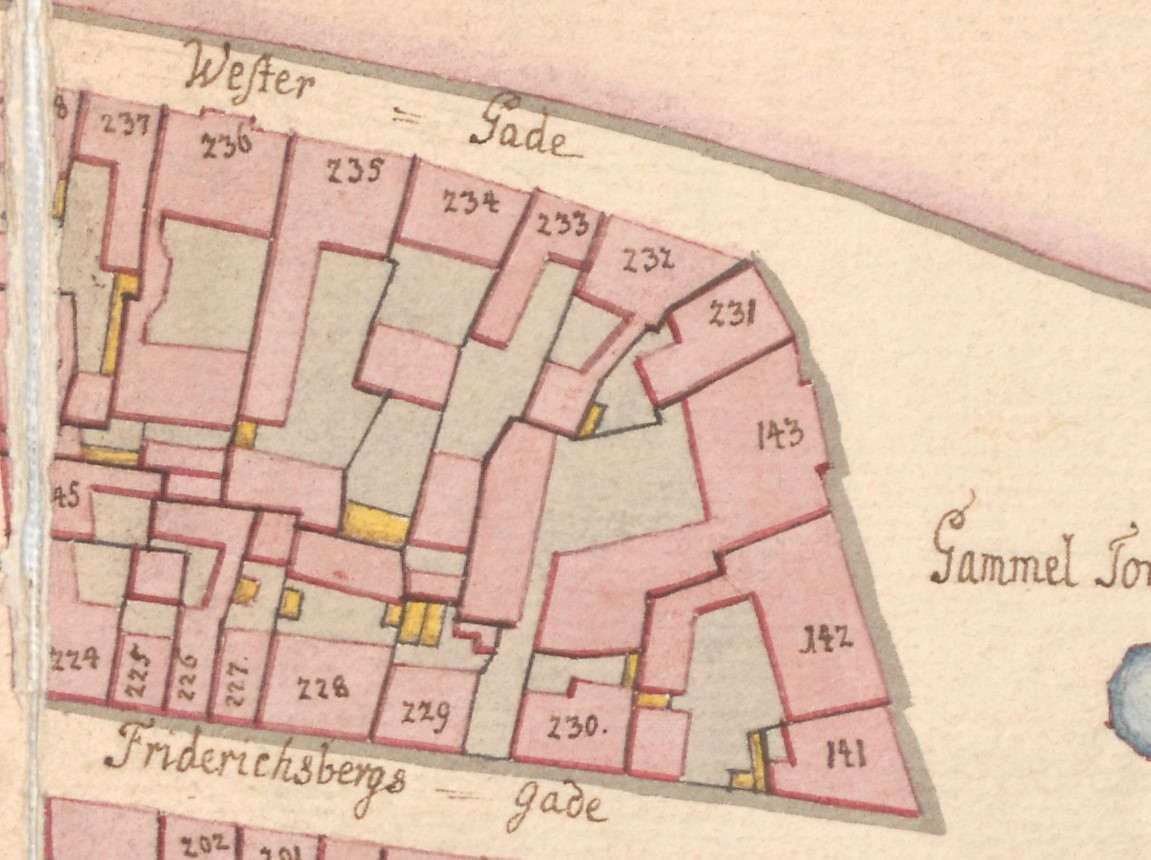
No. No. 232 and No. 233 seen on a detail from Christian Gedde's map of Copenhagen's West Quarter, 1757.

The previous building on the site was built after the Copenhagen Fire of 1728. In the new cadastre of 1756, it was listed as No. 233 in the city's West Quarter (Vester Kvarter). The owner at that time was baker Jochum Diderichsen Greve.

At the time of the 1787 census, No. 233 was home to two households. Samuel Hey, a baker, resided in the building with his wife Sophia Halling, their sic-year-old daughter Anna Maria, three bakers, a caretaker and two maids. Iwer Helt, a businessman (Cabus Mager), resided in the building with his wife Catrine Helt and two children (aged 1 and 11).

=== Peder Gielstrup and the new building ===
The buildings on the site was again destroyed in the Copenhagen Fire of 1795. No. 233 was subsequently merged with a section of No. 232 (No. 232 B). The present building on the site was constructed for grocer (jørkræmmer) Peder Gielstrup in 1795–1796.

At the time of the 1801 census, Peder Gielstrup's property was home to four households. The owner resided in one of the apartments with his Ane Marie Andersen, their four children (aged nine to 16), two employees in his grocery business /one of them an apprentice), a female cook and a maid. Christen Helwadum, a secretary, resided in the building with his wife Margrethe Lange and one maid. Andreas Runge, a supercargo, resided in the building with a female cook. Johan Christian Fræk, an ironmonger (isenkræmmer), resided in the building with his wife Ane Cathrine Runge, their sevn-year-old Andres Christian Fræk, a housekeeper, a female cook and amaid.

In the new cadastre of 1806, the property was listed as No. 40 in Western Quarter. It was at that time still owned by Gielstrup. The clergy Christian Bastholm (1740-1819) was a resident of the building in 1813.

=== 1820–1900 ===
The painters Albert Küchler (1803-1886) and Jørgen Roed (1808-1888) were both among the residents in 1830.

At the time of the 1840 census, No, 40 was home to four households. Christen F. E. Bache, a customs officer, resided on the ground floor with his two sons (aged 16 and 22), the theology student Thøger Flensburg and one maid. H. G. Bentsen, a member (deputeret) in Danish Chancery, resided on the first floor with his brother Thor Bentsen, his sister J. P. Bentsen and one maid. Mathias Jacob Lassen, a justitsråd, resided on the second floor with the widow N. H. Ginslaug and one maid. Niels Olsen, a second hand-dealer, resided in the basement with his wife Bertha Maria, their four children (aged 13 to 25), a male servant and a maid.

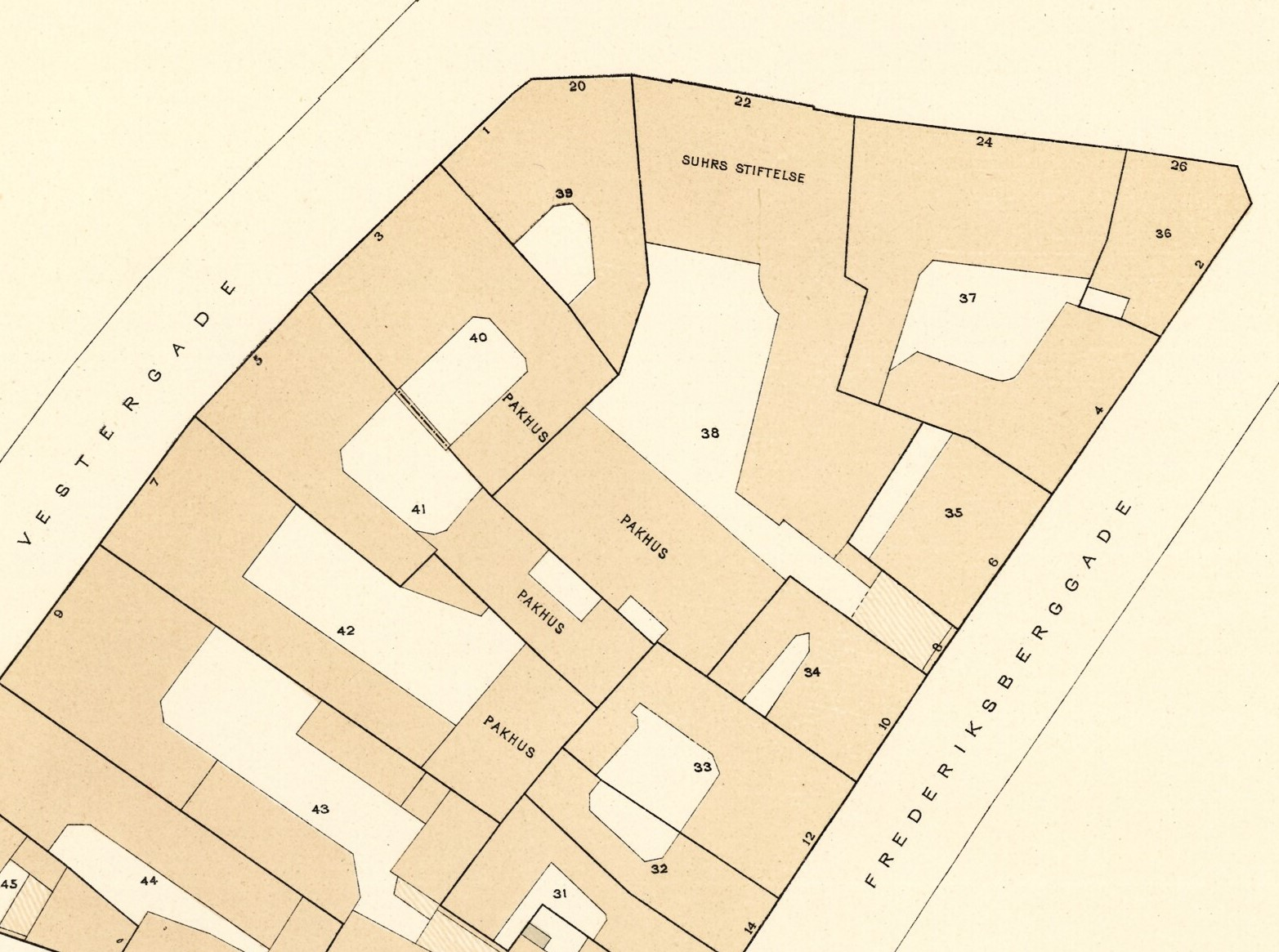
Vesterhade 3 seen on a detail from one of Berggreen's block plans of Western Quarter, 1886-88.

The property was home to 27 residents at the 1850 census. Julius Christian Jørgensen, a lawyer, resided on the second floor with his wife Sophie Lovise Jørgensen, their four children (aged three to 14) and one maid. Marthias Jacob Larsen, a retired justitsråd, resided on the same floor. Esaias I Israel, a 78-year-old man with means, resided on the first floor with his wife Lovise Israel, their widowed daughter Sophie Hertz (née Israel), her two children (aged 13 and 14), one male servant and one maid. Jens Andreas Aagaard, a government official with title of kancelliråd, resided on the ground floor with his wife Frederikke Elisabeth Nicoline Mouritzenm their two daughters (aged one and eight) and one maid. Niels Olsen, a junk dealer, resided in the basement with his wife Bertha Maria Olsen, three unkarried children (aged 23 to 36), one male servant and one maid.

At the 1860 census, No. 33 was home to four households. Lauritz Lebrecht Hommel, a schoolmaster, resided in the building with his wife Laurine Christiane Hommel (née Borch), their son Mathias Jacob Larsen(first lieutenant) and a maid. Jens Andreas Andersen, a wine merchant, resided in the building with his wife Caroline Andersen født Iwergius, their three children (aged 15 and 21), a wine merchant (employee), a clerk (employee) and a maid. Peter Georg Toft Birk, a civil servant in the Ministry of Interior Affairs, resided in the building with his wife Adolphine Helene Caroline Hansen, their three children (aged one to three) and two maids. Ole Olsen, a man with unknown profession, resided in the building with his wife Margrethe Olsen, their two children (aged one and four) and two maids.

=== 20th century ===
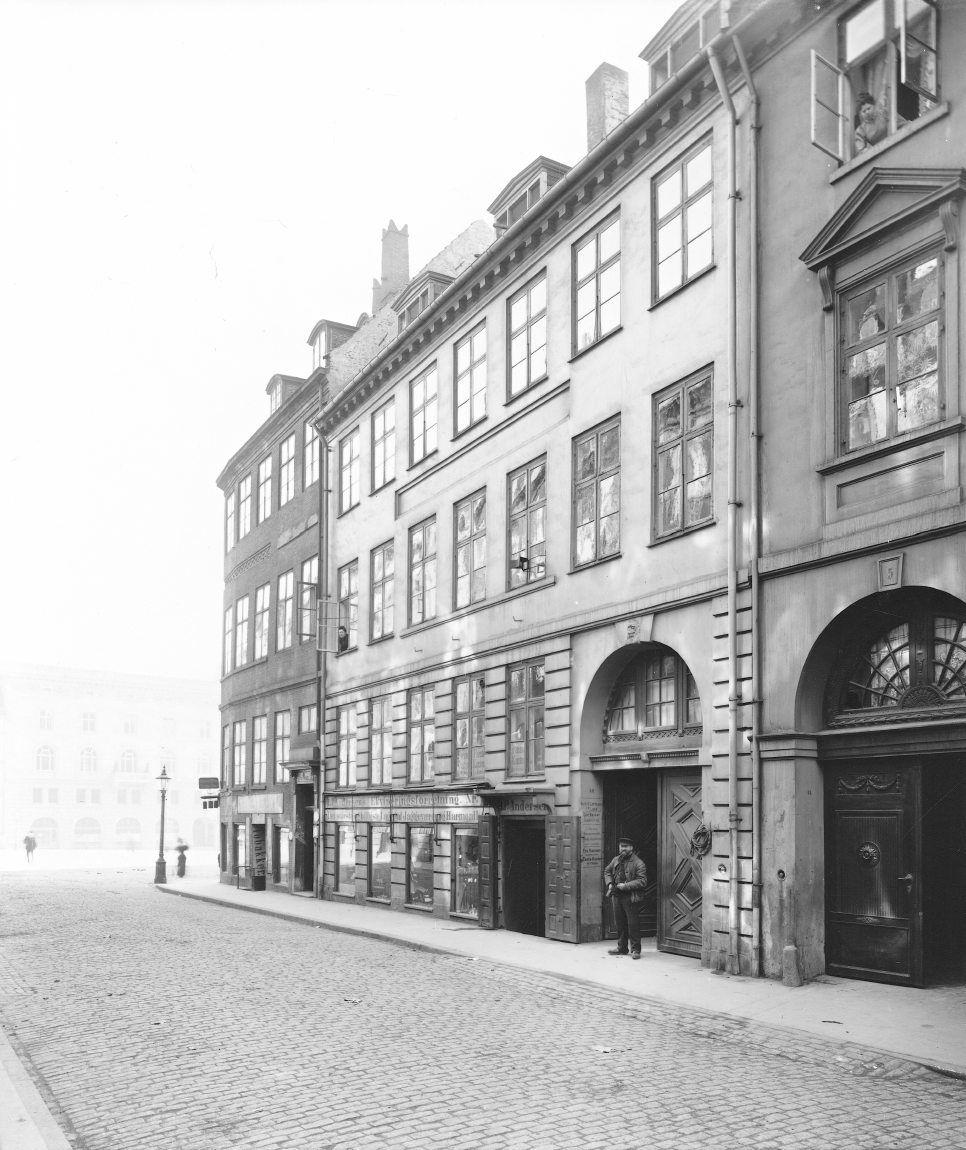
Vestergade 3 photographed by Peter Elfelt in 1900.

The violin builder Pauli Merling's workshop was from 1929 and until his death in 1976 based in the basement and ground floor. The premises were in the 1990s converted into a restaurant.

== Architecture ==
The building is seven bays wide. The keystone above the gate dates from the previous building at the site. It features a lion head and the inscription “1728 DEN 20 OCTOBER AFBRANDT“. (1728 - 28 October burned".

A side wing extends from the rear side of the building and connects to a former warehouse at the bottom of the small courtyard.

== Today ==
House of Souls, a cajun restaurant, is based on the lower floors.

== Gallery ==
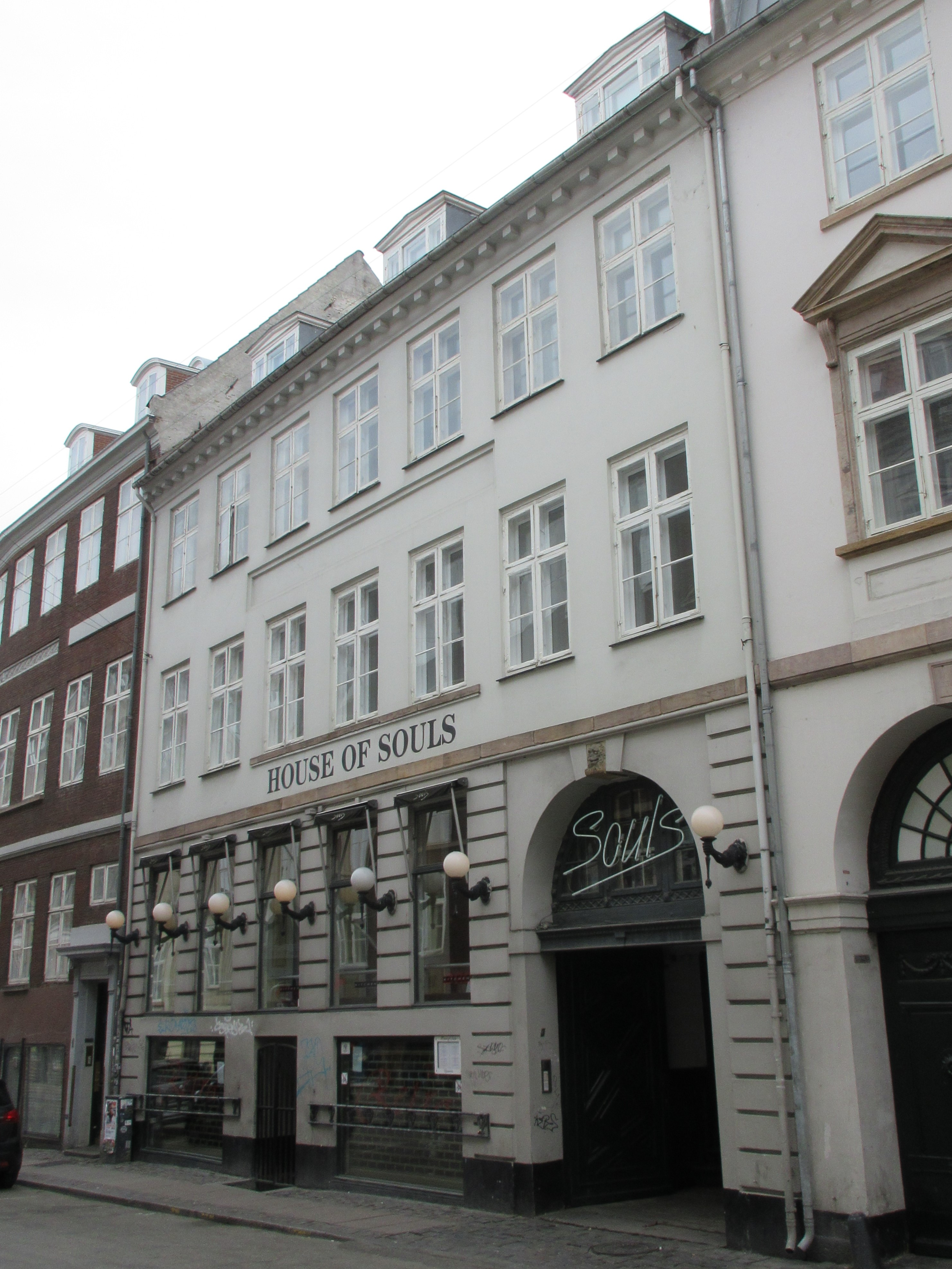

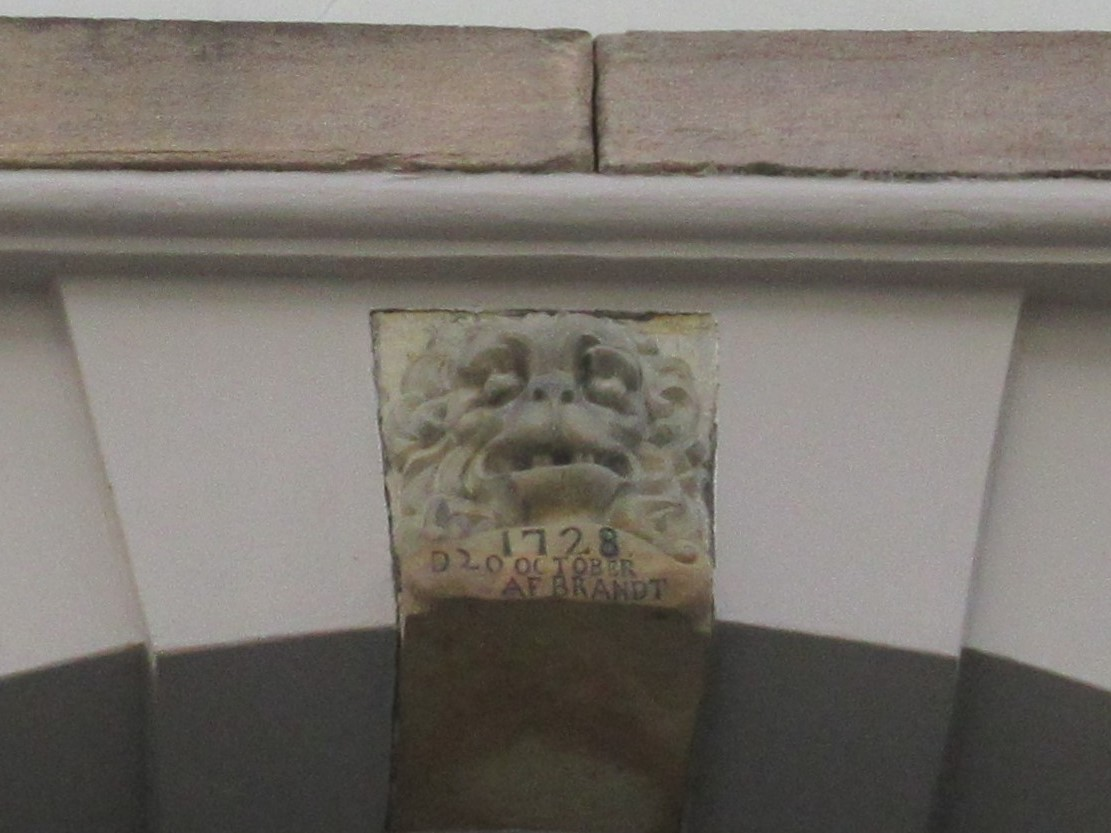
The keystone

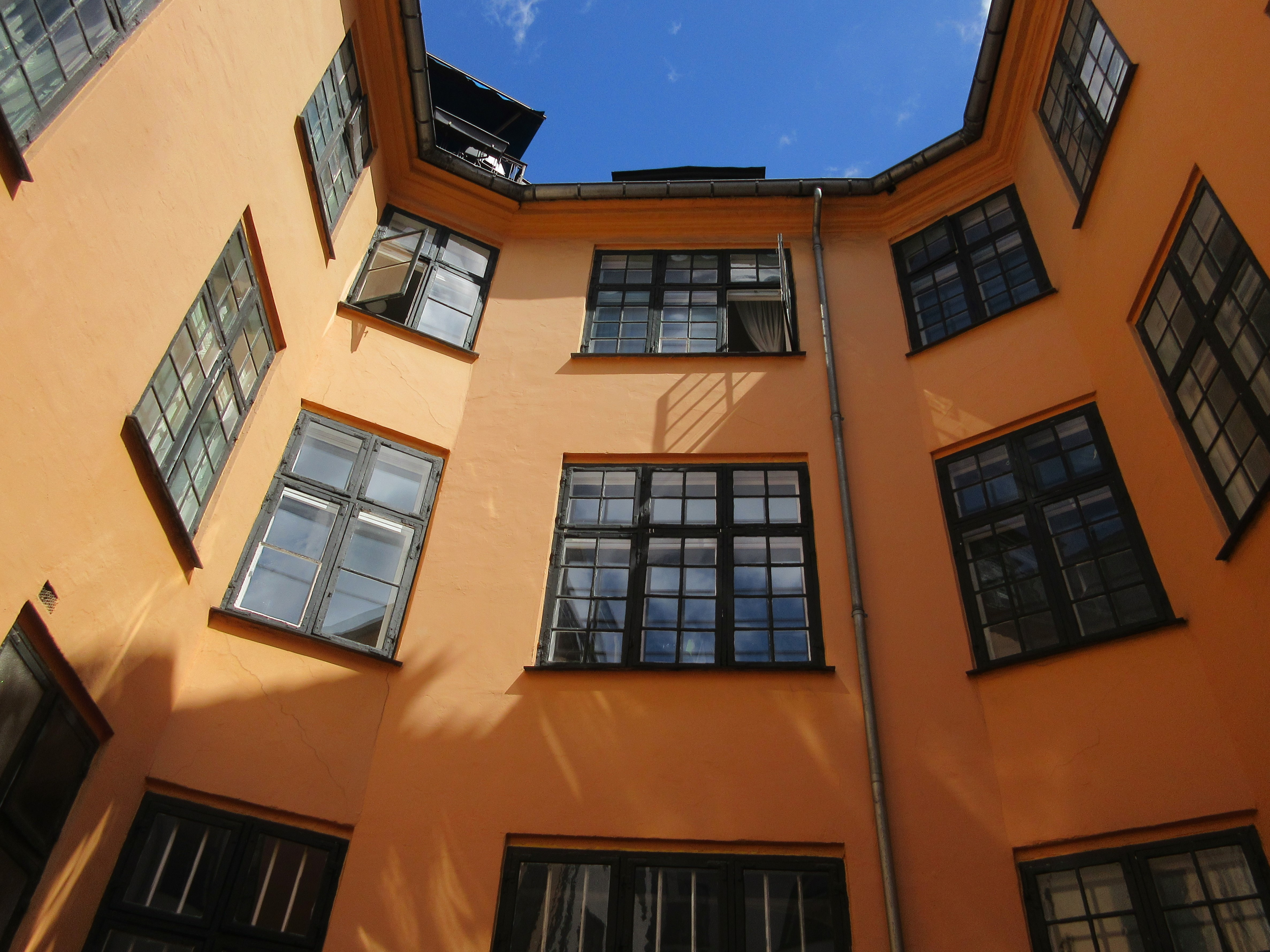
The side wing

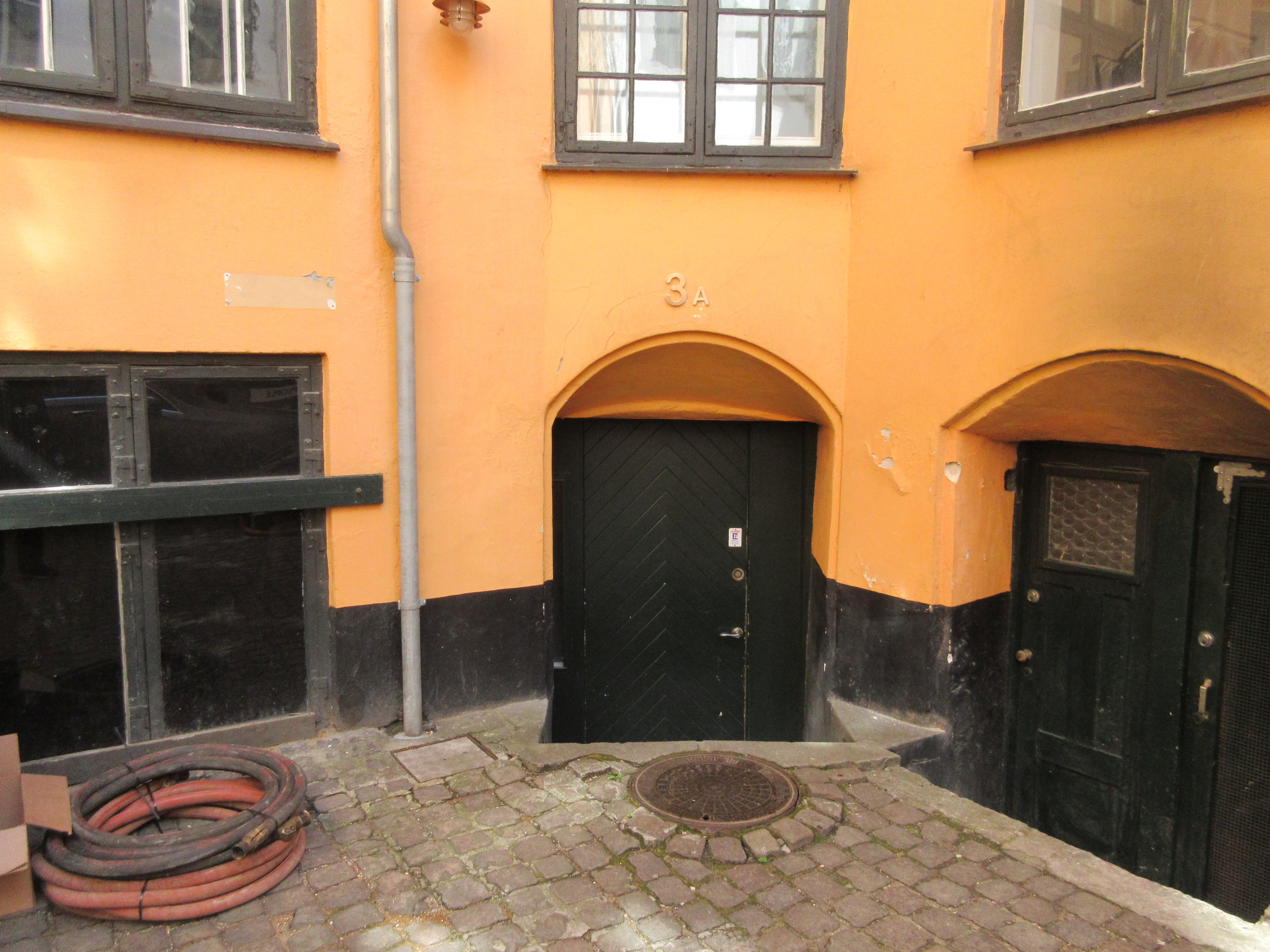
No. 3A

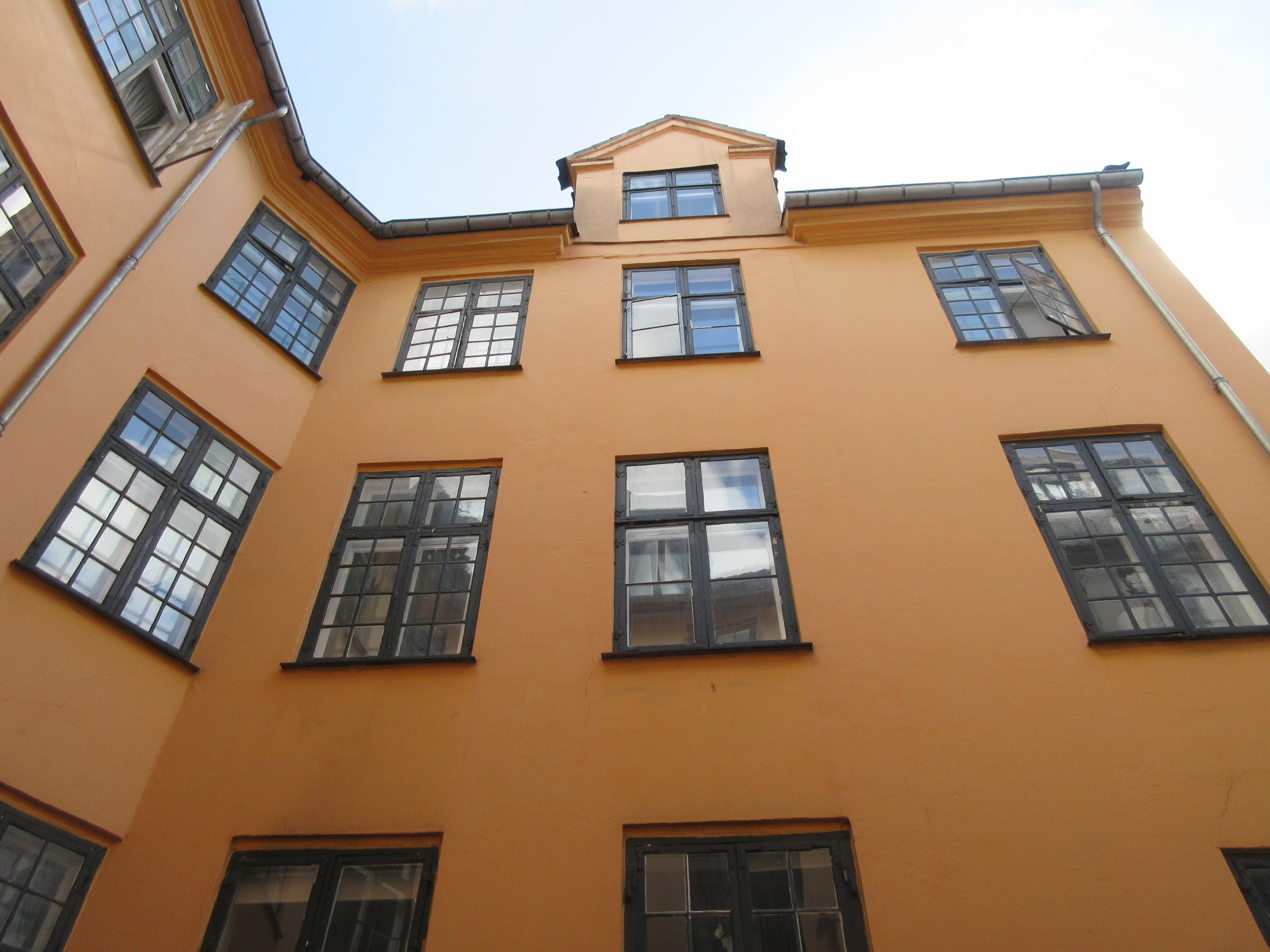
The rear wing

== See also ==
- Vestergade 5
