= List of Academy Award winners and nominees from Denmark =

This article is a list of Danish individuals working in the cinema industry who have been nominated for or have won an Academy Award. It includes artists and filmmakers of Danish nationality, as well as those with dual citizenship that have been awarded or honored by the Academy.

== Performance ==
=== Best Actor in a Leading Role ===
Actor
Year	Name	Film	Status	Milestone / Notes
2007	Viggo Mortensen	Eastern Promises	Nominated	
2016	Viggo Mortensen	Captain Fantastic	Nominated	
2018	Viggo Mortensen	Green Book	Nominated	

=== Best Actress in a Leading Role ===
Actress
Year	Name	Film	Status	Milestone / Notes
2019	Scarlett Johansson	Marriage Story	Nominated	

=== Best Actress in a Supporting Role ===
Supporting Actress
Year	Name	Film	Status	Milestone / Notes
2019	Scarlett Johansson	Jojo Rabbit	Nominated	

== Production ==
=== Best Picture ===
Best Picture
Year	Name	Film	Status	Milestone / Notes
2025	Lars Knudsen	Bugonia	Nominated	Shared with Ed Guiney, Andrew Lowe, Yorgos Lanthimos, and Emma Stone. The film was submitted by Norway.

=== Best Animated Feature ===
Animated Feature
Year	Name	Film	Status	Milestone / Notes
2021	Jonas Poher Rasmussen; Monica Hellström; Signe Byrge Sørensen	Flee	Nominated	Shared with Charlotte de la Gournerie.

=== Best Live Action Short Film ===
Live Action Short
Year	Film	Director and Producer	Status	Milestone / Notes
1996	Ernst & Lyset	Anders Thomas Jensen; Kim Magnusson	Nominated	
1997	Wolfgang	Anders Thomas Jensen; Kim Magnusson	Nominated	
1998	Election Night	Anders Thomas Jensen; Kim Magnusson	Won	
2002	Der Er En Yndig Mand	Martin Strange-Hansen; Mie Andreasen	Won	
2006	Helmer & Son	Søren Pilmark; Kim Magnusson	Nominated	
2007	At Night	Christian E. Christiansen; Louise Vesth	Nominated	
2008	The Pig	Tivi Magnusson; Dorte Høgh	Nominated	
2009	The New Tenants	Joachim Back; Tivi Magnusson	Won	
2013	Helium	Anders Walter; Kim Magnusson	Won	
2016	Silent Nights	Aske Bang; Kim Magnusson	Nominated	
2021	On My Mind	Martin Strange-Hansen; Kim Magnusson	Nominated	
2022	Ivalu	Anders Walter; Rebecca Pruzan	Nominated	
2023	Knight of Fortune	Lasse Lyskjær Noer; Christian Norlyk	Nominated	

=== Best Documentary Feature Film ===
Documentary
Year	Film	Director / Recipient	Status	Milestone / Notes
2009	Burma VJ	Anders Østergaard and Lise Lense-Møller	Nominated	
2013	The Act of Killing	Signe Byrge Sørensen	Nominated	Shared with Joshua Oppenheimer.
2015	The Look of Silence	Signe Byrge Sørensen	Nominated	Shared with Joshua Oppenheimer.
2017	Last Men in Aleppo	Søren Steen Jespersen	Nominated	Shared with Feras Fayyad and Kareem Abeed.
2019	The Cave	Kirstine Barfod and Sigrid Dyekjær	Nominated	Shared with Feras Fayyad.
2021	Flee	Jonas Poher Rasmussen, Monica Hellström, and Signe Byrge Sørensen	Nominated	Shared with Charlotte De La Gournerie.
2022	A House Made of Splinters	Monica Hellström, Simon Lereng Vilmont	Nominated	

=== Best Documentary Short Film ===
Documentary (Short Subject)
Year	Film	Director / Recipient	Status	Milestone / Notes
1960	A City Called Copenhagen	Statens Filmcentral and The Danish Government Film Office	Nominated	

=== Best International Feature Film ===
International Feature Film
Year	Film	Director	Status	Milestone / Notes
1956	Qivitoq	Erik Balling	Nominated	
1959	Paw	Astrid Henning-Jensen	Nominated	
1961	Harry and the Butler	Bent Christensen	Nominated	
1987	Babette's Feast	Gabriel Axel	Won	First Danish film to win the Oscar in this category.
1988	Pelle the Conqueror	Bille August	Won	Second Danish film to win the Oscar in this category.
1989	Waltzing Regitze	Kaspar Rostrup	Nominated	
2006	After the Wedding	Susanne Bier	Nominated	
2010	In a Better World	Susanne Bier	Won	Third Danish film to win the Oscar in this category.
2012	A Royal Affair	Nikolaj Arcel	Nominated	
2013	The Hunt	Thomas Vinterberg	Nominated	
2015	A War	Tobias Lindholm	Nominated	
2016	Land of Mine	Martin Zandvliet	Nominated	
2020	Another Round	Thomas Vinterberg	Won	Fourth Danish film to win the Oscar in this category.
2021	Flee	Jonas Poher Rasmussen	Nominated	
2024	The Girl with the Needle	Magnus von Horn	Nominated	

== Craft ==
=== Best Director ===
Director
Year	Name	Film	Status	Milestone / Notes
2020	Thomas Vinterberg	Another Round (Druk)	Nominated	
2025	Joachim Trier	Sentimental Value	Nominated	

=== Best Cinematography ===
Cinematography
Year	Name	Film	Status	Milestone / Notes
1989	Mikael Salomon	The Abyss	Nominated	
2017	Dan Laustsen	The Shape of Water	Nominated	
2021	Dan Laustsen	Nightmare Alley	Nominated	
2025	Dan Laustsen	Frankenstein	Nominated	

=== Best Production Design ===
Production Design
Year	Name	Film	Status	Milestone / Notes
1931	Max Rée	Cimarron	Won	
1955	Tambi Larsen	The Rose Tattoo	Won	Shared with Hal Pereira, Sam Comer and Arthur Krams.
1963	Tambi Larsen	Hud	Nominated	Shared with Hal Pereira, Sam Comer and Robert R. Benton.
1965	Tambi Larsen	The Spy Who Came in from the Cold	Nominated	Shared with Hal Pereira, Ted Marshall and Josie MacAvin.
1970	Tambi Larsen	The Molly MaGuires	Nominated	Shared with Darrell Silvera.
1981	Tambi Larsen	Heaven's Gate	Nominated	Shared with James L. Berkey.

=== Best Makeup and Hairstyling ===
Makeup and Hairstyling
Year	Name	Film	Status	Milestone / Notes
2025	Thomas Foldberg; Anne Cathrine Sauerberg	The Ugly Stepsister	Nominated	

=== Best Editing ===
Editing
Year	Name	Film	Status	Milestone / Notes
2020	Mikkel E. G. Nielsen	Sound of Metal	Won	
2022	Mikkel E. G. Nielsen	The Banshees of Inisherin	Nominated	
2025	Olivier Bugge Coutté	Sentimental Value	Nominated	

=== Best Visual Effects ===
Visual Effects
Year	Name	Film	Status	Milestone / Notes
1991	Mikael Salomon	Backdraft	Nominated	

== Music ==
=== Original Song ===
Original Song
Year	Name	Film	Song	Status	Milestone / Notes
2000	Lars von Trier	Dancer in the Dark	"I've Seen It All"	Nominated	

== See also ==
- List of Danish submissions for the Academy Award for Best Foreign Language Film
- Cinema of Denmark
- List of Asian Academy Award winners and nominees
