= List of Danish films =

This is an incomplete list of films produced in Denmark in year order. For an alphabetical list of films currently on Wikipedia see Category:Danish films.

== List of films by decade ==
- List of Danish films before 1910
- List of Danish films of the 1910s
- List of Danish films of the 1920s
- List of Danish films of the 1930s
- List of Danish films of the 1940s
- List of Danish films of the 1950s
- List of Danish films of the 1960s
- List of Danish films of the 1970s
- List of Danish films of the 1980s
- List of Danish films of the 1990s
- List of Danish films of the 2000s
- List of Danish films of the 2010s
- List of Danish films of the 2020s

== See also ==
- Cinema of Denmark
- List of Danish film directors
