= Jens Levin Tvede =

Danish destiller and politician (1830–1891)

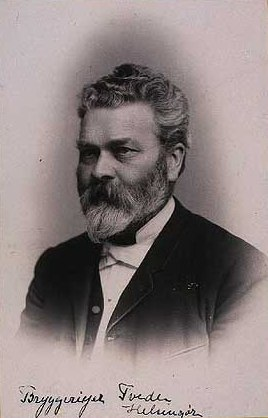
- Tvede photographed by Albert Schou
- Born: 7 April 1830; Copenhagen, Denmark
- Died: 11 March 1891 (aged 60); Helsingør, Denmark
- Occupations: Businessman and politician
- Awards: Knight of the Dannebrog

Jens Levin Tvede (7 April 1830 - 11 March 1891) was a Danish distiller, industrialist and politician. He was the brother of Hans Jørgen Tvede and the father of Charles Tvede.

== Early life and education ==
Tvede was born on 7 April 1830 in Copenhagen, the son of Jørgen Martin Hansen Tvede (1790-1849) and Cathrine Elene Dorthea Drewes (1791-1854). Tvede's father moved his distillery from Copenhagen to Helsingør in 1842. Tvede enrolled at the College of Advanced Technology.

== Career ==
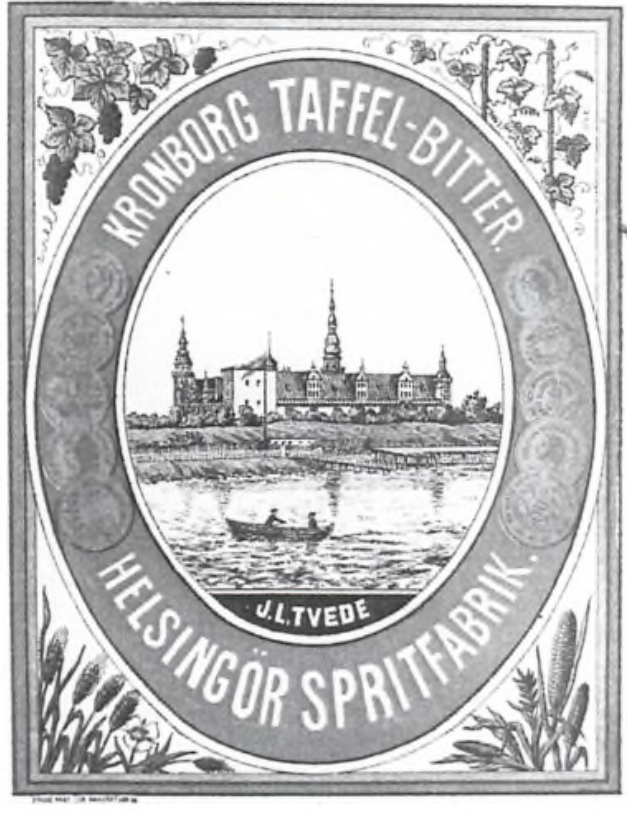
J. L. Tvede label.

Tvede discontinued his studies to run the distillery when his father died in 1849. He initially ran it on behalf of his mother but became its owner in 1854. The distillery was located in the courtyard at Sudergade 23. It was destroyed in a fire in 1864. He then purchased a new site at Stjernegade 25 and constructed a modern, steam-powered distillery. It grew to considerable size. Inn 1877 he also started a production of small beer and a yeast factory followed in 1887.

Tvede converted his firm into a limited company under the name Helsingør Spritfabrik. Tvede's son Charles Tvede was managing director of the company. Tvede was at the time of his death president of the Danish Destillers' Association (Foreningen af Spiritusfabrikanter i Danmark).

== Other commercial activities ==
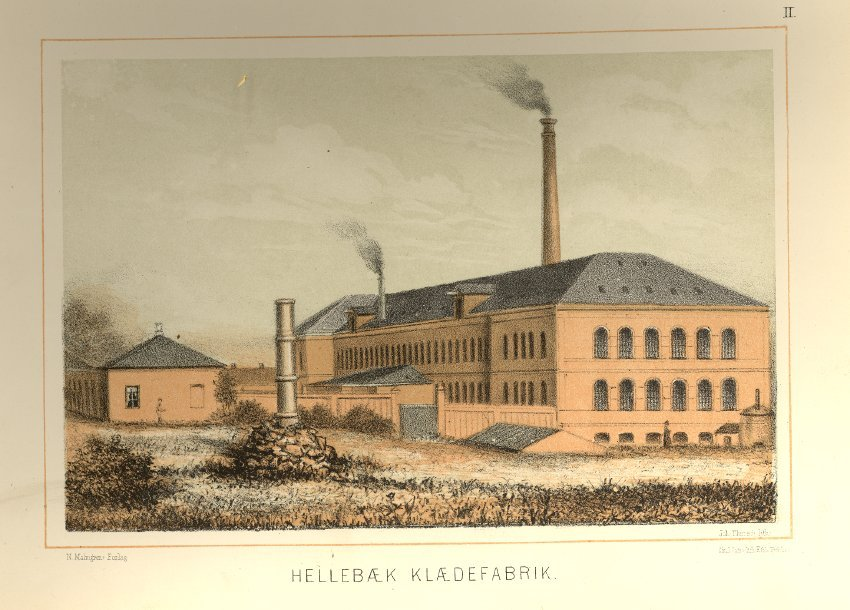
Hellebæk Textile Factory, circa 1888

In the years after the termination of the Sound Dues, Tvede was engaged in a number of initiatives to create new economic activity in the Helsingør. He was a co-founder and the first chairman of Hellebæk Textile Factory in 1873. He was also a co-founder of Helsingør Shipyard in 1881 and of Helsingør Telephone Company in 1883.

== Politics ==
Yvede was a member of Helsingør City Council from 1857 and until his death. He started a conservative society in Helsingør in 1885, served as its president and was at a by-election in Roskilde in 1886 elected for Landstinget. He was a captain in Helsingør Civil Artillery(Helsingør Borgerbevæbning).

== Personal life and legacy ==
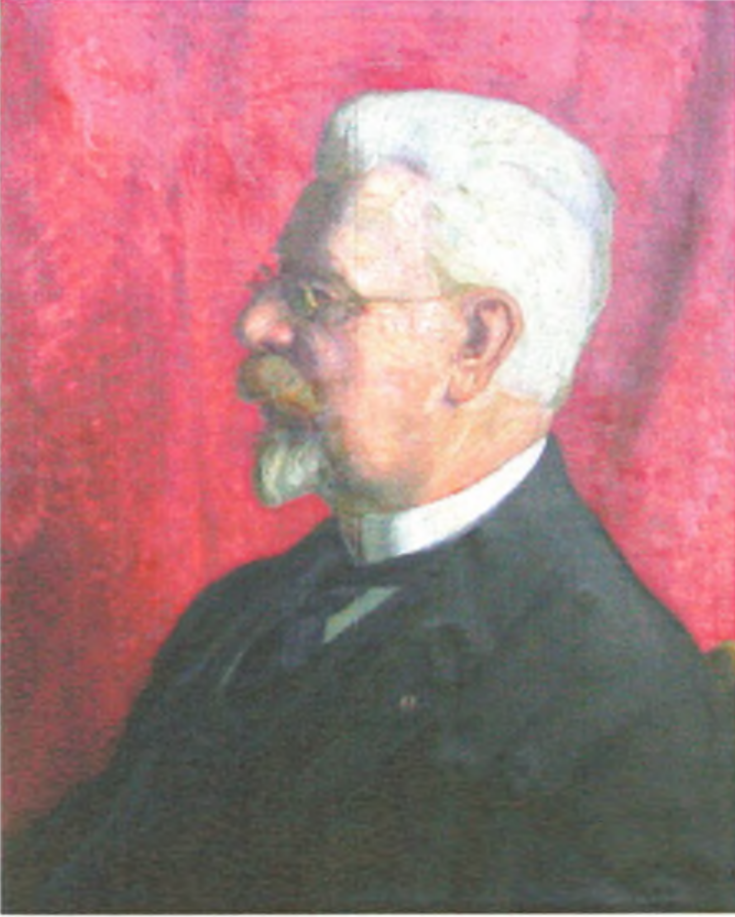
Jens Levin Tvede.

Tvede married Emilie Christiane Henriette Sophie Bjerg (Bierg) (25 July 1833 - 1 March 1928), a daughter of station master Fritz Andreas Bjerg (1795-1870) and Sophie Gedde (1807–80), on 14 May 1859 in Helsingør.

He became a Knight in the Order of the Dannebrog in 1884. He died on 11 March 1891 and is buried in Helsingør Cemetery.

Tvede's distillery occupied a large site bounded by Stjernegade, Fiolgade and Trækbanen (from 1898 named I.L. Tvedes Vej after him).
