= List of Danish film directors =

This is a list of Danish film directors. It includes some foreign-born film directors who have worked in Denmark.

== A ==
- Milad Alami
- Lin Alluna
- Asbjørn Andersen
- Nikolaj Arcel
- Morten Arnfred
- Natasha Arthy
- Bille August
- Gabriel Axel

== B ==
- Erik Balling
- Poul Bang
- Aske Bang
- Susanne Bier
- Jens Bjerre
- August Blom
- Christoffer Boe
- Christian Holten Bonke

== C ==
- Henning Carlsen
- Benjamin Christensen
- Pernille Fischer Christensen
- Erik Clausen

== D ==
- Carl Theodor Dreyer

== E ==
- Peter Elfelt
- Jonas Elmer
- Franz Ernst

== F ==
- Per Fly
- Peter Schønau Fog
- Gert Fredholm
- Grete Frische

== G ==
- Emanuel Gregers
- Lene Grønlykke
- Sven Grønlykke
- Peer Guldbrandsen

== H ==
- Rumle Hammerich
- Jannik Hastrup
- Astrid Henning-Jensen
- Bjarne Henning-Jensen
- Finn Henriksen
- Annelise Hovmand
- Allan Hyde

== I ==
- Bodil Ipsen
- Jon Iversen

== J ==
- Johan Jacobsen
- Anders Thomas Jensen
- Tomas Villum Jensen
- Hella Joof

== K ==
- Palle Kjærulff-Schmidt
- Søren Kragh-Jacobsen
- Hans Kristensen

== L ==
- Birger Larsen
- Viggo Larsen
- Lau Lauritzen Sr.
- Lau Lauritzen Jr.
- Jørgen Leth
- Lisbeth Lynghøft

== M ==
- Ole Christian Madsen
- Nils Malmros
- Sven Methling
- Svend Methling
- Ib Mossin
- Flemming Quist Møller

== N ==
- Jesper W. Nielsen

== O ==
- Alice O'Fredericks
- Annette K. Olesen
- Lasse Spang Olsen
- Niels Arden Oplev
- Vladimir Oravsky
- Katrin Ottarsdóttir (Faroe Islands)

== P ==
- John Price

== R ==
- Jonas Poher Rasmussen
- Annelise Reenberg
- Anders Refn
- Nicolas Winding Refn
- Jytte Rex
- Kaspar Rostrup

== S ==
- Åke Sandgren
- Lone Scherfig
- George Schnéevoigt
- Gunnar Sommerfeldt

== T ==
- Knud Leif Thomsen

== V ==
- Knud Vesterskov
- Thomas Vinterberg
- Lars von Trier

== W ==
- Arne Weel

== Sources ==
- The original version of this article was copied from this version of the article da:Danske filminstruktører in the Danish-language Wikipedia.

== See also ==
- Cinema of Denmark
