= Jens Poul Andersen =

Danish inventor (1844–1935)

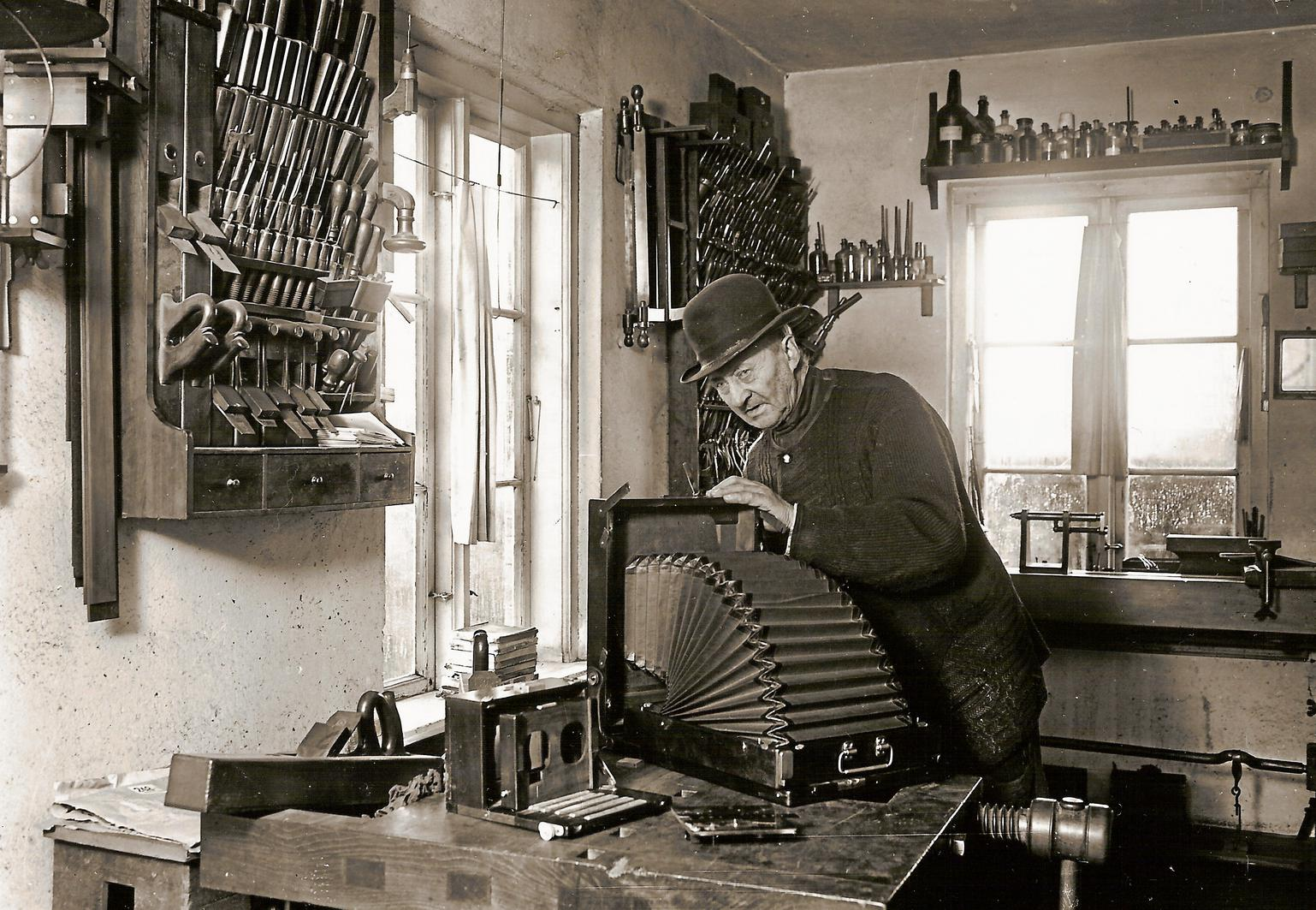
- English: Jens Poul Andersen at work in his workshop at sit værksted Nellerødvej 18, 1904.
- Born: 28 October 1844; Huseby, Annisse Parish, Denmark
- Died: 13 June 1935 (aged 90); Nellerød, Denmark
- Occupations: Inventor, craftsman

Jens Poul Andersen (26 October 1844 – 13 June 1935) was a Danish inventor. He constructed some of the earliest Danish cameras. Peter Elfelt used one of his film cameras for the first Danish film recording in 1897.

== Early life and education ==
Andersen was born on 26 October 1844 in Huseby, Annisse Parish, the son of farmer Anders Pedersen (c. 1817–78) and Ane Sørensdatter (c. 1821–1904). He initially apprenticed as a joiner but the painter P. C. Skovgaard later arranged for him to apprentice as a painter in Frederiksværk. He supplemented his sparse schooling at Classen's School where he was soon noted for his handling of physical devices.

== Career ==
In 1866 Andersen started to work as a joiner and mechanic out of his own workshop in Nellerød. He constructed his first camera in 1866, partly inspired by L.G. Kleffel's Fuldstændig Veiledning i praktisk Fotograf (Danish edition, 1865). His most important technical invention was an improvement of the "collodion wet plate process" which enabled the photographic material to be coated, sensitized, exposed and developed inside the camera. In 1876-77, he was granted a patent of a light camera which eliminated the need for a portable darkroom for use in the field. He entered into a collaboration with photographer Peter L. Petersen (after 1901: Elfelt), who was in 1883 granted an exclusive right to sell Andersen's cameras. Andersen manufactured cameras and other photographic equipment such as stereoscopes as well as microscopes and levels. His creations were represented at the Nordic Exhibition of 1888. He was often neglected or cheated by manufacturers.

He also created a wide range of other products in his workshop, including Binoculars and guitars.

== Legacy ==
One of his finest works was a film camera for Elfelt from 1896–97 which was used for the first film recordings in Denmark. A later, improved camera (the unicum, originally introduced by Bausch and Lomb) from 1904 is now in the collections of the National Museum of Denmark. A camera made for Familie Journalen's Holger Rosenberg (for 160 recordings on an unperforated 35 mm film) is now on display in the Danish Technical Museum in Helsingør.
