= On My Mind (film) =

Short film

- Poster
- Directed by: Martin Strange-Hansen
- Written by: Martin Strange-Hansen
- Produced by: Christian Junget Madsen; Kim Magnusson; Martin Strange-Hansen
- Starring: Rasmus Hammerich; Camilla Bendix; Ole Gorter Boisen; Adam Brix
- Cinematography: Ian Hansen
- Edited by: Thomas Engell
- Music by: Sune Kølster
- Production companies: Benzona Film; M&M Productions
- Distributed by: The New Yorker
- Release date: 10 July 2021 (LA Shorts International Film Festival)
- Running time: 18 minutes
- Country: Denmark
- Language: Danish

On My Mind is a 2021 Danish short film by Martin Strange-Hansen.

== Summary ==
Inspired by the director's experience of losing his daughter, a man at a karaoke machine in a sleepy bar tries to sing the country western pop standard "Always on My Mind" for his wife.

== Cast ==
- Rasmus Hammerich as Henrik
- Camilla Bendix as Louise
- Ole Gorter Boisen as Preben
- Adam Brix as Doctor
- Anne-Marie Bjerre Koch as Nurse
- Sissel Bergfjord as Trine

== Accolades ==
Best Live Action Short Film nomination - 94th Academy Awards
