= Helsingør Cemetery =

Cemetery in Denmark

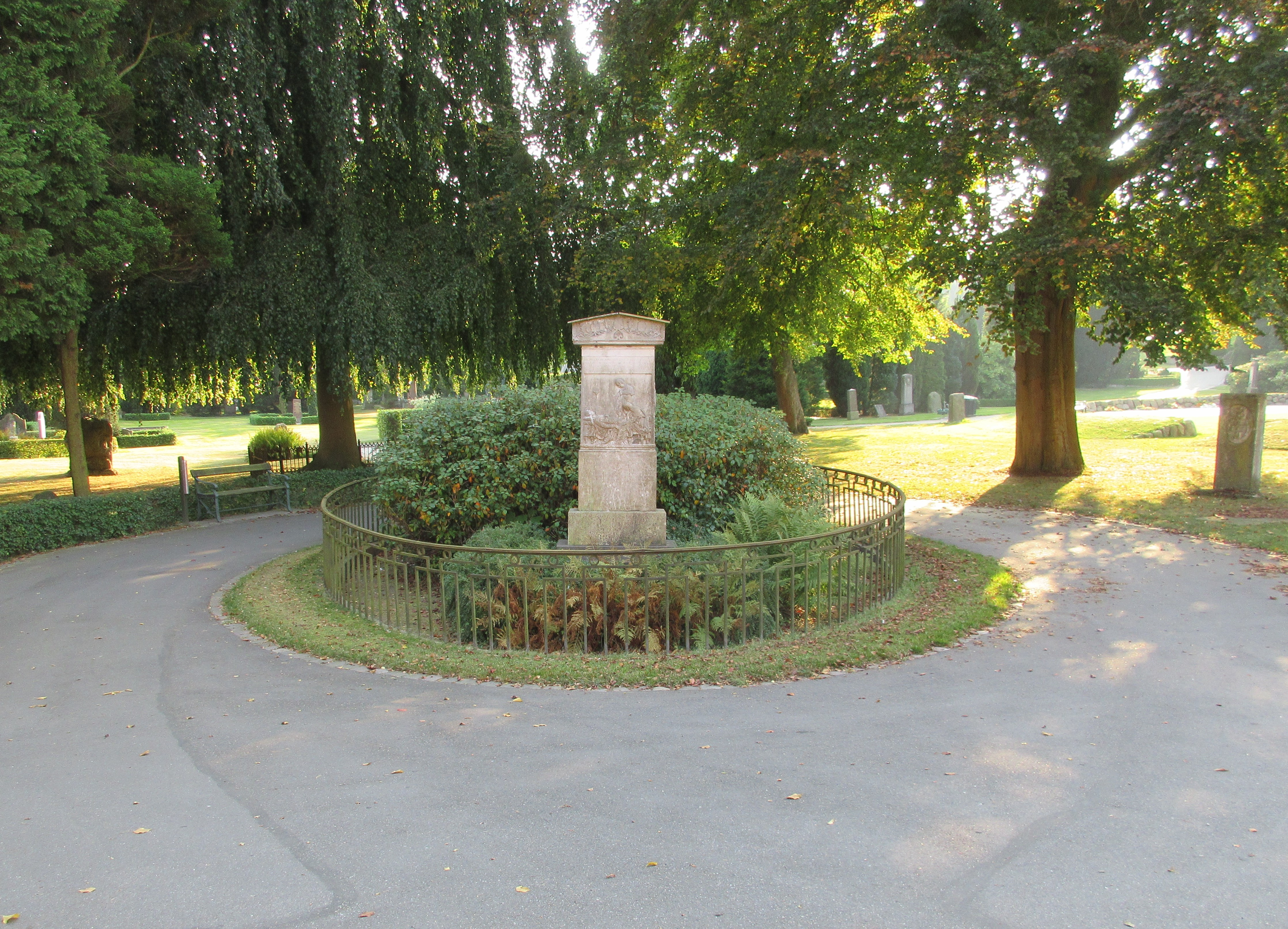
- Interactive map of Helsingør Cemetery

Details
- Established: 1575
- Location: Helsingør
- Country: Denmark
- Coordinates: 56°02′11″N 12°36′18″E
- Type: Municipal
- Size: 7 ha (17 acres)
- No. of graves: c. 10,000
- Website: Official website
- Find a Grave: Helsingør Cemetery

Helsingør Cemetery (Danish: Helsingør Kirkegård) is a cemetery in Helsingør, Denmark. It serves the parishes of St. Olai, St. Mary, Vestervang and Sthen. Founded in the second half of the 16th century, it was originally used as a burial ground for the poor but became the city principal cemetery in the 1820.

It is bordered by Nygade, I.L. Tvedes Vej and Møllebakken.

== History ==
In the Middle Ages, wealthy citizens were usually buried inside St. Olai's or St. Mary's churches or as close to the outer church walls as possible. When Frederick II began the construction of Kronborg, it led to a boom in the population. In 1575, a total of 435 people were buried in the city. Neither of the two existing graveyards could be expanded and the need for a new cemetery was therefore evident. It was established in an area of former common land known as "the plain" in 1580–1582. The new cemetery was for more than 200 years only used by the poorest part of the population. It was a chaotic and filthy place with a bad reputation for attracting dubious characters as well as grazing cows.

In the 17th century, Helsingør had 3,000 to 4,000 inhabitants. During the plague outbreak in 1619, the number of dead reached 900 as opposed to 100 to 300 in normal years. In 1654, the number of dead reached 2,168. The last outbreak of plague in Helsingør in 1700 resulted in 1,809 deaths out of a population of approximately 5,000.

In the 1790s, it was decided to refurbish the cemetery. A new fence was built but the reforms made slow progress. In 1802, the cemetery was divided into two sections, one for each parish (St. Olai and St. Mary).

The last indoor burial in St. Olai's Church took place in 1805. One of the Helsingør's wealthiest citizens, Jean Jacob Classen, was buried in the New Cemetery in 1806. This contributed to making use of the cemetery socially acceptable among members of the middle class. In 1820, it was first considered to close the graveyards at St. Olay's and St. Mary's churches and it was done in 1827, leaving New Cemetery as the main burial ground of the two parishes. A reform in 1929 introduced numbered burial sites although it took many years to implement. A new wall was also built to design by designed by royal architect Jørgen Hansen Koch. It was 321 ells long and had 20 deep niches in the side facing the cemetery. The most wealthy citizens were buried in front of the wall. Over the course of the 19th century, Helsingør's population grew from 5,000 to 9,000 and the cemetery was expanded in both 1826,1850 and 1886. A new wall was built in connection with an extension of Kongensgade in 1975.

== Notable burials ==
- Knud Agger
- Anna Larssen Bjørner
- Povl Christensen
- Otto Jespersen
- Frank Jæger
- Kristian Kongstad
- August Ferdinand Michael van Mehren
- Ole Olufsen
