= Hellebæk Textile Factory =

Former Danish textile factory

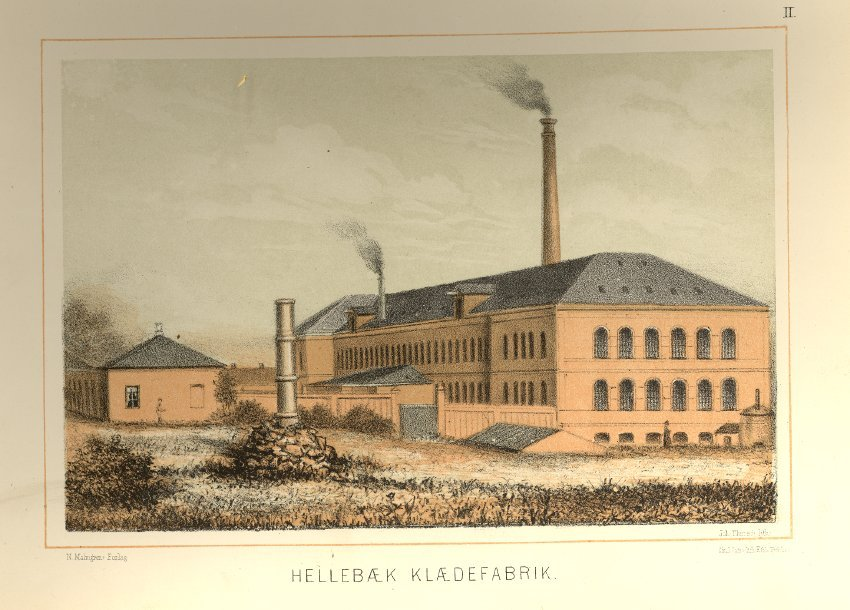
Hellebæk Textile Factory, circa 1888

Hellebæk Textile Factory (Danish: Hellebæk Klædefabrik) is a former textile factory in Hellebæk, Helsingør, Denmark. The building at Nordre Strandvej 119 was removed in the 2000s and are now let out as serviced offices.

== History ==
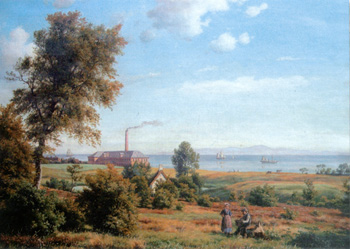
Hellebæk Textile Factory painted by Carsten Henrichsen in 1874

Kronborg Rifle Factory closed in 1870. Its premises were sold to J.W. Saxtorph of Rungstedgaard. He sold it to a consortium in 1873. One of the members of the consortium was destiller Jens Levin Tvede. The consortium founded Hellebæk Textile Factory on 12 April 1873 under the name Hellebæk Klæde- og Tæppefabrik. It was expanded with a cotton mill at Bondedammen in 1877. The factory closed in 1977.

== Legacy ==
The buildings were renovated by Nordea in 2005 and are now used as serviced offices.
