= Anna Larssen Bjørner =

Danish actress and minister (1875–1955)

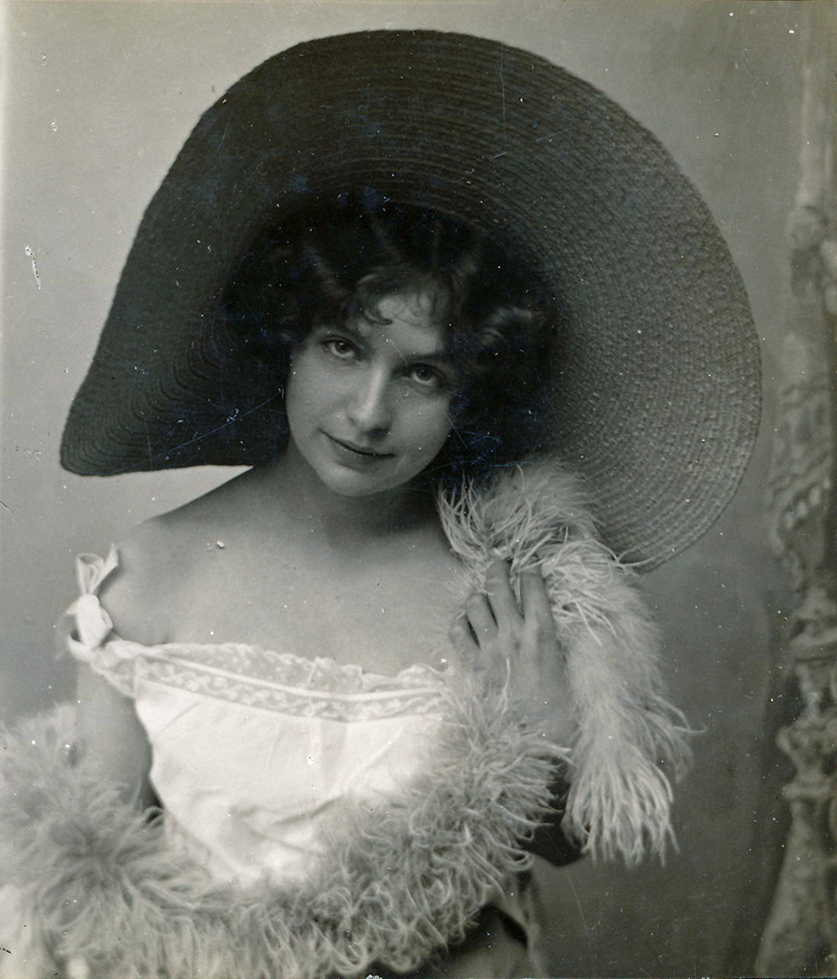
Anna Larssen

Anna Vilhelmine Johanne Dorthea Larssen Bjørner née Halberg (1875–1955) was a Danish actress and Pentecostal preacher. She was born in to a theatrical family and began appearing in plays at the age of six. However her father died and her mother had to give away three of her children to survive. She was seen as a talented actress when she appeared aged sixteen in Musset's Man skal nik spøge med Kærlighenden.

From 1885 to 1909 she gained popularity, performing on the stages of Copenhagen's Dagmarteatret and Folketeatret. In 1909, at the height of her success and under the influence of Thomas Ball Barratt of the Pentecostal movement, she canceled her contract with the theatre and went on to devote the rest of her life to evangelism. Together with her second husband, Sigurd Bjørner, she preached in Denmark and abroad.

In 1919 she and her husband founded an evangelical meeting place which in 1924 joined the Apostolic Church in Wales, England and Scotland.

== Early life and family ==
Born in the Frederiksberg district of Copenhagen on 12 September 1875, Anna Vilhelmine Johanne Dorthea Halberg was the daughter of the actor Johan Laurids Monigatti Halberg (1837–1888) and his Norwegian wife Gina née Hellevig (1851–1929). She was one of the family's five children. Her theatrical education resulted from gaining stage experience from her father. In August 1894, she married the actor Jens Otto Gyntelberg Larssen (1864–1910) with whom she had one child, Finn, in 1895. The marriage was dissolved in 1898. In July 1912, she married the preacher Sigurd Bjørner (1875–1953).

== Career ==
=== As an actress ===
Anna Halberg gained experience in acting from an early age as her father toured Norway as a travelling theatre director. In March 1852, together with her sisters, she appeared in Henrik Ibsen's A Doll's House in Trondheim, Norway. After her father was engaged at the Dagmar Theatre in Copenhagen, she and her younger sister performed various children's roles.

After her father's death, in April 1892 she debuted with success at the Dagmar Theatre as Rossette in Alfred de Musset's No Trifling with Love. Thanks to her attractive figure, her pretty face and her charm, she rapidly gained popularity. After her marriage to Larssen, in 1895 she was engaged by Folketeatret. Encouraged by her attentive theatre director, Herman Bang, she performed roles as a pleasant young girl such as Kätchen in Heinrich von Kleist's Pigen fra Heilbronn or Mizi in Arthur Schnitzlers' Elskovsleg (Love's Devotee).

=== As a preacher ===
Anna had encountered her first experiences in religion while still young. After her father died in 1888, her mother turned to the church, especially from 1893 when she started to follow the preaching of H.J. Mygind, later a pioneering Pentecostal. Encouraged by her mother, from 1901 Anna Larssen attended some of Mygind's meetings. In December 1908, she was invited to dine with the Methodist minister Thomas Barratt who was promoting the Pentecostal movement in Denmark. In her memoirs, she reported she felt a calling to join the movement herself and after completing performances in the stage play Kameliadamen, she decided to devote her life to preaching. Her decision caused considerable commotion and it was only after she has spent a lengthy period in a psychiatric hospital that she was finally released from her theatrical contract.

In 1910, at a Pentecostal meeting in Copenhagen, she met Sigurd Bjørner, who invited her to preach at Helsingør. According to her own account, while praying with Bjørner, she heard the voice of God telling her "Here is the man I have chosen for you". She married him in July 1912 and went on to assist him as the two of them preached across Denmark, travelling from place to place in a gypsy van. In 1919, they opened Evangeliehuset, a meeting place near Copenhagen's Trianglen. Anna Larssen proved to be an effective leader of Denmark's early Pentecostal movement, preaching not only in Denmark but also in Norway and Sweden. In 1924, the couple attached their Pentecostal developments to the Apostolic Church in Wales, England and Scotland.

In 1935, Larssen Bjørner published her memoirs Teater og Tempel. Livserindringer, giving an account of her life as an actress and her conversion to evangelism.

Anna Larssen Bjørner died in Skodsborg, north of Copenhagen, on 6 March 1955 and was buried in Helsingør Cemetery.
