= Silent Nights (film) =

- Directed by: Aske Bang
- Written by: Aske Bang
- Produced by: Kim Magnusson
- Production company: M&M Productions
- Distributed by: Black Bull Pictures; Fox International Productions
- Release date: February 7, 2017 (US)
- Running time: 30 minutes
- Country: Denmark
- Language: English

Silent Nights is a Danish short film directed by Aske Bang. It was nominated for the Academy Award for Best Live Action Short Film at the 89th Academy Awards in 2017, that he shared with Kim Magnusson.

== Premise ==
A Danish volunteer at a housing shelter falls for an illegal immigrant.

== Cast ==
- Malene Beltoft as Inger
- Prince Yaw Appiah as Kwame

== Awards ==
- Nominated: Academy Award for Best Live Action Short Film - Silent Nights
