= Tobias Kongstad =

Danish cyclist (born 1996)

Personal information
- Full name: Tobias Mørch Kongstad
- Born: 14 September 1996 (age 30) Copenhagen, Denmark
- Height: 1.89 m (6 ft 2 in)
- Weight: 72 kg (159 lb)

Cycling career
- Sport: Cycling
- Current team: Team CO:PLAY–Giant Store
- Disciplines: Road; Gravel
- Role: Rider

Amateur team
- 2023–: Team CO:PLAY–Giant Store

Professional teams
- 2015–2021: Riwal Platform
- 2022: Restaurant Suri–Carl Ras

Tobias Mørch Kongstad (born 14 September 1996) is a Danish professional racing cyclist, who currently rides for Danish club team Team CO:PLAY–Giant Store. In October 2020, he rode in the 2020 Three Days of Bruges–De Panne race in Belgium.

== Major results ==
2014
1st Stage 1 Oberösterreich Juniorenrundfahrt
2017
1st Overall Randers Bike Week

1st Stage 2

2018
1st Overall Post Cup
5th Scandinavian Race Uppsala
2021
10th Fyen Rundt
10th Route Adélie
2022
3rd Arno Wallaard Memorial
2023
UCI Gravel World Series

1st Blaavands Huk
5th Gravel One Fifty

2nd The Traka 360
2024
3rd Unbound Gravel 200
2025
1st The Traka 360
