= Kim Magnusson =

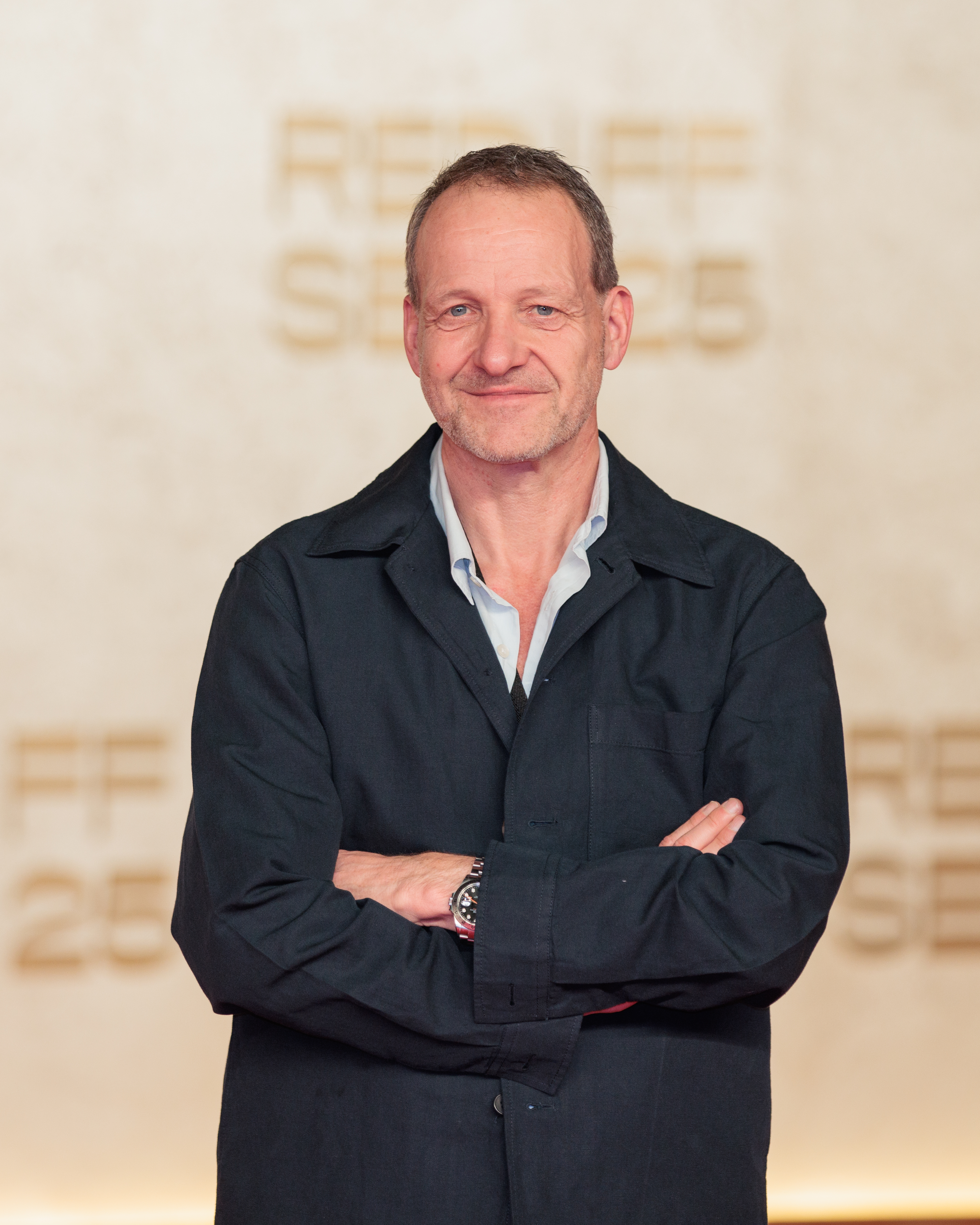
Kim Magnusson 2025

Kim Magnusson is a Danish film producer and actor who has received seven Academy Awards nominations and two awards, all for short films. Magnusson graduated from the AFI Conservatory in 1991 and is credited as a producer in more than 150 films.

He was chairman of the Danish Film Academy for 20 years, as well as the Danish Producers Association for 9 years.

Magnusson's short film Election Night won an Academy Award for Best Live Action Short Film in 1999. His other nominated short films include Helmer & Son, Wolfgang, Ernst & lyset, Silent Nights and On My Mind. He received his fifth Oscar nomination and his second award for the 2013 short film Helium.

Magnusson currently serves as Head of Creative of Scandinavian Film Distribution.

In 2022, Magnusson, among Anna Rezan, Mitchell Block and Zafeiris Haitidis produced the feature documentary My People that premiered to rave reviews in Los Angeles.
