= Dagmar Hansen =

Danish actor, model and singer (1871–1959)

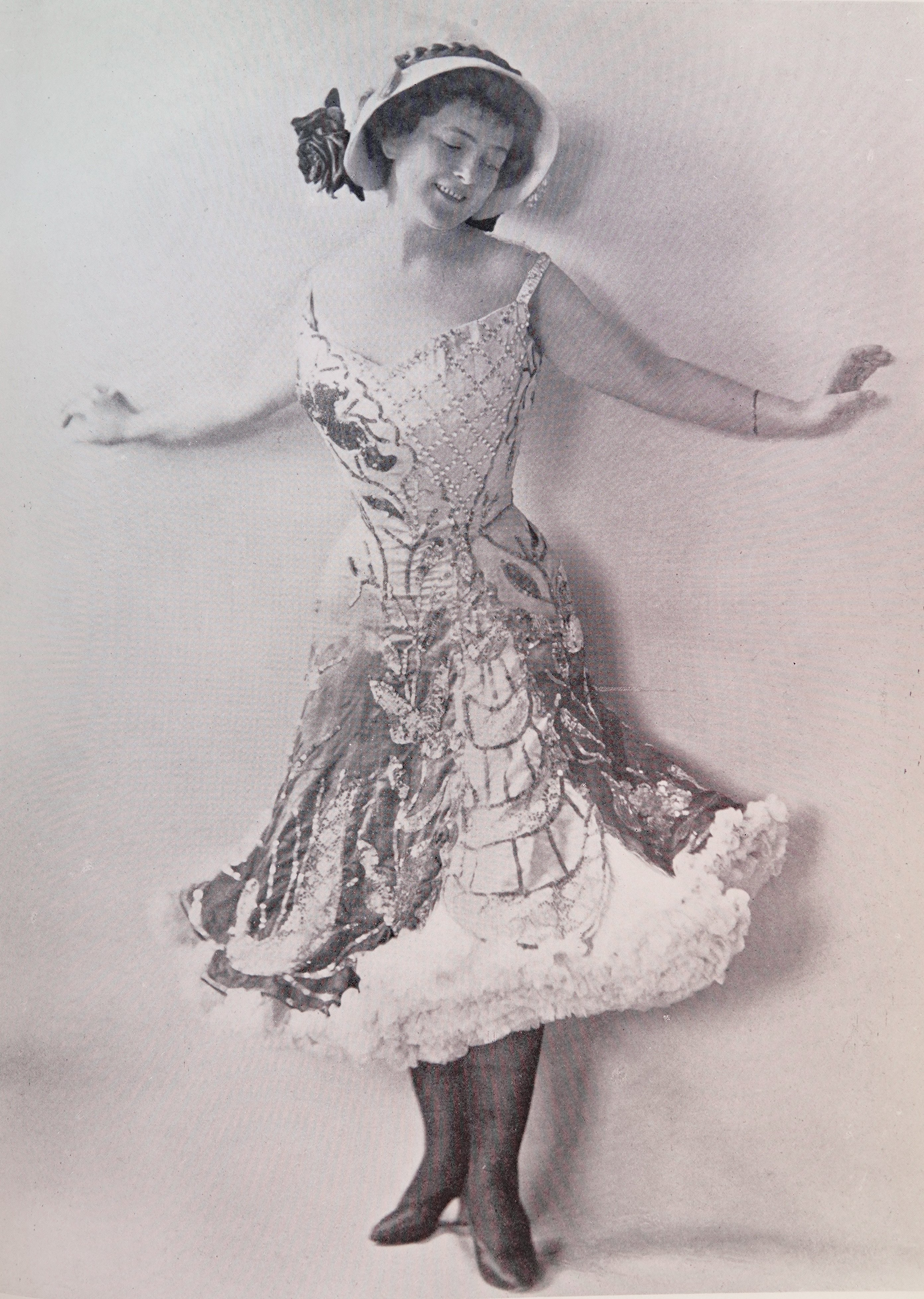
- Dagmar Hansen around 1900
- Born: Dagmar Julie Augusta Hansen; 12 November 1871; Rungsted, Denmark
- Died: 13 April 1959 (aged 87); Rungsted, Denmark
- Resting place: Assistens Cemetery, Copenhagen
- Years active: 1882–1928
- Spouse: Fritz Heinemann

Dagmar Julie Augusta Hansen (12 November 1871 – 13 April 1959), a Danish cabaret-singer and stage-performer, became a national sensation as Denmark's first "pin-up girl".

== Early years ==
Hansen, born 1871 in Rungsted, Denmark, as the daughter of a blacksmith. showed promising stage talent at an early age. Daniel Krum, the Ballet Director of the Royal Danish Theatre asked her (aged 10) to join the company; however, her father refused to allow it. She made her stage debut at the age of 11 in the role of a child general in the fantasy play Tommeliden at the Casino Theater in Copenhagen. She also began singing in the Saint Stefan's Church choir at the age of 13.

Hansen matured physically at an early age as well, and she received her confirmation one year earlier than usual. Her mature physical appearance allowed her to join a theater revue at 14 years of age. Her performances won critical praise in the press for her enjoyable singing voice, charming presence, and well-developed figure. However, when a newspaper interview revealed her age, it caused a scandal, and Hansen moved to Sweden for a year to escape the attention.

== Career ==
In 1890 Hansen worked at the Morskabstheater and in the National Theaters revue. She sang a repertoire specially written for her (including pieces such as Aah, Dagmar and Linger Longer Loo) and performed in small revealing costumes which she sewed herself. The national newspapers praised her erotic performances, and in 1895 the song Oh Dagmar, written by Olfert Jespersen, became a sensation. Hansen became Denmark's first "pin-up girl" when she posed for a series of racy postcards and the photographic albums, Dagmar-Album i 31 Billeder, 1899, and Dagmar-Album i 49 Billeder, 1910. She also posed as a nude model for several Danish artists' masterworks, including Julius Paulsen's 1887 painting, Adam og Eva, and Vilhelm Bissen's sculpture from 1890, En Jægerinde.

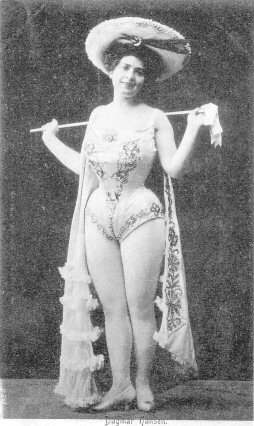
Pin-up photo from 1908

Hansen's performances as an erotic singer brought her into conflict with the public sense of morality. In 1899, she was forbidden from performing in the capital city of Copenhagen. In 1900, when she began to build a villa in the Copenhagen suburb of Hellerup, the neighbors circulated petitions to prevent it. However, she obtained the support of Frederik VIII, King of Denmark, who allowed her to give performances in a revue in Charlottenlund just outside the city. Her success continued, and the transportation to Charlottenlund soon gained the nickname "The Dagmar Train". Hansen also traveled and gave guest performances in Hamburg, Berlin, St. Petersburg, Holland, Hungary and Sweden.

== Marriage and later life ==
In London in 1906, Hansen married a German businessman 14 years her junior, 21-year-old Max Moritz Fritz Heinemann. They lived in Hamburg until the outbreak of World War I, when the German Army drafted Heinemann and sent him to the Western Front. Hansen returned to Denmark and continued her career as an operetta singer. After the war, her husband, ill from mustard gas, moved to Denmark with her.

Hansen's sister died in 1925. Hansen, who never had children of her own, took guardianship of her sister's children and raised them. In 1928 Hansen retired from the stage. Her husband died in 1954 and she moved to a home for the aged in her hometown of Rungsted, where she died in April 1959 at the age of 87. She is buried at Assistens Cemetery in Copenhagen.
