= Vestergade 5 =

Vestergade 5 may refer to:

- Vestergade 5, Copenhagen, a heritage listed building in Copenhagen
- Vestergade 5, Køge, a heritage listed building in Køge
