= Aske Bang =

Danish actor and director

Aske Bang (born April 1, 1988) is a Danish actor and director. He is best known for his work on Silent Nights as director, which earned him critical appraisal and recognition including Academy Award for Best Live Action Short Film at the 89th Academy Awards in 2017.

== Filmography ==
- 2017: 3 Things (post-production)
- 2013: Retrograde (Short) (completed)
- 2016: In the Blood
- 2016: Silent Nights (Short)
- 2015: The Stranger (Short)
- 2015: Anton90 (TV Series)
- 2015: Tomgang (TV Series)
- 2015: Midtimellem
- 2014: Pussy (Short)
- 2014: Familien Jul
- 2013: Antboy
- 2012: Talenttyven
- 2011: Alla Salute! (TV Series) (5 episodes)
- 2011: Ladyboy
- 2011: Borgen (TV Series)
- 2011: Intet kan røre mig (Short)
- 2011: Those Who Kill (TV Series)
- 2011: Alla Salute! (TV Series)
- 2010: To All My Friends (Short)
- 2009-2010: Park Road (TV Series)
- 2008: Little Soldier
- 2008: The Matjulskis (Short)
- 2008: Album (TV Series)

== Awards ==
- Nominated: Academy Award for Best Live Action Short Film - Silent Nights
