= Driving with Greenland Dogs =

- Kørsel med grønlandske hunde
- Directed by: Peter Elfelt
- Starring: Johan Carl Joensen
- Cinematography: Peter Elfelt
- Release date: 1897
- Running time: <1 minutes
- Country: Denmark
- Language: Silent Film

Driving with Greenland Dogs (Danish: Kørsel med grønlandske hunde), is a Danish silent film made in 1897 by the photographer Peter Elfelt. It was the first movie sequence filmed in Denmark. The film, less than one minute in length (10 meters of 35mm film), shows a Danish colony manager named Johan Carl Joensen driving a sledge pulled by Greenlandic sled dogs through Fælledparken in Copenhagen, Denmark. In the short sequence, the dog sled is driven toward the camera across a flat snow-covered landscape, it disappears out of the picture, and then reappears from the other side with the driver chasing behind. Elfelt shot the film using a camera he had constructed from detailed plans that Elfelt obtained from the French inventor, Jules Carpentier.
