= Kristian Kongstad =

Danish printer & illustrator (1867–1929)

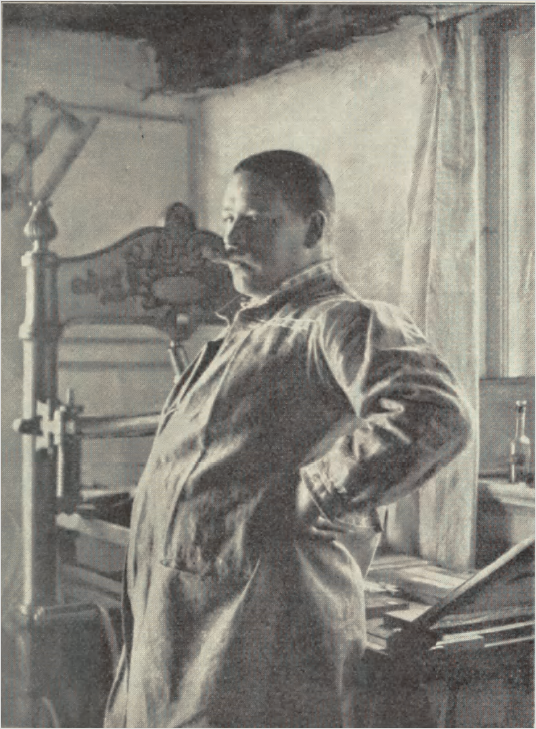
Kristian Kongstad, 1897.

Johan Kristian Kongstad (1867 – 1929) was a Danish printer and illustrator. Among others, he studied under Kristian Zahrtmann. He operated a printing press between 1902 and 1921, and made about 40 titles. He is also credited with designing about 500 book covers.

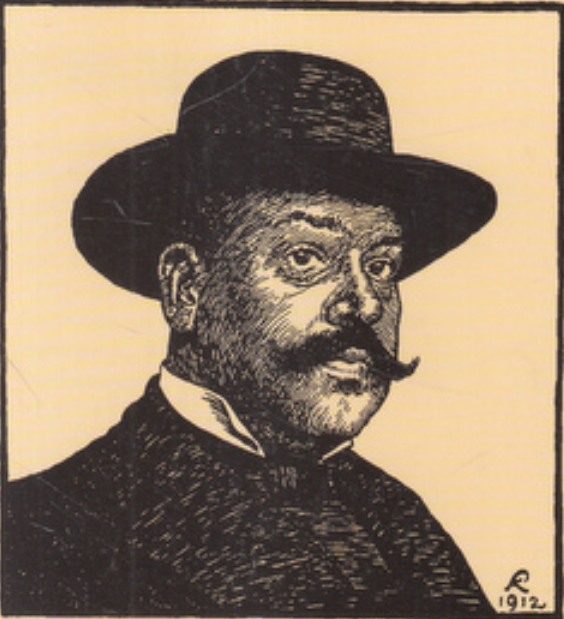
Self portrait, 1912
