= Capital Execution =

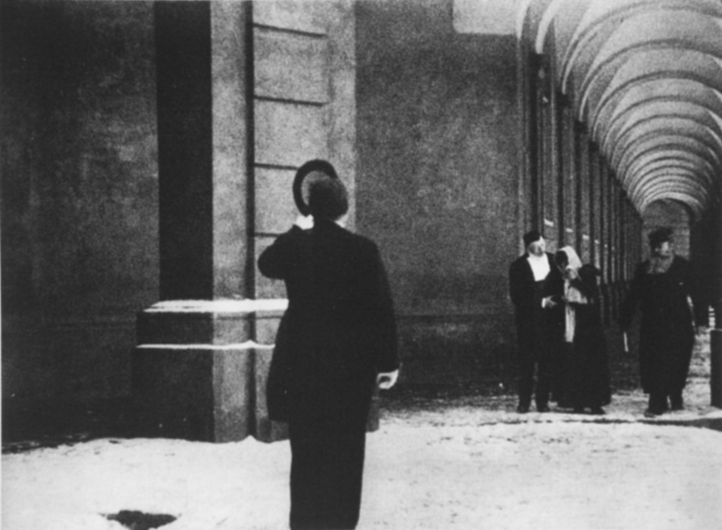
- The child murderess is ushered towards her execution by a priest and a guard
- Henrettelsen
- Directed by: Peter Elfelt
- Written by: Christian Lundsgaard; C. Scheel Vandel
- Produced by: Peter Elfelt
- Starring: Francesca Nathansen; Victor Betzonich
- Cinematography: Peter Elfelt
- Release date: 1903
- Running time: 3 minutes
- Country: Denmark
- Language: Silent film

Capital Execution (Danish: Henrettelsen) is a 1903 silent film drama directed by Danish photographer Peter Elfelt. Based upon a true story, the short 15-minute film relates the execution of a French woman who is condemned to death for killing her two children. It was the first dramatic movie made by a Danish filmmaker, and is notable as an early example of a dramatic film that referenced action outside the picture frame. Elfelt used a typical stationary, one-shot camera position, but directed the actors to gesture and enter and exit with reference to things happening outside of the audience's view. This allowed for the development of the story beyond what was captured by camera, and expanded the dramatic scope of film.

Henrettelsen (fragment)

== Known footage ==
The only known copy of the film is incomplete, comprising only 25 meters of film, while the original length was 40 meters. According to later descriptions, the film showed a murderess seated inside a prison cell, then being ushered to her place of execution. In the existing footage, the woman (Francesca Nathansen) is led through a door and up a sunlit gangway by a priest and a prison guard. As they come through the gangway, a man in a top hat waits for them in the foreground. When they approach, he removes his hat and joins the guard in ushering the woman out of the picture. The priest is shown watching them leave and wiping a tear from his eye. In the subsequent lost footage, the woman is led to the place of execution, where she kneels down and places her head on the guillotine.

== Reactions ==
According to the actress Nathansen, only a few days after filming, Henrettelsen premiered with great success at the Panoptikonbygningen in Copenhagen. It is possible that it had another title, Barnemordersken (Child Murderess), but it is listed in Elfelt's protocol of negatives as Henrettelsen. When Elfelt was asked in 1926 if he had ever filmed a drama, he remembered being reluctant about this film.

For one to think of showing this murder in living pictures – a horrible idea. I was absolutely not taken by it.

— Peter Elfelt, Filmen June 7, 1926

== Cast ==
- Victor Betzonich
- Francesca Nathansen ... the condemned murderess
