= Peter Elfelt =

Danish photographer and film director

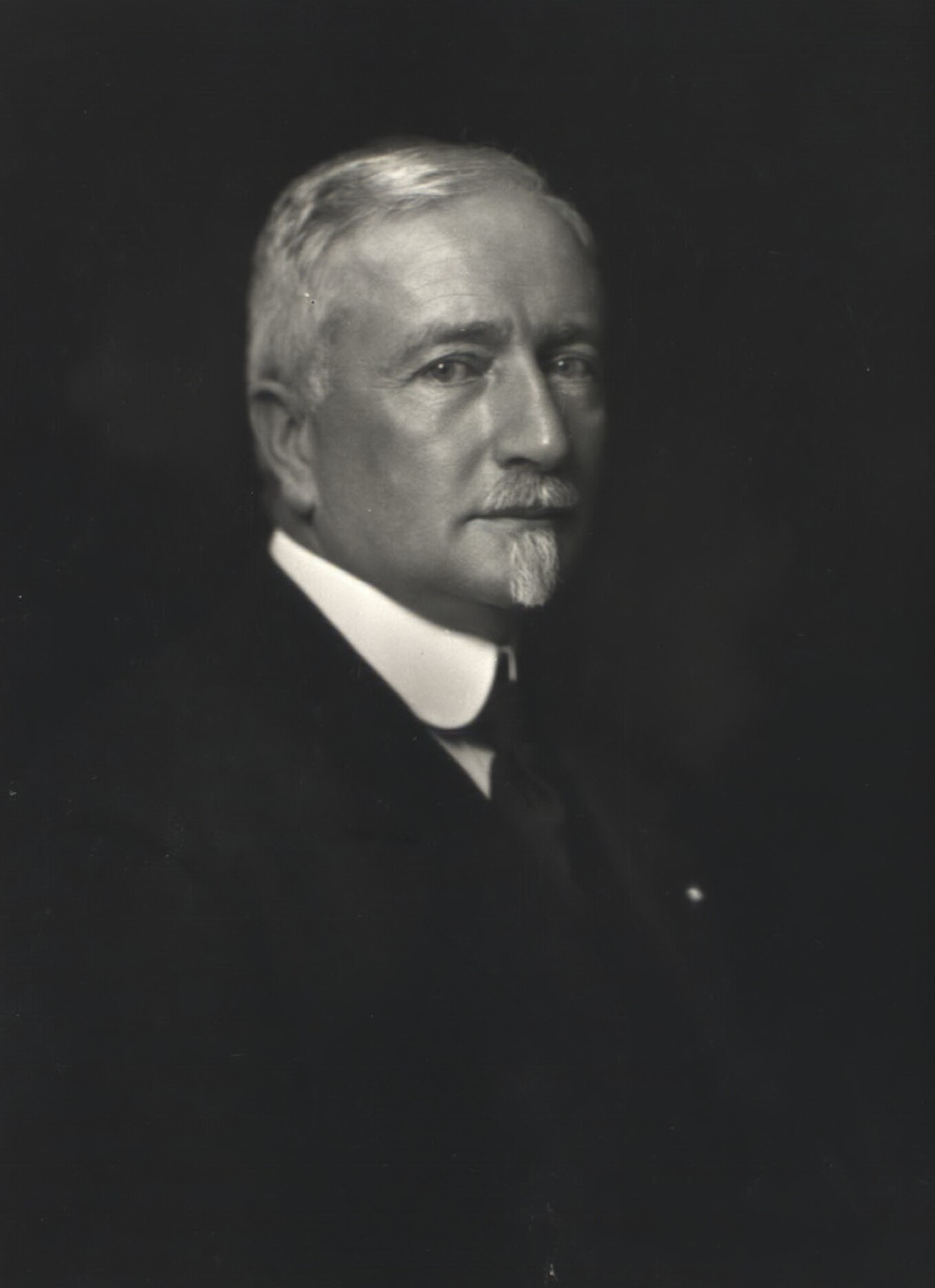
- Photographic self-portrait by Peter Elfelt
- Born: 1 January 1866; Elsinore, Denmark
- Died: 18 February 1931 (aged 65); Copenhagen, Denmark
- Resting place: Assistens Cemetery, Copenhagen
- Occupation(s): Photographer; Film director
- Years active: 1893–1907

Peter Elfelt (1 January 1866 – 18 February 1931) was a Danish photographer and film director known as the first movie pioneer in Denmark when he began making documentary films in 1897.

== Biography ==
Peter Elfelt was born Peter Lars Petersen in Denmark on 1 January 1866. (He changed his name to Elfelt when he began making films.) He apprenticed in photography in Hillerød in 1893 with the photographer Carl Rathsack. He also studied with the camera builder Jens Poul Andersen. In 1893, Elfelt opened his own atelier in Copenhagen with his two brothers as his assistants. As his photographic skills became appreciated, his business flourished and by 1901 Elfelt was named "Kongelige Hoffotograf" (Royal Court Photographer).

During a trip to Paris in 1896, Elfelt obtained a set of detailed Cinematographe plans from the French inventor Jules Carpentier. He had a film camera constructed by Jens Poul Andersen. In the beginning of 1897, he shot the first Danish film – a one-minute sequence called Driving with Greenland Dogs (Danish: Kørsel med grønlandske hunde). During the following 15 years, he made short nature films and newsreels about the Danish royal family. Elfelt shot almost 200 short films in all.

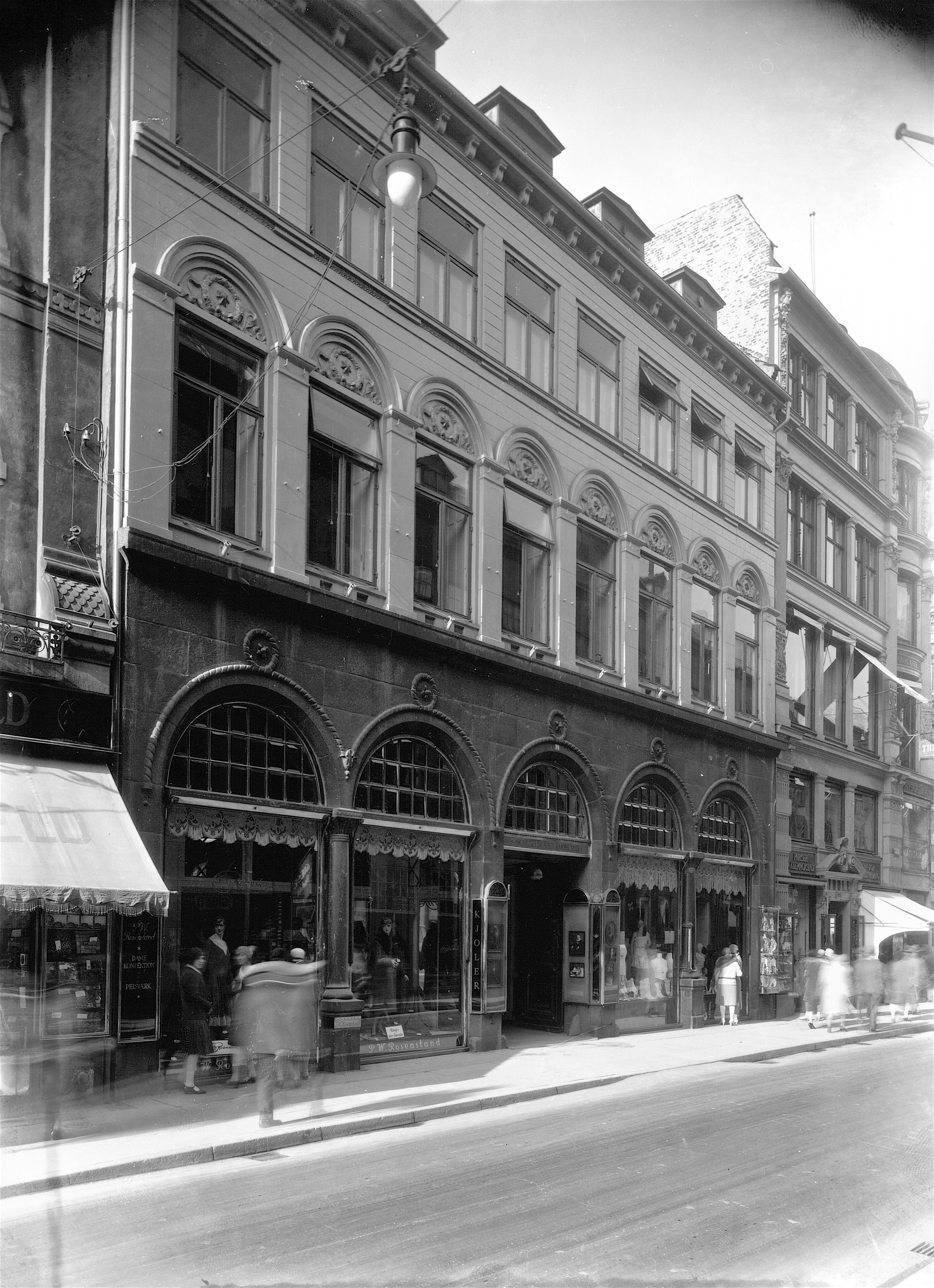
Elfelt's Photo Studios at Østergade 23 in Copenhagen

In 1903 Elfelt filmed his only drama. The short film, titled Henrettelsen (Capital Execution), was the first fiction film made in Denmark. Based upon the actual execution of a French woman who murdered her two children, it starred the singer Francesca Nathansen and was filmed in the arcade of the Christiansborg Castle. There is some doubt whether the film was ever shown in public. When Elfelt was asked in 1926 if he had ever filmed a drama, he remembered being reluctant about this film.

For one to think of showing this murder in living pictures – a horrible idea. I was absolutely not taken by it.

— Peter Elfelt, Filmen June 7, 1926

Elfelt also shot the first advertising film. There is a 1904 example that advertises bock beer for the Svendborg Brewery. Elfelt opened the "København Kinoptikon" movie theater in 1901. Although Elfelt was Denmark's first pioneer of filmmaking, he considered film as secondary to his work as a photographer. Elfelt died on 18 February 1931.

== Filmography ==
- Kørsel med Grønlandske Hunde (1897)
- Kongelige skal fotograferes (1899)
- Kejserinde Dagmars Ankomst til Helsingør (1900)
- Czar Nikolai II's Ankomst til Helsingør (1901)
- Dronning Alexandras Ankomst til Toldboden (1902)
- Kejserinde Dagmars Ankomst til Bellevue (1902)
- Kong Christian IX modtager Storhertug Friedrich-Franz af Mecklenburg Schwerin (1903)
- Sylfiden (1903)
- Tarantellen af Napoli (1903)
- Kongejagt paa Hveen (1903)
- Prinsesse Marie til Hest (1903)
- De Kongelige paa Cykler i Fredensborg Slotsgaard (1903)
- Henrettelsen (1903)
- Kejser Wilhelms Ankomst til København (1903)
- Ribe Domkirkes indvielse (1904)
- Daniel Dalsgaards Kaffeforretning (1904)
- Zigeunerdans af Troubaduren (1906)
- Skiløb. Holmenkollen (1906)
- Kong Haakons Besøg paa "Herluf Trolle" (1906)
- Orfeus og Eurydike (1906)
- Livjægerne paa Amager (1906)
- Kong Frederik VIII's Proklamation (1906)
- Islands Altings Besøg i København (1906)
- Kong Frederik VIII's Ankomst til Berlin (1907)

== See also ==
- Photography in Denmark
- Sophus Juncker-Jensen
