= Meet Me on Cassiopeia =

1951 film

- Directed by: Torben Anton Svendsen
- Written by: Fleming Lynge; Børge Müller
- Produced by: Erik Balling
- Starring: Bodil Kjer
- Cinematography: Poul Pedersen; Jørgen Skov
- Edited by: Elna Sevel
- Distributed by: Nordisk Film
- Release date: 4 October 1951
- Running time: 101 minutes
- Country: Denmark
- Language: Danish

Meet Me on Cassiopeia (Danish: Mød mig på Cassiopeia) is a 1951 Danish musical film directed by Torben Anton Svendsen. The story is about a Muse played by Bodil Kjer interfering in a contemporary theater production, who gets as inspired by Earthly life as she inspires them. The musical was a big hit in Denmark at the time, but is probably best remembered for several top hits written for it, many of which still gets modern covers made of them; among others Den allersidste dans (The Very Last Dance) and Musens sang (The Song of the Muse).

== Cast ==
- Bodil Kjer as The Muse Polyhymnia
- Lily Broberg as Irene Berger
- Hans Kurt as John Berger
- Poul Reichhardt as Lieutenant Harry Smith
- Ellen Gottschalch as Rosa Ellias
- Johannes Meyer as Zeus
- Ib Schønberg as Volmer
- John Price as Professor Ørnfeldt
- Knud Heglund as Head Waiter Mortensen
- Edith Hermansen as Mrs. Larsen
- Per Buckhøj as Man in control tower
- Keld Markuslund as Waiter Christiansen
- Bjørn Spiro as Dancer
- Lis Adelvard
- Svend Bille as Stage hand
- Ego Brønnum-Jacobsen as Police officer
- Anna Henriques-Nielsen as Mrs. Larsen
- Thorkil Lauritzen as Inspector
