= Frihed forpligter =

1951 film

- Directed by: Alice O'Fredericks; Robert Saaskin
- Written by: Leck Fischer
- Starring: Inger Stender
- Cinematography: Rudolf Frederiksen
- Release date: 8 October 1951
- Running time: 60 minutes
- Country: Denmark
- Language: Danish

Frihed forpligter (English translation: Duties of Freedom is a 1951 Danish film directed by Alice O'Fredericks and Robert Saaskin.

== Cast ==
- Inger Stender
- Helga Frier
- Lily Broberg
- Sigurd Langberg
- Ib Schønberg
- Johannes Meyer
- Poul Reichhardt
- Karl Gustav Ahlefeldt
- Elga Olga Svendsen
- Mantza Rasmussen
- Aage Foss
- Preben Lerdorff Rye
- Thorkil Lauritzen
