= Faith, Hope and Witchcraft =

1960 film

- Directed by: Erik Balling
- Written by: Erik Balling; William Heinesen
- Produced by: John Hilbert; Carl Rald
- Starring: Bodil Ipsen
- Cinematography: Poul Pedersen; Erik W. Williamsen
- Edited by: Carsten Dahl
- Distributed by: Nordisk Film
- Release date: 25 March 1960
- Running time: 115 minutes
- Country: Denmark
- Language: Danish

Faith, Hope and Witchcraft (Danish: Tro, håb og trolddom) is a 1960 Danish family film directed by Erik Balling and starring Bodil Ipsen. It was entered into the 10th Berlin International Film Festival.

== Cast ==
- Bodil Ipsen – Bedstemor Gunhild
- Gunnar Lauring – Jonas
- Louis Miehe-Renard – Enok
- Peter Malberg – Peter
- Poul Reichhardt – Rubanus
- Birte Bang – Eva
- Berthe Qvistgaard – Sally
- Jakob Nielsen – Huskarlen Jacob
- Hanne Winther-Jørgensen – Bruden
- Oscar Hermansen – Brudgommen
- Poul Müller – Præsten
- Freddy Koch – Sysselmanden
- Børge Møller Grimstrup – Nystuebonden
- Ole Larsen – Gammelstuebonden
- Kjeld Jacobsen – Bestyrer på Hvalfangerstationen
- Carl Ottosen – Nicolajsen
- Victor Montell
- Valsø Holm – Hotelejer
- Gunnar Strømvad
- Ernst Schou
- Sjurdur Patursson
- Frazer Eysturoy
- Else Kornerup
- Henry Lohmann
- Axel Strøbye – Vred mand
- Vilhelm Henriques
- Flemming Dyjak – Ung mand
- John Hahn-Petersen – Bartender
- Edith Hermansen
- Edith Trane
- Bertel Lauring
- Bjørn Spiro – Betjent
