= Otte akkorder =

1944 film

- Directed by: Johan Jacobsen
- Written by: Arvid Müller
- Produced by: Tage Nielsen
- Starring: Erling Schroeder
- Cinematography: Einar Olsen
- Edited by: Edith Schlüssel
- Release date: 4 November 1944
- Running time: 104 minutes
- Country: Denmark
- Language: Danish

Otte akkorder is a 1944 Danish family film directed by Johan Jacobsen and starring Erling Schroeder.

== Cast ==
- Erling Schroeder - Georg
- Asbjørn Andersen - Johannes
- Buster Larsen - Bud
- Peter Malberg - Spillelærer Jørgensen
- Hans-Henrik Krause - Spilleelev
- Bodil Kjer - Ellen
- Gunnar Lauring - Poul
- Poul Reumert - Jørgen Svane
- Katy Valentin - Agnes Svane
- Poul Reichhardt - Aksel Henriksen
- Charles Wilken - Thomas
- Petrine Sonne - Kogekone Elisabeth Sørensen
- Inge Hvid-Møller - Gertrud Iversen
- Eyvind Johan-Svendsen - Apotekeren
- Ebbe Rode - Manfred Thomsen
- Randi Michelsen - Emmy Knudsen
- Helle Virkner - Grethe
- Henry Nielsen - Pantelåner
- Anna Henriques-Nielsen - Fru Petersen
- Ib Schønberg - Direktør Steensen
- Elith Pio - Viggo Jensen
- Johannes Meyer - Værtshusholder Hansen
- Olaf Ussing - Bartender
- Poul Thomsen - Værtshusgæst
