= Incognito (1937 film) =

1937 film

- Directed by: Valdemar Lauritzen
- Written by: Mogens Dam; Valdemar Lauritzen
- Starring: Ib Schønberg
- Cinematography: Carlo Bentsen
- Release date: 8 February 1937
- Running time: 100 minutes
- Country: Denmark
- Language: Danish

Incognito (Danish: Inkognito) is a 1937 Danish family film directed by Valdemar Lauritzen and starring Ib Schønberg.

== Cast ==
- Ib Schønberg as Olaf Brammer
- Arthur Jensen as Butler Eriksen
- Else Jarlbak as Diane Jacobsen
- Ellen Jansø as Birthe Rømer
- Agnes Rehni as Fru Jacobsen
- Sigfred Johansen as Frits Holgersen
- Johannes Meyer as Direktør A. Schram
- Jon Iversen as Komponist Carlo Tangonini
- Finn Olsen as Filialbestyrer Kragh
- Connie Meiling as Lille Connie
- Miskow Makwarth as Ekspedient
- Poul Reichhardt as Kriminalbetjent
- Valdemar Skjerning as Landsretssagfører
- Henry Nielsen as Lirekassemand
- Kai Holm
