= Fodboldpræsten =

1951 film

- Film poster
- Directed by: Alice O'Fredericks
- Written by: Grete Frische; Jens Locher
- Produced by: Henning Karmark
- Starring: Jørgen Reenberg
- Cinematography: Rudolf Frederiksen
- Music by: Sven Gyldmark
- Release date: 24 September 1951
- Running time: 99 minutes
- Country: Denmark
- Language: Danish

Fodboldpræsten is a 1951 Danish family film directed by Alice O'Fredericks.

== Cast ==
- Jørgen Reenberg as Præst Søren Holm
- Grethe Thordahl as Inger Dahl
- Ib Schønberg as Direktør Jacob Dahl
- Peter Malberg as Degnen Ottesen
- Helga Frier as Fru Dahl
- Inger Stender as Aase Dahl
- Johannes Meyer as Prokurist Nielsen
- Erika Voigt as Menighedsrådsformand Fru Andersen
- Preben Neergaard as Ole Dahl
- William Rosenberg as Egon Petersen
- Buster Larsen as Mads
- Louis Miehe-Renard as Peter Hansen
- Tove Maës as Lilly
- Hannah Bjarnhof as Jytte Dahl
- Elise Berg Madsen as Lise Lotte Dahl
- Betty Helsengreen as Tjenestepigen Maria
- Henry Nielsen - Kustode
- Poul Müller as Læge
- Ole Monty as Tilskuer
- Gunnar Hansen as himself
- Agnes Rehni as Peters Mor
