= My Son Peter =

1953 film

- Directed by: Jon Iversen
- Written by: Lis Byrdal (play)
- Produced by: Gotfred Kolrengen
- Starring: Gunnar Lauring; Berthe Qvistgaard; Frits Helmuth
- Cinematography: Henning Bendtsen; Einar Olsen
- Edited by: Edith Schlüssel
- Music by: Sven Gyldmark
- Production company: Palladium Productions
- Release date: 29 July 1953
- Running time: 87 minutes
- Country: Denmark
- Language: Danish

My Son Peter (Danish: Min søn Peter) is a 1953 Danish film directed by Jon Iversen and starring Gunnar Lauring, Berthe Qvistgaard and Frits Helmuth.

== Cast ==
- Gunnar Lauring as Michael
- Berthe Qvistgaard as Lydia
- Frits Helmuth as Peter
- Helga Frier as Husholdersken Josse
- Lily Broberg as Herdis Winkel
- Helge Kjærulff-Schmidt as Vekseler Philip Nickelmann
- Agnes Rehni as Fru Nickelmann
- Arthur Jensen as Chauffør Alfred Olsen
- Johannes Meyer as Carl Frederik
- Ulla Lock as Annelise
- Keld Markuslund as Telegrafbudet
- Henry Nielsen
- Ib Schønberg as Mand på dræsine

== Bibliography ==
- Jill Nelmes & Jule Selbo. Women Screenwriters: An International Guide. Palgrave Macmillan, 2015.
