= The Invisible Army =

1945 film

- Directed by: Johan Jacobsen
- Written by: Knud Sønderby
- Produced by: Tage Nielsen
- Starring: Bodil Kjer
- Cinematography: Karl Andersson; Rudolf Frederiksen
- Edited by: Edith Schlüssel
- Release date: 6 October 1945
- Running time: 84 minutes
- Country: Denmark
- Language: Danish

The Invisible Army (Danish: Den usynlige hær) is a 1945 Danish war film directed by Johan Jacobsen and starring Bodil Kjer.

== Cast ==
- Bodil Kjer as Alice
- Ebbe Rode as Jørgen
- Mogens Wieth as Poul
- Maria Garland as Alices mor
- Poul Müller as Michelsen
- Asbjørn Andersen as Direktøren
- Henry Nielsen as Portner på Metrodan
- Jakob Nielsen as Værkfører på Metrodan
- Ole Monty as Betjent
- Svend Methling as Præst
- Lau Lauritzen as Tysk Kriminalrat
- Edvin Tiemroth as Modstandsmand
- Buster Larsen as Modstandsmand
- Kjeld Petersen as Modstandsmand
- Kjeld Jacobsen as Mand der fortæller rygte videre
- Preben Mahrt as Mand der fortæller rygte videre
- Gyrd Løfquist
- Karl Jørgensen
- Steen Gregers
- Valdemar Skjerning as Politimester
- Ellen Margrethe Stein as Georges mor
- Sigurd Langberg as Georges far
- Aage Foss
- Carl Johan Hviid as Viktor Emilius Sørensen
- Poul Reichhardt as Modstandsmand
