= Kai Holm =

Danish actor

- Born: 4 March 1896; Lemvig, Denmark
- Died: 10 July 1985 (aged 89); Denmark
- Occupation: Actor
- Years active: 1927–1979

Kai Holm (4 March 1896 – 10 July 1985) was a Danish film actor. He appeared in 41 films between 1927 and 1979. He was born in Lemvig, Denmark and died in Denmark.

== Filmography ==
- Vester Vov-Vov - 1927
- Tordenstenene - 1927
- Hallo! Afrika forude! - 1929
- Præsten i Vejlby - 1931
- Kirke og orgel - 1932
- Nøddebo Præstegård - 1934
- Flight from the Millions - 1934
- Snushanerne - 1936
- Inkognito - 1937
- Livet på Hegnsgaard - 1938
- Kongen bød - 1938
- Sørensen og Rasmussen - 1940
- I de gode gamle dage - 1940
- Sommerglæder - 1940
- Tordenskjold går i land - 1942
- Forellen - 1942
- Ditte Menneskebarn - 1946
- For frihed og ret - 1949
- Vesterhavsdrenge - 1950
- The Old Mill on Mols - 1953
- Kongeligt besøg - 1954
- Karen, Maren og Mette - 1954
- Altid ballade - 1955
- Kristiane af Marstal - 1956
- Seksdagesløbet - 1958
- Det tossede paradis - 1962
- Støvsugerbanden - 1963
- Don Olsen kommer til byen - 1964
- Døden kommer til middag - 1964
- Flådens friske fyre - 1965
- Der var engang - 1966
- Elsk din næste - 1967
- Nyhavns glade gutter - 1967
- Takt og tone i himmelsengen - 1972
- På'en igen Amalie - 1973
- Bejleren - en jysk røverhistorie - 1975
- Drømme støjer ikke når de dør - 1979
