= Sønnen fra Amerika =

1957 film

- Directed by: Jon Iversen
- Written by: Jon Iversen; Paul Sarauw; Johan Skjoldborg
- Produced by: Henning Karmark
- Starring: Peter Malberg
- Cinematography: Henning Bendtsen
- Edited by: Edith Schlüssel
- Distributed by: ASA Film
- Release date: 14 October 1957
- Running time: 85 minutes
- Country: Denmark
- Language: Danish

Sønnen fra Amerika is a 1957 Danish family film directed by Jon Iversen and starring Peter Malberg.

== Cast ==
- Peter Malberg as Niels 'Pind' Nielsen
- Poul Reichhardt as Jens Nielsen
- Emil Hass Christensen as Squier Karl Kristian Duue
- Lisbeth Movin as Ingrid
- Sigrid Horne-Rasmussen as Mine Holm
- Kjeld Petersen as The Vet
- Holger Juul Hansen as Teacher Jesper Jensen
- Anna Hagen as Mads
- Preben Kaas as Preben
- Louis Miehe-Renard as Under Manager Palle Reamussen
- Knud Heglund as Grocer Peter Mikkelsen
- Helga Frier as Alma Mikkelsen
- Vera Tørresø as Lise Mikkelsen
- Poul Petersen as Lawyer Viggo Lange
- Preben Lerdorff Rye as A Worker
- Henry Nielsen as Member of the Parish Council
- Bjørn Puggaard-Müller as Antique dealer Sejersen
- Lise Thomsen as Daughter at inn
- Henry Lohmann as Waiter at inn
- Marie Brink as Karen
- Carl Ottosen
