= Asbjørn Andersen (actor) =

Danish actor and film director

- Born: 30 August 1903; Copenhagen, Denmark
- Died: 12 December 1978 (aged 75); Silkeborg, Denmark
- Occupations: Actor, film director
- Years active: 1930–1976

Asbjørn Andersen (30 August 1903 – 12 December 1978) was a Danish film actor and director. He appeared in more than 90 films between 1930 and 1976. He also directed nine films between 1946 and 1952.

He was born in Copenhagen, Denmark and died in Denmark.

== Filmography ==
- Med fuld musik (1933)
- Københavnere (1933)
- Barken Margrethe af Danmark (1934)
- 7-9-13 (1934)
- De bør forelske Dem (1935)
- Week-End (1935)
- Panserbasse (1936)
- Snushanerne (1936)
- Giftes-nej tak (1936)
- Det begyndte ombord (1937)
- Flådens blå matroser (1937)
- En lille tilfældighed (1939)
- Jens Langkniv (1940)
- Vi kunne ha' det så rart (1942)
- Natekspressen (P. 903) (1942)
- Et skud før midnat (1942)
- Ta' briller på (1942)
- Regnen holdt op (1942)
- Det brændende spørgsmål (1943)
- Når man kun er ung (1943)
- Mine kære koner (1943)
- Kriminalassistent Bloch (1943)
- Otte akkorder (1944)
- Den usynlige hær (1945)
- Affæren Birte (1945)
- I går og i morgen (1945)
- Man elsker kun een gang (1945)
- Det gælder din frihed (1946)
- Oktoberroser (1946)
- Mani (1947)
- Sikken en nat (1947)
- My name is Petersen (1947)
- Lykke på rejsen (1947)
- Mens porten var lukket (1948)
- Tre år efter (1948)
- For frihed og ret (1949)
- John og Irene (1949)
- Historien om Hjortholm (1950)
- Café Paradis (1950)
- Mosekongen (1950)
- Fra den gamle købmandsgård (1951)
- Alt dette og Island med (1951)
- Lyntoget (1951)
- Bag de røde porte (1951)
- Kærlighedsdoktoren (1952)
- Adam og Eva (1953)
- Jan går til filmen (1954)
- Altid ballade (1955)
- Blændværk (1955)
- Den store gavtyv (1956)
- Hvad vil De ha'? (1956)
- Ung leg (1956)
- Ingen tid til kærtegn (1957)
- Tre piger fra Jylland (1957)
- Tag til marked i Fjordby (1957)
- Mariannes bryllup (1958)
- Verdens rigeste pige (1958)
- Paw (1959)
- Eventyrrejsen (1960)
- Frihedens pris (1960)
- Gymnasiepigen (1960)
- Flemming på kostskole (1961)
- Reptilicus (1961)
- Gøngehøvdingen (1961)
- Det stod i avisen (1962)
- Han, hun, Dirch og Dario (1962)
- Prinsesse for en dag (1962)
- Det støver stadig (1962)
- Støv for alle pengene (1963)
- Et døgn uden løgn (1963)
- Kampen om Næsbygaard (1964)
- Næsbygaards arving (1965)
- Mor bag rattet (1965)
- Søskende (1966)
- Krybskytterne på Næsbygaard (1966)
- Slap af, Frede (1966)
- Dage i min fars hus (1968)
- De røde heste (1968)
- Stormvarsel (1968)
- Ballade på Christianshavn (1971)
- Manden på Svanegården (1972)
- Olsen Bandens store kup (1972)
- I din fars lomme (1973)
- Kassen stemmer (1976)
- Olsen-banden ser rødt (1976)
