= Pas på svinget i Solby =

1940 film

- Directed by: Lau Lauritzen Jr. Alice O'Fredericks
- Written by: Schamyl Bauman; Paul Sarauw
- Produced by: Henning Karmark
- Starring: Ludvig Brandstrup
- Cinematography: Karl Andersson
- Edited by: Marie Ejlersen
- Release date: 19 August 1940
- Running time: 95 minutes
- Country: Denmark
- Language: Danish

Pas på svinget i Solby is a 1940 Danish family film directed by Lau Lauritzen Jr. and Alice O'Fredericks.

== Cast ==
- Ludvig Brandstrup as Hauge
- Berthe Qvistgaard as Marianne Hauge
- Sigfred Johansen as Pastor Holger Lind
- Maria Garland as Tante Marie
- Jon Iversen as Biskoppen
- Ingeborg Pehrson as Fru Augusta Larsen
- Sigurd Langberg as Larsen
- Thorkil Lauritzen as Tjener Christensen
- Else Jarlbak as Biskoppens kone
- Ib Schønberg as Doktor Gustav Berg
- Helge Kjærulff-Schmidt as Automobilforhandler
- Connie Meiling as Anna Pedersen
- Tove Arni as Mariannes Veninde
- Henry Nielsen - Svendsen
- Astrid Villaume as Ung pige ved bal
- Knud Heglund as Købmand Sigvaldsen
