= The Swedenhielm Family =

1947 film

- Directed by: Lau Lauritzen
- Written by: Leck Fischer
- Based on: Swedenhielms by Hjalmar Bergman
- Produced by: Jens Dennow; Henning Karmark
- Starring: Poul Reumert; Ebbe Rode; Beatrice Bonnesen
- Cinematography: Rudolf Frederiksen
- Edited by: Marie Ejlersen
- Music by: Sven Gyldmark
- Production company: ASA Film
- Distributed by: ASA Film
- Release date: 13 January 1947
- Running time: 93 minutes
- Country: Denmark
- Language: Danish

The Swedenhielm Family (Danish: Familien Swedenhielm) is a 1947 Danish comedy film directed by Lau Lauritzen and starring Poul Reumert, Ebbe Rode and Beatrice Bonnesen. It was shot at the ASA Film Studios at Lyngby in Copenhagen. It is based on the 1925 play Swedenhielms by Hjalmar Bergman, previously adapted into a 1935 Swedish film Swedenhielms directed by Gustaf Molander

== Cast ==
- Poul Reumert as Rolf Swedenhielm sr.
- Ebbe Rode as Rolf Swedenhielm jr.
- Beatrice Bonnesen as Julia Kørner
- Kjeld Arrild as Mand i lufthavn
- Mogens Brandt as Disponent
- Per Buckhøj as Instruktør
- Poul Bundgaard as Mand i lufthavn
- Hulda Didrichsen as Påklæderske
- Ejner Federspiel as Nielsen
- Maria Garland as Martha Boman
- Alfred Hansen as Gammel mand
- Kjeld Jacobsen as Togpassager
- Else Jarlbak as Gustava
- Preben Kaas as Kontorassistent
- Preben Neergaard as Journalist Pedersen
- Henry Nielsen as Portner
- Poul Nordstrøm as Observatør
- Ib Schønberg as Eriksson
- Ove Sprogøe as Togpassager
- Osvald Vallini as Tjener
- Lily Weiding as Astrid
- Mogens Wieth as Løjtnant Bo Swedenhielm

== Bibliography ==
- Goble, Alan. The Complete Index to Literary Sources in Film. Walter de Gruyter, 1999.
