= The Red Horses (1950 film) =

1950 film

- Front cover of the Danish DVD for The Red Horses
- Directed by: Alice O'Fredericks; Jon Iversen
- Written by: Morten Korch (novel)
- Produced by: Henning Karmark
- Starring: Poul Reichhardt; Tove Maës
- Cinematography: Lau Lauritzen Jr.
- Edited by: Marie Ejlersen
- Music by: Sven Gyldmark
- Distributed by: ASA Filmudlejning
- Release date: 9 January 1950
- Running time: 107 minutes
- Country: Denmark
- Language: Danish

The Red Horses, (Danish: De Røde Heste), is a 1950 Danish romantic drama directed by Alice O'Fredericks and Jon Iversen, based on the popular novel by Morten Korch. The film stars Poul Reichhardt and Tove Maës as young newlyweds who try to save an old family farm by winning a horse race. The Red Horses is the most watched Danish film of all time.

== Plot ==
Ole Offor (Poul Reichhardt) a young graduate from agricultural college, returns home to discover that rumors about his fiancé (Lily Broberg) cheating on him are true. Ole rejects her thin denials and decides to move to Canada to start a new life. In the meantime, Ole's father, Hans (Johannes Meyer), meets with an old childhood friend, Munk (Ejner Federspiel), who is seriously ill. Munk owns a beautiful old stud farm called Enekaer, but he has left it nearly bankrupt. Hans promises Munk that he will help. Hans asks Ole to become the manager of Enekaer and see if it can be saved.

Munk purchased some fine ponies of a red breed which he had hoped could be trained as winning trotters and save the farm. However, his bad heart left him bed-ridden. Munk's second wife, Zita (Else Jarlbak) has been having an affair with the vicious horse trainer, Willers (Jørn Jeppesen). When Munk discovers this, he sues for divorce, but Willers now owns outstanding notes on the farm. Ole arrives and meets Munk's daughter, Bente (Tove Maës). The daughter from Munk's first marriage, Bente is sweet woman with a slightly crippled leg from a horse riding accident. Ole quickly becomes taken with Bente. Willers is paid off by Ole and his father and told to disappear. Munk, on his death bed, tells Ole and Bente that his last wish is for them to marry.

Enekaer has one fine stallion named Junker that Munk hoped could win the 15,000 Kroner prize at the trotting derby. But Willers had ruined Junker's nerves. Ole and Bente care for Junker and he regains strength and speed. Ole falls in love with Bente and proposes. They marry but the marriage is uneasy because Bente feels that Ole married her out of charity. One day Zita Munk returns but Ole and Bente refuse her admittance to Enekaer. They are called into court because Zita possesses Munk life insurance which gives her financial control of Enekaer. The court gives Ole and Bente a brief time to raise the money or give up the farm.

They are despondent, but after all they have been through, Bente finally has realized that Ole truly loves her. On Derby day, Ole decides to race Junker himself. Everyone at Enekaer bets all of their money on Ole and Junker. Ole races to victory and in happiness, Ole and Bente return to Enekaer.

== Cast ==
- Johannes Meyer as Hans Offor
- Poul Reichhardt as Ole Offor
- Pia Ahnfelt-Rønne as Sara Offor
- Peter Malberg as Mikkel Pind
- Lily Broberg as Henriette
- Ejner Federspiel as Anders Munk
- Tove Maës as Bente Munk
- Maria Garland as Konstance Munk
- Else Jarlbak as Zita Munk
- Jørn Jeppesen as Stefan Willers
- Kai Lind as Jørgen Senille
- Mette Bjerre as Dorthe Senille
- Ib Conradi as Peter Snille
- Christen Møller as Dr. Sørenen
- Knud Hallest as Sagfører Nielsen

== Reaction ==
Although his novels were popular in the 1930s, Morten Korch had been unsuccessful in having his depictions of rural life filmed at Nordisk Film, the largest film studio in Denmark. Still available in the period after World War II, Korch's stories became a gold mine for the smaller ASA Film Company. The Red Horses was seen by more than 2.3 million people and is considered the most popular Danish film ever. It was quickly followed by 16 more films of Korch stories, all filmed at ASA and directed by O'Fredericks.

== Remakes ==
The film was made in Swedish in 1954 The Red Horses (De Röda hästarna). In 1968, it was remade in Denmark by ASA Film, directed by Annelise Meineche, and again starred Poul Reichhardt, but in the role of the father, Hans Offor. The movie was spoofed with the 1987 comedy Kampen om den røde ko (Fight Over the Red Cow).

== See also ==
- List of films about horses
- List of films about horse racing
