= Poul Reichhardt =

Danish actor (1913–1985)

- Born: 2 February 1913; Ganløse, Egedal Municipality, Denmark
- Died: 31 October 1985 (aged 72); Charlottenlund, Denmark
- Years active: 1932-1981

Poul David Reichhardt (2 February 1913 – 31 October 1985) was a Danish actor, well known for his roles in Danish 1940s/1950s comedies. Later on, he also played more serious and varied roles; he has also starred in Huset på Christianshavn, Matador and as various minor characters in the Olsen-banden films.

For almost thirty years Reichhardt was a leading man in movies and partly also on stage. His acting debut was in 1931 as an extra in the play Styrmand Karlsens flammer in Nørrebros Theater. Already during the 1930s he won himself a name, this was cemented during World War II and from 1945 he stood as a humorous man playing in melodramas and comedies. His versatile talent of acting and singing created him a widespread area as an artist.

Poul Reichhardt achieved great popularity playing in the Morten Korch movies in the 1950s. Often criticised for playing in low quality products, he always did his best even in poor roles and his temporary overplay and loudness was compensated by his engagement and self-irony. Perhaps his best movie roles were as a resistance man (De røde Enge - "The Red Meadows", 1945), and as the soldier in Soldaten og Jenny, ("The Soldier and Jenny", 1947). His ability as a singer even made him opera roles (Papageno in The Magic Flute) and though normally considered a typical "man of the people" he also mastered the role as a man of the world.

Besides his many popular roles Reichhardt also, mostly on stage, emerged into a respected character actor (Biff and later Willy Loman in Death of a Salesman, Archie in Osborne's The Entertainer, several Shakespeare roles). He also dubbed the animated films Fantasia and The Sword in the Stone when they were released in Danish. Not leaving the heroic line until relatively late he won a new popularity in elder roles also on TV. Perhaps his most popular one was as the blustering and intolerant but yet sympathetic furniture remover Olsen in the series Huset på Christianshavn ("The House on Christianshavn"). In the fall of 1981, he suffered a cerebral hemorrhage, which left him partially paralyzed. For the last four years of his life, the popular actor was dependent on a wheelchair, and Poul Reichhardt died at the age of 72 on 31 October 1985.

Reichhardt is the father of actor Peter Reichhardt.

== Selected filmography ==
- I kantonnement (1931) - Menig
- Odds 777 (1932) - Tjener på Marienlyst
- Han, hun og Hamlet (1932) - Sømand i køje (uncredited)
- Med fuld musik (1933) - Gæst hos Musikforlæggere
- Tango (1933) - Tjener
- 5 raske piger (1933) - Mand der bærer køje
- Københavnere (1933) - Student
- Ud i den kolde sne (1934) - Hotelgæst
- Barken Margrethe (1934) - Sailor at the Boxing Match (uncredited)
- Week-end (1935) - Kaproer
- Snushanerne (1936) - 'Flodhesten', Smugler
- Millionærdrengen (1936) - Mand på plakat
- Panserbasse (1936) - Poul
- Incognito (1937) - Kriminalbetjent
- Frk. Møllers jubilæum (1937) - Peters ven
- Der var engang en vicevært (1937) - Paul
- Alarm (1938) - Falckmand Petersen
- Julia jubilerar (1938) - Den norske skidläraren (uncredited)
- De tre måske fire (1939) - Kontorist - Nielsen
- Nordhavets mænd (1939) - Lorens
- Jens Langkniv (1940) - Jens Langkniv
- I de gode, gamle dage (1940)
- En mand af betydning (1941) - Brødkusk Poul Elvang
- Far skal giftes (1941) - Oskar Jensen
- Peter Andersen (1941) - Harald Andersen
- Tag til Rønneby kro (1941) - Journalist Daniel Jensen
- Frk. Vildkat (1942) - Herbert Rung
- Tyrannens fald (1942) - Mogens Høegh
- Op med humøret (1943)
- Moster fra Mols (1943) - Handelsrejsende Peter Jacobsen
- Det brændende spørgsmål (1943) - Hugo Holm
- En pige uden lige (1943) - Axel Olsen
- Det ender med bryllup (1943) - Reklamefuldmægtig Poul Hammer
- Mordets melodi (1944) - Lysmester Max Stenberg
- Fortidens ekko (1944, Short)
- Elly Petersen (1944) - Hjalmer
- Besættelse (1944) - Aage Thygesen
- Otte akkorder (1944) - Aksel Henriksen
- Mens sagføreren sover (1945) - Charlie
- Stop tyven (1945, Short)
- Den usynlige hær (1945) - Modstandsmand
- De kloge og vi gale (1945) - Per
- De røde enge (1945) - Michael Lans
- Fyrtøjet (1946) - Soldaten (voice)
- Så mødes vi hos Tove (1946) - John Nielsen
- Lise kommer til byen (1947) - Instruktør Dan 'Basse' Burling
- My Name Is Petersen (1947) - Løjtnant John Petersen
- Soldaten og Jenny (1947) - Soldaten Robert Olsen
- Støt står den danske sømand (1948) - Matros Richardt Hansen
- Det gælder os alle (1949) - Jørgen Vedel
- De røde heste (1950) - Ole Offor
- Min kone er uskyldig (1950) - Arkitekt Frederik Lund / Claus Lund
- Café Paradis (1950) - Carlo Jensen
- Mosekongen (1950) - Jørgen Munk
- Kvinnan bakom allt (1951) - Axel Poulsen
- Alt dette og Island med (1951) - Axel Poulsen, botaniker
- Mød mig på Cassiopeia (1951) - Løjtnant Harry Smith
- Frihed forpligter (1951) - Søren Nielsen frihedskæmper
- Det gamle guld (1951) - Niels Sværke
- To minutter for sent (1952) - Max Paduan
- Husmandstøsen (1952) - Gudmund Torpegaard
- Det store løb (1952) - Niels Stone
- Adam og Eva (1953) - Peter
- Far til fire (1953) - Poul Reichhardt
- Fløjtespilleren (1953) - Kurt / Martin Vest
- Hendes store aften (1954) - John Bagger
- En sømand går i land (1954) - Vladimir W. Olsen
- Arvingen (1954) - Underforvalter Anders Jansen
- Blændværk (1955) - Fagforeningsformanden Marinus
- På tro og love (1955) - Hans
- Min datter Nelly (1955) - Dyrlæge Kaare
- Kispus (1956) - The Actor
- Taxa K-1640 Efterlyses (1956) - Eigil Rasmussen
- Qivitoq (1956) - Jens Lauritzen
- Flintesønnerne (1956) - Jesper Poulsen
- Jeg elsker dig (1957) - André
- Sønnen fra Amerika (1957) - Jens Nielsen
- Laan mig din kone (1957) - Portieren
- Englen i sort (1957) - Lennart Sommer
- Verdens rigeste pige (1958) - John
- Seksdagesløbet (1958) - Ivan Reimer
- Vagabonderne på Bakkegården (1958) - Martin
- Tre må man være (1959) - Peter Halling
- Helle for Helene (1959) - Tandlæge Rudolf Thomsen
- Tro, håb og trolddom (1960) - Rubanus
- Det skete på Møllegården (1960) - Martin Poulsen
- Komtessen (1961) - Skovfoged Frank Jensen
- Mine tossede drenge (1961) - Ernst Henriksen
- Jetpiloter (1961) - Oberstløjtnant Bording
- The Counterfeit Traitor (1962) - Fishing Boat Skipper
- Den korte dag er lang nok (1962, TV Movie)
- Det stod i avisen (1962) - Ingrids forlovede
- Rikki og mændene (1962) - Ole
- Der brænder en ild (1962) - Martin
- Dronningens vagtmester (1963) - Ib
- Peters landlov (1963) - Hr. Berg
- Frøken April (1963) - Dr. Gert Stiger
- Sikke'n familie (1963) - Sam Jackson
- Gudrun (1963) - Chefen
- Syd for Tana River (1963) - Axelson
- Paradis retur (1964) - Tonnemann
- Slottet (1964) - Henrik Stenfeldt
- Døden kommer til middag (1964) - Peter Sander
- Kampen om Næsbygaard (1964) - Præsten Prip
- Affæren (1964, TV Movie) - Mosegaard
- Passer passer piger (1965) - Arne Henriksen
- Landmandsliv (1965) - Urias Frederiksen
- Næsbygaards arving (1965) - Pastor Pripp
- Gift (1966) - Henrik Steen
- Flagermusen (1966) - Gabriel von Eisenstein
- Den røde kappe (1967) - (uncredited)
- Jeg er sgu min egen (1967) - Kaptajn Sir William
- Gengangere (1967, TV Movie) - Snedker Engstrand
- Martha (1967) - Maskinmester Bråst
- Mig og min lillebror (1967) - Peter Severinsen
- Mig og min lillebror og storsmuglerne (1968) - Peter Severinsen
- Olsen-banden (1968) - Chefen
- De røde heste (1968) - Hans Offer
- Flagermusen (1968, TV Movie) - Gabriel von Eisenstein
- Kys til højre og venstre (1969) - Edmund
- Olsen-banden på spanden (1969) - Politichefen
- Mig og min lillebror og Bølle (1969) - Peter Severinsen
- Nonnekysset (1969, Short)
- Rend mig i revolutionen (1970) - Efterretningschef
- Ballade på Christianshavn (1971) - Hr. Olsen
- I morgen, min elskede (1971) - Skuespiller
- Lyseholderen (1972, TV Movie) - Clavaroche
- Werner Holgersen - Eventyret i dansk politik (1972, TV Movie) - Werner Holgersen
- Olsen-bandens store kup (1972) - Knægten
- Erasmus Montanus (1973, TV Movie) - Jesper Ridefoged
- Nitten røde roser (1974) - Kriminalassistent Ancher
- Olsen-banden på sporet (1975) - Politichefen (uncredited)
- Den dobbelte mand (1976) - Mortensen
- Affæren i Mølleby (1976) - Borgmester Clemmensen
- Terror (1977) - Kriminalassistent Ancher
- Pas på ryggen, professor (1977) - O.C., Kerstins far
- Slægten (1978) - Vicar Adolf Mascani
- Olsen-banden over alle bjerge (1981) - Havnevagt
