= Mosekongen =

1950 film

- Film poster
- Directed by: Jon Iversen; Alice O'Fredericks
- Written by: Morten Korch; Svend Rindom
- Produced by: Henning Karmark
- Starring: Johannes Meyer
- Cinematography: Rudolf Frederiksen
- Edited by: Marie Ejlersen
- Music by: Sven Gyldmark
- Release date: 26 December 1950
- Running time: 92 minutes
- Country: Denmark
- Language: Danish

Mosekongen is a 1950 Danish family film directed by Jon Iversen and Alice O'Fredericks.

== Cast ==
- Johannes Meyer as Claus Munk
- Poul Reichhardt as Jørgen Munk
- Tove Maës as Hanne
- Peter Malberg as Sofus 'Fusser' Hansen
- Grete Frische as Norma
- William Rosenberg as Erik Jelling
- Signi Grenness as Grete Sander
- Asbjørn Andersen as Julius Sander
- Grethe Holmer as Ellen Madsen
- Randi Michelsen as Abelone Madsen
- Axel Frische as Jesper Madsen
- Agnes Rehni as Fru Karen Winge
- Poul Müller as Ejendomsmægler Søren Just
- Ib Schønberg as Martin Hald
- Helga Frier as Johanne Hald
- Sigurd Langberg as Tjener Rasmussen
- Henry Nielsen as Ole Post
- Jørn Jeppesen as Redaktør Juul
- Ruth Brejnholm as Stuepigen Clara
- Christian Møller as Redaktør Andreasen
- Edith Hermansen
- Anna Henriques-Nielsen as Marianne Wævers
- Carl Heger as Ole
- Aage Foss as Gamle Søren
