= København, Kalundborg og - ? =

- Directed by: Ludvig Brandstrup; Holger-Madsen
- Written by: Ludvig Brandstrup; Flemming Geill
- Starring: Ludvig Brandstrup; Ib Schønberg; Gertrud Jensen; Gösta Ekman
- Release date: 1934
- Running time: 97 mins
- Country: Denmark
- Language: Danish

København, Kalundborg og - ? (English: Copenhagen, Kalundborg and -?) is a 1934 Danish film directed by Ludvig Brandstrup and Holger-Madsen. The film stars Ludvig Brandstrup and Ib Schønberg.

Many of the participating artists are popular Danish actors, but the cast also includes the Swedish actor Gösta Ekman, the American musician Louis Armstrong, the British music hall and vaudeville group Wilson, Keppel and Betty, and several dance orchestras.

== Cast ==
- Ludvig Brandstrup as himself
- Ib Schønberg as Ludvigs friend and colleague
- Gertrud Jensen as herself
- Gösta Ekman as himself
- Jon Iversen as a radiolistener
- Maria Garland as the Consuls wife
- Arthur Jensen as a hairdresser
- Petrine Sonne as a radiolistener
- Ejner Federspiel as the radio director
- Aage Foss as a radiolistener
- Lily Gyenes orchestra
- Louis Armstrong with orchestra
- Teddy Brown
- Roy Foxs orchestra
- Erik Tuxens orchestra
- Jimmy Jade
- Wilson, Keppel and Betty
- Rigmor Reumert
- Palle Reenberg
- Vera Lindstrøm
- Børge Munch Petersen
- Ellen Jansø
- Chr. Engelstoft
