= Tag til Rønneby Kro =

1941 film

- Directed by: Jon Iversen; Alice O'Fredericks
- Written by: Børge Müller
- Produced by: Henning Karmark
- Starring: Johannes Meyer
- Cinematography: Rudolf Frederiksen; Alf Schnéevoigt
- Edited by: Marie Ejlersen
- Release date: 26 December 1941
- Running time: 99 minutes
- Country: Denmark
- Language: Danish

Tag til Rønneby Kro is a 1941 Danish family film directed by Jon Iversen and Alice O'Fredericks.

== Cast ==
- Johannes Meyer as Kroejer Bartholdi
- Bodil Kjer as Anne Lise
- Ib Schønberg as Tjener Sørensen
- Poul Reichhardt as Journalist Daniel Jensen
- Petrine Sonne as Daniels tante
- Henry Nielsen as Landbetjent Mortensen
- Sigrid Horne-Rasmussen as Journalisten Molly
- Sigurd Langberg as Bankdirektøren Julius
- Svend Bille as Ministeren
- Knud Heglund as Professoren
- Lau Lauritzen as Sagføreren
- Valdemar Møller as Smukke Peter
- Jeanne Darville
