= Gaa med mig hjem =

1941 film

- Film poster
- Directed by: Benjamin Christensen
- Written by: Leck Fischer
- Starring: Bodil Ipsen
- Cinematography: Valdemar Christensen
- Release date: 21 November 1941
- Running time: 90 minutes
- Country: Denmark
- Language: Danish

Gaa med mig hjem is a 1941 Danish drama film directed by Benjamin Christensen. It centers on the character Helene Hannøe, an attorney who forms close relationships with her troubled clients while trying to solve their problems. It was the last of three 'social issue' films that Christensen made for the Nordisk Film Company, along with Children of Divorce and The Child.

== Cast ==
- Bodil Ipsen as Helene Hannøe
- Tudlik Johansen as Vera Halkær
- Johannes Meyer as Valdemar Nielsen
- Grethe Holmer as Rudi
- Eigil Reimers as Fritz Elmer
- Mogens Wieth as Asmus Asmussen
- Helga Frier as Frk. Stade
- Karen Lykkehus as Fru Hermansen
- Alma Olander Dam Willumsen as Husbestyrerinde Stoffer (as Alma Olander Dam)
- Peter Malberg as Olsen
- Lis Smed as Stuepigen Doris
