= Far skal giftes =

1941 film

- Directed by: Lau Lauritzen Jr.
- Written by: Axel Frische; Børge Müller
- Produced by: Henning Karmark
- Starring: Helge Kjærulff-Schmidt
- Cinematography: Rudolf Frederiksen; Alf Schnéevoigt
- Edited by: Marie Ejlersen
- Release date: 1 September 1941
- Running time: 92 minutes
- Country: Denmark
- Language: Danish

Far skal giftes (Father is Going to Get Married) is a 1941 Danish comedy film directed by Lau Lauritzen Jr. and starring Helge Kjærulff-Schmidt.

== Cast ==
- Helge Kjærulff-Schmidt as Professor Jacob Jensen
- Ellen Gottschalch as Husbestyrerinde Karen Frederiksen
- Berthe Qvistgaard as Else Margrethe Jensen
- Bodil Kjer as Birthe Jensen
- Poul Reichhardt as Oskar Jensen
- Maria Garland as Tante Rikke Holm
- Eigil Reimers as Harry Holm
- Edvin Tiemroth as Peter Larsen
- Ib Schønberg as Gartner Ørsager
