= Kampen mod uretten =

- Directed by: Ole Pasbo
- Written by: Leck Fischer based on the novel by Sven Sabroe
- Starring: Karin Nellemose; Mogens Wieth
- Cinematography: Verner Jensen
- Edited by: Tove Palsbo
- Music by: Kai Rosenberg
- Release date: 18 March 1949
- Running time: 110 minutes
- Country: Denmark
- Language: Danish

Kampen mod uretten is a 1949 Danish drama film directed by Ole Palsbo, and written by Leck Fischer, based on the novel by Sven Sabroe. The film starred Karin Nellemose and Mogens Wieth. Both received Bodil Awards for their roles, with Nellemose receiving Bodil Award for Best Actress and Wieth winning Bodil Award for Best Actor. It is a social culture film about journalist and activist Peter Sabroe, who promoted the well being of children.

== Cast ==
- Mogens Wieth as Peter Sabroe
- Karin Nellemose as Thyra Sabroe
- Albert Luther as Kancelliråd Møller
- Ellen Margrethe Stein as Fru Møller
- Vera Gebuhr as Fanny
- Paul Holck-Hofmann as Redaktør
- Carl Heger as Murersvend Nielsen
- Grethe Thordahl as Mathilde Nielsen
- Pouel Kern as Lars Mortensen
- Betty Helsengreen as Petra Mortensen
- Sigurd Langberg as Forpagter
- Ib Schønberg as Drengehjemsforstander
- Preben Lerdorff Rye as Opsynsmand Hansen
- Louis Miehe-Renard as Niels
- Aage Fønss as Bestyrelsesformand
- Lily Broberg as Hushjælpen Anna
- Gunnar Lemvigh as Bagermester Eriksen
- Tove Bang as Fru Eriksen
- Hans Egede Budtz as Læge
- Christen Møller
- Kjeld Petersen
- Victor Montell
- Edith Hermansen
- Olaf Ussing
- Johannes Marott
- Henry Nielsen
- Elith Foss
- Gunnar Strømvad
- Thorkil Lauritzen
- Bjørn Watt-Boolsen
- Valdemar Skjerning
- Tavs Neiiendam
- Ove Sprogøe
