= Det store løb =

- Film poster
- Directed by: Alice O'Fredericks
- Written by: Grete Frische; Morten Korch
- Produced by: Henning Karmark
- Starring: Poul Reichhardt
- Cinematography: Rudolf Frederiksen
- Edited by: Wera Iwanouw
- Music by: Sven Gyldmark
- Release date: 22 December 1952
- Running time: 101 minutes
- Country: Denmark
- Language: Danish

Det store løb is a 1952 Danish family film directed by Alice O'Fredericks.

== Cast ==
- Poul Reichhardt as Niels Stone
- Grethe Holmer as Kirsten Hein
- Ib Schønberg as Dr. Hessel
- Johannes Meyer - Godsejer Vilhelm Stone
- Katy Valentin as Fru Helene Stone
- Lisbeth Movin as Gerda Hein
- Per Buckhøj as Henrik Hein
- Valdemar Skjerning as Sagfører Hemme
- William Rosenberg as Claus Hemme
- Helga Frier as Baronessen på Stensholt
- Peter Malberg as Træneren Nich
- Olaf Nordgreen as Hestepasser Kølle
- Agnes Rehni as Jomfru Madsen
- Else Jarlbak as Stuepige
- Lis Weibel as Hjælpepigen Jensine
- Vera Tørresø as En pige
- Birgitte Bruun as Spejderpige
- Knud Schrøder as Kontrolant på travbanen
- Henry Nielsen as DSB medarbejder
- Ove Sprogøe as Drunk man in bus
