= Preben Neergaard =

Danish actor (1920–1990)

- Born: 2 May 1920; Farum, Denmark
- Died: 22 July 1990 (aged 70); Charlottenlund, Denmark

Preben Neergaard (2 May 1920 – 22 July 1990) was a Danish stage and film actor.

== Filmography ==
- Ungdommens rus, 1943
- Vredens dag, 1943
- Teatertosset, 1944
- Elly Petersen, 1944
- De røde enge, 1945
- Diskret ophold, 1946
- Ditte Menneskebarn, 1946
- Far betaler, 1946
- De pokkers unger, 1947
- The Swedenhielm Family, 1947
- Mani, 1947
- Kristinus Bergman, 1948
- Støt står den danske sømand, 1948
- Det hændte i København, 1949
- Susanne, 1950
- Historien om Hjortholm, 1950
- Fodboldpræsten, 1951
- Dorte, 1951
- Ukjent mann, 1951
- The Crime of Tove Andersen, 1953
- Solstik, 1953
- Far til fire i sneen, 1954
- Hvad vil De ha'?, 1956
- 1957: Lån mig din kone
- 1959: Pigen i søgelyset
- 1959: Paw
- Gymnasiepigen, 1960
- Den sidste vinter, 1960
- Den hvide hingst, 1961
- Hvad med os?, 1963
- Slottet, 1964
- Fem mand og Rosa, 1964
- Mennesker mødes og sød musik opstår i hjertet, 1967
- Dage i min fars hus, 1968
- Manden der tænkte ting, 1969
- Mordskab, 1969
- Den første kreds, 1973
- Kun sandheden, 1975
- Hør, var der ikke en som lo?, 1978
- Suzanne og Leonard, 1984
- Peter von Scholten, 1987
