= Tyrannens fald =

1942 film

- Film poster
- Directed by: Jon Iversen; Alice O'Fredericks
- Written by: Svend Rindom (play)
- Produced by: Henning Karmark
- Starring: Eyvind Johan-Svendsen
- Cinematography: Rudolf Frederiksen
- Edited by: Marie Ejlersen
- Music by: Sven Gyldmark
- Release date: 23 October 1942
- Running time: 88 minutes
- Country: Denmark
- Language: Danish

Tyrannens fald is a 1942 Danish family film directed by Jon Iversen and Alice O'Fredericks. It is a remake of Master of the House (1925).

== Cast ==
- Eyvind Johan-Svendsen - Viktor Frandsen
- Karin Nellemose - Ida Frandsen
- Birthe Scherf - Karen Frandsen
- Anker Ørskov - Frederik Frandsen
- Ib Schønberg - Ove Frandsen
- Lily Weiding - Ulla Kryer
- Mathilde Nielsen - Hushjælpen Mads
- Carlo Wieth - Skovrider Axel Høegh
- Poul Reichhardt - Mogens Høegh
- Astrid Villaume - Frk. Anne Høegh / 'Søster'
- Nicolai Neiiendam - Dr. Ulllerup
- Erik Voigt - Fru Danielsen
- Petrine Sonne - Fru Hansen
- Randi Michelsen - Frk. Beck
- Henry Nielsen - Stationsforstander
- Lis Løwert - Ullas veninde Else

== See also ==
- Master of the House (1925)
