= My Name Is Petersen =

1947 film

- Directed by: Christen Jul
- Written by: Johannes Allen
- Produced by: Tage Nielsen
- Starring: Poul Reichhardt
- Cinematography: Einar Olsen
- Edited by: Søren Melson; Edith Schlüssel
- Release date: 29 September 1947
- Running time: 71 minutes
- Country: Denmark
- Language: Danish

My Name Is Petersen is a 1947 Danish drama film directed by Christen Jul and starring Poul Reichhardt.

== Cast ==
- Poul Reichhardt - Løjtnant John Petersen
- Helle Virkner - Aase Petersen
- Gunnar Lauring - Dr. med. Jens Petersen
- Asbjørn Andersen - Dr. med. Niels Henningsen
- Valdemar Skjerning - Professor Svend Holdrup
- Charles Tharnæs - Dr. med. Hans Wandrup
- Per Buckhøj
- Einar Juhl
- Grete Bendix - Fru Henningsen
- Ebba With - Sonja Mikkelsen
- Helge Matzen - Hansen
