= Per Buckhøj =

Danish actor (1902–1964)

- Born: 10 February 1902; Aarhus, Denmark
- Died: 21 October 1964 (aged 62); Frederiksberg, Denmark
- Occupation: Actor
- Years active: 1942–1958

Per Buckhøj (10 February 1902 – 21 October 1964) was a Danish film actor. He appeared in 36 films between 1942 and 1958.

== Partial filmography ==
- Flådens blå matroser (1937) – Mand, der trues
- Alle mand paa dæk (1942) – Landsretssagfører Berggren
- Det store ansvar (1944) – Mand, der svigter ung gravid pige
- Mordets melodi (1944) – Markussen
- Lev livet let (1944) – Personalechef Vilmer
- Affæren Birte (1945) – Anklager
- Mens sagføreren sover (1945) – Betjent
- De røde enge (1945) – Fangevogter Steinz
- Far betaler (1946) – Bergs bekendt
- Oktoberroser (1946) – Direktør
- Hans store aften (1946) – Instruktør
- Så mødes vi hos Tove (1946) – Mogens
- Brevet fra afdøde (1946) – Betjent
- Ditte menneskebarn (1946) – Fuldmægtigen
- The Swedenhielm Family (1947) – Instruktør
- Those Blasted Kids (1947) – Kriminalbetjent Møller
- Ta', hvad du vil ha' (1947) – Redaktør
- My Name Is Petersen (1947)
- Mani (1947) – Ingeniør dr.techn. Poul Derling
- Soldaten og Jenny (1947) – Tjeneren
- Hatten er sat (1947) – Poul Walter
- Røverne fra Rold (1947)
- Lykke på rejsen (1947) – Turist på hotel
- Penge som græs (1948)
- Støt står den danske sømand (1948) – Kaptajn på Marie Grubbe
- Hvor kunde og sælger mødes (1948)
- Det gælder os alle (1949)
- Lyn-fotografen (1950) – Overtjener
- Det sande ansigt (1951) – Kriminalkommisær
- Meet Me on Cassiopeia (1951) – Mand i kontroltårn
- Det gamle guld (1951) – Hans Sværke
- To minutter for sent (1952) – Kriminalassistenten
- Det store løb (1952) – Henrik Hein
- Vi arme syndere (1952) – Planlægger af parkprojekt
- Adam og Eva (1953) – Svend Aage Johansen
- Karen, Maren og Mette (1954)
- Min datter Nelly (1955) – Præst
- Gengæld (1955) – Kriminalassisten
- Ellehammer-filmen (1957) – Narrator
- Stof til eftertanke (1958, Short) – (voice)
- The Vikings (1958) – Bjorn
