= Eigil Reimers =

Danish actor (1904–1976)

- Born: 10 August 1904; Aarhus, Denmark
- Died: 11 November 1976 (aged 72)

Eigil Reimers (10 August 1904 – 11 November 1976) was a Danish actor.

== Filmography ==
- Det sovende hus - 1926
- Med fuld musik - 1933
- 5 raske piger - 1933
- Prisoner Number One- 1935
- Kidnapped - 1935
- Min kone er husar - 1935
- Week-End - 1935
- Millionærdrengen - 1936
- Snushanerne - 1936
- En fuldendt gentleman - 1937
- Champagnegaloppen - 1938
- De tre, måske fire - 1939
- I dag begynder livet - 1939
- I de gode gamle dage - 1940
- Sørensen og Rasmussen - 1940
- Far skal giftes - 1941
- Gå med mig hjem - 1941
- Tror du jeg er født i går? - 1941
- Afsporet - 1942
- Alt for karrieren - 1943
- Hans onsdagsveninde - 1943
- Så mødes vi hos Tove - 1946
- Sikken en nat - 1947
- For frihed og ret - 1949
- Café Paradis - 1950
- Een blandt mange - 1961
- Slottet - 1964
- Tænk på et tal - 1969
