= Det Sande Ansigt =

1951 film

- 1951 Movie Poster by Jerrild
- Directed by: Bodil Ipsen; Lau Lauritzen Jr.
- Written by: Johannes Allen
- Starring: Lau Lauritzen Jr. Johannes Meyer; Lisbeth Movin; Ib Schønberg
- Cinematography: Rudolf Frederiksen
- Edited by: Wera Iwanouw
- Music by: Sven Gyldmark
- Production company: ASA Film
- Distributed by: ASA Film
- Release date: August 21, 1951
- Running time: 95 mins
- Country: Denmark
- Language: Danish

Det Sande Ansigt (English translation: The True Face) is a 1951 Danish film directed by Bodil Ipsen and Lau Lauritzen Jr., written by Johannes Allen, and based upon the novel by Gerhard Rasmussen. The film received the Bodil Award for Best Danish Film of the Year.

== Plot ==
Troels Rolff, a young architect (played by Lau Lauritzen Jr.), is questioned as a suspect for the rape and murder of a 10-year-old girl. He pleads his innocence, and yet he is unable to explain what he was doing the day of the murder. Rolff's world breaks apart as those closest to him – his wife, his father, his pastor and his friends—react to his arrest with varying degrees of suspicion. Even when cleared of the charges, the question remains if he can ever return to his former life of joy and innocence.

== Cast ==
- Lau Lauritzen Jr. as Troels Rolff
- Johannes Meyer as Pastor Mikael Rolff
- Lisbeth Movin as Troels' Girlfriend Sonja
- Ib Schønberg as Editor
- Grethe Thordahl as Troels' Wife
- Oluf Bang as Troels' Father
- Jørn Jeppesen
- Einar Juhl
- Emil Hass Christensen
- Jakob Nielsen
- Elsa Albeck
- Poul Müller
- Louis Miehe-Renard
- Carl Heger
- Per Buckhøj
