= Gunnar Strømvad =

Danish actor (1908–1972)

- Born: 12 May 1908; Odense, Denmark
- Died: 6 December 1972 (aged 64); Sundby, Denmark
- Occupation: Actor
- Years active: 1940–1971

Gunnar Strømvad (12 May 1908 – 6 December 1972) was a Danish film actor. He appeared in 34 films between 1940 and 1971.

== Filmography ==
- Den forsvundne fuldmægtig (1971)
- Olsen-banden i Jylland (1971)
- Ballade på Christianshavn (1971)
- Rend mig i revolutionen (1970)
- Ta' lidt solskin (1969)
- Klabautermannen (1969)
- Farlig sommer (1969)
- Stine og drengene (1969)
- Romulus den store (1969)
- Olsen-banden (1968)
- Krybskytterne på Næsbygård (1966)
- Slap af, Frede! (1966)
- Strike First Freddy (1965)
- Don Olsen kommer til byen (1964)
- Tine (1964)
- Døden kommer til middag (1964)
- Støv for alle pengene (1963)
- Bussen (1963)
- Pigen og pressefotografen (1963)
- Det tossede paradis (1962)
- Sorte Shara (1961)
- To skøre ho'der (1961)
- Skibet er ladet med (1960)
- Den sidste vinter (1960)
- Tro, håb og trolddom (1960)
- Pigen i søgelyset (1959)
- Karen, Maren og Mette (1954)
- Jan går til filmen (1954)
- Kongeligt besøg (1954)
- Nålen (1951)
- For frihed og ret (1949)
- Kampen mod uretten (1949)
- Natekspressen P903 (1942)
- Jens Langkniv (1940)
