= Revolution My A =

1970 film

- Directed by: Erik Balling
- Written by: Henning Bahs; Erik Balling
- Produced by: Bo Christensen
- Starring: Ove Sprogøe
- Cinematography: Jørgen Skov
- Edited by: Ole Steen Nielsen
- Distributed by: Nordisk Film
- Release date: 9 October 1970
- Running time: 90 minutes
- Country: Denmark
- Language: Danish

Revolution My A (Danish: Rend mig i revolutionen) is a 1970 Danish film directed by Erik Balling and starring Ove Sprogøe.

== Cast ==
- Ove Sprogøe - Arthur Antonsen
- Poul Bundgaard - Præsident Jesus Maria Salvadore
- Helle Virkner - Frk. Nyborg
- Helle Hertz - Eva
- Poul Reichhardt - Efterretningschef
- Gotha Andersen - Portier Kubolsky
- Carl Duering - Major Bodenschatz
- Else-Marie - Fru Johansen
- Ejner Federspiel - Taxachauffør
- Poul Glargaard - Galan
- Paul Hagen - Grønthandler
- Caja Heimann
- Lise Henningsen - Bartender
- Knud Hilding - Overbetjent
- Valsø Holm - Hoteldirektør Ludvigsen
- Svend Erik Jensen - Guteraguaner
- Preben Kaas - Gonzales
- Hans Kristensen - Mand, hvis bil bliver ødelagt
- Jesper Langberg - Værnepligtig
- Thorkil Lauritzen - Arrestforvarer Hansen
- Gunnar Lemvigh - Kriminalassistent
- Ernst Meyer - Pakkebudet
- Ole Monty - Overbetjent i arrest
- Kate Mundt
- Georg Nielsen - Guteraguaner
- Kjeld Noack - Guteraguaner
- Bjørn Puggaard-Müller - Diplomat
- André Sallyman - Guteraguaner
- Kirsten Sloth
- Peter Steen - Diplomat
- Gunnar Strømvad - Guteraguaner
- Elga Olga Svendsen
- Poul Thomsen - Luftmarskal
