= Jens Langkniv =

1940 film

- Directed by: Per Knutzon; Peter Lind
- Written by: Theodor Christensen; Karl Roos; Mogens Skot-Hansen
- Produced by: Helge Drescher
- Starring: Poul Reichhardt
- Edited by: Eskild Jensen
- Release date: 5 February 1940
- Running time: 92 minutes
- Country: Denmark
- Language: Danish

Jens Langkniv is a 1940 Danish film directed by Per Knutzon and Peter Lind and starring Poul Reichhardt.

== Cast ==
- Asbjørn Andersen
- Valborg Bagger
- Grete Bendix
- Kirsten Elsass
- Ejner Federspiel
- Aage Foss
- Karl Goos
- Bjarne Henning-Jensen
- Harald Holst
- Einar Juhl
- Valdemar Lund - Vicar Philip
- Poul Reichhardt - Jens Langkniv
- Valdemar Skjerning
- Helmuth Strøm
- Gunnar Strømvad
