= En ganske almindelig pige =

1940 film

- Promotional poster
- Directed by: Lau Lauritzen Jr. Alice O'Fredericks
- Written by: Børge Müller
- Starring: Lau Lauritzen Jr.
- Cinematography: Rudolf Frederiksen
- Edited by: Marie Ejlersen
- Release date: 26 December 1940
- Running time: 99 minutes
- Country: Denmark
- Language: Danish

En ganske almindelig pige is a 1940 Danish family film directed by Lau Lauritzen Jr. and Alice O'Fredericks.

== Cast ==
- Lau Lauritzen Jr. as Filmjournalist Poul Hansen
- Ib Schønberg as Kriminalreporter Lassen
- Sigrid Horne-Rasmussen as Redaktør Frederikke
- Bodil Kjer as Tove Jørgensen
- Gerda Neumann as Grete
- Clara Østø as Frk. Stjerneborg
- Ulrik Neumann as Grete's bror Peter
- Helge Kjærulff-Schmidt as Bogholder Thomsen
- Gunnar Lauring as Filminstruktør Højer
- Jon Iversen as Direktør for 'Bio Film'
- Tut Kragh as Skuespillerinde Else Lund
- Helga Frier asLassens tante
