= Vi arme syndere =

1952 film

- Film poster
- Directed by: Erik Balling; Ole Palsbo
- Written by: Fleming Lynge; Sigfrid Siwertz
- Produced by: John Hilbert
- Starring: Ib Schønberg
- Cinematography: Verner Jensen; Poul Pedersen; Jørgen Skov; Arthur J. Ornitz
- Edited by: John Hilbard
- Distributed by: Nordisk Film
- Release date: 1952
- Running time: 105 minutes
- Country: Denmark
- Language: Danish

Vi arme syndere (Us Petty Sinners) is a 1952 Danish comedy film directed by Erik Balling and Ole Palsbo. A statuette by a famous sculptor, a draft of burnt clay, plays a significant role in this film. It is based on a short story by Sigfrid Siwertz.

== Cast ==
- Ib Schønberg as Hannibal Svane
- Johannes Meyer as Gulbæk
- Ellen Gottschalch as Baronessen
- Astrid Villaume as Ulla Blom
- Bendt Rothe as Maler Astrup
- Gunnar Lauring as Kurt Lönning
- Freddy Koch as Baron Willy von Ehrenburg
- Knud Heglund as Truelsen
- Minna Jørgensen as Fru. Riise
- Berit Erbe as Tove
- Lise Ringheim as Jenny
- Per Buckhøj
- Einar Juhl
- Thorkil Lauritzen
- Henry Nielsen
- Karl Stegger
- Keld Markuslund
- Alma Olander Dam Willumsen (as Olander Dam Willumsen)
- Dirch Passer
