= Det gælder os alle =

1949 film

- Film poster
- Directed by: Alice O'Fredericks
- Written by: Svend Rindom
- Produced by: Svend Nielsen
- Starring: Poul Reichhardt
- Cinematography: Einar Olsen
- Edited by: Edith Schlüssel
- Music by: Sven Gyldmark
- Release date: 16 February 1949
- Running time: 94 minutes
- Country: Denmark
- Language: Danish

Det gælder os alle is a 1949 Danish drama film directed by Alice O'Fredericks.

== Cast ==
- Poul Reichhardt as Jørgen Vedel
- Lisbeth Movin as Edith
- Ib Schønberg as Direktør Lassen
- Agnes Rehni as Fru Lassen
- Lily Broberg as Karen
- Ilselil Larsen as Leni Rosner
- Preben Lerdorff Rye as Chauffør Olsen
- Preben Mahrt as Kurt
- Helga Frier as Grethe
- Tom Rindom Thomsen - Hugo
- Grete Bendix as Søster Erika
- Signi Grenness as Anna
- Karen Meyer as Ninas mor
- Per Buckhøj
- Alma Olander Dam Willumsen as Fru Gormsen
- Sigurd Langberg
- Bente Hansen as Tove
- Wenche Klouman as Gerd
