= Edith Schlüssel =

Danish film editor

- Born: 11 February 1899
- Died: 14 September 1981 (aged 82)
- Occupation: Film editor
- Years active: 1934–1972

Edith Schlüssel was a Danish film editor active from 1934 to 1972. She often worked with director Carl Theodor Dreyer.

== Selected filmography ==
- Bedroom Mazurka (1970)
- Eric Soya's '17' (1965)
- Gertrud (1964)
- Tre må man være (1959)
- The Man Who Couldn't Say No (1958)
- Soldaterkammerater (1958)
- Sønnen fra Amerika (1957)
- Ordet (1955)
- Det gælder livet (1953)
- Min søn Peter (1953)
- Hejrenæs (1953)
- Dorte (1951)
- I gabestokken (1950)
- Det gælder os alle (1949)
- Lucky Journey (1947)
- My Name Is Petersen (1947)
- Letter from the Dead (1946)
- The Invisible Army (1945)
- Mens sagføreren sover (1945)
- Otte akkorder (1944)
- Day of Wrath (1943)
- Peter Andersen (1941)
- Panserbasse (1936)
- Snushanerne (1936)
- Week-end (1935)
- Kidnapped (1935)
- Ud i den kolde sne (1934)
