= Aage Foss =

Danish actor

- Born: 18 May 1885; Aarhus, Denmark
- Died: 8 February 1952 (aged 66)
- Occupation: Actor
- Years active: 1933-1951

Aage Foss (18 May 1885, Aarhus, Denmark – 8 February 1952) was a Danish film actor. He appeared in 29 films between 1933 and 1951.

== Selected filmography ==
- Flight from the Millions (1934)
- København, Kalundborg og - ? (1934)
- The Golden Smile (1935)
- Jens Langkniv (1940)
- The Invisible Army (1945)
- Mosekongen (1950)
- Frihed forpligter (1951)
