= Elly Petersen =

1944 film

- DVD cover
- Directed by: Jon Iversen; Alice O'Fredericks
- Written by: Leck Fischer; Mogens Klitgaard
- Produced by: Henning Karmark
- Starring: Bodil Kjer
- Cinematography: Rudolf Frederiksen
- Edited by: Marie Ejlersen
- Music by: Sven Gyldmark
- Release date: 7 August 1944
- Running time: 100 minutes
- Country: Denmark
- Language: Danish

Elly Petersen is a 1944 Danish drama film directed by Jon Iversen and Alice O'Fredericks.

== Cast ==
- Bodil Kjer as Elly Petersen
- Poul Reichhardt as Hjalmer
- Lilian Ellis as Nina
- Karl Gustav Ahlefeldt as Leif Faber
- Grethe Holmer as Lise Faber
- Betty Helsengreen as Agnes
- Irwin Hasselmann as Lauritsen
- Ib Schønberg as Hjalmars far
- Valdemar Skjerning
