= Det stod i avisen =

1962 film

- Directed by: Peer Guldbrandsen
- Written by: Peer Guldbrandsen
- Produced by: Peer Guldbrandsen
- Starring: Henning Moritzen
- Cinematography: Karl Andersson
- Edited by: Jon Branner
- Music by: Sven Gyldmark
- Production company: Saga Studios
- Release date: 25 September 1962
- Running time: 96 minutes
- Country: Denmark
- Language: Danish

Det stod i avisen is a 1962 Danish family film directed by Peer Guldbrandsen and starring Henning Moritzen.

== Cast ==
- Henning Moritzen as Johan Jespersen
- Hanne Borchsenius as Kitty
- Susse Wold as Johans fiancée
- Ebbe Langberg as Søren
- Asbjørn Andersen as Man who has a 19th wedding anniversary
- Karin Nellemose as Woman who rents room to Søren
- Ove Sprogøe as Læge S. Gregersen
- Astrid Villaume as Grete Gregersen
- Axel Strøbye as Peter
- Poul Reichhardt as Ingrids fiancé
- Lily Broberg as Ingrid
- Ebbe Rode as Poul
- Berthe Qvistgaard as Pouls wife
- Tove Maës as Woman with pram for sale
- Karen Lykkehus as Wife who has a 19th wedding anniversary
- Johannes Meyer as The Director
- Peer Guldbrandsen as Narrator (voice) (uncredited)
