= Gunnar Lemvigh =

Danish actor (1909–1979)

- Born: 28 March 1909; Copenhagen, Denmark
- Died: 16 November 1979 (aged 70); Hellerup, Denmark
- Occupation: Actor
- Years active: 1939–1977

Gunnar Lemvigh (28 March 1909 – 16 November 1979) was a Danish film actor. He appeared in 52 films between 1939 and 1977.

== Filmography ==
- Familien Gyldenkål vinder valget (1977)
- Agent 69 Jensen i Skorpionens tegn (1977)
- Slap af (1973)
- Her bor de gale (1973)
- Manden på Svanegården (1972)
- Takt og tone i himmelsengen (1972)
- Kommunisten (1971)
- The Only Way (1970)
- Rend mig i revolutionen (1970)
- Tango jalousi (1970)
- Mig og min lillebror og Bølle (1969)
- Ta' lidt solskin (1969)
- Farlig sommer (1969)
- Romulus den store (1969)
- Mig og min lillebror og storsmuglerne (1968)
- Far laver sovsen (1967)
- Brødrene på Uglegaarden (1967)
- Min søsters børn på bryllupsrejse (1967)
- Smukke-Arne og Rosa (1967)
- Det er ikke appelsiner, det er heste (1967)
- Min søsters børn (1966)
- Nu stiger den (1966)
- Dyden går amok (1966)
- I brændingen (1965)
- Mille, Marie og mig. Eller Giselle eller? (1965)
- En ven i bolignøden (1965)
- Don Olsen kommer til byen (1964)
- Fem mand og Rosa (1964)
- Mord for åbent tæppe (1964)
- The Keeler Affair (1963)
- Bussen (1963)
- Venus fra Vestø (1962)
- Det støver stadig (1962)
- Det tossede paradis (1962)
- Far til fire med fuld musik (1961)
- Gøngehøvdingen (1961)
- Støv på hjernen (1961)
- Min kone fra Paris (1961)
- Ullabella (1961)
- Ud med post (1961)
- Lyssky transport gennem Danmark (1958)
- Fra den gamle Købmandsgaard (1951)
- Kampen mod uretten (1949)
- Næste gang er det dig (1948)
- Kristinus Bergman (1948)
- Far betaler (1946)
- Billet mrk. (1946)
- Mens sagføreren sover (1945)
- Mine kære koner (1943)
- Erik Ejegods pilgrimsfærd (1943)
- I de gode, gamle dage (1940)
- En lille tilfældighed (1939)
