= Kampen om Næsbygård =

1964 film

- Directed by: Ib Mossin; Alice O'Fredericks
- Written by: Morten Korch; Ib Mossin; Alice O'Fredericks
- Produced by: Finn Aabye; Just Betzer; Henning Karmark
- Starring: Asbjørn Andersen
- Cinematography: Rudolf Frederiksen; Henning Kristiansen
- Edited by: Lars Brydesen
- Music by: Sven Gyldmark
- Distributed by: ASA Film
- Release date: 18 December 1964
- Running time: 108 minutes
- Country: Denmark
- Language: Danish

Kampen om Næsbygård is a 1964 Danish family film directed by Ib Mossin and Alice O'Fredericks.

== Cast ==
- Asbjørn Andersen as Godsejer Martin
- Karen Berg as Helene
- Ole Wisborg as Torben
- Poul Reichhardt as Præsten Prip
- Inger Stender as Præstekonen Anna
- Agnes Rehni as Tante Thyra
- Ib Mossin as Anker
- Jane Thomsen as Præstedatteren Rosa
- Ole Neumann as Martin Jr.
- Helga Frier as Kokkepigen Marie
- Marie-Louise Coninck as Stuepigen Erna
- Einar Juhl as Sagføreren
- Knud Schrøder as Bookmaker
- Holger Vistisen as Bookmaker
- Yvonne Ekmann as Torben's kæreste
- Palle Huld as Lægen
- Peter Malberg as Gartneren Ole
- Christian Arhoff as Gartneren Nick
- Gunnar Hansen as TV reporter
