= Hvad vil De ha'? =

1956 film

- Directed by: Jens Henriksen; Preben Neergaard
- Written by: Tao Michaëlis; Arvid Müller; Børge Müller
- Produced by: Aage Stentoft
- Starring: Dirch Passer
- Edited by: Henning Bendtsen
- Distributed by: ASA Film
- Release date: 23 January 1956
- Running time: 79 minutes
- Country: Denmark
- Language: Danish

Hvad vil De ha'? (English: What do you want?) is a 1956 Danish comedy film directed by Jens Henriksen and Preben Neergaard and starring Dirch Passer.

== Cast ==
- Asbjørn Andersen as Filmproducenten
- Boyd Bachmann as himself
- Paul Hagen as Soldaten
- Hans Kurt as Vagabonden
- Buster Larsen as Motorcykelbud
- Preben Mahrt as Madsen
- Louis Miehe-Renard as Sømanden
- Ole Monty asPatient
- Preben Neergaard as Instruktøren
- Henry Nielsen as Fuld mand
- Dirch Passer as Jansen
- Kjeld Petersen as Kjeldsen
- Preben Lerdorff Rye as Sømand
- Ove Sprogøe as Gæst der snakker for meget
- Henrik Wiehe as Kunde
- Sigrid Horne-Rasmussen as Fru Hansen
- Birgitte Reimer as Hustru der spiller tjenestepige
- Jessie Rindom as Kvinde der anråber politiet
- Bodil Steen as Kvinde på besøg på hospital
- Marguerite Viby as Klara
- Jørgen Beck as Scenemester
- Max Hansen
- Grete Frische as Fru. Imelin
