= This Is Life (film) =

1953 film

- Directed by: Jon Iversen
- Written by: Ib Freuchen
- Starring: Poul Müller; Lisbeth Movin; Elsebet Knudsen
- Cinematography: Henning Bendtsen; Einar Olsen
- Edited by: Edith Schlüssel
- Music by: Svend Erik Tarp
- Production company: Palladium
- Release date: 21 December 1953
- Running time: 97 minutes
- Country: Denmark
- Language: Danish

This Is Life (Danish: Det gælder livet) is a 1953 Danish film directed by Jon Iversen and starring Poul Müller, Lisbeth Movin and Elsebet Knudsen.

== Cast ==
- Poul Müller as Arkitekt Olaf Henningsen
- Lisbeth Movin as Ella Henningsen
- Elsebet Knudsen as Lotte Henningsen
- Hans Kurt as Fabrikant Viggo Thomsen
- Signi Grenness as Polly Thomsen
- Henning Moritzen as Sanglærer Stefan Korsby
- Henrik Wiehe as Kurt Rosing
- Preben Uglebjerg as Kurts ven
- Kjeld Jacobsen as Henningsens læge
- Tavs Neiiendam as Rektor
- Johannes Meyer as Vagtmester Madsen
- Ove Rud as Hospitalslæge
- Axel Strøbye as Mekaniker
- Povl Wøldike as Tilskuer ved jubilæumsfest
- Peter Kitter as Journalist

== Bibliography ==
- Morten Piil. Gyldendals danske filmguide. Gyldendal A/S, 2008.
