= Helga Frier =

Danish actress (1893–1972)

- Born: 12 June 1893; Aarhus, Denmark
- Died: 9 January 1972 (aged 78); Gentofte, Denmark

Helga Frier (12 June 1893 – 9 January 1972) was a Danish actress.

She debuted in 1914 in the Den jyske Folkescene.

== Filmography ==
- Odds 777 - 1932
- De blaa drenge - 1933
- Rasmines bryllup - 1935
- Sjette trækning - 1936
- Champagnegaloppen - 1938
- En pige med pep - 1940
- Barnet - 1940
- I de gode gamle dage - 1940
- En ganske almindelig pige - 1940
- Gå med mig hjem - 1941
- Wienerbarnet - 1941
- Alle mand på dæk - 1942
- Når bønder elsker - 1942
- Møllen - 1943
- Ungdommens rus - 1943
- De tre skolekammerater - 1944
- Biskoppen - 1944
- Mordets melodi - 1944
- Teatertosset - 1944
- Frihed, lighed og Louise - 1944
- Jeg elsker en anden - 1946
- Hans store aften - 1946
- Det gælder os alle - 1949
- Lejlighed til leje - 1949
- Min kone er uskyldig - 1950
- Mosekongen - 1950
- Frihed forpligter - 1951
- Fra den gamle købmandsgård - 1951
- Fodboldpræsten - 1951
- Husmandstøsen - 1952
- Det store løb - 1952
- Fløjtespilleren - 1953
- Min søn Peter - 1953
- Flintesønnerne - 1956
- Den kloge mand (1956) - 1956
- Sønnen fra Amerika - 1957
- Vagabonderne på Bakkegården - 1958
- Poeten og Lillemor - 1959
- Det skete på Møllegården - 1960
- Den rige enke - 1962
- Kampen om Næsbygaard - 1964
- Næsbygaards arving - 1965
- Krybskytterne på Næsbygaard - 1966
