= Ejner Federspiel =

Danish actor

- Born: 12 August 1896; Aarhus, Denmark
- Died: 21 November 1981 (aged 85); Denmark
- Occupation: Actor
- Years active: 1934–1981

Ejner Federspiel (12 August 1896 – 21 November 1981) was a Danish film actor. He appeared in 58 films between 1934 and 1981. He was married to Gunver Fønss and his daughter was actress Birgitte Federspiel.

== Partial filmography ==
- Hr. Tell og Søn (1930)
- 7-9-13 (1934) – Dommer
- København, Kalundborg og – ? (1934) – Radiodirektør
- Jens Langkniv (1940) – Wolle Greiersen
- Familien Olsen (1940) – Nævningeleder
- Niels Pind og hans dreng (1941) – Ingeniør
- Tordenskjold går i land (1942)
- Søren Søndervold (1942) – Dommerfuldmægtig
- Forellen (1942) – Bibliotekar Konrad Isberg
- Alle mand paa dæk (1942) – Kontorchef Hansen
- Naar bønder elsker (1942) – Povl Hedemark
- Møllen (1943) – Smidt, pastoren
- Kriminalassistent Bloch (1943) – Carl Frank
- Jeg mødte en morder (1943) – Dr. Hennings
- De tre skolekammerater (1944) – Dommer Eyvind Carstens
- I gaar og i morgen (1945) – Civilingeniør Ove Humlegaard
- Hans store aften (1946) – Indehaver af lånekontor
- The Swedenhielm Family (1947) – Nielsen
- For frihed og ret (1949) – Christoffer Rasmussen
- The Red Horses (1950) – Anders Munk
- Min kone er uskyldig (1950) – Mand der ser på lejlighed
- Vesterhavsdrenge (1950) – Kræ Brejning
- Familien Schmidt (1951) – Pastoren
- Vejrhanen (1952) – Rektoren
- Vores lille by (1954) – Pastoren
- Ordet (1955) – Peter Petersen (uncredited)
- Seksdagesløbet (1958) – Tilskuer
- Harry and the Butler (1961) – Herskabstjener II
- The Counterfeit Traitor (1962) – Prof. Christiansen (uncredited)
- Den kære familie (1962) – Thomsen
- Der brænder en ild (1962) – Nisted
- Tine (1964) – Dr. Fangel
- Fem mand og Rosa (1964) – Pastoren
- Don Olsen kommer til byen (1964) – Borgmester
- Story of Barbara (1967) – Barbara's Father
- Brødrene på Uglegaarden (1967) – Christian Thorup
- The Olsen Gang (1968) – Konduktør
- Tænk på et tal (1969) – Borcks far
- The Man Who Thought Life (1969) – Butleren
- Revolution My A (1970) – Taxachauffør
- The Only Way (1970) – Arresteret jøde / Arrested Jew
- Og så er der bal bagefter (1970) – Aage
- Christa (1971) – Consul Andersen
- Præsten i Vejlby (1972) – Hyrde
- The Olsen Gang Goes Crazy (1973) – Købmand Quist
- The Olsen Gang Sees Red (1976) – Joachim
- The Moelleby Affair (1976) – Assessor Godtfredsen
- The Olsen Gang Outta Sigh (1977) – Vagtmand
- Familien Gyldenkål vinder valget (1977)
- The Olsen Gang Goes to War (1978) – Nattevagt
- Rend mig i traditionerne (1979) – Jørgensen, patient
- The Olsen Gang Never Surrenders (1979) – Vagt
- Langturschauffør (1981) – Hans' far (final film role)
