= Min kone er uskyldig =

1950 film

- Directed by: Johan Jacobsen
- Written by: Arvid Müller
- Starring: Poul Reichhardt
- Cinematography: Karl Andersson; Rudolf Frederiksen
- Edited by: Marie Ejlersen
- Release date: 20 February 1950
- Running time: 94 minutes
- Country: Denmark
- Language: Danish

Min kone er uskyldig (My Wife is Innocent) is a 1950 Danish comedy film directed by Johan Jacobsen and starring Poul Reichhardt.

== Cast ==
- Poul Reichhardt as Architect Frederik Lund / Claus Lund
- Bodil Kjer as Betty Lund
- Gunnar Lauring as Landsretssagfører Herbert Thomsen
- Vera Gebuhr as Maid at Lund
- Louis Miehe-Renard as Tank attendant
- Preben Mahrt as Lise Born's fiancé
- Svend Bille as Director
- Knud Heglund as Director
- Henry Nielsen as Man looking for apartment
- Ejner Federspiel as Man looking for apartment
- Karin Nellemose as Lise Born
- Helga Frier as Passenger on a train
- Carl Struve as Guest at hotel in Norway
- Sossen Krohg as Guest at hotel in Norway
- Aage Winther-Jørgensen as Detective
- Nils Reinhardt Christensen
- Bjarne Forchhammer
