= Dorte =

1951 film

- Directed by: Jon Iversen
- Written by: Peer Guldbrandsen
- Starring: Ilselil Larsen
- Cinematography: Ib Dam; Einar Olsen
- Edited by: Edith Schlüssel
- Music by: Sven Gyldmark
- Release date: 17 December 1951
- Running time: 94 minutes
- Country: Denmark
- Language: Danish

Dorte is a 1951 Danish family film directed by Jon Iversen. The 94-minute film is about a young girl who arrives in Copenhagen by train from Glamsberg on Fyn. She has never been to the city before.

== Cast ==
- Ilselil Larsen as Dorte
- Ib Schønberg as Director Asger Hansen
- Preben Neergaard as Steen
- Nina Pens Rode as Margot
- Johannes Meyer as Prokuristen
- Helge Kjærulff-Schmidt as Olsen
- Sigurd Langberg as Director Herbert Christoffersen
- Ove Sprogøe as Hr. Smith
- Maria Garland as Card player at Hansen
- Katy Valentin as Birthe Hansen
- Henning Moritzen - Doctor Sørensen
- Birthe Illum as Steen's friend - Kitty
- Else Jarlbak as Fru Sedenius
- Christen Møller as Police Commissioner
- Henry Nielsen as Porter
- Poul Müller as Card player at Hansen
- Dirch Passer as American
- Ellen Margrethe Stein as Guest at the party
- Ego Brønnum-Jacobsen as Dorte's bridgelære
- Inge Ketti as Office Lady
- Bjørn Puggaard-Müller as Cook's friend
- Signi Grenness as Secretary
- Sven Gyldmark as Pianist (uncredited)
