= Alarm (1938 film) =

1938 film

- Front cover of the Danish DVD
- Directed by: Lau Lauritzen Jr. Alice O'Fredericks
- Written by: Lau Lauritzen Jr. Børge Müller; Alice O'Fredericks
- Produced by: Henning Karmark
- Starring: Lau Lauritzen Jr.
- Cinematography: Karl Andersson
- Edited by: Marie Ejlersen
- Release date: 21 February 1938
- Running time: 104 minutes
- Country: Denmark
- Language: Danish

Alarm is a 1938 Danish family film directed by Lau Lauritzen Jr. and Alice O'Fredericks.

== Cast ==
- Lau Lauritzen Jr. as Jess Clark
- Betty Söderberg as Gerda Clark
- Victor Borge as Tjener Cæsar ... credited as Børge Rosenbaum, but on later DVD cover as Victor Borge
- Johannes Meyer as Fabrikant Schmidt
- Victor Montell as Assistant hos Smith
- Karen Jønsson as Pressefotograf
- Hans Egede Budtz as Direktør for Falck Redningskorps
- Poul Reichhardt as Falckmand Petersen
- Paul Rohde as Sagfører Skov
- Sigurd Langberg as En vagabond
- Thorkil Lauritzen as En falckmand
