= Ellen Jansø =

Danish actress (1907–1981)

- Born: 2 July 1907; Denmark
- Died: 30 December 1981 (aged 74); Denmark
- Occupation: Actress
- Years active: 1933-1951

Ellen Jansø (2 July 1907 – 30 December 1981) was a Danish film actress. She appeared in twelve films between 1933 and 1951.

She was born and died in Denmark.

== Selected filmography ==
- Ud i den kolde sne (1934)
- Count Svensson (1951)
- Bag de røde porte (1951)
- Sommerglæder (1940)
- Familien Olsen (1940)
- Flådens blå matroser (1937)
- Inkognito (1937)
- Panserbasse (1936)
- Week-end (1935)
- Barken Margrethe (1934)
- København, Kalundborg og - ? (1934)
- Ud i den kolde sne (1934)
- Københavnere (1933)
