= Hans Egede Budtz =

Danish actor (1889–1968)

- Born: 8 August 1889; Slagelse, Denmark
- Died: 29 June 1968 (aged 78); Frederiksberg, Denmark
- Occupation: Actor
- Years active: 1910–1961

Hans Egede Budtz (8 August 1889 – 29 June 1968) was a Danish stage and film actor.

== Early life and education ==
Born in Slagelse, Zealand, he was the son of Carl Budtz and Alvida Marie Budtz (née Svendsen). He studied at the Sorø Academy and then at the Royal Danish Theatre from 1913 to 1915 under Thorkild Roose. He made his debut at the Royal Theatre on 15 May 1915 as Klint in a production of Christian Hostrup's comedy Genboerne.

== Career ==
Budtz was an actor in residence at the Royal Theatre from 1913 to 1918, then from 1919 to 1927 at the Det Ny Teater in Copenhagen. From 1927 to 1929, he was an actor as well as stage director at the Odense Theatre before moving on to the Folketeatret from 1929 to 1933, the Casino Theatre from 1936 to 1937, the Folketeatret once again, the Nørrebro Theatre and the National Scala. For his role in the arts, he was made a Knight of the Order of Dannebrog.

While still involved with the theatre, Budtz would also pursue a career in film. His first known film was a 1916 Jens Trap Walther-directed silent dramatic short titled Marodør (English: Marauder). He would go on to appear in approximately twenty films in a film career that spanned over forty years. His last studio film appearance was in the 1955 Sven Methling-directed drama Der kom en dag, which won a Bodil Award for Best Danish Film. He would make one final appearance in a Danish television film titled Ødipus, directed by Edvin Tiemroth and released in 1961, before retiring from acting.

== Personal life ==
Hans Egede Budtz was married to Maja Emilie Rasmussen on 3 May 1913 at the Frederiksberg Church. The marriage produced three children: Poul Egede Budtz, Eda Budtz and Anne Budtz. The couple would divorce in 1927, and the same year he would marry actress Thora Lubich at Taarbæk Church. The union was dissolved in 1935 and on 2 January 1947, he married actress Alice Schlütter at Gentofte Municipality Hall. The couple would remain married until his death. Budtz was buried at Sct. Mikkels Kirkegård in his hometown of Slagelse.

== Selected filmography ==
- Der kom en dag (1955)
- Fløjtespilleren (1953)
- Kampen mod uretten (1949)
- En pige uden lige (1943)
- I dag begynder livet (1939)
- Alarm (1938)
- Nøddebo Præstegård (1934)
