= Jørn Jeppesen =

Danish actor (1919–1964)

- Born: 21 April 1919; Frederiksberg, Denmark
- Died: 18 January 1964 (aged 44)

Jørn Jeppesen (21 April 1919 – 18 January 1964) was a Danish stage and film actor.

== Filmography ==
- Genboerne - 1939
- Når bønder elsker - 1942
- Natekspressen (P. 903) - 1942
- Møllen - 1943
- Guds mærkelige veje - 1944
- De tre skolekammerater - 1944
- Spurve under taget - 1944
- En ny dag gryer - 1945
- Så mødes vi hos Tove - 1946
- Sikken en nat - 1947
- Historien om Hjortholm - 1950
- Café Paradis - 1950
- Smedestræde 4 - 1950
- Mosekongen - 1950
- De røde heste - 1950
- Det gamle guld - 1951
- Nålen - 1951
- Det sande ansigt - 1951
- Husmandstøsen - 1952
- Vejrhanen - 1952
- En sømand går i land - 1954
- Himlen er blå - 1954
- Vores lille by - 1954
- Altid ballade - 1955
- Blændværk - 1955
- Den kloge mand (1956) - 1956
- Ung leg - 1956
- En kvinde er overflødig - 1957
- Bundfald - 1957
- Skovridergården - 1957
- Guld og grønne skove - 1958
- Seksdagesløbet - 1958
- Spion 503 - 1958
- Det skete på Møllegården - 1960
- Eventyrrejsen - 1960
- Eventyr på Mallorca - 1961
- Gøngehøvdingen - 1961
- Der brænder en ild - 1962
