= Axel Frische =

Danish screenwriter

- Born: 15 March 1877; Tjele Parish, near Viborg, Denmark
- Died: 2 February 1956 (aged 78); Denmark
- Occupations: Screenwriter; Actor; Film director
- Years active: 1914-1956

Axel Frische (15 March 1877 – 2 February 1956) was a Danish screenwriter, actor and film director. He wrote for 23 films between 1914 and 1956. He also appeared in 18 films between 1932 and 1950. He was born and died in Denmark.

== Selected filmography ==
- The Price of Betrayal (1915)
- Odds 777 (1932)
- Life on the Hegn Farm (1938)
- Blaavand melder storm (1938)
- Familien Olsen (1940)
- Far skal giftes (1941 - writer)
- Moster fra Mols (1943 - writer and director)
- Letter from the Dead (1946)
- We Meet at Tove's (1946)
- The Viking Watch of the Danish Seaman (1948)
- Mosekongen (1950)
