= Husmandstøsen =

1952 film

- Film poster
- Directed by: Alice O'Fredericks
- Written by: Selma Lagerlöf; Thomas Olesen Løkken
- Based on: The Girl from the Marsh Croft by Selma Lagerlöf
- Produced by: Henning Karmark
- Starring: Grethe Thordahl
- Cinematography: Rudolf Frederiksen
- Edited by: Wera Iwanouw
- Music by: Sven Gyldmark
- Production company: ASA Film
- Release date: 22 September 1952
- Running time: 102 minutes
- Country: Denmark
- Language: Danish

Husmandstøsen is a 1952 Danish family film directed by Alice O'Fredericks. It is based on the 1908 novella The Girl from the Marsh Croft by Nobel Prize winning Swedish author Selma Lagerlöf.

== Plot ==
In the windswept heathland around 1900, the poor Helga leaves her home to work on a farm. Here she is seduced by the gentleman and becomes pregnant with his child. He refuses to acknowledge paternity. Expelled from the local community, Helga now has to fight alone to stay alive. In times of need, she gets a place at Torpegård, where Gudmund lives with his old mother. His fiancé, however, is anything but enthusiastic about Helga's presence.

== Cast ==
- Grethe Thordahl as Helga
- Ib Schønberg as Sorte Niels
- Maria Garland as Helgas mor Birthe
- Jakob Nielsen as Helgas far Karl
- Johannes Meyer as Søren Torpegaard
- Helga Frier as Ingeborg Torpegaard
- Poul Reichhardt as Gudmund Torpegaard
- Sigurd Langberg as Lars Storgaard
- Ebba Thoman as Maria Storgaard
- Nina Pens Rode as Hildur Storgaard
- Ernst Bruun Olsen as Johan Storgaard
- Jørn Jeppesen as Per Mortensen
- Signi Grenness as Jensine Mortensen
- Svend Methling as Herredsfogeden
- Einar Juhl as Herredsfogedens fuldmægtig
- Lily Broberg as Marie
- Else Jarlbak as Karen
- Carl Heger as Politibetjent
- Henry Jessen as En gårdskarl
- Niels Moltzen as En gårdskarl
