= Ellen Gottschalch =

Danish actress (1894–1981)

- Born: 2 May 1894; Asaa, Brønderslev Municipality, Denmark
- Died: 17 February 1981 (aged 86); Frederiksberg, Denmark
- Years active: 1932–1972

Ellen Sofie Kathrine Gottschalch (2 May 1894 – 17 February 1981), was a Danish stage and film actress.

She worked in the Arhus Theatre in 1911 then the Det Ny Theater in Copenhagen from 1912 to 1928. She entered film in 1938. She was employed at the Royal Danish Theatre from 1941 to 1961 where she among roles played in Death of a Salesman and Mor Karen in Elverhøj by Johan Ludvig Heiberg.

She was married to Christian Viggo Gottschalch 1915–1930 and later lived with the composer Kai Normann Andersen from 1932 to 1967. She died in 1981 and was buried at the Frederiksberg Ældre Kirkegård.

== Filmography ==
- Champagnegaloppen – 1938
- En desertør – 1940
- Jeg har elsket og levet – 1940
- Sommerglæder – 1940
- Far skal giftes – 1941
- En pige uden lige – 1943
- Erik Ejegods pilgrimsfærd – 1943
- Billet mrk. – 1946
- Ta', hvad du vil ha' – 1947
- Hvor er far? – 1948
- Berlingske Tidende – 1949
- Historien om Hjortholm – 1950
- Susanne – 1950
- Familien Schmidt – 1951
- Fra den gamle købmandsgård – 1951
- Mød mig på Cassiopeia – 1951
- Bag de røde porte – 1951
- Vi arme syndere – 1952
- Ta' Pelle med – 1952
- The Crime of Tove Andersen – 1953
- Tante Tut fra Paris – 1956
- Englen i sort – 1957
- Tre må man være – 1959
- Løgn og løvebrøl – 1961
- Lykkens musikanter – 1962
- Tine – 1964

== Awards ==
- Bodil Award for Best Supporting Actress, 1948
- Teaterpokalen, (English: The Teatre Trophy), 1949.
- Ingenio et Arti, 1950
- Tagea Brandts Rejselegat, 1951
