= Melody of Murder =

1944 film

The Melody of Murder
- Front Cover of the Danish DVD
- Directed by: Bodil Ipsen
- Written by: Fleming Lynge; Tavs Neiiendam (radio play)
- Starring: Gull-Maj Norin; Poul Reichhardt; Angelo Bruun; Ib Schønberg
- Cinematography: Valdemar Christensen
- Edited by: Valdemar Christensen
- Music by: Erik Fiehn
- Distributed by: Nordisk Film
- Release date: 1944
- Running time: 100 mins
- Country: Denmark
- Language: Danish

The Melody of Murder, (Original Title: Mordets Melodi), is a 1944 Danish suspense/horror film directed by Bodil Ipsen and starring Gull-Maj Norin and Poul Reichhardt.

== Plot ==
The dark tale revolves around a sexually ambiguous serial killer, whose crimes are committed to a French cabaret song. The police suspect a chanteuse who sings the same tune during her performances.

== Cast ==
- Gull-Maj Norin ... Cabaret Singer Odette Margot / Sonja
- Poul Reichhardt ... Emcee Max Stenberg
- Angelo Bruun ... Hypnotist Louis Valdini
- Peter Nielsen ... Detective Baunsø
- Else Petersen ... Mrs. Baunsø
- Karen Poulsen ... Wardrobe Lady Flora Kristiansen
- Ib Schønberg ... Theater Director Perm
- Petrine Sonne ... Landlady Sonja Bohman
- Charles Wilken ... Pensionist
- Anna Henriques-Nielsen ... Salesgirl Sonja Neie
- Lili Heglund ... Baker Lise Rasmussen
- Valsø Holm ...
- Per Buckhøj ...
- Helga Frier ... Cleaning Lady Nielsen
- Lis Løwert ... Maid Poula

== Reception ==
Produced during the German occupation of Denmark in World War II, the film was praised by critics for its "stylish cinematography, thematic intensity, and dark vision of Copenhagen;" and was considered one of the most influential Danish films of that period.
