= Helge Kjærulff-Schmidt =

Danish actor (1906–1982)

- Born: 22 February 1906; Nyborg, Denmark
- Died: 9 July 1982 (aged 76); Frederiksberg, Denmark

Helge Kjærulff-Schmidt (22 February 1906 – 9 July 1982) was a Danish stage and film actor. He was father to Palle Kjærulff-Schmidt.

== Filmography ==
- Komtessen på Stenholt – 1939
- En lille tilfældighed – 1939
- Sommerglæder – 1940
- En ganske almindelig pige – 1940
- Pas på svinget i Solby – 1940
- En forbryder – 1941
- En mand af betydning – 1941
- Far skal giftes – 1941
- Tante Cramers testamente – 1941
- Tobiasnætter – 1941
- Mine kære koner – 1943
- Bedstemor går amok – 1944
- Lev livet let – 1944
- Far betaler – 1946
- Op med lille Martha – 1946
- Sikken en nat – 1947
- Mens porten var lukket – 1948
- Den opvakte jomfru – 1950
- Dorte – 1951
- Fra den gamle købmandsgård – 1951
- Hold fingrene fra mor – 1951
- Vores fjerde far – 1951
- Kærlighedsdoktoren – 1952
- Vejrhanen – 1952
- Min søn Peter – 1953
- Sukceskomponisten – 1954
- På tro og love – 1955
- Mod og mandshjerte – 1955
- Bruden fra Dragstrup – 1955
- Tre piger fra Jylland – 1957
- Skovridergården – 1957
- Andre folks børn – 1958
- Det lille hotel – 1958
- Styrmand Karlsen – 1958
- Ballade på Bullerborg – 1959
- Paw – 1959
- De sjove år – 1959
- Gymnasiepigen – 1960
- Panik i paradis – 1960
- Den hvide hingst – 1961
- Landsbylægen – 1961
- Løgn og løvebrøl – 1961
- Poeten og Lillemor i forårshumør – 1961
- Landmandsliv – 1965
- Martha – 1967
- Brødrene på Uglegården – 1967
- Min søsters børn vælter byen – 1968
- De røde heste – 1968
- Mig og min lillebror og Bølle – 1969
- Ballade på Christianshavn – 1971
- Far til fire i højt humør – 1971
- Da Svante forsvandt – 1975
- Olsen-banden på sporet – 1975
- Den ubetænksomme elsker – 1982
