= Svend Rindom =

Danish screenwriter

- Born: 30 June 1884; Copenhagen, Denmark
- Died: 11 December 1960 (aged 76); Copenhagen, Denmark
- Occupations: screenwriter, actor
- Years active: 1911–1950

Svend Rindom (30 June 1884 – 11 December 1960) was a Danish screenwriter and film actor. He wrote for 36 films between 1911 and 1950 and appeared in approximately twelve films from 1912 to 1943.

He was born in Copenhagen and died in Copenhagen. His wife was actress Ellen Diedrich and his daughter was actress Jessie Rindom. He is buried in the Assistens Cemetery in Copenhagen.

== Selected filmography ==
- Master of the House (1925)
- 5 raske piger (1933)
- Life on the Hegn Farm (1938)
- Circus (1939)
- Familien Olsen (1940)
- Tyrannens fald (1942)
- Affæren Birte (1945)
- De kloge og vi gale (1945)
- Det gælder os alle (1949)
- Love Wins Out (1949)
- Mosekongen (1950)
