= Familien Olsen =

1940 film

- Directed by: Lau Lauritzen Jr. Alice O'Fredericks
- Written by: Oluf Bang; Fleming Lynge; Svend Rindom; Paul Sarauw
- Produced by: Henning Karmark
- Starring: Osvald Helmuth
- Cinematography: Karl Andersson
- Edited by: Marie Ejlersen
- Music by: Victor Cornelius
- Release date: 18 March 1940
- Running time: 91 minutes
- Country: Denmark
- Language: Danish

Familien Olsen is a 1940 Danish family film directed by Lau Lauritzen Jr. and Alice O'Fredericks.

== Cast ==
- Osvald Helmuth as Grønthandler Alfred Olsen
- Maria Garland as Christine Olsen
- Berthe Qvistgaard as Karen Olsen
- Karl Gustav Ahlefeldt as Willy Alfred Olsen
- Ib Schønberg as Gramstrup
- Axel Frische as Niels Sønderfeldt
- Sigfred Johansen as Hugo Sønderfeldt
- Jon Iversen as Statsadvokaten
- Ejner Federspiel as Nævningeleder
- Viggo Brodthagen as Simonsen
- Erika Voigt as Fru Andersen
- Arthur Jensen - Hr. Borck
- Ingeborg Pehrson as Hugos tante
- Peter Nielsen - Bestyrelsesformand
- Victor Cornelius as Pianisten
- Sigurd Langberg as Rasmus
- Sigrid Horne-Rasmussen as Sofie
- Ellen Jansø
