= Victor Montell =

Danish actor (1886–1967)

- Born: 25 September 1886; Copenhagen, Denmark
- Died: 26 October 1967 (aged 81); Frederiksberg, Denmark

Victor Montell (25 September 1886 – 26 October 1967) was a Danish stage and film actor.

== Selected filmography ==
- Mælkemandens Hest - 1918
- Det store Mørke - 1917
- Panopta I - 1918
- Panopta II - 1918
- Mælkemandens Hest - 1918
- Kærlighed og Lotteri - 1919
- Brændt a' - 1919
- Lykkens galoscher - 1921
- Film, flirt og forlovelse - 1921
- Peter Ligeglad paa Eventyr - 1923
- Sommerspøg og Rævestreger - 1923
- Daarskab, dyd og driverter - 1923
- Stamherren - 1925
- Ebberöds bank - 1926
- The Golden Smile - 1935
- Prisoner Number One - 1935
- Snehvide og de syv dværge - 1937
- Alarm - 1938
- Champagnegaloppen - 1938
- Nordhavets mænd - 1939
- Jeg har elsket og levet - 1940
- Peter Andersen - 1941
- Tror du jeg er født i går? - 1941
- Ballade i Nyhavn - 1942
- Natekspressen (P. 903) - 1942
- Familien Gelinde - 1944
- Fyrtøjet - 1946
- Berlingske Tidende - 1949
- Kampen mod uretten - 1949
- For frihed og ret - 1949
- Sønnen - 1953
- Vores lille by - 1954
- Kongeligt besøg - 1954
- En fremmed banker på - 1959
- Tro, håb og trolddom - 1960
