= En pige uden lige =

1943 film

- Directed by: Ole Berggreen; Jon Iversen
- Written by: Oscar Wennersten
- Produced by: Jens Dennow; Henning Karmark
- Starring: Ellen Gottschalch
- Cinematography: Rudolf Frederiksen
- Distributed by: ASA Film
- Release date: 2 August 1943
- Running time: 90 minutes
- Country: Denmark
- Language: Danish

En pige uden lige (English: "A girl without equal") is a 1943 Danish family film directed by Jon Iversen and starring Ellen Gottschalch.

== Cast ==
- Ellen Gottschalch as Anna Hansen
- Peter Malberg as Hans Østermann
- Johannes Meyer as Lars Østermann
- Rasmus Christiansen as Nikolaj Østermann
- Petrine Sonne as Sofie Olsen
- Poul Reichhardt as Axel Olsen
- Ib Schønberg as Bager Thorvald Christensen
- Maria Garland as Ovidia Christensen
- Inger Stender as Ella Christensen
- Hans Egede Budtz as Sognefoged Niels Nilsen
- Svend Bille as Grosserer Frederik Holm
- Randi Michelsen as Marie Louise Holm
- Sigurd Wantzin as Thomas P. Jensen
- Preben Kaas
