= Betty Helsengreen =

Danish actress (1914–1956)

- Born: 26 October 1914; Copenhagen, Denmark
- Died: 29 December 1956 (aged 42); Denmark

Betty Helsengreen (26 October 1914 – 29 December 1956) was a Danish stage and film actress.

== Filmography ==
- Week-End – 1935
- En søndag på Amager – 1941
- Elly Petersen – 1944
- Diskret ophold – 1946
- Jeg elsker en anden – 1946
- Så mødes vi hos Tove – 1946
- I de lyse nætter – 1948
- Hr. Petit – 1948
- Kampen mod uretten – 1949
- Lejlighed til leje – 1949
- Historien om Hjortholm – 1950
- Fodboldpræsten – 1951
- Den gamle mølle på Mols – 1953
- Ved Kongelunden – 1953
- Gengæld – 1955
- Mod og mandshjerte – 1955
- Be Dear to Me – 1957
