= Frk. Vildkat =

1942 film

- Directed by: Lau Lauritzen Jr. Alice O'Fredericks
- Written by: Paul Sarauw; Armand Szántó; Mihály Szécsén
- Produced by: Henning Karmark
- Starring: Marguerite Viby
- Cinematography: Rudolf Frederiksen; Alf Schnéevoigt
- Edited by: Marie Ejlersen
- Music by: Sven Gyldmark
- Release date: 28 August 1942
- Running time: 98 minutes
- Country: Denmark
- Language: Danish

Frk. Vildkat is a 1942 Danish family film directed by Lau Lauritzen Jr. and Alice O'Fredericks.

== Cast ==
- Marguerite Viby as Dolly Hansen
- Ebbe Rode as Peter Bruun
- Gerda Neumann as Louise Holm
- Ib Schønberg as Peters onkel / Oberst Hannibal Brixbye
- Maria Garland as Peters tante / Oberstinde Caroline Brixbye
- Poul Reichhardt as Herbert Rung
- Jon Iversen as Hushovmester Bølner
- Sigurd Langberg as Teaterdirektøren
- Olaf Ussing as Teaterinstruktør Hovmann
- Knud Heglund as Redaktør Hans Bruun
- Per Gudmann as Freddy
- Stig Lommer as Joakim
- Tove Arni as Hushjælp hos Peter Bruun
- Henry Nielsen as Stationsforstander
- Vera Gebuhr as Louises vendinde
