= John og Irene =

1949 Danish film directed by Asbjørn Andersen

- Directed by: Asbjørn Andersen
- Written by: Christen Jul
- Based on: Johannes Allen's novel Det bor i oss alle
- Starring: Ebbe Rode; Bodil Kjer
- Cinematography: Aage Wiltrup
- Edited by: Anker Sørensen
- Music by: Kai Møller
- Distributed by: Teatrenes Filmskontor
- Release date: August 29, 1949
- Running time: 84 minutes
- Country: Denmark
- Language: Danish

John og Irene (John and Irene) is a Danish crime film from 1949 directed by Asbjørn Andersen. The screenplay was written by Christen Jul and was based on Johannes Allen's 1941 novel Det bor i oss alle. The film stars Ebbe Rode and Bodil Kjer. The film is set in Sweden, Norway (Oslo), and Denmark.

== Plot ==
The film begins with Johannes Eriksen—who calls himself John—reporting to the criminal police in Stockholm. He says that he and his friend Irene were a dance couple. They drove from town to town in their little car and performed in restaurants and wherever else they were wanted. Three weeks earlier, the couple had arrived in Oslo after a three-week engagement in Fredrikstad. John sought out Magnussen, director of Norway's largest dance hall, the Trocadero. He denied having engaged them. When John said that two days earlier he had called the Trocadero and spoken to the director, who had engaged them, Magnussen relented and engaged the pair for five minutes for two nights.

In Gothenburg, they only wanted to engage John alone. He rejected this because he did not want to dance without Irene. The couple checked into a boarding house in Copenhagen. John called several nightclubs, but no one was interested in giving them engagements. Irene became angry, calling John stupid and saying he was no salesman, but she later apologized to him.

Benny Cunning of the Florida engagement agency called the boarding house and told John that the couple had an engagement on the Honolulu variety show. Cunning invited John and Irene—three days after their first appearance—to a party at the entertainment magnate Carlsen's, who owned the Honolulu. John went there, but Irene felt tired and canceled. John saw that Carlsen had a large number of banknotes in a drawer. When John returned to the boarding house, Irene told him that she was pregnant, and that because of their miserable financial situation she would have an abortion. John was against this. He asked to borrow NOK 4,000 from Carlsen, but he was brusquely refused. John decided to take the money in the drawer, which had fateful consequences.

== Cast ==
- Ebbe Rode as John
- Bodil Kjer as Irene
- Ib Schønberg as Carlsen, the director
- Bjarne Forchhammer as Cunning
- Torsten Winge as a Swedish vagabond
- Jon Lennart Mjøen as Magnussen, the director in Oslo
- Inge-Lise Grue as Carlsen's girlfriend
- Anton de Verdier as the hotel porter in Stockholm
- Thecla Boesen as the maid at boarding house
- Henning Moritzen as the guest at Carlsen's company (uncredited)
