= Helle for Helene =

1959 film

- Poster by Aage Lundvald
- Directed by: Gabriel Axel
- Written by: Børge Müller
- Produced by: Erik Balling
- Starring: Birgitte Bruun; Poul Reichhardt
- Cinematography: Jørgen Skov
- Edited by: Carsten Dahl
- Music by: Bent Fabricius-Bjerre
- Distributed by: Nordisk Film
- Release date: 17 August 1959
- Running time: 88 minutes
- Country: Denmark
- Language: Danish

Helle for Helene is a 1959 Danish family film directed by Gabriel Axel and starring Birgitte Bruun.

== Cast ==
- Birgitte Bruun as Helene Thomsen
- Poul Reichhardt as Tandlæge Rudolf Thomsen
- Preben Mahrt as Mathisen (bartender)
- Kjeld Petersen as Sindsygelæge Smith
- Randi Michelsen as Helenes mor Fru Tekla
- Hans W. Petersen as Holm
- Agnes Rehni as Professor Piper
- Ingeborg Skov as Prof. de Witt
- Ellen Margrethe Stein as Prof. Hvam
- Valdemar Skjerning as Professor Piper
- Arne Weel as Prof. de Witt
- Svend Bille as Prof. Hvam
- Poul Thomsen as Albert (bartender)
- Valsø Holm
- Knud Schrøder
- Henry Lohmann
- Carl Ottosen
- Knud Hallest
- Jytte Abildstrøm
- Bjørn Spiro
