= Johannes Meyer (actor) =

Danish actor (1884–1972)

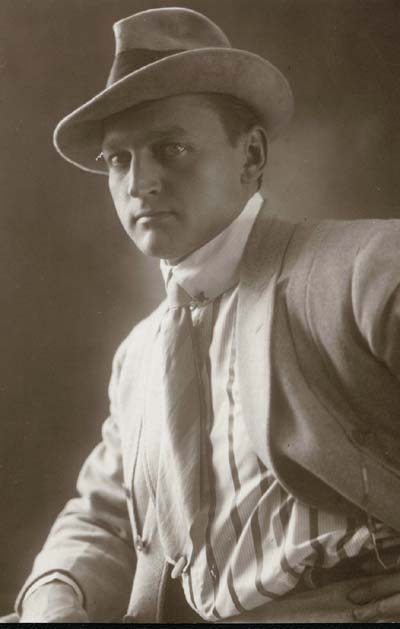
- Born: 28 May 1884; Skodsborg, Denmark
- Died: 4 November 1972 (aged 88); Copenhagen, Denmark
- Years active: 1905–1967

Johannes Meyer (28 May 1884 – 4 November 1972) was a Danish film actor.

He made his stage debut at the Dagmarteatret in Copenhagen in 1905 and went on to appear in more than 100 movies, making his first film playing the role of Erneste des Tressailles in Viggo Larsen's 'Revolutionsbryllup' at the Nordist Film Co in 1909. He was mostly seen in character or supporting roles in many talkies from 1933 until his last film appearance playing the role of Bilvis in Gabriel Axel's 'Hagbard and Signe' in 1967. He was also active on radio and in T.V. dramas and was stage director of the Fonixteatret and Norrebros Theatre before he was hired by the Royal Theatre in 1941. Died in Denmark in 1972, age 88.

== Filmography ==
- Du skal ære din hustru (Master of the House) – 1925 (directed by Carl Dreyer)
- De blaa drenge (The Blue Boys) – 1933
- Så til søs – 1933
- Flight from the Millions – 1934
- Lynet (Lightning) – 1934
- Nøddebo Præstegård – 1934
- Skaf en sensation – 1934
- De bør forelske Dem – 1935
- Rasmines bryllup – 1935
- Giftes-nej tak – 1936
- The Impossible Woman (1936)
- Inkognito – 1937
- Plat eller krone – 1937
- Alarm – 1938
- Under byens tage – 1938
- En lille tilfældighed – 1939
- Nordhavets mænd – 1939
- Skilsmissens børn – 1939
- I de gode gamle dage – 1940
- Jeg har elsket og levet – 1940
- Sommerglæder – 1940
- Gå med mig hjem – 1941
- Tag det som en mand – 1941
- Tag til Rønneby kro – 1941
- Frøken Kirkemus – 1941
- Afsporet – 1942
- Lykken kommer – 1942
- En pige uden lige – 1943
- Erik Ejegods pilgrimsfærd – 1943
- Hans onsdagsveninde – 1943
- Mine kære koner – 1943
- Teatertosset – 1944
- Besættelse – 1944
- Det bødes der for – 1944
- Det kære København – 1944
- Mit liv er musik – 1944
- Otte akkorder – 1944
- I går og i morgen – 1945
- Mani – 1947
- Røverne fra Rold – 1947
- Soldaten og Jenny – 1947
- Støt står den danske sømand – 1948
- Mens porten var lukket – 1948
- Hvor er far? – 1948
- For frihed og ret – 1949
- De røde heste – 1950
- Historien om Hjortholm – 1950
- Café Paradis – 1950
- Mosekongen – 1950
- Dorte – 1951
- Fodboldpræsten – 1951
- Som sendt fra himlen – 1951
- Fra den gamle købmandsgård – 1951
- Mød mig på Cassiopeia – 1951
- Det sande ansigt – 1951
- Frihed forpligter – 1951
- Vejrhanen – 1952
- Husmandstøsen – 1952
- Det store løb – 1952
- Ta' Pelle med – 1952
- To minutter for sent – 1952
- Vi arme syndere – 1952
- Avismanden – 1952
- This Is Life (1953)
- The Old Mill on Mols – 1953
- Hejrenæs – 1953
- We Who Go the Kitchen Route (1953)
- Min søn Peter – 1953
- Hendes store aften – 1954
- Sukceskomponisten – 1954
- Kongeligt besøg – 1954
- Tre finder en kro – 1955
- Blændværk – 1955
- Styrmand Karlsen – 1958
- Krudt og klunker – 1958
- Ballade på Bullerborg – 1959
- Flemming og Kvik – 1960
- Ullabella – 1961
- Landsbylægen – 1961
- Det stod i avisen – 1962
- Støvsugerbanden – 1963
- Hvis lille pige er du? – 1963
- Tine – 1964
- Døden kommer til middag – 1964
- Den røde kappe – 1967
