= Louis Miehe-Renard =

Danish actor (1919–1997)

- Born: 11 April 1919; Copenhagen, Denmark
- Died: 21 January 1997 (aged 77); Denmark
- Occupation: Actor
- Years active: 1948–1988

Louis Miehe-Renard (11 April 1919 – 21 January 1997) was a Danish film actor. He appeared in 70 films between 1948 and 1988. He was born in Copenhagen, Denmark and died in Denmark.

== Filmography ==
- Det hændte i København – 1949
- For frihed og ret – 1949
- Kampen mod uretten – 1949
- Min kone er uskyldig – 1950
- Det sande ansigt – 1951
- Fodboldpræsten – 1951
- Nålen – 1951
- Bag de røde porte – 1951
- Alt dette og Island med – 1951
- Familien Schmidt – 1951
- Det gamle guld – 1951
- To minutter for sent – 1952
- Vejrhanen – 1952
- Fløjtespilleren – 1953
- Adam og Eva – 1953
- Ved Kongelunden – 1953
- The Old Mill on Mols – 1953
- Himlen er blå – 1954
- Sukceskomponisten – 1954
- I kongens klær – 1954
- Far til fire på landet – 1955
- Mod og mandshjerte – 1955
- Der kom en dag – 1955
- På tro og love – 1955
- Kristiane af Marstal – 1956
- Hvad vil De ha'? – 1956
- Sønnen fra Amerika – 1957
- Over alle grænser – 1958
- Det lille hotel – 1958
- Soldaterkammerater – 1958
- Lyssky transport gennem Danmark – 1958
- Soldaterkammerater rykker ud – 1959
- Soldaterkammerater på vagt – 1960
- Tro, håb og trolddom – 1960
- Frihedens pris – 1960
- Flemming og Kvik – 1960
- Skibet er ladet med – 1960
- Soldaterkammerater på efterårsmanøvre – 1961
- Flemming på kostskole – 1961
- Soldaterkammerater på sjov – 1962
- Den kære familie – 1962
- Journey to the Seventh Planet – 1962
- Fem mand og Rosa – 1964
- Dyden går amok – 1966
- Nu stiger den – 1966
- Soldaterkammerater på bjørnetjeneste – 1968
- Kyrkoherden – 1970
- Pigen og drømmeslottet – 1974
