= Death Comes at High Noon =

1964 film

- Directed by: Erik Balling
- Written by: Erik Balling; Peter Sander
- Produced by: Bo Christensen
- Starring: Poul Reichhardt
- Cinematography: Arne Abrahamsen; Jørgen Skov
- Distributed by: Nordisk Film
- Release date: 31 July 1964
- Running time: 98 minutes
- Country: Denmark
- Language: Danish

Death Comes at High Noon (Danish: Døden kommer til middag) is a 1964 Danish crime film directed by Erik Balling and starring Poul Reichhardt.

== Cast ==
- Poul Reichhardt as Peter Sander
- Helle Virkner as Eva Lindberg
- Birgitte Federspiel as Merete Lindberg
- Jan Priiskorn-Schmidt as John Lindberg
- Morten Grunwald as Bertel Lindberg
- Kirsten Søberg as Frk. Jørgensen
- Karl Stegger as Overbetjent Duus Jensen
- Pouel Kern as Overbetjent Hald
- Gunnar Lauring as Doktor Lund
- Gunnar Strømvad as Autoforhandler H. F. Kærgaard
- Ebba Amfeldt as Fru Kærgaard
- Kai Holm as Tømmerhandleren
- Einar Nørby as Lastbilchauffør
- Johannes Meyer as Dr. Joachim Lindberg

== Production ==
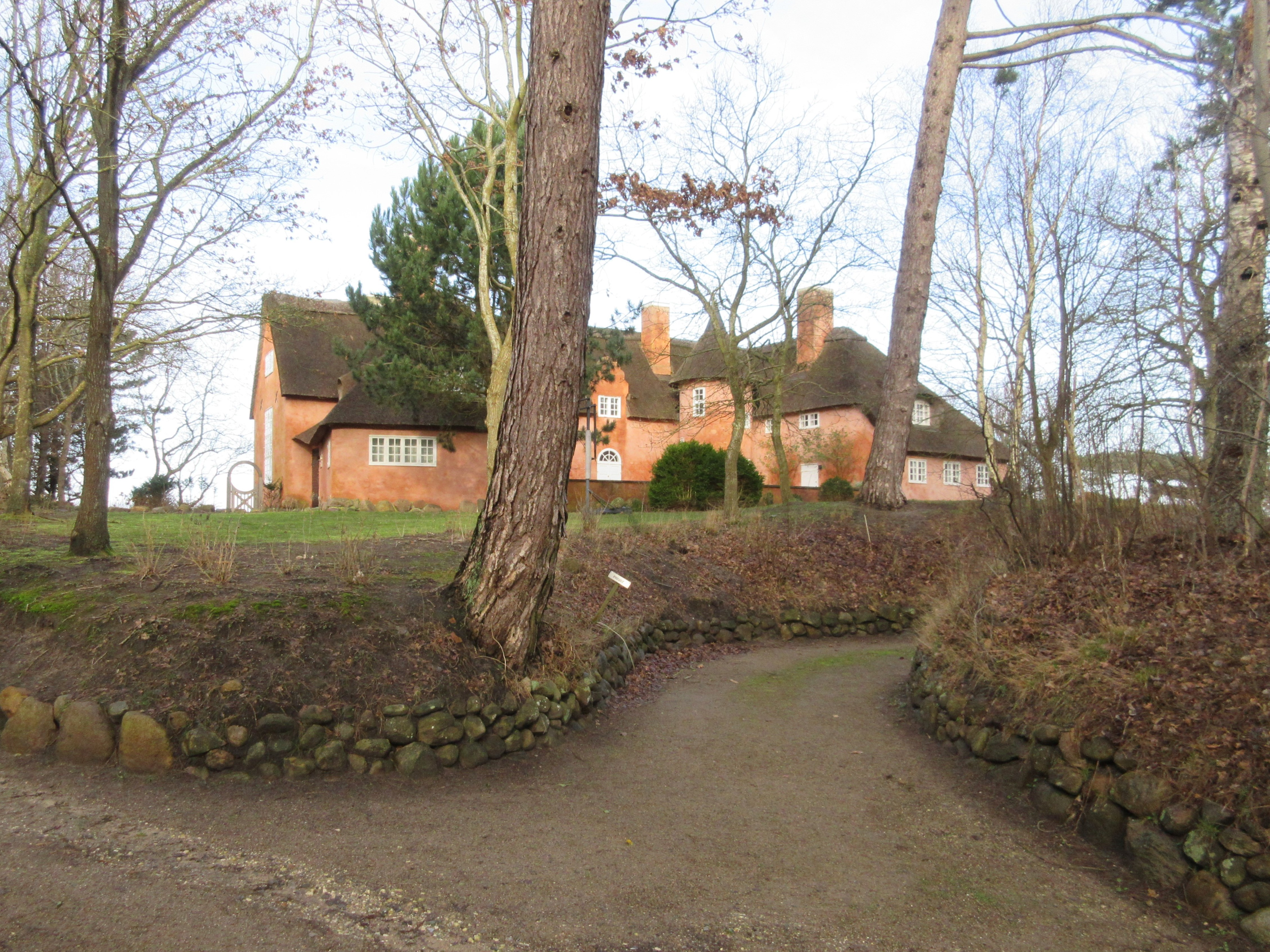
Rågegården at Rågeleje in January 2020

Much of the film was shot in or around the country house Rågegården at Rågeleje. Some of the forest scenes were shot at Silkeborg.
