= Valdemar Skjerning =

Danish actor (1887–1970)

- Born: 31 October 1887; Palleshave, Årslev Municipality, Denmark
- Died: 19 August 1970 (aged 82); Copenhagen, Denmark

Valdemar Skjerning (31 October 1887 – 19 August 1970) was a Danish stage and film actor.

== Filmography ==
- Kongen bød - 1938
- Jens Langkniv (film) - 1940
- Damen med de lyse handsker - 1942
- Drama på slottet - 1943
- Elly Petersen - 1944
- Det kære København - 1944
- Mens sagføreren sover - 1945
- Den usynlige hær - 1945
- My name is Petersen - 1947
- For frihed og ret - 1949
- Berlingske Tidende (film) - 1949
- Kampen mod uretten - 1949
- Rekrut 67 Petersen - 1952
- Det store løb - 1952
- Vejrhanen - 1952
- Himlen er blå - 1954
- Karen, Maren og Mette - 1954
- Flintesønnerne - 1956
- Helle for Helene - 1959
- Landsbylægen - 1961
