= Berthe Qvistgaard =

Danish actress (1910–1999)

- Born: 11 August 1910; Copenhagen, Denmark
- Died: 24 October 1999 (aged 89); Frederiksberg, Denmark

Berthe Qvistgaard (11 August 1910 – 24 October 1999) was a Danish stage and film actress, and winner of the prestigious Tagea Brandt Rejselegat award in 1965.

She was a rector of the Danish National School of Theatre and Contemporary Dance for a period of her life.

She died from Alzheimer's disease which she suffered from throughout the 1990s.

== Selected filmography ==
- I dag begynder livet (1939)
- Familien Olsen (1940)
- Pas på svinget i Solby (1940)
- Tror du jeg er født i går! (1941)
- Besættelse (1944)
- My Son Peter (1953)
- Faith, Hope and Witchcraft (1960)
- Flemming og Kvik (1960)
- Det stod i avisen (1962)
- Johnny Larsen (1979)
- The Dark Side of the Moon (1986)
