= Olaf Ussing =

Danish actor (1907–1990)

- Born: 28 April 1907; Frederiksberg, Denmark
- Died: 4 January 1990 (aged 82); Frederiksberg, Denmark
- Occupation: Actor
- Years active: 1937–1988

Olaf Ussing (28 April 1907 – 4 January 1990) was a Danish film actor. He appeared in 64 films between 1937 and 1988.

He was born in Denmark and also died there.

== Selected filmography ==
- Frk. Møllers jubilæum (1937)
- Frk. Vildkat (1942)
- Lady with the Light Gloves (1942)
- Lucky Journey (1947)
- Kampen mod uretten (1949)
- The Poet and the Little Mother (1959)
- Panic in Paradise (1960)
- Harry and the Butler (1961)
- Det støver stadig (1962)
- Ballad of Carl-Henning (1969)
- Girls at Arms 2 (1976)
