= Svend Bille =

Danish actor (1888–1973)

- Born: 15 July 1888; Copenhagen, Denmark
- Died: 3 April 1973 (aged 84)

Svend Bille (15 July 1888 – 3 April 1973) was a Danish stage and film actor.

== Filmography ==
- Den hvide slavehandel - 1910
- Balletdanserinden - 1911
- Den hvide slavehandels sidste offer - 1911
- Vampyrdanserinden (The Vampire Dancer) - 1912
- Atlantis - 1913
- Tretten år - 1932
- Odds 777 - 1932
- De blaa drenge - 1933
- Lynet - 1934
- Week-End - 1935
- En lille tilfældighed - 1939
- Alle går rundt og forelsker sig - 1941
- Come Home with Me - 1941
- Wienerbarnet - 1941
- Tag til Rønneby Kro - 1941
- Wienerbarnet - 1941
- Ballade i Nyhavn - 1942
- Hans onsdagsveninde - 1943
- En pige uden lige - 1943
- Familien Gelinde - 1944
- Man elsker kun een gang - 1945
- Panik i familien - 1945
- Penge som græs - 1948
- Hvor er far? - 1948
- Lejlighed til leje - 1949
- Min kone er uskyldig - 1950
- Som sendt fra himlen - 1951
- Father of Four - 1953
- Mig og min familie - 1957
- Krudt og klunker - 1958
- Mariannes bryllup - 1958
- Helle for Helene - 1959
- Paw - 1959
- Skibet er ladet med - 1960
- Støvsugerbanden - 1963
- Vi har det jo dejligt - 1963
- It's Nifty in the Navy - 1965
- The Olsen Gang in a Fix - 1969
