= Børge Müller =

Danish screenwriter

- Born: 4 September 1909; Denmark
- Died: 16 August 1963 (aged 53); Denmark
- Occupation: Screenwriter
- Years active: 1934 - 1963

Børge Müller (4 September 1909 – 16 August 1963) was a Danish screenwriter. He wrote for 24 films between 1934 and 1963.

== Filmography ==
- Skaf en sensation (1934)
- Cocktail (1937)
- Der var engang en Vicevært (1937)
- Alarm (1938)
- Blaavand melder Storm (1938)
- De tre måske fire (1939)
- En ganske almindelig pige (1940)
- Far skal giftes (1941)
- Tag til Rønneby Kro (1941)
- Mine kære koner (1943)
- Hatten er sat (1947)
- Mød mig paa Cassiopeia (1951)
- Som sendt fra himlen (1951)
- Hvad vil De ha'? (1956)
- Verdens rigeste pige (1958)
- Mor skal giftes (1958)
- Helle for Helene (1959)
- Flemming og Kvik (1960)
- Mine tossede drenge (1961)
- Peters baby (1961)
- Min kone fra Paris (1961)
- Han, Hun, Dirch og Dario (1962)
- Venus fra Vestø (1962)
- Frøken Nitouche (1963)
