= Café Paradis =

1950 film

- 1950 movie poster by Aage Lundvald
- Directed by: Bodil Ipsen; Lau Lauritzen Jr.
- Written by: Johannes Allen
- Starring: Poul Reichhardt; Ib Schønberg
- Cinematography: Rudolf Frederiksen
- Edited by: Marie Ejlersen
- Music by: Sven Gyldmark
- Distributed by: ASA Film
- Release date: 1950
- Running time: 101 mins
- Country: Denmark
- Language: Danish

Café Paradis (English Title: Paradise Cafe) is a 1950 Danish film, directed by Bodil Ipsen and Lau Lauritzen Jr., and written by Johannes Allen. The film received the Bodil Award for Best Danish Film, and Ib Schønberg, for what is regarded his finest performance, received the Bodil Award for Best Supporting Actor.

The story illuminates the problems of alcoholism as it follows the lives of two people: one is a common workman (played by Poul Reichhardt) who drinks too much beer, and the other is a company director (played by Ib Schønberg), who believes he just needs "a little one every now and then." They both come to face the consequences of their addictions.

== Cast ==
- Poul Reichhardt
- Ib Schønberg
- Ingeborg Brams
- Else Højgaard
- Karin Nellemose
- Johannes Meyer
- Jørn Jeppesen
- Inge Hvid-Møller
- Asbjørn Andersen
- Lau Lauritzen Jr.
- Aage Fønss
