= I de gode, gamle dage =

1940 film

- Directed by: Johan Jacobsen
- Written by: Kelvin Lindemann
- Starring: Christian Arhoff
- Cinematography: Carlo Bentsen; Einar Olsen
- Release date: 9 August 1940
- Running time: 101 minutes
- Country: Denmark
- Language: Danish

I de gode, gamle dage is a 1940 Danish film directed by Johan Jacobsen and starring Christian Arhoff.

== Cast ==
In alphabetical order

- Christian Arhoff
- Carl Fischer
- Elith Foss
- Helga Frier
- Harald Holst
- Gunnar Lemvigh
- Harald Madsen as Bivognen
- Johannes Meyer
- Peter Nielsen
- Clara Østø
- Aage Redal
- Poul Reichhardt
- Eigil Reimers
- Carl Schenstrøm as Fyrtaarnet
- Christian Schrøder
- Ole Skaarup as Gunner
- Lise Thomsen as Jytte
