= Torkil Lauritzen =

Danish actor (1901–1979)

- Born: Fritz Torkild Laursen; 18 June 1901; Frederiksberg, Denmark
- Died: 4 June 1979 (aged 77)

Torkil Lauritzen (18 June 1901 – 4 June 1979) was a Danish actor.

== Selected filmography ==
- Vester Vov-Vov – 1927
- Kraft og skønhed – 1928
- Hallo! Afrika forude! – 1929
- En fuldendt gentleman – 1937
- Frøken Møllers jubilæum – 1937
- Der var engang en vicevært – 1937
- Alarm – 1938
- Blaavand melder storm – 1938
- Champagnegaloppen – 1938
- Nordhavets mænd – 1939
- Pas på svinget i Solby – 1940
- Jeg har elsket og levet – 1940
- Sommerglæder – 1940
- Søren Søndervold – 1942
- Besættelse – 1944
- Ta', hvad du vil ha' – 1947
- For frihed og ret – 1949
- Kampen mod uretten – 1949
- Frihed forpligter – 1951
- Hold fingrene fra mor – 1951
- Vi arme syndere – 1952
- Fløjtespilleren – 1953
- Himlen er blå – 1954
- En sømand går i land – 1954
- Tre finder en kro – 1955
- Taxa K-1640 Efterlyses – 1955
- Vagabonderne på Bakkegården – 1958
- Lyssky transport gennem Danmark – 1958
- Pigen i søgelyset – 1959
- Cirkus Buster – 1961
- Støvsugerbanden – 1963
- Nyhavns glade gutter – 1967
- Rend mig i revolutionen – 1970
