= Ib Schønberg =

Danish actor (1902–1955)

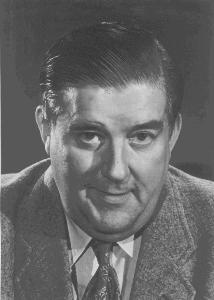
- Born: 23 October 1902; Copenhagen, Denmark
- Died: 24 September 1955 (aged 52); Copenhagen, Denmark
- Occupation: Actor
- Years active: 1920–1955
- Spouse: Astrid Inger Lisbeth Hammer
- Awards: Bodil Award Best Supporting Actor; 1948 Take What You Want Bodil Award Best Supporting Actor; 1951 Cafe Paradis

Ib Christian Albert von Cotta Schønberg (23 October 1902 – 24 September 1955) was a Danish film actor, and is considered one of the leading actors of Danish film in the 20th century.

== Early life ==
The son of a chemist, Ib Schønberg was interested in acting from an early age. He made his debut in 1920 and worked for more than ten years as a stage actor.

== Career ==
Schønberg made his screen debut in Benjamin Christensen's 1922 horror/documentary Häxan. By the 1930s he was an established comic actor, often in main roles as leaders of buffoon duos, well-meaning policemen, or more substantial "uncle types". During World War II he suddenly appeared as a dramatic actor, and from then until his death he maintained his position as one of the greatest actors of Danish art films, playing serious roles alongside comic roles.

He was well known for his ability to perform "the colossus with feet of clay", apparently solid and superior characters – both sympathetic and unsympathetic – who fall apart by the end of the film. Among his best-known serious performances are his mean-cultivated informer type in Afsporet (1942 – Derailed); his leader af a children's home, a sadist with shattered nerves in the social film Kampen mod uretten (1949 – The Struggle Against Injustice) and his two portraits of alcoholics in Ta’ hvad du vil ha’ (1947 – Take What You Want) and Café Paradis (1951). In his later years he was a regular participant in the so-called "Morten Korch films" (based upon the regional novels of a very popular Danish light literate) often placed as the fatherly friend of the hero and his serial role as a widower with children in the popular Far til fire (The Father of Four) films.

Apart from a few Swedish movies, Schønberg made only Danish films. In 1940, he was offered the role of Martin Luther in a Hollywood production, but he turned it down.

In 1949, Schønberg took part in every Danish film of that year, and during the last six years of his life (1949–1955) he appeared in almost 60 films. It was a saying about him, that if 10 Danish films were made, he would be in the 11 of them. He was an active public figure, appearing at the opening of exhibitions, and freely providing the press with interviews about his ideas and projects. Schønberg, with his volatile temper and often transient commitment to projects, felt best suited to working in films rather than theatre. However, he occasionally performed on stage and during his last years he was director of the "Circus Revue".

== Death ==
He contracted pneumonia in May 1955 and remained bed-ridden until he died on 24 September 1955.

== Awards ==
In 1948, Schønberg won the Bodil Award for Best Supporting Actor for his role as Oscar Bergholtz in the film Ta', hvad du vil ha' (English title: Take What You Want). He again received the Bodil for Best Supporting Actor in 1951 for the film Café Paradis (Paradise Cafe).

== Filmography ==
- Häxan (1922)
- Hr. Tell og søn (1930)
- De blaa drenge (1933)
- Københavnere (1933)
- Ud i den kolde sne (1934)
- Barken Margrethe af Danmark (1934)
- København, Kalundborg og - ? (1934)
- Weekend (1935)
- Provinsen kalder (1935)
- Kidnapped (1935)
- Bag Københavns kulisser (1935)
- Snushanerne (1936)
- Panserbasse (1936)
- Giftes-nej tak (1936)
- Flådens blå matroser (1937)
- Inkognito (1937)
- Plat eller krone (1937)
- En lille tilfældighed (1939)
- I dag begynder livet (1939)
- Pas på svinget i Solby (1940)
- En ganske almindelig pige (1940)
- Familien Olsen (1940)
- Frøken Kirkemus (1941)
- Tag til Rønneby kro (1941)
- Far skal giftes (1941)
- Niels Pind og hans dreng (1941)
- Søren Søndervold (1942)
- Afsporet (1942)
- En herre i kjole og hvidt (1942)
- Lykken kommer (1942)
- Tyrannens fald (1942)
- Frk. Vildkat (1942)
- Op med humøret (1943)
- En pige uden lige (1943)
- Det ender med bryllup (1943)
- Hans onsdagsveninde (1943)
- Biskoppen (1944)
- Otte akkorder (1944)
- Elly Petersen (1944)
- Teatertosset (1944)
- Frihed – lighed og Louise (1944)
- Mordets melodi (1944)
- De kloge og vi gale (1945)
- Man elsker kun een gang (1945)
- Panik i familien (1945)
- Affæren Birte (1945)
- Jeg elsker en anden (1946)
- Brita in the Merchant's House (1946)
- Hans store aften (1946)
- Diskret ophold (1946)
- Ta' hvad du vil há (1947)
- Calle og Palle (1947)
- Røverne fra Rold (1947)
- The Swedenhielm Family (1947)
- Lise kommer til byen (1947)
- Mani (1947)
- Tre år efter (1948)
- Mens porten var lukket (1948)
- Hvor er far ? (1948)
- Vi vil ha' et barn (1949)
- Lejlighed til leje (1949)
- John og Irene (1949)
- Kampen mod uretten (1949)
- Den stjålne minister (1949)
- Det hændte i København (1949)
- Det gælder os alle (1949)
- For frihed og ret (1949)
- De røde heste – 1950 (1950)
- I gabestokken (1950)
- Mosekongen (1950)
- Din fortid er glemt (1950)
- Den opvakte jomfru (1950)
- Lynfotografen (1950)
- Susanne (1950)
- Café Paradis (1950)
- Historien om Hjortholm (1950)
- Fodboldpræsten (1951)
- Fireogtyve timer (1951)
- Vores fjerde far (1951)
- Det sande ansigt (1951)
- Fra den gamle købmandsgård (1951)
- Bag de røde porte (1951)
- Det gamle guld (1951)
- Lyntoget (1951)
- Hold fingrene fra mor (1951)
- Ta' Pelle med (1952)
- Mød mig på Cassiopeia (1951)
- Unge piger forsvinder i København (1951)
- Dorte (1951)
- Det store løb (1952)
- Vi arme syndere (1952)
- Kærlighedsdoktoren (1952)
- Avismanden (1952)
- Rekrut 67 Petersen (1952)
- Husmandstøsen (1952)
- Min søn Peter (1953)
- Sønnen (1953)
- Hejrenæs (1953)
- Far til Fire (1953)
- Ved Kongelunden (1953)
- We Who Go the Kitchen Route (1953)
- The Old Mill on Mols (1953)
- Fløjtespilleren (1953)
- The Crime of Tove Andersen (1953)
- Far til fire i sneen (1954)
- Hendes store aften (1954)
- Kongeligt besøg (1954)
- I kongens klær (1954)
- Jan går til filmen (1954)
- Arvingen (1954)
- En sømand går i land (1954)
- Troll i ord (1954)
- Far och flyg (1955)
- Blændværk (1955)
- Gengæld (1955)
- Bruden fra Dragstrup (1955)
