= Poul Müller =

Danish actor (1909–1979)

- Born: 31 December 1909; Copenhagen, Denmark
- Died: 15 September 1979 (aged 69); Denmark
- Occupation: Actor
- Years active: 1936–1977

Poul Müller (31 December 1909 – 15 September 1979) was a Danish film actor. He appeared in 44 films between 1936 and 1977. He was born in Copenhagen, Denmark and died in Denmark.

== Filmography ==
- Millionærdrengen – 1936
- Flådens blå matroser – 1937
- Frihed, lighed og Louise – 1944
- Den usynlige hær – 1945
- Sikken en nat – 1947
- Mosekongen – 1950
- Det sande ansigt – 1951
- Dorte – 1951
- Avismanden – 1952
- To minutter for sent – 1952
- Adam og Eva – 1953
- This Is Life (1953)
- Hendes store aften – 1954
- Himlen er blå – 1954
- Vores lille by – 1954
- Blændværk – 1955
- Der kom en dag – 1955
- Færgekroen – 1956
- Jeg elsker dig – 1957
- Bundfald – 1957
- Tre piger fra Jylland – 1957
- Ung kærlighed – 1958
- Tro, håb og trolddom – 1960
- Een blandt mange – 1961
- Sorte Shara – 1961
- To skøre ho'der – 1961
- Duellen – 1962
- Rikki og mændene – 1962
- Det tossede paradis – 1962
- Vi voksne – 1963
- Jensen længe leve – 1965
- En ven i bolignøden – 1965
- Utro – 1966
- På'en igen Amalie – 1973
- Nyt legetøj – 1977
