= Week-end (1935 film) =

1935 film

- Directed by: Lau Lauritzen Jr. Alice O'Fredericks
- Written by: Lau Lauritzen Jr. Alice O'Fredericks
- Cinematography: Carlo Bentsen
- Edited by: Edith Schlüssel
- Release date: 19 September 1935
- Running time: 102 minutes
- Country: Denmark
- Language: Danish

Week-end is a 1935 Danish film directed by Lau Lauritzen Jr. and Alice O'Fredericks.

== Cast ==
- Svend Bille
- Gerd Gjedved
- Per Gundmann
- Betty Helsengreen
- Jon Iversen
- Ellen Jansø
- Arthur Jensen as Styrmand
- Sigfred Johansen
- Sigurd Langberg
- Lau Lauritzen, Jr. as Poul
- Carola Merrild
- Poul Reichhardt as Kaproer
- Eigil Reimers
- Ib Schønberg as Pouls fætter
- Christian Schrøder
- Nanna Stenersen as Eva
- Tove Wallenstrøm as Friend
