= Sigurd Langberg =

Danish actor (1897–1954)

- Born: 29 October 1897; Copenhagen, Denmark
- Died: 8 July 1954 (aged 56); Copenhagen, Denmark
- Years active: 1924–1954

Sigurd Bengt Langberg (29 October 1897 – 8 July 1954) was a Danish stage and film actor.

He was married to actress Karna Langberg and was the father of actors Ebbe and Jesper Langberg.

== Filmography ==
- Han, hun og Hamlet (1922)
- Ole Opfinders offer (1924)
- Københavns Sherlock Holmes (1925)
- Hendes Naade, Dragonen (1925)
- The Clown (1926)
- Krudt med knald (1931)
- Barken Margrethe af Danmark (1934)
- Ud i den kolde sne (1934)
- Week-End (1935)
- De bør forelske Dem (1935)
- Bag Københavns kulisser (1935)
- Min kone er husar (1935)
- Provinsen kalder (1935)
- Snushanerne (1936)
- Millionærdrengen (1936)
- Sjette trækning (1936)
- Mille, Marie og mig (1937)
- Der var engang en vicevært (1937)
- Alarm (1938)
- Bolettes brudefærd (1938)
- Blaavand melder storm (1938)
- Under byens tage (1938)
- En lille tilfældighed (1939)
- De tre, måske fire (1939)
- Genboerne (1939)
- Komtessen på Stenholt (1939)
- Sommerglæder (1940)
- Familien Olsen (1940)
- Pas på svinget i Solby (1940)
- En desertør (1940)
- En pige med pep (1940)
- Alle går rundt og forelsker sig (1941)
- Tobiasnætter (1941)
- Thummelumsen (1941)
- Tag til Rønneby kro (1941)
- En mand af betydning (1941)
- Peter Andersen (1941)
- Forellen (1942)
- Frøken Vildkat (1942)
- Natekspressen (P. 903) (1942)
- Afsporet – (1942)
- Når bønder elsker (1942)
- Kriminalassistent Bloch (1943)
- Møllen (1943)
- Det ender med bryllup (1943)
- Biskoppen (1944)
- Man elsker kun een gang (1945)
- Den usynlige hær (1945)
- Op med lille Martha (1946)
- Hans store aften (1946)
- Når katten er ude (1947)
- Røverne fra Rold (1947)
- Sikken en nat (1947)
- Tre år efter (1948)
- For frihed og ret (1949)
- Det gælder os alle (1949)
- Kampen mod uretten (1949)
- Den opvakte jomfru (1950)
- Mosekongen (1950)
- Det gamle guld (1951)
- Dorte (1951)
- Vejrhanen (1952)
- Husmandstøsen (1952)
- Far til fire (1953)
- Himlen er blå (1954)
