= Ud i den kolde sne =

1934 film

- Front cover of the Danish DVD
- Directed by: Alice O'Fredericks; Lau Lauritzen Jr.
- Written by: Alice O'Fredericks; Lau Lauritzen Jr.
- Produced by: Svend Nielsen
- Starring: Mathilde Nielsen
- Cinematography: Carlo Bentsen
- Edited by: Edith Schlüssel
- Release date: 9 April 1934
- Running time: 120 minutes
- Country: Denmark
- Language: Danish

Ud i den kolde sne is a 1934 Danish comedy film directed by Lau Lauritzen Jr. and Alice O'Fredericks. It was Fredericks debut film as a director. The title means "Out in the cold snow" in English.

== Cast ==
- Mathilde Nielsen as Baronesse Caroline von Hessen / 'Bedstemor'
- Hans W. Petersen as Baron Povl von Hessen
- Ib Schønberg as Taxachauffør Peter Basse
- Gerd Gjedved as Lotte Basse
- Sigurd Langberg as Godejer Brun
- Aase Clausen as Aase Brun
- Ellen Jansø as Korpige Vera Vernonica
- Arthur Jensen as Tjener Johan
- Arne-Ole David as Dr. Nicols
- Henry Nielsen as Mediet
- Christian Schrøder as Den gamle chauffør
- Carl Fischer as Foged
- Clara Østø as Den fredgene pige
- Alex Suhr as Direktør Hallenberg
