= Freddy Koch =

Danish actor (1916–1980)

- Born: 21 March 1916; Copenhagen, Denmark
- Died: 10 August 1980 (aged 64); Denmark
- Occupation: Actor
- Years active: 1945–1976

Freddy Koch (21 March 1916 – 10 August 1980) was a Danish film actor. He appeared in 22 films between 1945 and 1976. He was born in Copenhagen, Denmark and died in Denmark. He was married to Danish actress Birgitte Federspiel.

== Selected filmography ==
- Relax Freddie (1966)
- Gøngehøvdingen (1961)
- Det skete på Møllegården (1960)
- Vi arme syndere (1952)
- The Red Meadows (1945)
