= Edith Hermansen =

Danish actress

- Born: 11 December 1907; Denmark
- Died: 9 February 1988 (aged 80); Denmark
- Occupation: Actress
- Years active: 1946-1969

Edith Hermansen (11 December 1907 – 9 February 1988) was a Danish film actress. She appeared in 30 films between 1946 and 1969. She was born and died in Denmark.

== Selected filmography ==
- Kampen mod uretten (1949)
- Mosekongen (1950)
- Rekrut 67, Petersen (1952)
- Støv på hjernen (1961)
- Det støver stadig (1962)
- Venus fra Vestø (1962)
