= We Meet at Tove's =

1946 film

- Front cover of the Danish DVD for Så mødes vi hos Tove
- Directed by: Alice O'Fredericks; Grete Frische
- Written by: Grete Frische
- Produced by: Henning Karmark
- Starring: Illona Wieselmann; Gull-Maj Norin; Inger Stender
- Cinematography: Rudolf Frederiksen
- Edited by: Marie Ejlersen
- Music by: Sven Gyldmark; Mogens Dam (lyrics)
- Distributed by: ASA Film
- Release date: 31 July 1946
- Running time: 72 minutes
- Country: Denmark
- Language: Danish

We Meet at Tove's (Danish: Så mødes vi hos Tove) is a 1946 Danish drama directed by Alice O'Fredericks and Grete Frische. The film stars an ensemble cast, including Illona Wieselmann, Gull-Maj Norin, Helle Virkner and Inger Stender in a story about eight women who meet ten years after their high school graduation to discuss the reality of their lives. It has been noted as one of the first Danish films which focused on women and women's rights.

== Cast ==
Actor	Role
Illona Wieselmann	Tove
Clara Østø	Kitty
Gull-Maj Norin	Gerd
Grethe Holmer	Jytte Hansen
Inger Stender	Dolly
Gudrun Ringheim	Lis
Tudlik Johansen	Bitten
Betty Helsengreen	Åse
Anna Henriques-Nielsen	Fru Petersen
Poul Reichhardt	John Nielsen
Axel Frische	Hansen
Eigil Reimers	Per Ibsen
Edvin Tiemroth	Erik
Jørn Jeppesen	Torben
Grete Frische	Norma
Helle Virkner	Solvej Nielsen
