= Tage Nielsen =

Danish composer

Tage Nielsen (16 January 1929 – 23 March 2003) was a Danish composer. He was born in Frederiksberg, and studied with Rued Langgaard and worked for Danish Radio as well as being a professor at the Danish Academy of Music.

== Works, editions and recordings ==
- Giardino Magico: Il giardino magico. Passacaglia. Konzertstuck for piano and 11 instruments. Jean Thorel
