= Henry Nielsen (actor) =

Danish actor (1890–1967)

- Born: 1 November 1890; Copenhagen, Denmark
- Died: 12 May 1967 (aged 76); Sundby, Copenhagen, Denmark

Henry Nielsen (1 November 1890 – 12 May 1967) was a Danish stage and film actor.

== Selected filmography ==
- Dødsbokseren - 1926
- Kys, klap og kommers - 1929
- Hallo, Afrika forude - 1929
- Krudt med knald - 1931
- Han, hun og Hamlet - 1932
- Ud i den kolde sne - 1934
- Min kone er husar - 1935
- Millionærdrengen - 1936
- I folkets navn - 1938
- Sommerglæder - 1940
- Niels Pind og hans dreng - 1941
- Tak fordi du kom, Nick - 1941
- En søndag på Amager - 1941
- Thummelumsen - 1941
- Alle mand på dæk - 1942
- Frøken Vildkat - 1942
- Søren Søndervold - 1942
- Tyrannens fald - 1942
- Lykken kommer - 1942
- Regnen holdt op - 1942
- Alt for karrieren - 1943
- Det ender med bryllup - 1943
- Op med humøret - 1943
- Kriminalassistent Bloch - 1943
- Bedstemor går amok - 1944
- Teatertosset - 1944
- To som elsker hinanden - 1944
- Spurve under taget - 1944
- Elly Petersen - 1944
- Otte akkorder - 1944
- En ny dag gryer - 1945
- Affæren Birte - 1945
- Panik i familien - 1945
- Oktoberroser - 1946
- Brevet fra afdøde - 1946
- Hans store aften - 1946
- I Love Another - 1946
- Op med lille Martha - 1946
- Så mødes vi hos Tove - 1946
- De pokkers unger - 1947
- Sikken en nat - 1947
- The Swedenhielm Family - 1947
- Når katten er ude - 1947
- Stjerneskud - 1947
- Ta', hvad du vil ha' - 1947
- Mens porten var lukket - 1948
- Tre år efter - 1948
- I de lyse nætter - 1948
- Den stjålne minister - 1949
- For frihed og ret - 1949
- Lejlighed til leje - 1949
- Berlingske Tidende (film) - 1949
- Kampen mod uretten - 1949
- Min kone er uskyldig - 1950
- Historien om Hjortholm - 1950
- Mosekongen - 1950
- Vores fjerde far - 1951
- Fra den gamle købmandsgård - 1951
- Bag de røde porte - 1951
- Nålen - 1951
- Dorte - 1951
- Ta' Pelle med - 1952
- Rekrut 67 Petersen - 1952
- Kærlighedsdoktoren - 1952
- Avismanden - 1952
- Vi arme syndere - 1952
- Den gamle mølle på Mols - 1953
- Sønnen - 1953
- Ved Kongelunden - 1953
- Himlen er blå - 1954
- I kongens klær - 1954
- Jan går til filmen - 1954
- Vores lille by - 1954
- Bruden fra Dragstrup - 1955
- Tre finder en kro - 1955
- Hvad vil De ha'? - 1956
- Den kloge mand (1956) - 1956
- Den store gavtyv - 1956
- Færgekroen - 1956
- Kristiane af Marstal - 1956
- Father of Four and Uncle Sofus - 1957
- Sønnen fra Amerika - 1957
- Tag til marked i Fjordby - 1957
- Tre piger fra Jylland - 1957
- Father of Four on Bornholm - 1959
- Pigen i søgelyset - 1959
- Eventyrrejsen - 1960
- Eventyr på Mallorca - 1961
- Komtessen - 1961
- Støvsugerbanden - 1964
- Alt for kvinden - 1964
- Ih, du forbarmende - 1964
- Een pige og 39 sømænd - 1965
- Sytten - 1965
- Hold da helt ferie - 1965
- En ven i bolignøden - 1965
- Der var engang - 1966
- Flagermusen - 1966
- Soyas tagsten - 1966
- Min kones ferie - 1967
