= Leck Fischer =

Danish author and playwright

- Born: March 26, 1904; Copenhagen, Denmark
- Died: June 17, 1956 (aged 52); Gentofte, Denmark
- Occupation(s): Author and playwright
- Relatives: Viggo Kampmann

Otto Peter Leck Fischer (March 26, 1904 – June 17, 1956) was a Danish writer and playwright. He was the brother of the politician Viggo Kampmann. Fischer was a socially conscious writer that portrayed the modern urban man with a sad, gray everyday life. His literary style was cool and matter-of-fact. Fischer was read and appreciated in his day, but he has since been forgotten (except in literary-history circles), perhaps because he was so closely associated with the time in which he lived and which he portrayed. Fischer made a name for himself in many genres: novels, films, and radio drama. He is buried at Mariebjerg Cemetery in Gentofte.

Leck Fischer's plays are held in the theater collection at the Royal Library.
