= Jon Iversen =

Danish actor

- Born: 1 December 1889; Sakskøbing, Denmark
- Died: 17 August 1964 (aged 74); Copenhagen, Denmark

Jon Iversen (Danish pronunciation: [ˈiˀvɐsn̩], 1 December 1889 – 17 August 1964) was a Danish stage and film actor and film director.

== Selected filmography ==
- Blind Justice – 1916
- Hotel Paradis – 1931
- Week-End – 1935
- Frøken Møllers jubilæum – 1937
- Inkognito (film) – 1937
- En ganske almindelig pige – 1940
- Familien Olsen – 1940
- Pas på svinget i Solby – 1940
- Tag til Rønneby Kro – 1941
- Frøken Vildkat – 1942
- En pige uden lige – 1943
- Støt står den danske sømand – 1948
- I gabestokken – 1950
- Dorte – 1951
- Det gamle guld – 1951
- This Is Life – 1953
- Arvingen – 1954
- Vagabonderne på Bakkegården – 1958
- Far til fire på Bornholm – 1959
