= List of films based on comics =

This is a list based on comics. It includes films that are adaptations of comics, and those films whose characters originated in those comics.

== English, French, Japanese ==
As some languages and forms have been extensively adapted into films, they have their own entries:

- List of films based on English-language comics
- List of films based on French-language comics
- List of films based on manga

== Other languages ==
=== Basque ===
- Black Is Beltza (2018)
- Black Is Beltza II: Ainhoa (2022)
- Gartxot, konkista aitzineko konkista (2011)
- Irati (2022)

=== Bengali ===
- Nonte Fonte (2023)
- Rappa Roy & Full Stop Dot Com (2025)

=== Chinese (Cantonese) ===
- Black Mask
  - Black Mask (1996)
  - Black Mask 2: City of Masks (2002)
- Dragon Tiger Gate (2006)
- Feel 100% (1996)
- Feel 100%... Once More (1996)
- Feel 100% II (2001)
- Feel 100% 2003 (2003)
- A Man Called Hero (1999)
- Storm Rider Clash of the Evils (2009)
- The Storm Riders (1998)
- The Storm Warriors (2009)
- Young and Dangerous (1996)

=== Chinese (Mandarin) ===
- Go Away Mr. Tumor (2015)
- A Jewish Girl in Shanghai (2010)
- Rock Dog (2016)
- Zombie Brother (TBA)

=== Czech ===
- Alois Nebel (2011)
- The Cunning Little Vixen:
  - The Cunning Little Vixen (1995)
  - The Cunning Little Vixen (2003)
- Čtyřlístek ve službách krále (2013)
- Pepina Rejholcová (1932)
- Záhada hlavolamu (1993)

=== Danish ===
- Far til fire:
  - Father of Four (1953)
  - Father of Four in the Snow (1954)
  - Father of Four in the Country (1955)
  - Father of Four in the City (1956)
  - Father of Four and Uncle Sofus (1957)
  - Father of Four and the Wolf Cubs (1958)
  - Father of Four on Bornholm (1959)
  - Far til fire med fuld musik (1961)
  - Far til fire i højt humør (1971)
  - Far til fire - gi'r aldrig op! (2005)
  - Far til fire - i stor stil (2006)
  - Far til fire - på hjemmebane (2008)
  - Far til fire - på japansk (2010)
  - Far til fire - tilbage til naturen (2011)
  - Far til fire - til søs (2012)
  - Far til fire - Onkel Sofus vender tilbage (2014)
  - Far til fires vilde ferie (2015)
  - Far til fire - på toppen (2017)
  - Far til fire i solen (2018)
  - Far til fire og vikingerne (2020)
- Ivalu (2023, short film)
- Journey to Saturn (2008)
- Poeten og Lillemor:
  - The Poet and the Little Mother (1959)
  - Poeten og Lillemor og Lotte (1960)
  - Poeten og Lillemor i forårshumør (1961)
- Slim Slam Slum (2002)
- Valhalla:
  - Valhalla (1986)
  - Valhalla (2019)

=== Dutch ===
- Dick Bos:
  - Inbraak (1942)
  - Valsch geld (1943)
  - Moord in het Modehuis (1946)
- The Dragon That Wasn't (Or Was He?) (1983)
- Kapitein Rob en het Geheim van Professor Lupardi (2007)
- De Kiekeboes:
  - Het witte bloed (1992)
  - Misstoestanden (2000)
- De schat van de zeerover (1968)
- Sjors & Sjimmie:
  - Sjors van de Rebellenclub met vacantie (1940)
  - Sjors van de Rebellenclub (1955)
  - Sjors en Sjimmie op het Pirateneiland (1962)
  - Sjors en Sjimmie en de Gorilla (1966)
  - Sjors en Sjimmie in het Land der Reuzen (1968)
  - Sjors en Sjimmie en de Toverring (1971)
  - Sjors en Sjimmie en de Rebellen (1972)
  - Sjors en Sjimmie en het Zwaard van Krijn (1977)
- Spike and Suzy:
  - De duistere diamant (2004)
  - Luke and Lucy: The Texas Rangers (2009)
- De Terugkeer van de Wespendief (2017)
- De wederopstanding van een klootzak (2013)

=== Filipino ===
- 12 Kuba (1963)
- Alipin ng Busabos (1968)
- Alyas Palos (1961)
- Anak ng Bulkan (1959)
- Anak ng Kidlat (1959)
- Mga Anghel sa Lansangan (1959)
- Apat na Agimat (1962)
- Asintado (1959)
- Asiong Aksaya:
  - Asiong Aksaya (1977)
  - Awat na Asiong Aksaya (1979)
  - Eto na naman si Asiong Aksaya! (1980)
- Asyang ng La Loma (1963)
- Atorni Agaton:
  - Atorni Agaton: Agent Law-ko (1969)
  - Atorni Agaton: Abogadong de kampanilya (1990)
- Atsay (1978)
- Baby Face (1959)
- Barok:
  - Barok (1976)
  - Sabi barok lab ko dabiana (1978)
  - Tatay na barok (1979)
  - Barok Goes to Hong Kong (1984)
- Basahang Ginto (1952)
- Mga Batang Bangketa (1970)
- Mga Batikan (1964)
- Bella Bandida (1971)
- Berdugo (1960)
- Bitter Sweet (1969)
- Bituing Walang Ningning (1985)
- Ang Biyenang Hindi Tumatawa (1954)
- Black Jack (1966)
- Blusang Itim (1986)
- Boksingera (1956)
- Bondying:
  - Bondying (1954)
  - Tatay Na si Bondying (1955)
  - Ato ti Bondying (1973)
  - Mars Ravelo's Bondying: The Little Big Boy (1989)
- Captain Barbell:
  - Captain Barbell (1964)
  - Captain Barbell Kontra Captain Bakal (1965)
  - Captain Barbell Boom! (1973)
  - Captain Barbell (1986)
  - Captain Barbell (2003)
- Cleopakwak (1969)
- Cofradia (1953)
- Dalmacio Armas (1983)
- Darna:
  - Darna (1951)
  - Darna at ang Babaing Lawin (1952)
  - Si Darna at ang Impakta (1963)
  - Isputnik vs. Darna (1963)
  - Darna at ang Babaing Tuod (1965)
  - Darna at ang Planetman (1969)
  - Lipad, Darna, Lipad (1973)
  - Darna and the Giants (1973)
  - Darna vs. the Planet Women (1973)
  - Darna, Kuno? (1979)
  - Bira, Darna, Bira! (1979)
  - Darna and Ding (1980)
  - Darna (1991)
  - Mars Ravelo's Darna! Ang Pagbabalik (1994)
- Dayukdok (1961)
- Dimasalang (1970)
- Dingdong (1970)
- The Dormitory (1971)
- Double Cross (1960)
- Durando (1971)
- Duwag ang Sumuko (1964)
- Dyesebel:
  - Dyesebel (1953)
  - Anak ni Dyesebel (1964)
  - Dyesebel (1973)
  - Dyesebel (1978)
  - Dyesebel (1990)
  - Dyesebel (1996)
- Eva Dragon (1959)
- Galo Gimbal (1968)
- Ang Gangster at ang Birhen (1972)
- Ging (1964)
- Gorgonya (1978)
- Gorio at Tekla (1953)
- Guido Mortal (1970)
- Gumuhong bantayog (1960)
- Hagibis (1947)
- Harangan Man ng Sibat (1961)
- Hiram na Mukha (1992)
- Hugo, the Sidewalk Vendor (1962)
- I Believe (1961)
- Ifugao (1954)
- Isinumpa (1959)
- Kadenang Putik (1960)
- Kaibigan Ko'ng Sto. Niño (1967)
- Kalabog en Bosyo:
  - Kalabog en Bosyo (1959)
  - Kalabog en Bosyo Strike Again (1986)
  - Kalabog en Bosyo (1994)
- Kambal Tuko (1952)
- Ang Kampana sa Santa Quiteria (1971)
- Kampanerang Kuba (1974)
- Kapit sa Patalim (1962)
- Kapitan Tornado (1962)
- Kenkoy (1950)
- Kurdapya (1950)
- Kwatang: A Star Is Born (1967)
- Lastikman:
  - Lastik Man (1965)
  - Lastikman (2003)
  - Lastikman: Unang Banat (2004)
- Ang Lihim ni Gagamba (1964)
- Ang Limbas at ang Lawin (1967)
- Linda Mora (1959)
- Little Lucy (1961)
- Lupa sa Lupa (1960)
- Magkano ang Iyong Dangal? (1988)
- Magnong Mandurukot (1963)
- Markado (1960)
- Masikip ang Daigdig (1962)
- Ang Maton (1959)
- Nagbabagang Luha (1988)
- Ngitngit ng Pitong Whistle Bomb (1968)
- Octavia (1961)
- Paano Ba ang Mangarap? (1983)
- Padre Valiente (1971)
- Pambihirang Tatlo (1969)
- Panagupa (1969)
- Panday:
  - Ang Panday (1980)
  - Pagbabalik ng Panday (1981)
  - Ang Panday: Ikatlong Yugto (1982)
  - Ang Panday IV: Ika-Apat Na Aklat (1984)
  - Dugo ng Panday (1993)
  - Hiwaga ng Panday (1998)
  - Ang Panday (2009)
  - Ang Panday 2 (2011)
  - Ang Panday (2017)
- Pasan Ko ang Daigdig (1987)
- Paula (1969)
- Pedrong Hunyango (1965)
- Pieta (1983)
- Pistolero (1966)
- Pitong Gatang (1959)
- Pitong Sagisag (1961)
- Pobresita (1959)
- Pomposa (1968)
- Pusakal (1957)
- Ripleng de Rapido (1963)
- Roberta (1951)
- Rolling Rockers (1959)
- Rosa Mistica (1988)
- Rosa Rossini (1959)
- Rowena (1969)
- Sakay and Moy (1963)
- Sakristan Mayor (1961)
- Sandra (1959)
- Ang Sawa sa Lumang Simboryo (1952)
- Sibad (1967)
- Sidra (1966)
- La Sombra: Ang Anino (1966)
- Sugapa (1963)
- Super Gee (1973)
- Tacio (1963)
- Tagisan ng mga Agimat (1965)
- Talahib (1963)
- Talusaling (1955)
- Tanikalang Apoy (1959)
- Tatak (1959)
- Tatlong Baraha (1961)
- Tatlong Magdalena (1960)
- Thor (1962)
- Tiagong Lundag (1966)
- Tisoy:
  - Tisoy (1969)
  - Tisoy! (1977)
- Tough Guy (1959)
- Tubog sa Ginto (1971)
- Tuko sa Madre Kakaw (1959)
- Tulisan (1962)
- Uhaw (1970)
- Ukala: Ang walang suko (1954)
- Vengativo (1961)
- El Vibora (1972)
- Zsazsa Zaturnnah Ze Moveeh (2006)
- Zuma:
  - Zuma (1985)
  - Anak ni Zuma (1988)

=== Finnish ===
- Fingerpori (2019)
- Pekka and Pätkä:
  - Pekka Puupää (1953)
  - Pekka Puupää kesälaitumilla (1953)
  - Pekka ja Pätkä lumimiehen jäljillä (1954)
  - Pekka ja Pätkä puistotäteinä (1955)
  - Kiinni on ja pysyy (1955)
  - Pekka ja Pätkä pahassa pulassa (1955)
  - Pekka ja Pätkä ketjukolarissa (1957)
  - Pekka ja Pätkä salapoliiseina (1957)
  - Pekka ja Pätkä sammakkomiehinä (1957)
  - Pekka ja Pätkä Suezilla (1958)
  - Pekka ja Pätkä miljonääreinä (1958)
  - Pekka ja Pätkä mestarimaalareina (1959)
  - Pekka ja Pätkä neekereinä (1960)
  - Pekka & Pätkä ja tuplajättipotti (1985)
  - Pekka Puupää poliisina (1986)

=== German ===
- The Abrafaxe – Under The Black Flag (2001)
- Der bewegte Mann (1994)
- Ever After (2018)
- Globi and the Stolen Shadows (2003)
- Killer Condom (1996)
- Das Kleine Arschloch:
  - Kleines Arschloch (1997)
  - Das kleine Arschloch und der alte Sack – Sterben ist Scheiße (2006)
- Kommando Störtebeker (2001)
- Lisístrata (2002)
- Lilli (1958)
- Max and Moritz:
  - Spuk mit Max und Moritz (1951)
  - Max and Moritz (1956)
  - Die fromme Helene (1965)
  - Wilhelm Busch – Die Trickfilm-Parade: Max und Moritz und andere Streiche (1978)
- Nick Knatterton:
  - Nick Knatterton's Adventure (1959)
  - Nick Knatterton – Der Film (2002)
- Papa Moll (2017)
- Tobias Knopp – Abenteuer eines Junggesellen (1950)
- Wendy
  - Wendy – Der Film (2017)
  - Wendy 2 – Freundschaft für immer (2018)
- Werner:
  - Werner – Beinhart! (1990)
  - Werner: Eat My Dust!!! (1996)
  - Werner – Volles Rooäää!!! (1999)
  - Werner – Gekotzt wird später! (2003)
  - Werner – Eiskalt! (2011)

=== Hindi ===
- Sons of Ram (2012)
- Motu Patlu in Wonderland! (2012, TV film)
- Savita Bhabhi (2013, Web film)
- Motu Patlu: In Alien World! (2016, TV film)
- Motu Patlu: King of Kings (2016)
- Motu Patlu in the City of Gold (2018)

=== Indonesian ===
- Eggnoid: Cinta & Portal Waktu (2019)
- Gundala Putra Petir:
  - Gundala Putra Petir (1981)
  - Gundala (2019)
- Terlalu Tampan (2019)

=== Italian ===
- 5 Is the Perfect Number (2019)
- Ada dans la jungle (1988)
- Avenger X (1967)
- Baba Yaga (1973)
- La Banda Grossi (2018)
- Biancaneve & Co. (1982)
- Courageous Captain Swing (1971)
- Corto Maltese:
  - Corto Maltese: The Ballad of the Salt Sea (2002)
  - Corto Maltese in South America (2002)
  - Corto Maltese: Heads and Mushrooms (2002)
  - Corto Maltese: Celtic Suite (2002)
  - Corto Maltese and the Ethiopian (2002)
  - Corto Maltese in Siberia (2002)
  - Corto Maltese and the Gilded House of Samarkand (2002)
- The Click (1985)
- Dampyr (2022)
- Diabolik
  - Danger: Diabolik (1968)
  - Diabolik (2021)
  - Diabolik: Ginko Attacks! (2022)
  - Diabolik: Who Are You? (2023)
- Dylan Dog:
  - Cemetery Man (1994)
  - Dylan Dog: Dead of Night (2011)
  - Vittima degli eventi (2014, short film)
- Estigmas (2010)
- Isabella:
  - Ms. Stiletto (1969)
  - Zenabel (1969)
- I'm Still Alive (TBA)
- Jesuit Joe (1991)
- Kriminal:
  - Kriminal (1966)
  - Il marchio di Kriminal (1968)
- The Last Man on Earth (2011)
- Monolith (2016)
- Non chiamarmi Omar (1992)
- Oltretomba:
  - Bloody Sin (2011)
  - Catacomba (2016)
  - Deep Red (1975)
  - Murder Obsession (1981)
- Orfeo (2025)
- Le Parfum de l'Invisible (1997)
- Paz! (2002)
- Princess Cinderella (1941)
- La profezia dell'armadillo (2018)
- Satanik (1968)
- Sturmtruppen:
  - Sturmtruppen (1976)
  - Sturmtruppen 2 - Tutti al fronte (1982)
  - Kakkientruppen (1977)
- La terra dei figli (2021)
- Tex and the Lord of the Deep (1985)
- Thrilling (1965)
- Zagor:
  - Zagor - Kara Bela (1971)
  - Zagor kara korsan'in hazineleri (1971)
- Zora the Vampire (2000)

=== Korean ===
- 26 Years (2012)
- Apt. (2006)
- Beat (1997)
- Blade of the Phantom Master (2004)
- Blades of Blood (2010)
- The Cat Funeral (2015)
- Dasepo Naughty Girls (2006)
- Fashion King (2014)
- Fists of Legend (2013)
- The Five (2013)
- Le Grand Chef (2007)
- Le Grand Chef 2: Kimchi Battle (2010)
- Hello, Schoolgirl (2008)
- Inside Men (2015)
- Late Blossom (2011)
- Miracle of a Giving Fool (2008)
- Moss (2010)
- Mr. Go (2013)
- The Neighbors (2012)
- Pained (2011)
- Priest (2011)
- Secretly, Greatly (2013)
- So I Married An Anti-fan (2016)
- Tazza: The High Rollers (2006)
- Tazza: The Hidden Card (2014)
- Tazza: One Eyed Jack (2019)
- Timing (2014)

=== Luxembourgish ===
- De Superjhemp retörns (2018)

=== Malayalam ===
- Bobanum Moliyum (1971)

=== Norwegian ===
- Bustenskjold (1958)
- Free Jimmy (2006)
- Ninjababy (2021)

=== Polish ===
- George the Hedgehog (2011)
- Tytus, Romek i A’Tomek wśród złodziei marzeń (2002)

=== Portuguese ===
- O Doutrinador (Brazil, 2018)
- O Judoka (Brazil, 1973)
- O Menino Maluquinho (Brazil):
  - Menino Maluquinho - O Filme (1995)
  - Menino Maluquinho 2 - A Aventura (1997)
- Monica's Gang (Brazil):
  - As Aventuras da Turma da Mônica (1982)
  - A Princesa e o Robô (1983)
  - Cine Gibi: O Filme (2004)
  - Monica's Gang in an Adventure in Time (2007)
  - Turma da Mônica: Laços (2019)
  - Turma da Mônica: Lições (2021)
- O Quim e o Manecas (Portugal, 1916)
- Rocky & Hudson (Brazil, 1994)
- Tungstênio (Brazil, 2018)
- Wood & Stock: Sexo, Orégano e Rock'n'Roll (Brazil, 2006)
- Yakuza Princess (Brazil, 2021)

=== Russian ===
- Major Grom (2017, short film)
- Major Grom: Plague Doctor (2021)
- Grom: Boyhood (2023)

=== Serbian ===
- Billy the Spit (1986)
- City Cat (1991, TV short film)
- Mirko i Slavko (1973)
- Technotise: Edit & I (2009)

=== Spanish ===
- Alma Grande (Mexico):
  - Alma Grande (1966)
  - Alma Grande en el desierto (1967)
- Anacleto: agente secreto (Spain, 2015)
- Atolladero (Spain, 1995)
- Las aventuras de Hijitus (Argentina, 1973)
- Aventuras de Molécula y el Canguro Boxy (Spain, 1976)
- Las Aventuras de Pinín y sus amigos (Spain, 1979)
- Avivato (Argentina, 1949)
- Beto Nervio contra las fuerzas del mal (Argentina, 1979)
- Birdboy: The Forgotten Children (Spain, 2015)
- Boogie (Argentina, 2009)
- Boystown (Spain, 2007)
- Buñuel in the Labyrinth of the Turtles (Spain, 2018)
- Calzonzin Inspector (Mexico, 1973)
- El caballero del antifaz (Spain, 2010)
- El Capitán Trueno y el Santo Grial (Spain, 2011)
- La casa (Spain, 2024)
- Cazador (Argentina):
  - Cazador, la película (2019)
- Chanoc (Mexico):
  - Chanoc (1967)
  - Chanoc en las garras de las fieras (1970)
  - Chanoc en las tarántulas (1971)
  - Chanoc contra el tigre y el vampiro (1972)
  - Chanoc en el foso de las serpientes (1974)
  - Chanoc en la isla de los muertos (1975)
  - Chanoc en el circo union (1979)
  - Chanoc y el hijo del Santo contra los vampiros asesinos (1981)
- Cindy la regia (Mexico, 2020)
- La clínica del Dr. Cureta (Argentina, 1987)
- Condorito: La Película (Chile, 2017)
- Don Fulgencio (Argentina, 1950)
- Dream Team (Spain):
  - Of Love and Lies (France, 2019)
- Fúlmine (Argentina, 1949)
- La furgo (Spain, 2025)
- Gaturro (Argentina, 2010)
- Goomer (Spain, 1999)
- Hermelinda Linda (Mexico):
  - Hermelinda Linda (1984)
  - Agente 0013: Hermelinda Linda 2 (1986)
- Historias de la puta mili (Spain):
  - Historias de la puta mili (1993)
  - La muerte de Arensivia (2005)
- Isidoro: la película (2007), from Isidoro Cañones (Argentina)
- Lindor Covas, el cimarrón (Argentina, 1963)
- Mafalda (Argentina, 1982)
- Makinavaja (Spain):
  - Makinavaja, el último choriso (1992)
  - Semos peligrosos (uséase Makinavaja 2) (1993)
- Marco Antonio: Rescate en Hong Kong (Spain, 2000)
- María Isabel (Mexico):
  - María Isabel (1967)
  - El amor de María Isabel (1968)
- María y yo (Spain, 2010)
- Memorias de un hombre en pijana (Spain, 2019)
- Mort & Phil (Spain):
  - Mort and Phil's First Festival (1969)
  - Mort and Phil's Second Festival (1969)
  - Mortadelo & Filemon: The Big Adventure (2003)
  - Mortadelo and Filemon. Mission: Save the Planet (2008)
- Neuroworld (Spain, 2014)
- Ogu and Mampato in Rapa Nui (Chile, 2002)
- Pancho Talero (Argentina):
  - Las aventuras de Pancho Talero (1929)
  - Pancho Talero en la prehistoria (1930)
  - Pancho Talero en Hollywood (1931)
- El Payo (Mexico):
  - El Payo - Un hombre contra el mundo (1972)
  - Los caciques (1975)
  - La montaña del diablo (1975)
- Patoruzito (Argentina):
  - Patoruzito (2004)
  - Patoruzito: La gran aventura (2006)
- Percal (Mexico):
  - El infierno de los pobres (1951)
  - Perdición de mujeres (1951)
  - Hombres sin alma (1951)
- Piantadino (Argentina, 1950)
- Polar (Spain, 2019)
- Las puertitas del Sr. López (Argentina, 1988)
- Rarotonga (Mexico, 1978)
- Rubí (Mexico, 1970)
- The Silent War (Spain, 2019)
- Superlópez (Spain):
  - Superlópez (2003, short film)
  - Superlópez (2018)
- Los Supersabios (Mexico, 1978)
- Tigre Callejero (Spain, 2021)
- Virus Tropical (Columbia, 2017)
- Wrinkles (Spain, 2011)
- Yesenia (Mexico, 1971)
- Yor, the Hunter from the Future (Argentina, 1983)
- Zipi y Zape (Spain):
  - Las aventuras de Zipi y Zape (1981)
  - Zip & Zap and the Marble Gang (2013)
  - Zip & Zap and the Captain's Island (2016)
- Zonga, el ángel diabólico (Mexico, 1958)

=== Swedish ===
- 47:an Löken:
  - 47:an Löken (1971)
  - 47:an Löken blåser på (1972)
- Alena (2015)
- Bamse:
  - Bamse and the City of Thieves (2014)
  - Bamse and the Witch's Daughter (2016)
  - Bamse och dunderklockan (2018)
  - Bamse och vulkanön (2021)
  - Bamse och världens minsta äventyr (2023)
  - Bamse och havets hemlighet (2025)
- Biffen och Bananen:
  - Biffen och Bananen (1951)
  - Blondie, Beef and the Banana (1952)
  - Klarar Bananen Biffen? (1957)
- Eva & Adam:
  - Eva & Adam – fyra födelsedagar och ett fiasko (2001)
  - Eva & Adam (2021)
- Harald Handfaste (1946)
- Kronblom:
  - Kronblom (1947)
  - Kronblom kommer till stan (1949)
- Mandel Karlsson:
  - 91:an Karlsson. "Hela Sveriges lilla beväringsman" (1946)
  - 91:an Karlssons permis (1947)
  - 91 Karlssons bravader (1951)
  - Alla tiders 91 Karlsson (1953)
  - 91 Karlsson rycker in (1955)
  - 91:an Karlsson slår knock out (1957)
  - 91:an Karlsson muckar (tror han) (1959)
  - 91:an och generalernas fnatt (1977)
- Moomins on the Riviera (2014)
- Påhittiga Johansson (1950)
- Rosa: The Movie (2007)
- We Are the Best! (2013)

=== Thai ===
- 13 Beloved (2006)
- 13 Sins (2014)
- Noo Hin: The Movie (2006)

=== Turkish ===
- Bad Cat (2016)
- Kara Murat Şeyh Gaffar'a Karşı (1976)
- Karaoğlan:
  - Karaoğlan – Altay'dan Gelen Yiğit (1965)
  - Karaoğlan – Baybora'nın Oğlu (1966)
  - Karaoğlan – Camoka'nın İntikamı (1966)
  - Karaoğlan – Bizanslı Zorba (1967)
  - Karaoğlan – Yeşil Ejder (1967)
  - Karaoğlan – Samara Şeyhin Kızı (1969)
  - Karaoğlan Geliyor (1972)
  - Karaoğlan (2013)
- The Last Ottoman (2007)
- Malkoçoğlu
  - Malkoçoğlu (1966)
  - Malkoçoğlu: Krallara Karşı (1967)
  - Malkoçoğlu: Kara Korsan (1968)
  - Malkoçoğlu: Akıncılar Geliyor (1969)
  - Malkoçoğlu Cem Sultan (1969)
  - Malkoçoğlu: Ölüm Fedaileri (1971)
  - Malkoçoğlu: Kurt Bey (1973)
- Tarkan:
  - Tarkan (1969)
  - Tarkan: Gümüş Eyer (1970)
  - Tarkan Versus the Vikings (1971)
  - Tarkan: Altın Madalyon (1972)
  - Tarkan: Güçlü Kahraman (1973)

== highest grossing comic book adaptation ==
The following is a list of the highest grossing comic book films of all time. Superhero films, comic strips and manga adaptations are not included as they have their own list. See List of highest-grossing superhero films, Highest-grossing comic strip films and Highest-grossing Manga films are not included however graphic novels are included.

Asterix is the most frequent franchise with 4 films on the list, 2014 is the most frequently year with 6 films.

Dark Horse Comics is the most frequent comic companies with 5 films.

All had a theatrical run (including re-releases) since 1985. Films that have not played since then do not appear on the chart due to ticket price inflation, population size, and ticket purchasing trends not being considered.

Rank	Film	Worldwide gross	Year	Comic book	Source	Ref
1	Men in Black 3	$654,213,485	2012	The Men in Black	Malibu Comics	
2	Men in Black	$589,390,539	1997	The Men in Black	Malibu Comics	
3	The Smurfs	$563,892,376	2011	The Smurfs	Le Lombard	
4	300	$456,068,181	2007	300	Dark Horse Comics	
5	Men in Black II	$441,818,803	2002	The Men in Black	Malibu Comics	
6	Kingsman: The Secret Service	$414,351,546	2014	Kingsman	Image Comics	
7	Kingsman: The Golden Circle	$410,902,662	2017	Kingsman	Image Comics	
8	Edge of Tomorrow	$381,055,527	2014	All You Need Is Kill	Shueisha	
9	The Adventures of Tintin	$373,994,233	2011	The Adventures of Tintin	Casterman	
10	The Smurfs 2	$347,545,360	2013	The Smurfs	Le Lombard	
11	Wanted	$342,463,063	2008	Wanted	Dark Horse Comics	
12	300: Rise of an Empire	$337,580,051	2014	300	Dark Horse Comics	
13	Men in Black: International	$253,890,701	2019	The Men in Black	Malibu Comics	
14	The Bad guys	$250,387,888	2022	The Bad Guys	Scholastic Corporation	
15	Hercules	$244,819,862	2014	Hercules	Radical Comics	
16	The Bad Guys 2	$239,761,056	2026	the bad guys	Scholastic	
17	Valerian and the City of a Thousand Planets	$225,874,228	2017	Valérian and Laureline	Dargaud	
18	Red	$199,006,387	2010	Red	WildStorm	
19	Smurfs: The Lost Village	$197,183,546	2017	The Smurfs	Le Lombard	
20	Road to Perdition	$181,001,478	2002	Road to Perdition	Paradox Press	
21	Alien vs. Predator	$177,427,090	2004	Aliens vs. Predators	Dark Horse Comics	
22	Sin City	$158,733,820	2005	Sin City	Dark Horse Comics	
23	Red 2	$148,075,565	2013	Red	WildStorm	
24	V for Vendetta	$134,686,457	2013	2006	V for Vendetta	Quality Communications
25	2 Guns	$131,940,411	2 Gun	Boom! Studios		
26	Asterix at the Olympic Games	$131,856,927	2008	Asterix	Dargaud	
27	Asterix & Obelix: Mission Cleopatra	$131,116,046	2002	Asterix	Dargaud	
28	Aliens vs. Predator: Requiem	$130,290,885	2007	Aliens vs. Predator	Dark Horse Comics	
29	The King's Man	$125,897,478	2021	Kingsman	Image Comics	
30	Smurfs	$123,700,574	2025	The Smurfs	Le Lombard	
31	Surrogates	$122,444,772	2009	The Surrogates	Top Shelf Productions	
32	Timecop	$101,646,581	1994	Timecop	Dark Horse Comics	
33	Asterix and Obelix vs. Caesar	$101 644 060	Asterix	Dargaud	1999	
34	Atomic Blonde	$100,014,025	2017	The Coldest City	Oni Press	
35	Argylle	$96,221,061	2024	Kingsman	Image Comics	
36	Old	$90,146,510	2021	Sandcastle	Atrabile	
37	R.I.P.D.	$78,324,220	2013	Rest in Peace Department	Dark Horse Comics	
38	I, Frankenstein	$76,801,179	2014	I, Frankenstein	Kevin Grevioux	
39	30 Days of Night	$75,513,170	2007	30 Days of Night	IDW	
40	From Hell	$74,558,115	2001	From Hell	Knockabout Comics	
41	Inside Man	$61,653,908	2015	The Insiders	Yoon Tae-ho	
42	A History of Violence	$61,385,065	2005	A History of Violence	DC Comics	
43	Asterix and Obelix: God Save Britannia	$61,319,383	2012	Asterix	Dargaud	
44	Houba! On the Trail of the Marsupilami	$57,988,550	2012	Marsupilami	Dupuis	
45	Scott Pilgrim vs. the World	$51,691,156	2010	Scott Pilgrim		
46	Marry Me	$50,541,093	2022	Marry Me		
47	Asterix: The Secret of the Magic Potion	$48,288,456	2018	Asterix	Dargaud	
48	Sin City: A Dame to Kill For	$39,407,616	2014	A Dame to Kill For	Dark Horse Comics	
50	Tazza: The High Rollers	$39,243,317	Tazza: The High Rollers	Tazza: The High Rollers	2012	

== See also ==
- Superhero film
- List of American superhero films
- List of films based on comic strips
- List of comic-based films directed by women

Also related:

- Lists of film source material
- List of comics based on films
- List of films based on radio series
- List of films based on fiction works
- List of films based on television programs
- List of television programs based on comics

== Bibliography ==
- Curti, Roberto (2016). Diabolika: Supercriminals, Superheroes and the Comic Book Universe in Italian Cinema. Midnight Marquee Press. ISBN 9781936168606.
