= Father of Four (film) =

- Front cover of the Danish DVD
- Directed by: Alice O'Fredericks; Robert Saaskin
- Written by: Lis Byrdal; Kaj Engholm (cartoon)
- Produced by: Lau Lauritzen Jr.; Henning Karmark
- Starring: Ib Schønberg; Birgitte Bruun
- Cinematography: Rudolf Frederiksen
- Edited by: Wera Iwanouw
- Music by: Sven Gyldmark
- Distributed by: ASA Filmudlejning
- Release date: 2 November 1953
- Running time: 97 min.
- Country: Denmark
- Language: Danish

Father of Four (Danish: Far til Fire) is a 1953 Danish family comedy directed by Alice O'Fredericks and starring Ib Schønberg and Birgitte Bruun. The film is based on the comic strip by Kaj Engholm and Olav Hast. It was the inaugural film in a series of eight Father of Four films made by ASA Films, one each year from 1953 to 1961.

== Cast ==
- Ib Schønberg as Father; Schønberg also played the role in the first sequel, but died before they could finish any further films. He was replaced by Karl Stegger in the next six films. Niels Olsen plays the father in the reimagined series of the 2000s.
- Birgitte Bruun as Søs; Bruun, later known as Birgitte Price, played the part in the first six films.
- Rudi Hansenas Mie
- Otto Møller Jensen as Ole; Jensen played the role in all of the first films and then left acting for fashion design.
- Ole Neumann as Little Per; Neumann was 5 years old when he played Per, and played the same role in each of the first seven sequels. He later became a documentary cinematographer
- Peter Malberg as Uncle Anders; Buster Larsen played the role of Uncle Anders in subsequent sequels
- Jørgen Reenberg as Teacher Jørgen Stæhr
- Ove Sprogøe as Baker Høst
- Sigurd Langberg as Director Andersen
- Ib Mossin as Peter
- Paul Hagen as Burglar
- Ilselil Larsen as Grete
- Agnes Rehni as Mrs. Sejersen
- Svend Aage Madsen as Kristian
- Else Jarlbak as Kristian's Mother
- Poul Reichhardt as himself
- Einar Juhl as Pastor
- Svend Bille as Train Conductor
- Hugo Herrestrup
- Poul Thomsen

== Production ==
In 1947, Hakon Steffensen, editor of the Politiken newspaper wanted to start running a comic strip that depicted typical Danish life. It was his response to the surge of American comic strips flooding the European marketplace in the post-war years. Steffensen asked cartoonist Kaj Engholm for ideas. Engholm then asked his friend, advertising executive Olav Hast, who proposed the idea. They roughed out the story together of a single father of four children with the oldest daughter running the household, agreeing the father would be a single parent without ever creating a backstory for the mother's absence. In interviews, whenever the authors were asked, "Where is the mother?", they replied, "I don't know but we promise to look into it."

The comic strip first appeared in 1948 and ran daily for 40 years—on the back page of Politiken until 1955, then in the Berlingske Tidende newspaper until 1988. The text was written by Hast until retired from the strip in 1973, after which it was written by a variety of writers. Engholm drew the strip until his death in 1988.

== Sequels ==
Father of Four was such an enormous success that a sequel Father of Four in the Snow (Far til fire i sneen) was quickly made and released in 1954. Thereafter, seven more sequels were made, one every year until 1961, all directed by Alice O'Fredericks. A ninth film was planned for release in 1962 but was never produced.

In 2005, the series was renewed with the release of Father of Four is Back (Far til fire - gi'r aldrig op) directed by Claus Bjerre and in 2006 with Father of Four: Living Large (Far til fire - i stor stil).

Year	Title	Original title	Notes
1954	Father of Four in the Snow	Far til fire i sneen	directed by Alice O'Fredericks
1955	Father of Four in the Country	Far til fire på landet	directed by Alice O'Fredericks
1956	Father of Four in the City	Far til fire i byen	directed by Alice O'Fredericks
1957	Father of Four and Uncle Sofus	Far til fire og onkel Sofus	directed by Alice O'Fredericks
1958	Father of Four and the Wolf Cubs	Far til fire og ulveungerne	directed by Alice O'Fredericks
1959	Father of Four on Bornholm	Far til fire på Bornholm	directed by Alice O'Fredericks
1961	Father of Four with Full Music	Far til fire med fuld musik	directed by Alice O'Fredericks
1971	Father of Four in Good Humor	Far til fire i højt humør	directed by Ib Mossin
2005	Father of Four Never Gives Up	Far til fire - gi'r aldrig op	directed by Claus Bjerre
2006	Father of Four: Living Large	Far til fire - i stor stil	directed by Claus Bjerre
2008	Father of Four: Home Field Advantage	Far til fire - på hjemmebane	directed by Claus Bjerre
2010	Father of Four on Japanese	Far til fire - på japansk	directed by Claus Bjerre
2011	Father of Four Back in the Nature	Far til fire - tilbage til naturen	directed by Claus Bjerre
2012	Father of Four to Seas	Far til fire - til søs	directed by Claus Bjerre
2014	Father of Four Uncle Sofus Returns	Far til fire - Onkel Sofus vender tilbage	directed by Giacomo Campeotto
2015	Father of Fours Wild Vacation	Far til fires vilde ferie	directed by Giacomo Campeotto
2017	Father of Four On The Top	Far til fire - på toppen	directed by Martin Miehe-Renard
2018	Father of Four In The Sun	Far til fire i solen	directed by Martin Miehe-Renard
2020	Father of Four and the Vikings	Far til fire og vikingerne	directed by Martin Miehe-Renard
