= Det skete på Møllegården =

1960 film

- Film poster
- Directed by: Alice O'Fredericks; Robert Saaskin
- Written by: Jon Iversen; Morten Korch; Alice O'Fredericks
- Produced by: Henning Karmark
- Starring: Poul Reichhardt
- Cinematography: Rudolf Frederiksen
- Edited by: Wera Iwanouw
- Music by: Sven Gyldmark
- Distributed by: ASA Film
- Release date: 19 December 1960
- Running time: 108 minutes
- Country: Denmark
- Language: Danish

Det skete på Møllegården is a 1960 Danish family film directed by Alice O'Fredericks and Robert Saaskin.

== Cast ==
- Poul Reichhardt - Martin Poulsen
- Christian Arhoff - Mikkel Vind
- Ib Mossin - Anders
- Astrid Villaume - Anna Kjeldsen
- Lisbeth Movin - Martha
- Helga Frier - Mathilde
- Else Hvidhøj - Marie Kjeldsen
- Jørn Jeppesen - Bertel Simonsen
- Hans W. Petersen - Søren Fedthas
- Bertel Lauring - Jesper
- Anker Taasti - Carlo
- Freddy Koch - Customs Assistant Petersen
- Ove Rud - Customs Assistant Jørgensen
- Knud Hallest - Gårdejer Kjeldsen
- Knud Schrøder - Gunnar Kjeldsen
- Christian Brochorst - Innkeeper
- Kurt Erik Nielsen - Customs security
- Niels Thor - Assistant
- Anne Margrethe - Dorte
- Ole Neumann - Claus
- Niels Brochorst
- Hugo Herrestrup - Maries boyfriend
