= Flintesønnerne =

1956 film

- Film poster
- Directed by: Alice O'Fredericks
- Written by: Grete Frische; Morten Korch
- Produced by: Henning Karmark
- Starring: Poul Reichhardt
- Cinematography: Rudolf Frederiksen
- Edited by: Wera Iwanouw
- Music by: Sven Gyldmark
- Distributed by: ASA Film
- Release date: 21 December 1956
- Running time: 105 minutes
- Country: Denmark
- Language: Danish

Flintesønnerne is a 1956 Danish family film directed by Alice O'Fredericks.

== Cast ==
- Poul Reichhardt as Jesper Poulsen
- Peter Malberg as Mikkel
- Ib Mossin as Viggo
- Ebbe Langberg as Martin
- Hanne Winther-Jørgensen - Karen
- Astrid Villaume as Anna
- Valdemar Skjerning as Kresten Flint
- Tove Maës as Else Flint
- Agnes Phister-Andresen as aunt Jane
- Helga Frier as Grete
- Ove Rud as Hans
- Keld Markuslund as Mads
- Einar Juhl as the Sandbjerg man
- Irene Hansen as Vera
- Per Lauesgaard as Karl
- Annelis Morten Hansen as Rikke
- Børge Møller Grimstrup as a farmer
- Mogens Juul as Jacob
- Inga Hansen
