= Sikke'n familie =

1963 film

- Directed by: Jon Iversen; Alice O'Fredericks
- Written by: Ian Hay (play); Jon Iversen; Alice O'Fredericks
- Starring: Jørgen Beck
- Cinematography: Rudolf Frederiksen; Flemming Jensen
- Edited by: Wera Iwanouw
- Music by: Sven Gyldmark
- Distributed by: ASA Film
- Release date: 12 August 1963
- Running time: 100 minutes
- Country: Denmark
- Language: Danish

Sikke'n familie is a 1963 Danish family film based upon the play by Ian Hay and directed by Jon Iversen and Alice O'Fredericks.

== Plot ==
The Winter family and maid are jewel thieves in London. It's a hobby to the dad. The son is more into counterfeiting money. The family is shocked by the son working in a bank and going straight.

== Cast ==
- Jørgen Beck as Politiinspektør John Stoke
- Bent Børgesen as Ronny Blackmore
- Charlotte Ernst as Caroline Winther
- Judy Gringer as Maggie
- Lone Hertz as Victoria Stoke
- Gunnar Lauring as James Winther
- Ib Mossin as Bill Johnson
- Lisbeth Movin as Kvinde, hos hvem der bliver begået indbrud
- Baard Owe as Peter Winther
- Poul Reichhardt as Sam Jackson
- Jessie Rindom as Ellinor Winther
- Karl Stegger as Pastor Tittaton
