= Rudi Hansen =

Danish actress (born 1943)

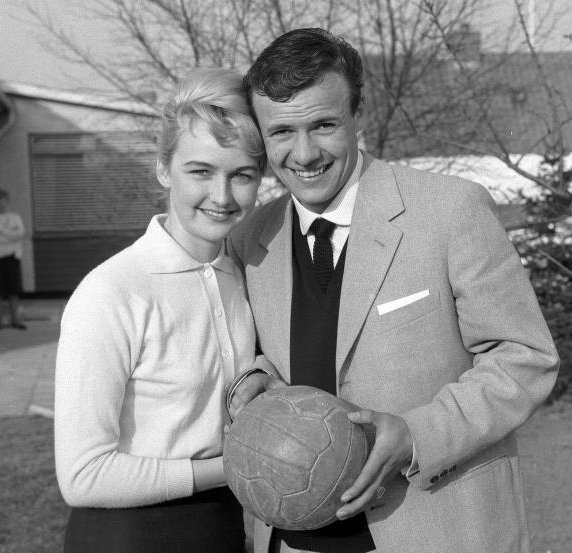
Rudi Hansen and Harald Nielsen

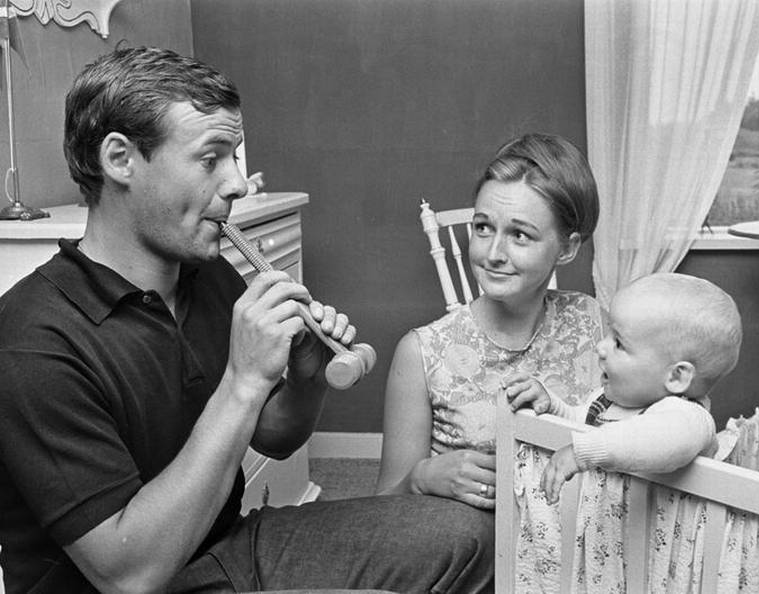
Harald Nielsen and Rudi Hansen with son Henrik in 1965

Rudi Hansen (born 27 October 1943 in Copenhagen) is a Danish former actress.

== Biography ==
Hansen is the daughter of waiter Finn Hansen (1910–1977) and revue dancer Rita Andersen Kuni (1919–1987). Aged three she took up dance and acrobatics and won national acrobatics championships in 1950–1952 and 1954. Director Alice O'Fredericks needed a girl for the role of "Mie" in the films of "Far til Fire", and chose Rudi. She was already familiar with the stage, she — and her younger sister Anisette from rock group Savage Rose – had already appeared on the Ping Club Theater at Aunt Karen. In 1950 she starred in a child role in Nørrebro Theatre as a little sister to Annie in "Annie Get Your Gun." She had been on tours in Denmark and Norway in the Valley of the Sun-The scene where she debuted 1953 in "Swing Princess". At Christmas 1957 she had the lead role in the Christmas comedy "We believe in Santa Claus" at the New Scala. In TV theater, she starred in 1955 in "oyster and pearl" in 1958 "Halloween Rene" and in 1959, "You beautiful youth." The two sisters also recorded a record together and in the movie "Father of four with full music" song Rudi Hansen "Globus song". Rudi Hansen has only appeared in two films out of "Father of Four" films, namely "Flute Player" from 1953 and "My daughter Nelly" from 1956. Among her records was "I saw Santa kissing mom", "Nisse-polka", "Sun, Summer and Sunday," "Play a polka musician", "Ole bole bum," "Girl Hearts", "Texas-swing "" A true skiffle "," Farmhouse "and" Dad ".

On 18 June 1961, she was seriously injured in a car accident at Nødebo in North Zealand, when she was a passenger of well known revue-director Sejr Volmer-Sørensen.

Her last film was "Far til Fire med fuld musik", where she met football player Harald Nielsen. They were married on 21 March 1963 at Gladsaxe Hall. Although she was to start further training as an actress and had been admitted to the New Theatre's drama school, she withdrew completely from the limelight to follow Harald to Bologna in Italy where he played professional football. Since 1974, the couple have lived in Denmark, where they have a leathergoods company, primarily importing from Italy.

Rudi (Hansen) Nielsen is also the chairwoman of Eventyr Teatret, a drama school and professional children and youth theater in Copenhagen.

== Filmography ==
Rudi Hansen has starred in the following movies:

- 1953 Far til fire
- 1953 Fløjtespilleren
- 1954 Far til fire i sneen
- 1955 Min datter Nelly
- 1955 Far til fire på landet
- 1956 Far til fire i byen
- 1957 Far til fire og onkel Sofus
- 1958 Far til fire og ulveungerne
- 1959 Far til fire på Bornholm
- 1961 Far til fire med fuld musik
- 1961 Farinelli
