= Father of Four on Bornholm =

1959 film

- Film poster
- Directed by: Alice O'Fredericks; Robert Saaskin
- Written by: Jon Iversen; Alice O'Fredericks
- Produced by: Henning Karmark; Lau Lauritzen Jr.
- Starring: Karl Stegger
- Cinematography: Rudolf Frederiksen
- Edited by: Wera Iwanouw
- Music by: Sven Gyldmark
- Distributed by: ASA Film
- Release date: 26 December 1959
- Running time: 104 minutes
- Country: Denmark
- Language: Danish

Father of Four on Bornholm (Danish: Far til fire på Bornholm) is a 1959 Danish family film directed by Alice O'Fredericks.

== Cast ==
- Karl Stegger as Far
- Else Hvidhøj as Søs
- Otto Møller Jensen as Ole
- Ole Neumann as Lille Per
- Peter Malberg as Onkel Anders
- Agnes Rehni as Fru Sejersen
- Rudi Hansen as Mie
- Christian Arhoff as Frisør
- Helmer Bonde as Torben
- Jon Iversen as Torbens bedstefar
- Preben Mahrt as Filminstruktøren
- Marianne Schleiss as Skuespillerinden Lilly
- Henrik Wiehe as Skuespilleren Allan
- Einar Juhl as Rektor
- Kirsten Passer as Lærerinde
- Minna Jørgensen as Frk. Kofoed
- Henry Nielsen as Fisker
- Ib Mossin as Peter
