= Ove Rud =

Danish actor (1923–2007)

- Born: 16 December 1923; Copenhagen, Denmark
- Died: 21 September 2007 (aged 83); Denmark
- Occupation: Actor
- Years active: 1950–2000

Ove Rud (16 December 1923 – 21 September 2007) was a Danish film actor. He appeared in 21 films between 1950 and 2000. He was born in Copenhagen, Denmark and died in Denmark.

== Filmography ==
- Blinkende lygter (2000)
- Skytten (1977)
- Pas på ryggen, professor (1977)
- Mindesmærket (1972)
- Ekko af et skud (1970)
- Människor möts och ljuv musik uppstår i hjärtat (1967)
- Gys og gæve tanter (1966)
- Een pige og 39 sømænd (1965)
- Paradis retur (1964)
- Far til fire med fuld musik (1961)
- Jetpiloter (1961)
- Det skete på Møllegården (1960)
- Forelsket i København (1960)
- Sømand i knibe (1960)
- Poeten og Lillemor og Lotte (1960)
- Bundfald (1957)
- Flintesønnerne (1956)
- Ordet (1955)
- This Is Life (1953)
- Fløjtespilleren (1953)
- I gabestokken (1950)
