= De kloge og vi gale =

1945 film

- Directed by: Lau Lauritzen Jr. Alice O'Fredericks
- Written by: Svend Melsing; Svend Rindom; Paul Sarauw
- Produced by: Henning Karmark
- Starring: Poul Reumert
- Cinematography: Rudolf Frederiksen
- Edited by: Marie Ejlersen
- Music by: Sven Gyldmark
- Release date: 22 October 1945
- Running time: 97 minutes
- Country: Denmark
- Language: Danish

De kloge og vi gale is a 1945 Danish film directed by Lau Lauritzen Jr. and Alice O'Fredericks.

== Cast ==
- Poul Reumert - Jørgen Rhoders
- Anna Borg - Irene
- Poul Reichhardt - Per
- Lily Weiding - Ulla
- Lilian Ellis - Lily Lund
- Petrine Sonne - Fru Steenberg
- Ib Schønberg - Hushovmester Jochumsen
- Knud Heglund - Musikforlægger Børgesen
