= Brødrene på Uglegaarden =

1967 film

- Directed by: Ib Mossin; Alice O'Fredericks
- Written by: Morten Korch; Ib Mossin; Alice O'Fredericks
- Produced by: Finn Aabye; Ole Mølgaard Andersen; Just Betzer; Henning Karmark
- Starring: Astrid Villaume
- Cinematography: Mikael Salomon
- Edited by: Lars Brydesen
- Music by: Sven Gyldmark
- Distributed by: ASA Film
- Release date: 16 October 1967
- Running time: 100 minutes
- Country: Denmark
- Language: Danish

Brødrene på Uglegaarden is a 1967 Danish comedy film directed by Ib Mossin and Alice O'Fredericks. It was O'Fredericks final film as a director.

== Cast ==
- Astrid Villaume - Dora
- Kjeld Jacobsen - Anders, the Innkeeper
- Bertel Lauring - Karl
- Baard Owe - Viggo
- Erik Kühnau - Thomas
- Ejner Federspiel - Christian Thorup
- Ib Mossin - Henrik Thorup
- Gunnar Lemvigh - Købmand Jespersen
- Anna-Louise Lefèvre - Birthe Jespersen
- Henry Lohmann - Lars Mathisen
- Christian Arhoff - Hans
- Helge Kjærulff-Schmidt - Landpostbud
- Karen Wegener - Sara
- Lili Heglund - Katrine
- Niels Hemmingsen - Mikkel
- Folmer Rubæk - Peter Gevær
- Marianne Kjærulff-Schmidt - Gerda
