= We Want a Child! =

1949 film

- Directed by: Lau Lauritzen Jr. Alice O'Fredericks
- Written by: Leck Fischer; Ib Freuchen; Grete Frische
- Produced by: Henning Karmark; Preben Philipsen
- Starring: Ruth Brejnholm
- Cinematography: Rudolf Frederiksen
- Edited by: Marie Ejlersen
- Music by: Sven Gyldmark
- Release date: 19 February 1949
- Running time: 97 minutes
- Country: Denmark
- Language: Danish

We Want a Child! (Danish: Vi vil ha' et barn) is a 1949 Danish drama film directed by Lau Lauritzen Jr. and Alice O'Fredericks.

== Cast ==
- Ruth Brejnholm - Else, the bride
- Jørgen Reenberg - The bridegroom
- Maria Garland - The bride's mother
- Grethe Thordahl - Jytte, the bride's friend
- Preben Lerdorff Rye - Her friend
- Jeanne Darville - The bride's cousin
- Betty Helsengreen - A proprietress
- Else Jarlbak - A businesswoman
- Karen Berg - A consultant
- Alma Olander Dam Willumsen - A midwife
- Berit Erbe - A health visitor
- Ib Schønberg - Uncle Hans
- Ib Freuchen - Doctor
