= Vagabonderne på Bakkegården =

1958 film

- Film poster
- Directed by: Alice O'Fredericks; Robert Saaskin
- Written by: Jon Iversen; Morten Korch; Alice O'Fredericks
- Produced by: Henning Karmark
- Starring: Poul Reichhardt
- Cinematography: Rudolf Frederiksen
- Edited by: Wera Iwanouw
- Music by: Sven Gyldmark
- Release date: 19 December 1958
- Running time: 100 minutes
- Country: Denmark
- Language: Danish

Vagabonderne på Bakkegården is a 1958 Danish comedy film directed by Alice O'Fredericks.

== Cast ==
- Poul Reichhardt – Martin
- Ib Mossin – Anders
- Astrid Villaume – Anna
- Ghita Nørby – Hanne
- Preben Lerdorff Rye – Jonas
- Helga Frier – Martha
- Christian Arhoff – Klinke-Hans
- Jakob Nielsen – Fodermester Volle
- Karl Stegger – Bonde
- Per Lauesgaard – Karl
- Einar Juhl – Doktor Jansen
- Ole Monty – Købmand Rasmussen
- Kirsten Passer – Inga
- Holger Hansen – Holger Fællessanger
- Irene Hansen – Servitrice
- Judy Gringer – Ung pige
- Bodil Sangill – Ung pige
- Anna Henriques-Nielsen – Frk. Jensen
- Thorkil Lauritzen – Bankbestyrer
