= Fløjtespilleren =

1953 film

- Film poster
- Directed by: Alice O'Fredericks
- Written by: Grete Frische; Morten Korch
- Produced by: Henning Karmark
- Starring: Helga Frier
- Cinematography: Rudolf Frederiksen
- Edited by: Wera Iwanouw
- Music by: Sven Gyldmark
- Release date: 18 December 1953
- Running time: 98 minutes
- Country: Denmark
- Language: Danish

Fløjtespilleren is a 1953 Danish family film directed by Alice O'Fredericks.

== Cast ==
- Helga Frier - Cirkusdirektør Karla
- Peter Malberg - Laurits 'Laust' Jeppesen
- Poul Reichhardt - Kurt / Martin Vest
- Grethe Holmer - Bodil Nielsen
- Ib Schønberg - Onkel Hans
- Ib Mossin - René
- Louis Miehe-Renard - Jack Hviid
- Jeanne Darville - Rosa 'Anita' Mogensen
- Ove Rud - Frank Otto Munk
- Jakob Nielsen - Sorte Henrik
- Thorkil Lauritzen - Sprechstallmeister
- Beatrice Bendtsen - Kvinde i merkanteri
- Ole Neumann - Dreng
- Rudi Hansen - Cirkuspige
- Otto Møller Jensen - Cirkusdreng
- Knud Hallest - Toldbetjent
- Povl Wøldike - Læge
- Irene Hansen - Marianne
- Alma Olander Dam Willumsen - Kurts mor (as Alma Olander Dam)
- Margrethe Nielsen - Fru Hviid
- Hans Egede Budtz - Kommandør
