= Taxa K 1640 efterlyses =

1956 film

- Directed by: Lau Lauritzen Jr.
- Written by: Johannes Allen
- Produced by: Henning Karmark
- Starring: Poul Reichhardt
- Cinematography: Rudolf Frederiksen
- Edited by: Wera Iwanouw
- Music by: Sven Gyldmark
- Distributed by: ASA Film
- Release date: 6 August 1956
- Running time: 96 minutes
- Country: Denmark
- Language: Danish

Taxa K 1640 efterlyses is a 1956 Danish drama film directed by Lau Lauritzen Jr. and starring Poul Reichhardt.

== Cast ==
- Lau Lauritzen Jr. as Jacob Svendsen
- Poul Reichhardt as Eigil Rasmussen
- Lisbeth Movin as Else Svendsen
- Fernanda Movin as Tante Astrid
- Paul Hagen as Spætten
- Karl Stegger as Kommoden (K-1640)
- Mogens Davidsen as Flagstangen
- Ole Monty as Sorteper
- Torkil Lauritzen as Taxa inspektør
- Birgitte Bruun as Frk. Hansen
- Kirsten Passer as Radiodame på Taxa
- Emil Hass Christensen as Overlægen
- Gunnar Lauring as Politikommissær Dyrbro
- Ebbe Langberg as Leif Rasmussen
- Bodil Steen as Taxakunde
