= Father of Four in the City =

1956 film

Far til fire i byen
- Film poster
- Directed by: Alice O'Fredericks
- Written by: Grete Frische
- Produced by: Henning Karmark
- Starring: Karl Stegger; Birgitte Bruun; Peter Malberg
- Cinematography: Rudolf Frederiksen
- Edited by: Wera Iwanouw
- Music by: Sven Gyldmark
- Distributed by: ASA Film
- Release date: 12 November 1956
- Running time: 95 minutes
- Country: Denmark
- Language: Danish

Father of Four in the City (Danish: Far til fire i byen) is a 1956 Danish family-comedy film directed by Alice O'Fredericks, and starring Karl Stegger, Birgitte Bruun and Peter Malberg.

== Cast ==
- Karl Stegger as Far
- Birgitte Bruun as Søs
- Otto Møller Jensen as Ole
- Rudi Hansen as Mie
- Ole Neumann as Lille Per
- Peter Malberg as Onkel Anders
- Ib Mossin as Peter Mortensen
- Ebbe Langberg as Erik Holm
- Agnes Rehni as Naboen Agnes Sejersen
- Einar Juhl as Rektor
- Holger Juul Hansen as Lærer
- Kirsten Passer as Lærerinde Ludvigsen
- Hans Henrik Dahl as Kjeld
- Dorte Bjørndal as Hanne
- Knud Schrøder as Fars direktør
- Carl Johan Hviid as Overbetjenten
- Bjørn Spiro as Hundeejer Jensen
- Hardy Rafn as Kalle
- Børge Møller Grimstrup as Købmanden
