= Vejrhanen =

1952 film

- Film poster
- Directed by: Lau Lauritzen Jr.
- Written by: Johannes Allen
- Produced by: Henning Karmark
- Starring: Johannes Meyer
- Cinematography: Rudolf Frederiksen
- Edited by: Wera Iwanouw
- Music by: Sven Gyldmark
- Distributed by: ASA Film
- Release date: 14 July 1952
- Running time: 99 minutes
- Country: Denmark
- Language: Danish

Vejrhanen (English: The weathercock) is a 1952 Danish family film directed by Lau Lauritzen Jr.

== Plot ==
Lektor Theodor Nielsen is a beloved schoolteacher living with his daughter Eva in the town Nipperød. When the peace is disturbed by a squeaking weathercock, Theodor sets out to return tranquility to the town.

== Cast ==
- Johannes Meyer as Theodor Nielsen
- Ilselil Larsen as Eva Nielsen
- Einar Juhl as Leo Svaneberg
- Randi Michelsen as Sigrid Svaneberg
- Sigurd Langberg as Købmand Harms
- Louis Miehe-Renard as Erik Hansen
- Valdemar Skjerning as Pastor Jerild
- Jørn Jeppesen as Advokat Ludvigsen
- Johannes Marott as Redaktør Svendesen
- Karl Stegger as Byrådsformanden
- Ejner Federspiel as Rektoren
- Helge Kjærulff-Schmidt as Klokker Larsen
- Ole Monty as Mand med madpakke
- Dirch Passer as Ekspeditionssekretær i Kirkeministeriet
- Emil Hass Christensen as Chef i Statsradiofonien
- Carl Ottosen as Ansat i Statsradiofonien
- Knud Schrøder
