= Father of Four and Uncle Sofus =

1957 film

Far til fire og onkel Sofus
- Film poster
- Directed by: Alice O'Fredericks; Robert Saaskin
- Written by: Grete Frische; Jon Iversen; Alice O'Fredericks
- Produced by: Henning Karmark
- Starring: Karl Stegger
- Cinematography: Rudolf Frederiksen
- Edited by: Wera Iwanouw
- Music by: Sven Gyldmark
- Distributed by: ASA Film
- Release date: 25 November 1957
- Running time: 89 minutes
- Country: Denmark
- Language: Danish

Father of Four and Uncle Sofus (Danish: Far til fire og onkel Sofus) is a 1957 Danish family film directed by Alice O'Fredericks.

== Cast ==
- Karl Stegger as father
- Birgitte Bruun as Søs
- Otto Møller Jensen as Ole
- Rudi Hansen as Mie
- Ole Neumann as Lille Per
- Peter Malberg as Uncle Anders / Sofus
- Ib Mossin as Peter
- Agnes Rehni as the neighbor, Agnes Sejersen
- Preben Kaas as Peter's friend
- Einar Juhl as the principal
- Kirsten Passer as Ludvigsen, a teacher
- Holger Juul Hansen as the teacher
- Henry Nielsen as a plane passenger
- Grethe Kausland as Lille Grete (as Grete Nielsen)
- Povl Wøldike as Lille Grete's father
- Åsta Hjelm as Lille Grete's mother
