= Father of Four in the Snow =

1954 film

Far til fire i sneen
- DVD cover
- Directed by: Alice O'Fredericks
- Written by: Grete Frische
- Produced by: Henning Karmark
- Starring: Ib Schønberg
- Cinematography: Rudolf Frederiksen
- Edited by: Wera Iwanouw
- Music by: Sven Gyldmark
- Distributed by: ASA Film
- Release date: 1 November 1954
- Running time: 98 minutes
- Country: Denmark
- Language: Danish

Father of Four in the Snow (Danish: Far til fire i sneen) is a 1954 Danish family film directed by Alice O'Fredericks and starring Ib Schønberg. It was produced under the ASA Film banner.

== Cast ==
- Ib Schønberg as Far
- Birgitte Bruun as Søs
- Otto Møller Jensen as Ole
- Rudi Hansen as Mie
- Ole Neumann as Lille Per
- Peter Malberg as Onkel Anders
- Agnes Rehni as Naboen Agnes Sejersen
- Preben Neergaard as Fotograf Søren Petersen
- Leif B. Hendil as Chefredaktøren
- Ib Mossin as Peter
- Einar Juhl as Rektor
- Ernst Bruun Olsen as Journalisten
- Knud Heglund as Skotsk oberst
- Georg Hansen as Søren
