= The Heir to Næsbygaard =

1965 film

- Directed by: Alice O'Fredericks
- Written by: Morten Korch; Ib Mossin; Alice O'Fredericks
- Produced by: Henning Karmark
- Starring: Asbjørn Andersen
- Cinematography: Claus Loof
- Edited by: Lars Brydesen; Ole Steen
- Music by: Sven Gyldmark
- Release date: 17 December 1965
- Running time: 99 minutes
- Country: Denmark
- Language: Danish

The Heir to Næsbygaard (Danish: Næsbygårds arving) is a 1965 Danish family film directed by Alice O'Fredericks.

== Cast ==
- Asbjørn Andersen as Godsejer Martin Kaas
- Ole Neumann as Martin
- Poul Reichhardt as Pastor Pripp
- Jane Thomsen as Rosa Pripp
- Inger Stender as Fru Pripp
- Karen Berg as Fru Helene
- Agnes Rehni as Tante Thyra
- Ib Mossin as Anker
- Henry Lohmann as Smeden Mortensen
- Sonja Oppenhagen as Elisa
- Helga Frier as Kokkepigen Marie
- Marie-Louise Coninck as Stuepigen Erna
- Bent Vejlby as Torben
- Christian Arhoff as Nick
- Ole Monty as Ole
- Peter Marcell as Forvalter Hermansen
- Valsø Holm as Skærslipper
- Bjørn Puggaard-Müller as Niels Jørgen
- Finn Nielsen as Rocker
- Ann Mariager as Pripp's datter
- Tina Mariager as Pripp's datter
