= Father of Four and the Wolf Cubs =

1958 film

Far til fire og ulveungerne
- Film poster
- Directed by: Alice O'Fredericks; Robert Saaskin
- Written by: Grete Frische; Alice O'Fredericks
- Produced by: Henning Karmark; Lau Lauritzen, Jr.
- Starring: Karl Stegger
- Cinematography: Rudolf Frederiksen
- Edited by: Wera Iwanouw
- Music by: Sven Gyldmark
- Distributed by: ASA Film
- Release date: 10 November 1958
- Running time: 93 minutes
- Country: Denmark
- Language: Danish

Father of Four and the Wolf Cubs (Danish: Far til fire og ulveungerne) is a 1958 Danish family film directed by Alice O'Fredericks and Robert Saaskin. The film has received retrospective controversy due to a song titled "A Black Little Negro From Africa".

== Cast ==
- Karl Stegger as Far
- Birgitte Bruun as Søs
- Otto Møller Jensen as Ole
- Rudi Hansen as Mie
- Ole Neumann as Lille Per
- Peter Malberg as Onkel Anders
- Ib Mossin as Peter
- Agnes Rehni as Naboen Fru Sejersen
- Grethe Kausland as Lille Grete (as Grete Nielsen)
- Einar Juhl as Rektor
- Holger Juul Hansen as Lærer
- Kirsten Passer as Lærerinden
- Annie Birgit Garde as Flokfører for ulveungerne
- Knud Schrøder as Dommer
