= Father of Four in the Country =

1955 film

Far til fire på landet
- Directed by: Alice O'Fredericks
- Written by: Grete Frische
- Produced by: Henning Karmark
- Starring: Karl Stegger
- Cinematography: Rudolf Frederiksen
- Edited by: Wera Iwanouw
- Music by: Sven Gyldmark
- Distributed by: ASA Film
- Release date: 7 November 1955
- Running time: 93 minutes
- Country: Denmark
- Language: Danish

Father of Four in the Country (Danish: Far til fire på landet) is a 1955 Danish family film directed by Alice O'Fredericks. It was produced under the ASA Film studio banner.

== Cast ==
- Karl Stegger as Far
- Birgitte Bruun as Søs
- Otto Møller Jensen as Ole
- Rudi Hansen as Mie
- Ole Neumann as Lille Per
- Peter Malberg as Onkel Anders
- Ib Mossin as Peter
- Hanne Winther-Jørgensen as Rigmor
- Louis Miehe-Renard as Lars Peter
- Hans Henrik Dahl as Kjeld
- Dorte Bjørndal as Hanne
- Marie Brink as Fru Mikkelsen
