= Grete Frische =

Danish actress, screenwriter and director

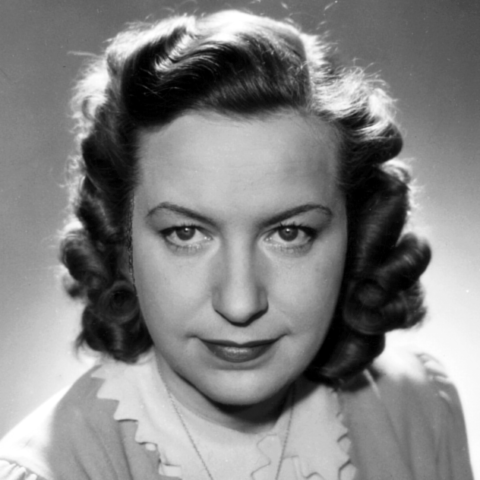
- Born: 15 June 1911; Copenhagen, Denmark
- Died: 17 August 1962 (aged 51); Denmark
- Occupations: Actress, director, writer
- Years active: 1921–1963

Grete Frische (15 June 1911 – 17 August 1962) was a Danish actress, screenwriter and director. The daughter of a playwright, Frische is best known for her screenplays, especially the war drama Støt står den danske sømand (English: The Viking Watch of the Danish Seaman) which received the 1949 Bodil Award for Best Danish Film. During a short career of less than 24 years, Frische wrote 22 produced screenplays including five of the popular Far til Fire (English: Father of Four) family comedies and two adaptations of Morten Korch novels.

== Early life ==
Frische was born in Copenhagen, Denmark, the daughter of the actor and playwright Axel Frische and Christine Jørgine Christensen. In accordance with her father's wishes, Frische began her career by studying English and History at Bedford, England rather than attending theater school. While studying in England, she met a young Burmese student, whom she married, and moved to Mandalay and Rangoon. Before the outbreak of World War II, she divorced her husband, became ill, and returned home to Denmark.

== Career ==
Shortly after her return in 1938, Frische made her stage debut at Det Ny Teater as Fedosia in Opstandelse under the direction of her father. Her theater talents were evident and she was engaged in roles at the Betty Nansen and Rialto Theaters in Copenhagen. She completed an education as a dramatist and film director at ASA and Nordisk Film companies, where she was a director's assistant to Benjamin Christensen and Emanuel Gregers, and in May 1943 she arrived at the newly established Saga Studio as a writer and film director. Frische wrote novellas and radio plays and the book Vejen til Mandaley (The Road to Mandalay), however her dramatic talent was seen best through her screenplays. Beginning in May 1945, Frische became a freelance screenwriter, working mostly for ASA Film for whom she wrote five of the Far til fire (Father of Four) family comedies. She also adapted two Morten Korch novels for the screen: Fløjtespilleren and Flintesønnerne. In 1948, Frische wrote the true war drama The Viking Watch of the Danish Seaman (Støt står den danske sømand) which she based upon the wartime diary of Kaj Frische. The film received critical acclaim and won the 1949 Bodil Award for Best Danish Film.

In the 1940s, Frische also directed several of her own stories including Kriminalassistant Bloch (Detective Bloch), En ny dag gryr (A New Day Dawns) and Så mødes vi hos Tove (We Meet at Tove's). She also performed on screen as well as in Cabaret theater shows. In the 1940s, Frische also popularized the comedy character of Snøvle-Sofie which she performed for a weekly radio program. The character was often transferred to Frische's films as a whining, but tough gossip, such as the surly housemaid she played in We Meet at Tove's.

In 1959, Frische was scheduled to perform in the film Eventyr på Mallorca (Adventure on Mallorca), but shortly after her arrival in Palma Frische became ill and needed to return home. After a long illness, she wrote a film about her life in the hospital. Frische died at the age of 51. In a career which spanned less than 24 years, Frische produced 22 screenplays, performed in 10 movies, and directed 4 films.

== Filmography ==
=== Actress ===
- Niels Pind og hans dreng (1941)
- En ny dag gryer (1945)
- Så mødes vi hos Tove (1946)
- Mosekongen (1950)
- Hold fingrene fra mor (1951)
- Unge piger forsvinder i København (1951)
- Hvad vil De ha'? (1956)
- Jomfruburet (TV) (1959)
- Eventyrrejsen (1960)
- Landsbylægen (1961)

=== Screenwriter ===
- Rasmines bryllup (1935)
- Niels Pind og hans dreng (1941)
- Kriminalassistent Bloch (1943)
- En ny dag gryer (1945)
- Så mødes vi hos Tove (1946)
- Jeg elsker en anden (1946)
- Lise kommer til byen (1947)
- I Love You Karlsson (1947)
- Støt står den danske sømand (1948)
- Vi vil ha' et barn (1949)
- Fodboldpræsten (1951)
- Fløjtespilleren (1953)
- En sømand går i land (1954)
- Far til fire i sneen (1954)
- Min datter Nelly (1955)
- Far til fire på landet (1955)
- Far til fire i byen (1956)
- Flintesønnerne (1956)
- Far til fire og onkel Sofus (1957)
- Far til fire og ulveungerne (1958)
- That Won't Keep a Sailor Down (1958)
- Eventyrrejsen (1960)

=== Director ===
- Niels Pind og hans dreng (1941)
- Moster fra Mols (1943)
- Kriminalassistent Bloch (1943)
- En ny dag gryer (1945)
- Så mødes vi hos Tove (1946)
