= The Richest Girl in the World =

The Richest Girl in the World can refer to:

- Doris Duke (1912–1993), a billionaire heiress who was dubbed "the richest girl in the world" during her lifetime
- The Richest Girl in the World (1934 film), a romantic comedy starring Miriam Hopkins and Joel McCrea
- The Richest Girl in the World (1958 film), a Danish film

== See also ==
- The Richest Girl, 1965 song by The Sweets
