= Ole Neumann =

Danish actor (1947–2025)

Ole Neumann (16 October 1947 – 25 January 2025) was a Danish child actor of the 1950s and 1960s. He died on 24 January 2025, at the age of 77.

== Filmography ==
- Far til fire (1953)
- Fløjtespilleren (1953)
- Far til fire i sneen (1954)
- Far til fire på landet (1955)
- Far til fire i byen (1956)
- Far til fire og onkel Sofus (1957)
- Far til fire og ulveungerne (1958)
- Far til fire på Bornholm (1959)
- Det skete på Møllegården (1960)
- Far til fire med fuld musik (1961)
- Kampen om Næsbygård (1964)
- Næsbygårds arving (1965)
- Krybskytterne på Næsbygård (1966)
