= Sven Gyldmark =

Danish film score composer (1904-1981)

Sven Rudolf Sidenius Gyldmark (21 April 1904 – 5 October 1981) was a Danish film score composer. He was the brother of Hugo Gyldmark and Leonard who were also composers.

== Filmography ==
- Sønnen fra vingården (1975)
- Nøddebo Præstegård (1974)
- Fætrene på Torndal (1973)
- Manden på Svanegården (1972)
- Min søsters børn når de er værst (1971)
- Far til fire i højt humør (1971)
- Guld til præriens skrappe drenge (1971)
- Hurra for de blå husarer (1970)
- Og så er der bal bagefter (1970)
- Præriens skrappe drenge (1970)
- Der kom en soldat (1969)
- Mig og min lillebror og Bølle (1969)
- Pigen fra Egborg (1969)
- Sjov i gaden (1969)
- Ta' lidt solskin (1969)
- Dyrlægens plejebørn (1968)
- Jeg – en kvinde 2 (1968)
- Mig og min lillebror og storsmuglerne (1968)
- Min søsters børn vælter byen (1968)
- Soldaterkammerater på bjørnetjeneste (1968)
- Brødrene på Uglegården (1967)
- The Reluctant Sadist (1967)
- Mig og min lillebror (1967)
- Min søsters børn på bryllupsrejse (1967)
- Nyhavns glade gutter (1967)
- Dyden går amok (1966)
- Krybskytterne på Næsbygaard (1966)
- Min søsters børn (1966)
- Een pige og 39 sømænd (1965)
- En ven i bolignøden (1965)
- Jeg – en kvinde (1965)
- Jensen længe leve (1965)
- Næsbygaards arving (1965)
- Passer passer piger (1965)
- Kampen om Næsbygaard (1964)
- Premiere i helvede (1964)
- Sikke'n familie (1963)
- Støv for alle pengene (1963)
- Det stod i avisen (1962)
- Det støver stadig (1962)
- Der brænder en ild (1962)
- Han, hun, Dirch og Dario (1962)
- Lykkens musikanter (1962)
- Rikki og mændene (1962)
- Venus fra Vestø (1962)
- Den grønne elevator (1961)
- Far til fire med fuld musik (1961)
- Løgn og løvebrøl (1961)
- Min kone fra Paris (1961)
- Peters baby (1961)
- Reptilicus (1961)
- Støv på hjernen (1961)
- Baronessen fra benzintanken (1960)
- Det skete på Møllegården (1960)
- Elefanter på loftet (1960)
- Kvindelist og kærlighed (1960)
- Sømand i knibe (1960)
- Charles' tante (1959)
- De sjove år (1959)
- Far til fire på Bornholm (1959)
- Onkel Bill fra New York (1959)
- Vi er allesammen tossede (1959)
- Far til fire og ulveungerne (1958)
- Mariannes bryllup (1958)
- Mor skal giftes (1958)
- Styrmand Karlsen (1958)
- Vagabonderne på Bakkegården (1958)
- Verdens rigeste pige (1958)
- Amor i telefonen (1957)
- Bundfald (1957)
- Der var engang en gade (1957)
- Far til fire og onkel Sofus (1957)
- Mig og min familie (1957)
- Tag til marked i Fjordby (1957)
- Tre piger fra Jylland (1957)
- Far til fire i byen (1956)
- Flintesønnerne (1956)
- Færgekroen (1956)
- Kristiane af Marstal (1956)
- Taxa K-1640 Efterlyses (1956)
- Tante Tut fra Paris (1956)
- Altid ballade (1955)
- Der kom en dag (1955)
- Det var paa Rundetaarn (1955)
- Far til fire på landet (1955)
- Gengæld (1955)
- Tre finder en kro (1955)
- Arvingen (1954)
- En sømand går i land (1954)
- Far til fire i sneen (1954)
- Hendes store aften (1954)
- I kongens klæ'r (1954)
- The Old Mill on Mols (1953)
- Far til fire (1953)
- Farlig ungdom (1953)
- Fløjtespilleren (1953)
- Ved Kongelunden (1953)
- Avismanden (1952)
- Det store løb (1952)
- Husmandstøsen (1952)
- Rekrut 67 Petersen (1952)
- Vejrhanen (1952)
- Bag de røde porte (1951)
- Det gamle guld (1951)
- Det sande ansigt (1951)
- Dorte (1951)
- Fodboldpræsten (1951)
- Hold fingrene fra mor (1951)
- Café Paradis (1950)
- De røde heste (1950)
- Den opvakte jomfru (1950)
- Historien om Hjortholm (1950)
- Mosekongen (1950)
- Den stjålne minister (1949)
- Det gælder os alle (1949)
- Vi vil ha' et barn (1949)
- Hr. Petit (1948)
- Støt står den danske sømand (1948)
- The Swedenhielm Family (1947)
- Lise kommer til byen (1947)
- Røverne fra Rold (1947)
- Hans store aften (1946)
- Jeg elsker en anden (1946)
- Så mødes vi hos Tove (1946)
- Affæren Birte (1945)
- De kloge og vi gale (1945)
- De røde enge (1945)
- Panik i familien (1945)
- Elly Petersen (1944)
- Frihed, lighed og Louise (1944)
- Teatertosset (1944)
- Det brændende spørgsmål (1943)
- Det kære København (1943)
- Drama på slottet (1943)
- Hans onsdagsveninde (1943)
- Jeg mødte en morder (1943)
- Afsporet (1942)
- Frøken Vildkat (1942)
- Lykken kommer (1942)
- Søren Søndervold (1942)
- Tyrannens fald (1942)
- Plat eller krone (1937)

== See also ==
- List of Danish composers
