= Arvingen =

1954 film

- Film poster
- Directed by: Jon Iversen; Alice O'Fredericks
- Written by: Ib Henrik Cavling; Paul Sarauw
- Produced by: Henning Karmark
- Starring: Poul Reichhardt
- Cinematography: Rudolf Frederiksen
- Edited by: Wera Iwanouw
- Music by: Sven Gyldmark
- Release date: 20 December 1954
- Running time: 92 minutes
- Country: Denmark
- Language: Danish

Arvingen is a 1954 Danish family film directed by Jon Iversen and Alice O'Fredericks.

== Cast ==
- Poul Reichhardt as Underforvalter Anders Jansen
- Astrid Villaume as Lise Bruun
- Nina Pens Rode as Else von Kipping
- William Rosenberg as Forvalter Ingolf Petersen
- Paul Hagen as Mads Olsen
- Karl Stegger as Skibsofficer
- Otto Møller Jensen as Jens
- Gunnar Lauring as Klaus Borch
- Ib Schønberg as Godsforvalter Henriksen
- Jon Iversen as Landlæge Blom
- Ingeborg Skov as Charlotte von Kipping
- Arne-Ole David as Gerhard von Kipping
- Ingolf David as Magnus von Kipping
- Marie Brink as Oline
- Julie Grønlund as Hanne
- Agnes Phister-Andresen as Fru Holst
- Knud Hallest as Kaptajn
- Asta Esper Hagen Andersen as Fru Bruun (as Asta Esper Hagen)
- Carl Johan Hviid as Gårdejer Bruun
