= The Burning Question =

1943 film

Det brændende spørgsmål
- Directed by: Alice O'Fredericks
- Written by: Svend Jensen; Thit Jensen (play); Svend Rindom
- Produced by: Jens Dennow; Henning Karmark
- Starring: Poul Reumert
- Cinematography: Rudolf Frederiksen
- Edited by: Marie Ejlersen
- Music by: Sven Gyldmark
- Release date: 25 March 1943
- Running time: 93 minutes
- Country: Denmark
- Language: Danish

The Burning Question (Danish: Det brændende spørgsmål) is a 1943 Danish drama film directed by Alice O'Fredericks and starring Poul Reumert and Grethe Holmer. Based upon the Thit Jensen's stage play, the film places serious focus on abortion and its consequences. It was one of the first Danish films to highlight the issue of women and women's rights.

== Cast ==
- Poul Reumert as Professor Eigil Thomsen
- Grethe Holmer as Aase Thomsen
- Maria Garland as Sygeplejerske / Sekretær Anina Bagge
- Richard Christensen as Overretssagfører Edvard Holm
- Katy Valentin as Fru Emilie Holm
- Poul Reichhardt as Hugo Holm
- Bodil Kjer as Bodil Kragh
- Sigrid Horne-Rasmussen as Dagmar 'Dax' Eriksen
- Carl Heger as Landsretssagfører Carsten Brandt
- Eyvind Johan-Svendsen as Politiadvokat Hannes Berg
- Peter Nielsen as Retsformand
- Clara Schwartz as Civil dommer
- Asbjørn Andersen as Dommer
