= Krybskytterne på Næsbygård =

1966 film

- Directed by: Ib Mossin; Alice O'Fredericks
- Written by: Morten Korch; Ib Mossin; Alice O'Fredericks
- Produced by: Henning Karmark
- Starring: Asbjørn Andersen
- Cinematography: Claus Loof
- Edited by: Ole Steen
- Music by: Sven Gyldmark
- Release date: 16 December 1966
- Running time: 87 minutes
- Country: Denmark
- Language: Danish

Krybskytterne på Næsbygård is a 1966 Danish family film directed by Ib Mossin and Alice O'Fredericks.

== Cast ==
- Asbjørn Andersen - Godsejer Martin Kaas
- Holger Juul Hansen - Pastor Johannes Pripp
- Inger Stender - Anna Pripp
- Jane Thomsen - Rosa Pripp
- Karen Berg - Helene
- Baard Owe - Thomas
- Helga Frier - Kokkepigen Marie
- Ib Mossin - Anker
- Ole Neumann - Martin
- Bertel Lauring - Karl
- Christian Arhoff - Nick
