= I gabestokken =

1950 film

- Directed by: Jon Iversen; Alice O'Fredericks
- Written by: Leck Fischer
- Produced by: Svend Nielsen
- Starring: Ove Rud
- Cinematography: Henning Kristiansen; Einar Olsen
- Edited by: Edith Schlüssel
- Release date: 30 October 1950
- Running time: 99 minutes
- Country: Denmark
- Language: Danish

I gabestokken is a 1950 Danish family film directed by Jon Iversen and Alice O'Fredericks.

== Cast ==
- Ove Rud - Viggo Bach
- Grethe Thordahl - Bente Bach
- Paula Illemann Feder - Viggos mor
- Jon Iversen - Kontorchefen
- Lily Broberg - Rita Hansen
- Ib Schønberg - Dr. Svenningsen
- Jørgen Reenberg - Studenten Teddy
- Preben Lerdorff Rye - Revisor Sejr
- Peter Malberg - Gamle
- Rigmor Hvidtfeldt - Magda
- Birthe Backhausen - Gerda
- Betty Helsengreen - Tykke
- Jytte Møller - Susie
- Max Ibenfeldt - Maketenderen
- Paul Møller - Jørgensen
- Lone Luther - Ebba
- Karl Gustav Ahlefeldt - Reservelægen
- Guri Richter - Sygeplejerske
- Marianne Malmquist - Kontorassistent
- Else Jarlbak - Buffetjomfru
- Thecla Boesen - Pensionatsværtsinde
