= Thecla Boesen =

Danish actress (1910–1996)

- Born: 22 August 1910; Copenhagen, Denmark
- Died: 11 February 1996 (aged 85)
- Occupation: Actress
- Years active: 1940–1982

Thecla Boesen (22 August 1910 – 11 February 1996) was a Danish film actress. She appeared in 22 films between 1940 and 1982.

== Selected filmography ==
- John og Irene (1949)
- I gabestokken (1950)
- Forelsket i København (1960)
- Magic in Town (1968)
- Hooray for the Blue Hussars (1970)
- My Sisters Children Go Astray (1971)
