= Einar Juhl =

Danish actor (1896–1982)

- Born: 8 April 1896; Copenhagen, Denmark
- Died: 1 June 1982 (aged 86); Rungsted (Hørsholm municipality), Denmark
- Occupation: Actor
- Years active: 1924–1974

Einar Juhl (8 April 1896 – 1 June 1982) was a Danish film actor. He appeared in 50 films between 1924 and 1974. He was born and died in Denmark.

== Filmography ==
- Ole Opfinders offer – 1924
- I kantonnement – 1932
- Han, hun og Hamlet – 1932
- De bør forelske Dem – 1935
- Jens Langkniv – 1940
- Damen med de lyse handsker – 1942
- De tre skolekammerater – 1944
- De røde enge – 1945
- Hans store aften – 1946
- Diskret ophold – 1946
- My name is Petersen – 1947
- Lise kommer til byen – 1947
- Tre år efter – 1948
- Den stjålne minister – 1949
- For frihed og ret – 1949
- Smedestræde 4 – 1950
- Lynfotografen – 1950
- Din fortid er glemt – 1950
- Familien Schmidt – 1951
- Det sande ansigt – 1951
- Husmandstøsen – 1952
- Vejrhanen – 1952
- Vi arme syndere – 1952
- Far til fire – 1953
- Adam og Eva – 1953
- Jan går til filmen – 1954
- Far til fire i sneen – 1954
- Gengæld – 1955
- Mod og mandshjerte – 1955
- På tro og love – 1955
- Flintesønnerne – 1956
- Far til fire i byen – 1956
- Far til fire og onkel Sofus – 1957
- Far til fire og ulveungerne – 1958
- Vagabonderne på Bakkegården – 1958
- Far til fire på Bornholm – 1959
- Frihedens pris – 1960
- Mine tossede drenge – 1961
- Far til fire med fuld musik – 1961
- Paradis retur – 1964
- Kampen om Næsbygaard – 1964
- Tine – 1964
- Mig og min lillebror – 1967
- Olsen-banden – 1968
- Det er så synd for farmand – 1968
