= Agnes Rehni =

Danish actress

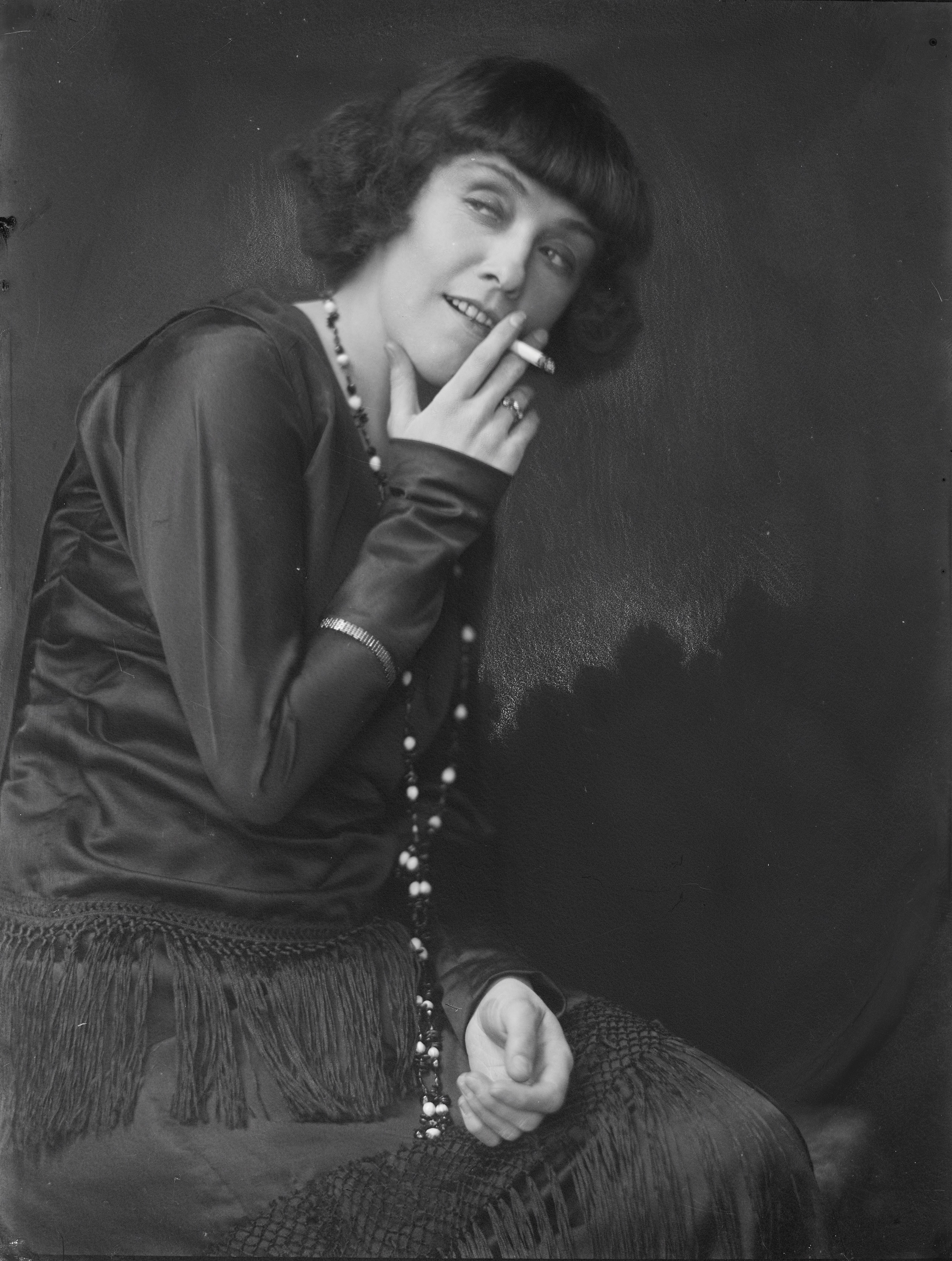
- Born: 24 May 1887; Denmark
- Died: 3 November 1966 (aged 79)

Agnes Rehni (24 May 1887 – 3 November 1966) was a Danish stage and film actress.

== Selected filmography ==
- Telegramtyvene - 1915
- Grevindens ære - 1919
- Københavnere - 1933
- Flight from the Millions - 1934
- Giftes-nej tak - 1936
- Inkognito - 1937
- Champagnegaloppen - 1938
- Komtessen på Stenholt - 1939
- Sørensen og Rasmussen - 1940
- Sommerglæder - 1940
- Søren Søndervold - 1942
- Forellen - 1942
- Jeg mødte en morder - 1943
- Det gælder os alle - 1949
- Mosekongen - 1950
- Fodboldpræsten - 1951
- Det store løb - 1952
- Kærlighedsdoktoren - 1952
- Far til fire - 1953
- Min søn Peter - 1953
- We Who Go the Kitchen Route - 1953
- Far til fire i sneen - 1954
- Far til fire i byen - 1956
- Far til fire og onkel Sofus - 1957
- Far til fire og ulveungerne - 1958
- Pige i søgelyset - 1959
- Far til fire på Bornholm - 1959
- Helle for Helene - 1959
- Far til fire med fuld musik - 1961
- Støvsugerbanden - 1963
- Sommer i Tyrol - 1964
- Kampen om Næsbygaard - 1964
- En ven i bolignøden - 1965
- Næsbygaards arving - 1965
