= Hr. Petit =

1948 film

- Directed by: Alice O'Fredericks
- Written by: Alice Guldbrandsen; Alice O'Fredericks
- Produced by: Henning Karmark
- Starring: Sigfred Johansen
- Cinematography: Rudolf Frederiksen
- Edited by: Marie Ejlersen
- Music by: Sven Gyldmark
- Release date: 20 September 1948
- Running time: 101 minutes
- Country: Denmark
- Language: Danish

Hr. Petit (Mr Petit) is a 1948 Danish crime film directed by Alice O'Fredericks.

== Cast ==
- Sigfred Johansen as Hr. Petit
- Grethe Holmer as Fru Petit
- Tavs Neiiendam as Naboen
- Randi Michelsen as Naboens kone
- Karin Nellemose as Marianne Boris
- Inge Hvid-Møller as Bertha Gautier
- Tove Bang as Isabelle
- Lisbeth Movin as Marguerite Palsler
- Betty Helsengreen as Henriette Palsler
- Betty Söderberg as Fru Picot
- Jon Branner as Franz Picot
- Lily Broberg as Stuepigen Lisson
- Jytte Møller as Fleure
- Jessie Rindom as Guvernanten
- William Jarlbak as Pateren
- Tove Grandjean as Fru de Brisville
- Karen Meyer as Hendes svigerinde
- Preben Lerdorff Rye as Detektiven
- Else Jarlbak as Søster Gabrielle
- Børge Møller Grimstrup
