= Teatertosset =

1944 film

- DVD cover
- Directed by: Alice O'Fredericks
- Written by: Paul Sarauw
- Produced by: Henning Karmark
- Starring: Marguerite Viby
- Cinematography: Rudolf Frederiksen
- Edited by: Marie Ejlersen
- Music by: Sven Gyldmark
- Release date: 28 February 1944
- Running time: 96 minutes
- Country: Denmark
- Language: Danish

Teatertosset is a 1944 Danish family film directed by Alice O'Fredericks. A separate Swedish version Dolly Takes a Chance, directed by Gustaf Edgren, was also made.

== Cast ==
- Marguerite Viby as Dorrit Madsen
- Hans Kurt as Knud Andersen
- Karl Gustav Ahlefeldt as Ole Vang
- Johannes Meyer as Hr. Fuglsang
- Else Jarlbak as Nanna Sten
- Sigrid Horne-Rasmussen as Gerda
- Preben Neergaard as Harald
- Erik Sjøgreen as Jens
- Helga Frier as Fru Vildemose
- Henry Nielsen as Regissør Lund
- Knud Heglund as Instruktør Iversen
- Else Colber as Vera
- Ib Schønberg as Teaterdirektør Brummer
