= Far til fire med fuld musik =

- Film poster
- Directed by: Alice O'Fredericks; Robert Saaskin (Assistant director)
- Written by: Jon Iversen; Alice O'Fredericks
- Produced by: Henning Karmark; Lau Lauritzen
- Starring: Karl Stegger
- Cinematography: Rudolf Frederiksen
- Edited by: Wera Iwanouw
- Music by: Sven Gyldmark
- Distributed by: ASA Film
- Release date: 15 December 1961
- Running time: 95 minutes
- Country: Denmark
- Language: Danish

Far til fire med fuld musik is a 1961 Danish family film directed by Alice O'Fredericks.

== Cast ==
- Karl Stegger as Far
- Peter Malberg as Onkel Anders
- Agnes Rehni as Fru Sejrsen
- Hanne Borchsenius as Søs
- Ib Mossin as Peter (and voice of Mister)
- Rudi Hansen as Mie
- Otto Møller Jensen as Ole
- Ole Neumann as Lille Per
- Einar Juhl as Rektor
- Kirsten Passer as Frk. Ludvigsen
- Jørgen Buckhøj as Betjent
- Gunnar Lemvigh as Opdageren
- Ove Rud as Købmanden
- Torsten Fønss as Leif
- Leo Bandrup Knudsen as Ulf
- Poul Finn Poulsen as Klaus
- Dorte Bjørndal as Nina
- Harald Nielsen as Mister (dubbed by Ib Mossin)
- Helmer Bonde as Jens
