= Bedstemor går amok =

1944 film

- Directed by: Lau Lauritzen Jr. Alice O'Fredericks
- Written by: Lau Lauritzen Jr. Alice O'Fredericks
- Produced by: Henning Karmark
- Starring: Petrine Sonne
- Cinematography: Rudolf Frederiksen
- Edited by: Marie Ejlersen
- Release date: 30 October 1944
- Running time: 68 minutes
- Country: Denmark
- Language: Danish

Bedstemor går amok is a 1944 Danish comedy film directed by Alice O'Fredericks.

== Cast ==
- Petrine Sonne as Grandmother Betty Larsen
- Christian Arhoff as Doctor Galde
- Helge Kjærulff-Schmidt as Adam Larsen
- Lily Broberg as Eva Voldoni
- Sigrid Horne-Rasmussen as Juliane
- Bjarne Forchhammer as Charles
- Knud Heglund as Cirkus director Voldoni
- Henry Nielsen as Hushovmester
- Helga Frier as Tante Emma
