= Knud Schrøder =

Danish actor (1903–1976)

- Born: 28 July 1903; Denmark
- Died: 15 December 1976 (aged 73); Denmark
- Occupation: Actor
- Years active: 1944–1965

Knud Schrøder (28 July 1903 – 15 December 1976) was a Danish film actor. He appeared in 23 films between 1944 and 1965. He was born and died in Denmark.

== Filmography ==
- Jensen længe leve (1965)
- En ven i bolignøden (1965)
- Kampen om Næsbygård (1964)
- Premiere i helvede (1964)
- Der brænder en ild (1962)
- Rikki og mændene (1962)
- Det skete på Møllegården (1960)
- Forelsket i København (1960)
- Helle for Helene (1959)
- Far til fire og ulveungerne (1958)
- Seksdagesløbet (1958)
- Tag til marked i Fjordby (1957)
- Der var engang en gade (1957)
- Ingen tid til kærtegn (1957)
- Far til fire i byen (1956)
- Den kloge mand (1956)
- Min datter Nelly (1955)
- Ved kongelunden... (1953)
- Det store løb (1952)
- Vejrhanen (1952)
- Café Paradis (1950)
- Den opvakte jomfru (1950)
- Elly Petersen (1944)
