= Bundfald =

- Directed by: Palle Kjærulff-Schmidt; Robert Saaskin
- Starring: Birgitte Bruun; Ib Mossin; Ghita Nørby
- Music by: Sven Gyldmark
- Release date: 23 August 1957
- Running time: 1h 26min
- Country: Denmark
- Language: Danish

Bundfald is a 1957 Danish crime drama film directed by Palle Kjærulff-Schmidt and Robert Saaskin.

== Cast ==
- Birgitte Bruun as Rosa Jensen
- Ib Mossin as Anton Hansen
- Ghita Nørby as Else
- Bent Christensen as Kaj Jensen
- Lone Hertz as Rita
- Preben Kaas as Egon
- Jakob Nielsen as 'Skipper'
- Christian Brochorst as "'Moster", bartender
- Jørn Jeppesen as car dealer
