= Panik i familien =

1945 film

- Directed by: Lau Lauritzen Jr. Alice O'Fredericks
- Written by: Preben Philipsen; Paul Sarauw; Victor Skaarup
- Produced by: Henning Karmark
- Starring: Ib Schønberg
- Cinematography: Rudolf Frederiksen
- Edited by: Marie Ejlersen
- Music by: Sven Gyldmark
- Distributed by: Nordisk Film (DVD)
- Release date: 6 August 1945
- Running time: 59 minutes
- Country: Denmark
- Language: Danish

Panik i familien is a 1945 Danish film directed by Lau Lauritzen Jr. and Alice O'Fredericks. Nordisk Film released the film on DVD in October 2016.

== Cast ==
- Ib Schønberg as Larsen
- Christian Arhoff as Hansen
- Lily Broberg as Fru Hansen
- Jessie Rindom as Fru Larsen
- Svend Bille
- Henry Nielsen
- Astrid Neumann
- Birthe Korsø
- Poul Guldager
- Bjørn Puggaard-Müller
