= Henry Lohmann =

Danish actor (1924–1967)

- Born: 14 February 1924; Blommenslyst, Denmark
- Died: 4 October 1967 (aged 43); Denmark
- Occupation: Actor
- Years active: 1954-1967

Henry Lohmann (14 February 1924 – 4 October 1967) was a Danish film actor. He appeared in 24 films between 1954 and 1967.

== Selected filmography ==
- The Poet and the Little Mother (1959)
- Forelsket i København (1960)
- The Heir to Næsbygaard (1965)
- Neighbours (1966)
- Brødrene på Uglegaarden (1967)
