= Else Jarlbak =

Danish actress (1911–1963)

- Born: 8 August 1911; Copenhagen, Denmark
- Died: 16 February 1963 (aged 51); Denmark
- Occupation: Actress
- Years active: 1934–1961

Else Jarlbak (8 August 1911 – 16 February 1963) was a Danish film actress. She appeared in 35 films between 1934 and 1961. She was born in Copenhagen, Denmark and died in Denmark.

== Filmography ==
- Lynet (1934)
- De bør forelske dem (1935)
- En fuldendt gentleman (1937)
- Inkognito (1937)
- Pas på Svinget i Solby (1940)
- Frøken Kirkemus (1941)
- Teatertosset (1944)
- Man elsker kun en gang (1945)
- Diskret Ophold (1946)
- The Swedenhielm Family (1947)
- Hr. Petit (1948)
- Tre år efter (1948)
- Vi vil ha' et barn (1949)
- Det hændte i København (1949)
- Din fortid er glemt (1949)
- De røde heste (1950)
- Susanne (1950)
- I gabestokken (1950)
- Vores fjerde far (1951)
- Dorte (1951)
- Avismanden (1952)
- Rekrut 67, Petersen (1952)
- Kærlighedsdoktoren (1952)
- Husmandstøsen (1952)
- Ta' Pelle med (1952)
- För min heta ungdoms skull (1952)
- Store løb, Det (1952)
- The Crime of Tove Andersen (1953)
- Far til fire (1953)
- Min datter Nelly (1955)
- Tante Tut fra Paris (1956)
- Der var engang en gade (1957)
- Skibet er ladet med (1960)
- Min kone fra Paris (1961)
- Sorte Shara (1961)
