= Birgitte Price =

Danish actress (1934–1997)

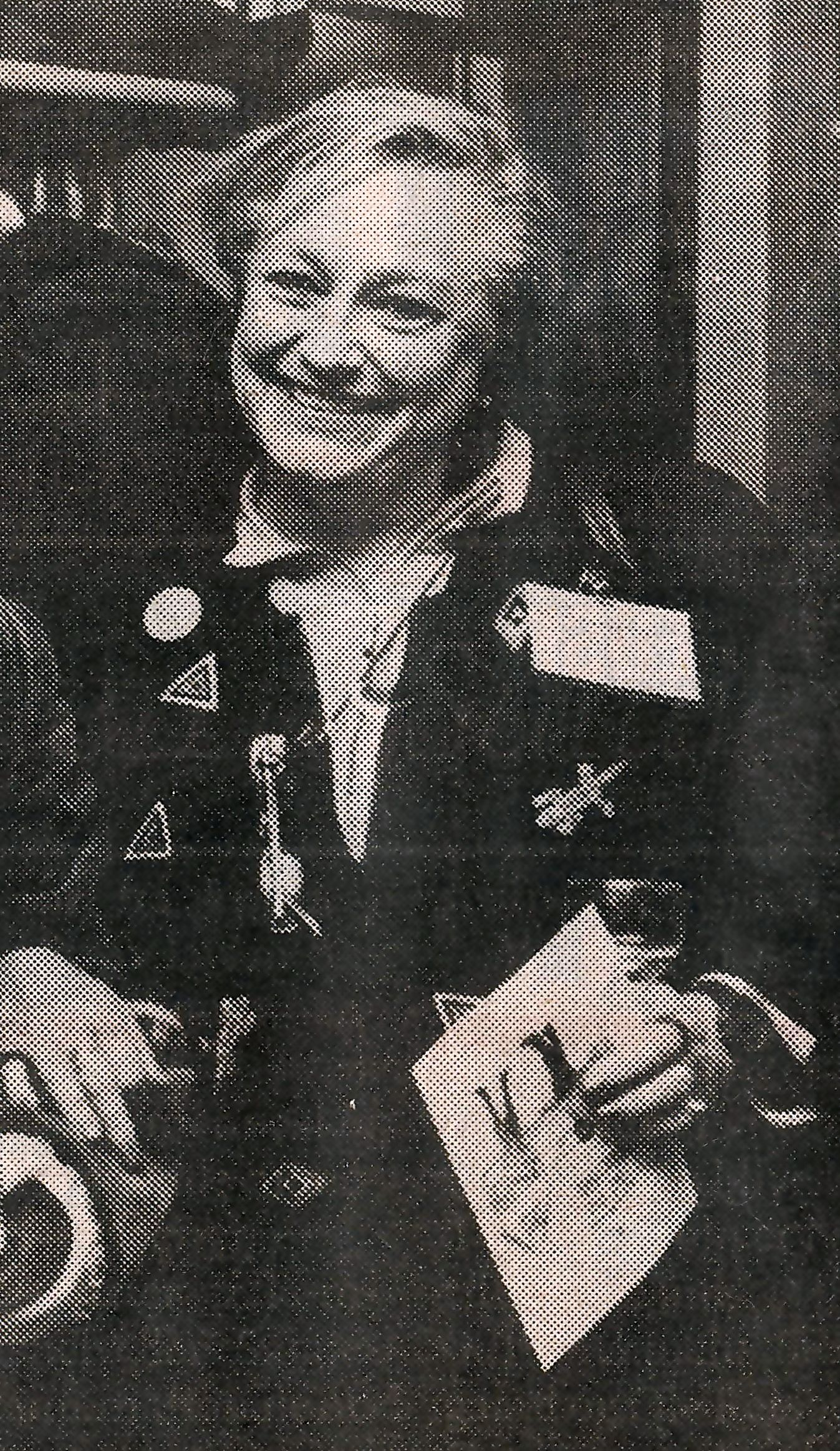
- Price in November 1992
- Born: Birgitte Bruun; 29 April 1934; Copenhagen, Denmark
- Died: 17 July 1997 (aged 63); Copenhagen, Denmark
- Years active: 1952- 1972

Birgitte Price (earlier known as Birgitte Bruun; 29 April 1934 – 17 July 1997) was a Danish actress of the 1950s and 1960s.

== Filmography ==
- Det store løb (1952)
- Far til fire (1953)
- Farlig Ungdom (1953)
- Father of Four in the Snow (1954)
- En sømand går i land (1954)
- Father of Four in the Country (1955)
- Taxa K 1640 efterlyses (1956)
- Father of Four in the City (1956)
- Father of Four and Uncle Sofus (1957)
- Bundfald (1957)
- Mariannes bryllup (1958)
- Father of Four and the Wolf Cubs (1958)
- Verdens rigeste pige (1958)
- Helle for Helene (1959)
- Don Olsen kommer til byen (1964)
- The Girl and the Millionaire (1965)
- Der var engang (1966)
- Kys til højre og venstre (1969)
- Stine og drengene (1969)
- Oh, to Be on the Bandwagon! (1972)
- Katinka (1988)
