= Otto Møller Jensen =

Danish actor (1940–1996)

- Born: 31 July 1940; Copenhagen, Denmark
- Died: 12 March 1996 (aged 55); Denmark

Otto Møller Jensen (31 July 1940 – 12 March 1996) was a Danish child actor. He was known for his appearances in the Far til fire series of films in the 1950s and early 1960s.

== Filmography ==
- Fløjtespilleren (1953)
- Arvingen (1954)
- Far til fire i byen (1956)
- Far til fire og ulveungerne (1958)
- Far til fire med fuld musik (1961)
- Far til fire på Bornholm (1959)
- Far til fire og onkel Sofus (1957)
- Far til fire på landet (1955)
- Far til fire i sneen (1954)
- Far til fire (1953)
