= Hans onsdagsveninde =

1943 film

- Directed by: Lau Lauritzen Jr. Alice O'Fredericks
- Written by: Paul Sarauw
- Produced by: Henning Karmark
- Starring: Peter Malberg
- Cinematography: Rudolf Frederiksen
- Edited by: Marie Ejlersen
- Music by: Sven Gyldmark
- Release date: 21 April 1943
- Running time: 99 minutes
- Country: Denmark
- Language: Danish

Hans onsdagsveninde is a 1943 Danish comedy film directed by Lau Lauritzen Jr. and Alice O'Fredericks.

It was based on the play Peter den store by Paul Sarauw, which premiered in 1930 at Det Ny Theater. The same play was also made into a Swedish film in 1946 under the title Onsdagsväninnan.

== Cast ==
- Peter Malberg as Balder Svanemose
- Karl Gustav Ahlefeldt as Peter Engel
- Maria Garland as Generalinden
- Bodil Kjer as Magda Hansen
- Johannes Meyer as Anton Hansen
- Ib Schønberg as Butleren
- Helge Kjærulff-Schmidt as Slagter Andersen
- Knud Heglund as Doktoren
- Svend Bille as Peter Engel's ven
- Eigil Reimers as Reingaard
- Petrine Sonne as Fru Larsen
- Ingeborg Pehrson as Kioskdame
- Henry Nielsen - Bartenderen
