= Karl Gustav Ahlefeldt =

Danish actor (1910–1985)

- Born: Karl Gustav Henry Folmer Ahlefeldt; 13 March 1910; Copenhagen, Denmark
- Died: 25 March 1985 (aged 75)
- Occupation: Actor
- Years active: 1935–1975

Karl Gustav Henry Folmer Ahlefeldt (13 March 1910 – 25 March 1985) was a Danish film actor. He appeared in the Carl Theodor Dreyer film Gertrud (1965).

== Filmography ==
Year	Title	Role	Notes
1935	De bør forelske Dem	Erik's colleague	
1940	Familien Olsen	Willy Alfred Olsen	
1940	Sommerglæder	Mr. Arthur	
1941	Tante Cramers testamente	Poul Cramer	
1942	Søren Søndervold	Poul Tegberg	
1943	Hans onsdagsveninde	Peter Engel	
1943	Som du vil ha' mig	Guest at the party	
1944	Teatertosset	Ole Vang	
1944	Elly Petersen	Leif Faber	
1946	Hans store aften	Actor Erik Bergmann	
1946	Op med lille Martha	Poul Svendsen	
1947	Når katten er ude	Carl Berg	
1948	Tre år efter	Attorney Gleser	
1950	I gabestokken	Reserve doctor	
1951	Nålen	Laborant	
1951	Alt dette og Island med	Saboteur	
1951	Frihed forpligter	Freedom fighter	
1957	Tag til marked i Fjordby	Male shoplifter	
1958	Mariannes bryllup	Pub guest who is thrown out	
1958	Det lille hotel	Lawyer Andersen	
1961	Gøngehøvdingen	Junker Kørbitz	
1964	Gertrud		
1970	Hurra for de blå husarer	Adams' father	
1975	Familien Gyldenkål		
1975	Bejleren – en jysk røverhistorie		(final film role)
