= Det gamle guld =

1951 film

- Film poster
- Directed by: Jon Iversen; Alice O'Fredericks
- Written by: Morten Korch; Alice O'Fredericks
- Produced by: Henning Karmark
- Starring: Poul Reichhardt
- Cinematography: Rudolf Frederiksen
- Edited by: Wera Iwanouw
- Music by: Sven Gyldmark
- Release date: 21 December 1951
- Running time: 99 minutes
- Country: Denmark
- Language: Danish

Det gamle guld is a 1951 Danish family film directed by Alice O'Fredericks.

== Cast ==
- Poul Reichhardt - Niels Sværke
- Tove Maës - Grethe Holm
- Maria Garland - Martha Sværke
- Per Buckhøj - Hans Sværke
- Ib Schønberg - Sognefoged Dines Mikkelsen
- Peter Malberg - Jens
- Erika Voigt - Jacobine
- Louis Miehe-Renard - Palle
- Birgitte Reimer - Klara Karius
- Sigurd Langberg - Propritær Karius
- Jørn Jeppesen - Hugo David
- Pia Ahnfelt-Rønne - Maria - pige på Dybegården
- Paul Holck-Hofmann - Bankdirektør
- Christen Møller - Arkæolog
- Agnes Phister-Andresen - Maren - nabokone
- Jørgen Henriksen - Niels som dreng
- Grethe Holmer
- Morten Korch - Himself
- Aksel Schiøtz - Singer (voice)
