= Henning Karmark =

Danish film producer (1907-1989)

- Born: 17 December 1907; Varde, Denmark
- Died: 11 January 1989 (aged 81); Nice, France
- Occupation: Film producer
- Years active: 1937–1971

Henning Karmark (17 December 1907 – 11 January 1989) was a Danish film producer. He produced 90 films between 1937 and 1971 and was one of the most active producers at the ASA Film studio. He was born in Varde, Denmark and died in Nice, France.

== Filmography ==
- Med kærlig hilsen (1971)
- Mig og min lillebror og Bølle (1969)
- Mig og min lillebror og storsmuglerne (1968)
- Brødrene på Uglegaarden (1967)
- Krybskytterne på Næsbygård (1966)
- Utro (1966)
- Tre små piger (1966)
- Næsbygårds arving (1965)
- Landmandsliv (1965)
- Kampen om Næsbygård (1964)
- Syd for Tana River (1963)
- Der brænder en ild (1962)
- Svinedrengen og prinsessen på ærten (1962)
- Far til fire med fuld musik (1961)
- Min kone fra Paris (1961)
- Skete på Møllegården, Det (1960)
- Far til fire på Bornholm (1959)
- Vi er allesammen tossede (1959)
- Kærlighedens melodi (1959)
- Vagabonderne på Bakkegården (1958)
- Far til fire og ulveungerne (1958)
- Far til fire og onkel Sofus (1957)
- Sønnen fra Amerika (1957)
- Natlogi betalt (1957)
- Flintesønnerne (1956)
- Far til fire i byen (1956)
- Kloge mand, Den (1956)
- Taxa K 1640 efterlyses (1956)
- Far til fire på landet (1955)
- Tre finder en kro (1955)
- Min datter Nelly (1955)
- Jorden rundt paa 80 minutter (1955)
- Arvingen (1954)
- Far til fire i sneen (1954)
- Fløjtespilleren (1953)
- Far til fire (1953)
- Solstik (1953)
- Det store løb (1952)
- Husmandstøsen (1952)
- Vejrhanen (1952)
- Det gamle guld (1951)
- Fodboldpræsten (1951)
- Mosekongen (1950)
- Den opvakte jomfru (1950)
- De røde heste (1950)
- Vi vil ha' et barn (1949)
- Hr. Petit (1948)
- Mani (1947)
- Når katten er ude (1947)
- The Swedenhielm Family (1947)
- Jeg elsker en anden (1946)
- Så mødes vi hos Tove (1946)
- Hans store aften (1946)
- De røde enge (1945)
- De kloge og vi gale (1945)
- Panik i familien (1945)
- Affæren Birte (1945)
- Mit liv er musik (1944)
- Bedstemor går amok (1944)
- Frihed, lighed og Louise (1944)
- Elly Petersen (1944)
- Teatertosset (1944)
- Jeg mødte en morder (1943)
- Ender med bryllup, Det (1943)
- En pige uden lige (1943)
- Hans Onsdagsveninde (1943)
- Det Brændende spørgsmål (1943)
- Op med humøret (1943)
- Lykken kommer (1942)
- Tyrannens Fald (1942)
- Frk. Vildkat (1942)
- Søren Søndervold (1942)
- Afsporet (1942)
- Frøken Kirkemus (1941)
- Tag til Rønneby Kro (1941)
- Far skal giftes (1941)
- Tror du jeg er født i Gaar! (1941)
- Niels Pind og hans dreng (1941)
- Desertør, En (1940)
- Pas på Svinget i Solby (1940)
- Familien Olsen (1940)
- I dag begynder livet (1939)
- The People of Högbogården (1939)
- Nordhavets mænd (1939)
- Genboerne (1939)
- De tre måske fire (1939)
- Alarm (1938)
- Den kloge Mand (1937)
- Frk. Møllers jubilæum (1937)
- En fuldendt gentleman (1937)
