= Petrine Sonne =

Danish actress

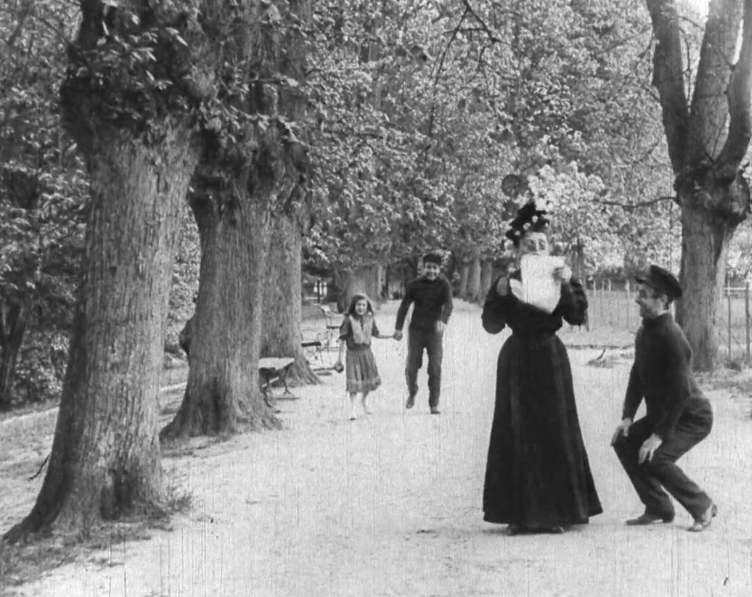
- Petrine Sonne (second from right) in Den nærsynede Guvernante (1909)
- Born: Johanne Petrine Møller; 25 November 1870; Copenhagen, Denmark
- Died: 26 May 1946 (aged 75)

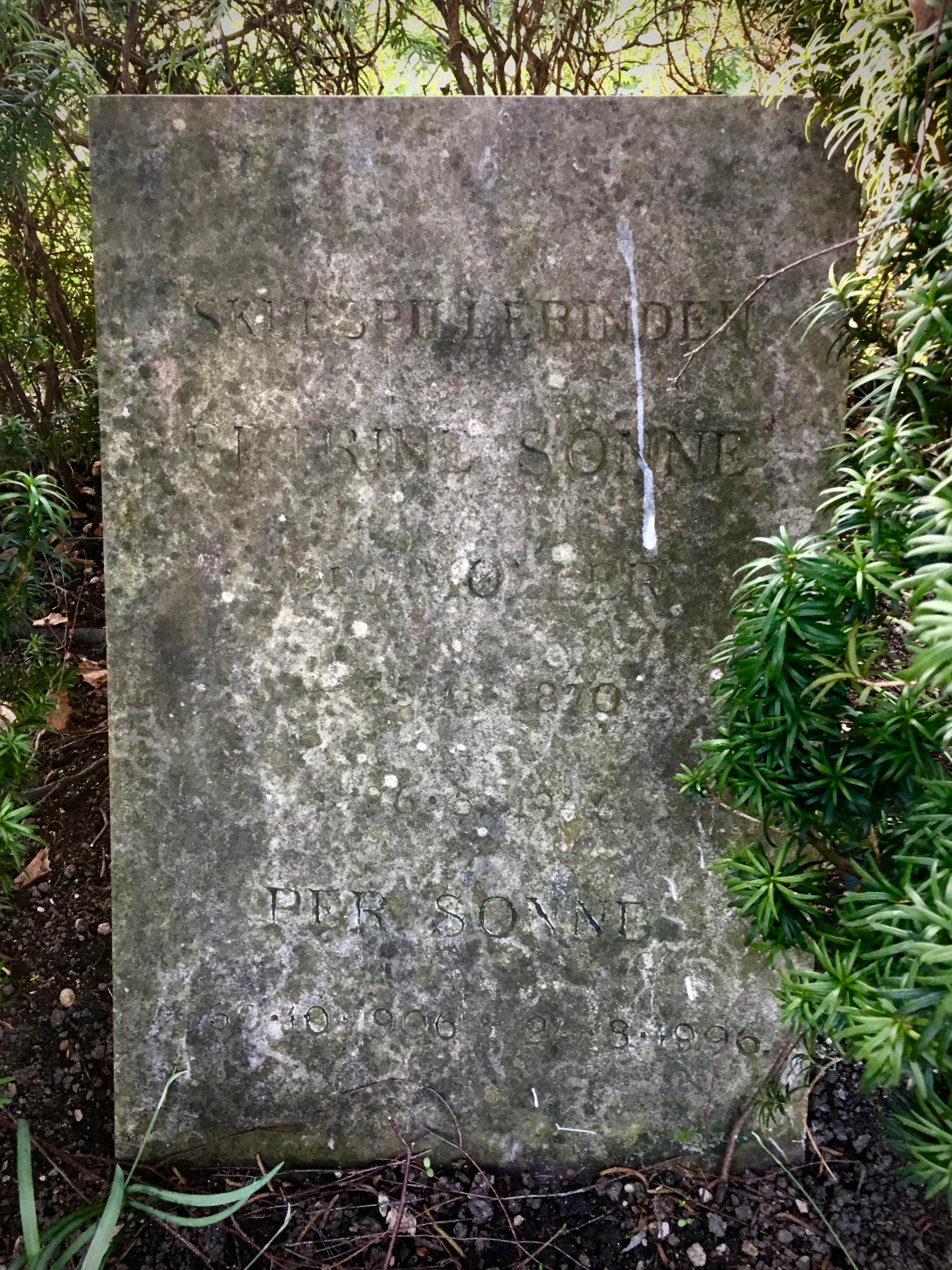
Actress Petrine Sonne and her son Per Sonne's tombstone, Assistens Cemetery.

Petrine Sonne (25 November 1870 – 26 May 1946) was a Danish stage and film actress.

Born Johanne Petrine Møller in Copenhagen, she was the sister of actor and cartoonist Valdemar Møller.

== Filmography ==
- Du skal ære din hustru, 1925
- Barken Margrethe af Danmark, 1934
- København, Kalundborg og, ?, 1934
- Prisoner Number One, 1935
- The Golden Smile (1935)
- Millionærdrengen, 1936
- Bolettes brudefærd, 1938
- Alle går rundt og forelsker sig, 1941
- Thummelumsen, 1941
- En mand af betydning, 1941
- Tag til Rønneby kro, 1941
- Tobiasnætter, 1941
- Tror du jeg er født i går?, 1941
- En herre i kjole og hvidt, 1942
- Et skud før midnat, 1942
- Hans onsdagsveninde, 1943
- Bedstemor går amok, 1944
- Biskoppen, 1944
- Det kære København, 1944
- Mordets melodi, 1944
- Otte akkorder, 1944
- Spurve under taget, 1944
- To som elsker hinanden, 1944
- Man elsker kun een gang, 1945
- Billet mrk., 1946
