= Karen Berg (actress) =

Danish actress (1906–1995)

- Born: 28 May 1906; Copenhagen, Denmark
- Died: 15 November 1995 (aged 89); Charlottenlund, Denmark
- Occupation: Actress
- Years active: 1940–1983
- Spouse: Svend Jørgensen

Karen Else Caroline Berg (28 May 1906 in Copenhagen – 15 November 1995 in Charlottenlund) was a Danish actress.

== Theatrical career ==
She first attended ballet school, then the theatrical school of the Royal Danish Theater. She debuted there in 1927 and remained until 1978. Later in her career she became known for character parts in plays like Sparekassen, performed in 1963, The Fidget in 1967, and The Political Tinker in 1972.

== Selected TV-series ==
- Huset på Christianshavn (1970–1977) - Mrs. Dagmar Hammerstedt
- Matador (1978–1982) - Mrs. Fernando Møhge

== Selected filmography ==
She appeared in more than twenty Danish feature films. Some of them are:

- Sommer Glæder (1940) - Mrs. Rasmussen
- Lucky Journey (1947) - Rasmussen
- Historien om Hjortholm (1950) - Wife of the old count
- Det var paa Rundetaarn (1955) - Mrs. Hald
- Baronessen fra benzintanken (The Baroness from the Gas Station) (1960) - Astrid von Pleum, governess
- Dronningens vagtmester (1963) - Mette Gyde
- Kampen om Næsbygård (1964) - Helene
- The Heir to Næsbygaard (1965) - Helene
- Krybskytterne på Næsbygård (1966) - Helene
- Magic in Town (1968) - Auntie Alma

== Awards and honours ==
She was honoured as a Knight of the Dannebrog, 1st Class.

She is mentioned in Kraks Blå Bog (Krak's Blue Book).
