= Min datter Nelly =

1955 film

- Directed by: Alice O'Fredericks
- Written by: Leck Fischer; Grete Frische
- Produced by: Henning Karmark
- Starring: Maria Garland
- Cinematography: Rudolf Frederiksen
- Edited by: Wera Iwanouw
- Release date: 29 August 1955
- Running time: 99 minutes
- Country: Denmark
- Language: Danish

Min datter Nelly is a 1955 Danish family film directed by Alice O'Fredericks.

== Cast ==
- Maria Garland - Fru Ingeborg Olsen
- Poul Reichhardt - Dyrlæge Kaare
- Lillian Tillegren - Nelly
- Randi Michelsen - Tante Jessie
- Erni Arneson - Kitty
- Bendt Rothe - Tandlæge Bent Holm
- Else Jarlbak - Kitty's veninde
- Knud Schrøder - Kitty's ven
- Bodil Steen - Lotte Jørgensen
- Karl Stegger - Slagteren
