= The Richest Girl in the World (1958 film) =

1958 film

- Film poster
- Directed by: Lau Lauritzen Jr. Alice O'Fredericks
- Written by: Børge Müller
- Based on: Verdens rigeste pige Danish play by Walter Ellis
- Starring: Poul Reichhardt
- Cinematography: Rudolf Frederiksen
- Edited by: Wera Iwanouw
- Music by: Sven Gyldmark
- Release date: 31 July 1958
- Running time: 110 minutes
- Country: Denmark
- Language: Danish

The Richest Girl in the World (Danish: Verdens rigeste pige) is a 1958 Danish comedy film directed by Lau Lauritzen Jr. and Alice O'Fredericks. It marked the film debut of the already popular singing duo Nina & Frederik, with Nina as the title character, and Frederik as the handsome but poor calypso singer she falls in love with.

== Cast ==
- Poul Reichhardt as John
- Nina Van Pallandt as Lisa Hoffman
- Frederik van Pallandt as Jacques
- Birgitte Bruun as Judy
- Gunnar Lauring as Onkel Toby
- Jessie Rindom as Clara
- Jeanne Darville as Elisabeth
- Asbjørn Andersen as Hoffmann
- Else-Marie as Frk. Bartholin
- Paul Hagen as Journalist Lund
- Johannes Marott as Pressefotograf Smith
- Christa Rasmusen as Johns sekretær
- Christa Rasmussen as Johns sekretær
- Judy Gringer as Omstillingsdame
