= Alice O'Fredericks =

Danish actress and film director (1899–1968)

- Born: Mitzi Otha Alice Frederiksen; 8 September 1899; Gothenburg, Sweden
- Died: 18 February 1968 (aged 68); Hellerup, Denmark
- Occupation(s): Actress, Director, Writer
- Years active: 1921–1963
- Spouse: Oskar Klintholm (m. 1927; died 1959)

Alice O'Fredericks (born Mitzi Otha Alice Frederiksen; 8 September 1899 – 18 February 1968) was a Danish actress, screenwriter, and film director. O'Fredericks was the first female director of sound films in Denmark. Having written 38 produced screenplays and directed 72 feature films, O'Fredericks was one of the most prolific directors in Danish cinema. O'Fredericks also directed the first Danish films which highlighted women's rights. She is best known for directing the series of Far til Fire (Father of Four) comedies and the series of family dramas based on Morten Korch novels. The Alice Award, presented annually to the Best Female Director at the Copenhagen International Film Festival, is named in her honor.

== Early life ==
Alice O'Fredericks was born Mitzi Otha Alice Frederiksen on 8 September 1899 in Gothenburg, Sweden, the daughter of telegraph operator Otto Ditlev Frederiksen and Marie Jensine Elvstrøm. Her parents divorced when she was a young girl, after which she moved with her mother to Copenhagen. She was educated at a secretarial school then landed a job in 1918 as a script girl for Danish director, Benjamin Christensen. At this time she adopted the stage name of Alice O'Fredericks.

== Career ==
=== Acting career ===
In 1920, O'Fredericks stepped in front of the camera, making her film debut as a nun in Christensen's controversial silent film Häxan (The Witches). Through the 1920s, she performed in several films including Gudmundur Kamban's drama Hadda Padda, and the comedy Pas Paa Pigerne for the popular Danish duo of Ole & Axel (Carl Schenstrøm and Harold Madsen). She created the Tumling Film production company with actor Johannes Meyer, played the starring role in two movies for Nordisk Film, and finished her acting career in George Schnéevoigt's 1929 Norwegian production of Laila.

=== Screenwriting and direction career ===
O'Fredericks debuted as a screenwriter in 1928 after winning a contest sponsored by the B.T. newspaper. Her manuscript became the Ole & Axel film Filmens Helte (The Heroes of the Movies). Thereafter she was employed with Palladium Film as a screenwriter and became a director's assistant to Lau Lauritzen Sr. Through Lauritzen's mentoring, O'Fredericks learned the craft of filmmaking which laid the groundwork for her long and successful career as a director.

She began directing films in 1934 in partnership with Lauritzen's son, Lau Lauritzen Jr. Their first effort was the farce Ud i den kolde sne (Out in the Cold Snow). The O'Fredericks-Lauritzen partnership flourished and they made 27 films together during the 1930s and 1940s. In 1950, she took a solo turn in the director's chair at ASA Film with the filmatization of the Morten Korch novel De røde heste (The Red Horse). Korch's novels about rural life were very popular in Denmark but until then had never been transferred to the screen. The Red Horses was a huge success, and with 2.3 million viewers, became the most watched film in Danish history. O'Fredericks went on to film six more Korch novels.

She also made several films in partnership with Jon Iversen and Robert Saaskin. During the same period, O'Fredericks created her popular series of Far til Fire (Father to Four) family comedies. Between 1953 and 1961, she wrote and directed eight of them. During her later years O'Fredericks suffered from rheumatism that confined her to a wheelchair. Nonetheless, she continued to write and direct, and she often employed two men to carry her around the set.

In the mid-1960s she wrote and directed a series of three rural dramas, the Næsbygaard films. These became her final films. O'Fredericks died of rheumatism on 18 February 1968 in Hellerup, Denmark. With a total of 72 films directed and 38 produced screenplays, O'Fredericks is one of Denmark's most productive filmmakers ever. Although film critics of her day gave her folk comedies only faint praise, her films were some of the most popular in Danish cinema.

O'Fredericks is noted as a pioneer for women filmmakers. She wrote and directed some of the first Danish films which focused on women and women's rights. These include her 1946 drama Så mødes vi hos Tove (We Meet at Tove's) about eight women who meet ten years after their graduation to discuss their lives; and 1943's Det Brændende spørgsmål (The Burning Question) about abortion and its consequences. In 2003, the Copenhagen International Film Festival created the Alice Award, named in her honor, to be given annually to the Best Female Director.

== Personal life ==
O'Fredericks was married to Danish businessman and wholesaler Oskar Klintholm from 1927 until his death in 1959.

== Filmography ==
=== Director ===
- Brødrene på Uglegaarden (1967)
- Krybskytterne på Næsbygård (1966)
- Næsbygårds arving (1965) ... a.k.a. The Heir to Næsbygaard
- Kampen om Næsbygård (1964)
- Sikke'n familie (1963)
- Der brænder en ild (1962)
- Far til fire med fuld musik (1961)
- Det skete på Møllegården (1960)
- Far til fire på Bornholm (1959)
- Vagabonderne på Bakkegården (1958)
- Far til fire og ulveungerne (1958)
- Verdens rigeste pige (1958) ... a.k.a. The Richest Girl in the World
- Far til fire og onkel Sofus (1957)
- Flintesønnerne (1956)
- Far til fire i byen (1956)
- Far til fire på landet (1955)
- Min datter Nelly (1955)
- Arvingen (1954)
- Far til fire i sneen (1954)
- Fløjtespilleren (1953)
- Far til fire (1953)
- Det Store løb (1952)
- Husmandstøsen (1952)
- Det Gamle guld (1951)
- Frihed forpligter (1951)
- Fodboldpræsten (1951)
- Mosekongen (1950)
- I gabestokken (1950)
- Den Opvakte jomfru (1950)
- De røde heste (1950) .. a.k.a. The Red Horses
- Vi vil ha' et barn (1949) ... a.k.a. We Want a Child!
- Det Gælder os alle (1949) ... a.k.a. It Concerns Us All
- Hr. Petit (1948)
- Stjerneskud (1947)
- Lise kommer til Byen (1947)
- Når katten er ude (1947)
- Jeg elsker en anden (1946) .. a.k.a. I Love Another
- Så mødes vi hos Tove (1946) ... a.k.a. We Meet at Tove's
- Onsdagsväninnan(1946)
- De kloge og vi gale (1945)
- Klingende toner (1945)
- Panik i familien (1945)
- Affæren Birte (1945)
- Bedstemor går amok (1944)
- Elly Petersen (1944)
- Teatertosset (1944)
- Hans Onsdagsveninde (1943)
- Det Brændende spørgsmål (1943) ... a.k.a. The Burning Question
- Tyrannens Fald (1942)
- Frk. Vildkat (1942)
- Frøken Kirkemus(1941)
- Tag til Rønneby Kro (1941)
- Tror du jeg er født i Gaar! (1941)
- En ganske almindelig pige (1940)
- Pas på Svinget i Solby (1940)
- Västkustens hjältar (1940)
- Familien Olsen (1940)
- I dag begynder livet (1939)
- De tre måske fire (1939)
- Blaavand melder Storm (1938)
- Livet paa Hegnsgaard (1938) ... a.k.a. Life on the Hegn Farm
- Julia jubilerar (1938)
- Alarm (1938)
- Der var engang en Vicevært (1937)
- Frk. Møllers jubilæum (1937)
- En Fuldendt gentleman (1937)
- Cirkusrevyen 1936 (1936)
- Panserbasse (1936)
- Snushanerne (1936)
- Week-end (1935)
- Kidnapped (1935)
- Ud i den kolde sne (1934)
- Hotel Paradis (1931)

=== Writer ===
- Brødrene på Uglegaarden (1967) ... a.k.a. The Owlfarm Brothers
- Krybskytterne på Næsbygård (1966)
- Næsbygårds arving (1965) ... a.k.a. The Heir to Næsby Farm
- Kampen om Næsbygård (1964)
- Sikke'n familie (1963)
- Der brænder en ild (1962)
- Far til fire med fuld musik (1961)
- Det skete på Møllegården (1960)
- Far til fire på Bornholm (1959)
- Vagabonderne på Bakkegården (1958)
- Far til fire og ulveungerne (1958)
- Far til fire og onkel Sofus (1957)
- Det Gamle guld (1951)
- Hr. Petit (1948)
- Klingende toner (1945)
- Bedstemor går amok (1944)
- Tror du jeg er født i Gaar! (1941)
- Västkustens hjältar (1940)
- De tre måske fire'' (1939)
- Blaavand melder Storm (1938)
- Julia jubilerar (1938)
- Alarm (1938)
- Der var engang en Vicevært (1937)
- Frk. Møllers jubilæum (1937)
- Panserbasse (1936)
- Snushanerne (1936)
- Week-end (1935)
- Kidnapped (1935)
- Barken Margrethe (1934)
- Ud i den kolde sne (1934)
- Københavnere (1933)
- Med fuld musik (1933)
- Han, hun og Hamlet (1932)
- I kantonnement (1932)
- Krudt med knald (1931)
- Pas paa pigerne (1930)
- Filmens helte (1928)
- Kraft og skønhed (1928)

=== Actress ===
- Laila (1929) .... Inger
- Flickorna på Solvik (1926) .... Young Girl
- Det Store hjerte (1925)
- Solskinsdalen (1925) .... Kari
- Hadda Padda (1924) .... Kristrun
- Smil og Tåre (1923) .... Bess
- Blandt byens børn (1923) ... a.k.a. The Lodgers of the seventh heaven
- Häxan (1922) .... Nun ... a.k.a. Witchcraft Through the Ages or The Witches
- Han, hun og Hamlet (1922)
- Film, flirt og forlovelse (1921)
