= Ib Mossin =

Danish actor, singer and director (1933–2004)

- Ib Mossin as Peter in the 1955 film Far til fire på landet
- Born: 3 July 1933; Frederiksberg, Denmark
- Died: 17 December 2004 (aged 71)

Ib Mossin (3 July 1933 – 17 December 2004) was a Danish actor, singer and director best known for his role as heartthrob Peter of the hugely popular Far til Fire film series. He had his breakthrough as the apprentice Egon in 1953's Farlig Ungdom (Dangerous Youth), a stark drama about the crime scene in Copenhagen among adolescents. He also had roles in fourteen of the eighteen Danish films based on novels by Morten Korch. Later in his life he travelled his home country talking about his experiences as an actor and celebrity. In 1999 he published his memoirs "Filmhelt til Tiden" (Moviehero on Time).

== Biography ==
Ib Mossin was born in Frederiksberg. He was son of Erik Otto Mossin, the proprietor of a larger company in Copenhagen. He spent his early years with his mother and stepfather living in Vangså in Thy. He got a job on a fishing boat in Thyborøn and later on another boat. When his stepfather died in 1951 he moved to Copenhagen where he studied acting under Danish actor Ejnar Juhl. After this brief period he got a job on a third ship where he worked for some time. Then his film career started. At that point he was still largely unknown in the Danish film scene but he still managed to get chosen for a role in the film Farlig Ungdom (1953) which would become a classic of its time. As he went on to even bigger roles, especially as Peter in all eight original Far til Fire films, he became one of the most beloved big screen actors of his time in the Danish film scene.

At the peak of his career he received 150 fan letters each day, which was considered a great accomplishment in Denmark at the time. He immortalized several songs he sang in films, among those the well known “Bornholm, Bornholm, Bornholm,” “Du er min Øjesten” (duet with Peter Malberg), and “Spil en Polka, Spillemand.” As one of the most established and popular actors in Denmark, he started directing films together with Alice O’Fredericks in 1964 and later directed the fisherman's drama Stormvarsel (1968) on his own. It turned out to be a box-office failure, alas same fate as most of the films he would later direct. It was also the first of three films he directed starring actress and wife Anne-Marie Juhl. From 1961 to 1968 he owned the fishing boat EMI. Even though he usually played one of the good guys in his starring films, he took part in the Danish hit series Matador about Denmark during World War II in the role as a Nazi, proving his versatility as an actor. He spent his last years as a lecturer, travelling Denmark. He published his memoirs Filmhelt til Tiden five years before his death. He is remembered mostly for his parts in the Far til Fire film series and in the Morten Korch films.

== Filmography ==
=== As actor ===
- Farlig ungdom (1953)
- Fløjtespilleren (1953)
- Far til fire (1953)
- Far til fire i sneen (1954)
- Far til fire på landet (1955)
- Far til fire i byen (1956)
- Flintesønnerne (1956)
- Bundfald (1957)
- Far til fire og onkel Sofus (1957)
- Vagabonderne på Bakkegården (1958)
- Far til fire og ulveungerne (1958)
- Far til fire på Bornholm (1959)
- Det skete på Møllegården (1960)
- Sømand i knibe (1960)
- Jetpiloter (1961)
- Far til fire med fuld musik (1961)
- Der brænder en ild (1962)
- Sikken familie (1963)
- Kampen om Næsbygård (1964)
- Næsbygårds arving (1965)
- I krydsild (1965, TV play)
- Krybskytterne på Næsbygård (1966)
- Brødrene på Uglegården (1967)
- Uden en trævl (1968)
- Det var en lørdag aften (1968)
- Tykke Olsen (1971, TV play)
- Every Afternoon (1972)
- Det gode og det onde (1975)
- Sønnen fra Vingården (1975)
- I løvens tegn (1976)
- Den dobbelte mand (1976)
- En Ægtemand (1976, TV play)
- Familien Gyldenkål vinder valget (1977)
- I skorpionens tegn—Agent 69 Jensen (1977)
- En by i Provinsen (1977–1980, TV series)
- I skyttens tegn (1978)
- Matador (1978–1982, TV series)
- Johnny Larsen (1979)
- Nedrykning (1979, TV play)
- Det parallelle lig (1982)
- Forræderne (1983)
- Ved stillebækken (1999, TV series)

=== As director ===
- Kampen om Næsbygård (1964)
- Krybskytterne på Næsbygård (1966)
- Brødrene på Uglegaarden (1967)
- Stormvarsel (1968)
- Far til fire i højt humør (1971)
- Manden på Svanegården (1972)
- Fætrene på Torndal (1973)
- Sønnen fra vingården (1975)
- Brand-Børge rykker ud (1976)
