= Peter Malberg =

Danish actor (1887–1965)

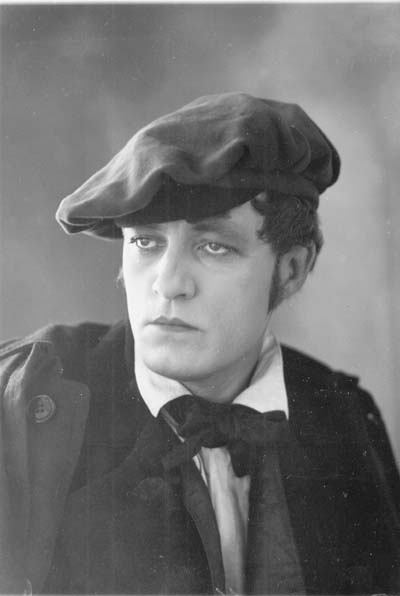
- in the 1922 film Hans Gode Genius
- Born: 21 September 1887; Aarhus, Denmark
- Died: 23 June 1965 (aged 77); Glostrup, Denmark
- Occupation: actor
- Years active: 1910–1966
- Known for: his role as Onkel Anders in the Far Til Fire movies
- Spouse: Ellen Nimb-Olsen (m. 1925)
- Relatives: Henrik Malberg (brother, actor)
- Awards: French Academy's Mark of Honor, Portuguese Red Cross

Peter Malberg (21 September 1887 – 23 June 1965) was a Danish actor best known for his role as Onkel Anders in the Far Til Fire movies. Peter was originally educated as a painter, but his job at Aarhus Theatre as a scenic painter along with the fact that his older brother Henrik was an actor, eventually led to him being in theater- and later film industry.

== Biography ==
Peter Malberg was born in Aarhus, Denmark. He was 15 years younger than his brother, the actor Henrik Malberg, who cared for Peter throughout his life. Their father was a haulage contractor, while their mother was of fragile health and was ill during long periods of Malberg's childhood. In 1904, when Malberg was 14 years old, his parents agreed that he was to be a painter's apprentice with master C. Christian Nielsen. Peter had talent as a painter and desired a formal education at the Academy of Fine Arts in Copenhagen. However, after serving his two-year apprenticeship, he was hired at Aarhus Theatre as a scenic painter. When Malberg saw how skillful his older brother was as an actor, he too wanted to try acting.

Malberg debuted on 22 March 1907 at the Aarhus Theatre as the Jailer in Ranke viljer (Unyielding Wills). He toured with an acting company in Norway, Sweden and Finland. In 1913, Malberg began working in the Copenhagen theaters, including the Alexandra Theatre, Frederiksberg Theatre and Betty Nansen Theatre. Malberg worked as a freelance actor, often in revues and comedic roles. In 1916 he took part in the Danmarks Eventyr (Denmark's Adventure) revue. Malberg achieved his greatest success on stage in the role of Balder Svanemose in the 1930 comedy Peter den Store (Peter the Great). It was a role he was eventually play more than a thousand times.

From 1910 to 1903, Malberg played roles in 22 silent movies, including David Copperfield (1922), Morænen and Laila. Malberg's most memorable movie role was the character of Uncle Axel which he played in eight Far til fire comedies. He also appeared in nine Morten Korch movies. In the movie Det gamle guld (The old gold), Malberg and Poul Reichhardt combined to sing popular Danish songs like "Jeg har min hest, jeg har min lasso" (I have my horse, I have my lasso) and "Du er min øjesten" (You are the apple of my eye).

In 1925 Peter married the actress Ellen Nimb-Olsen who was 16 years younger.

Malberg was awarded the French Academy's Mark of Honor and the Portuguese Red Cross' Cross of Honor.

== Filmography ==
=== Films ===
- Lynet (1934)
- Millionærdrengen (1936)
- Det begyndte ombord (1937)
- Bolettes Brudefærd (1938)
- Sørensen og Rasmussen (1940)
- Gå med mig hjem (1941)
- Thummelumsen (1941)
- En søndag på Amager (1941)
- Alle går rundt og forelsker sig (1941)
- Evn pige uden lige (1943)
- Hans onsdagsveninde (1943)
- Otte akkorder (1944)
- Lykke på rejsen (1947)
- Penge som græs (1948)
- I gabestokken (1950)
- Mosekongen (1950)
- Historien om Hjortholm (1950)
- De røde heste - 1950 (1950)
- Det gamle guld (1951)
- Fodboldpræsten (1951)
- Det store løb (1952)
- Far til fire (1953)
- Fløjtespilleren (1953)
- Far til fire i sneen (1954)
- Tre finder en kro (1955)
- Far til fire på landet (1955)
- Far til fire i byen (1956)
- Flintesønnerne (1956)
- Ingen tid til kærtegn (1957)
- Far til fire og onkel Sofus (1957)
- Mig og min familie (1957)
- Sønnen fra Amerika (1957)
- Der var engang en gade (1957)
- Far til fire og ulveungerne (1958)
- Far til fire på Bornholm (1959)
- Tro, håb og Trolddom (1960)
- Far til fire med fuld musik (1961)
- Der brænder en ild (1962)
- Den rige enke (1962)
- Sommer i Tyrol (1964)
- Kampen om Næsbygård (1964)
- Halløj i himmelsengen (1965)
- Ih, du forbarmende (1966)

=== Silent films ===
- Valdemar Sejr (1910)
- Ansigtstyven (1910)
- Elverhøj I (1910)
- Dollarprinsessen (1912)
- Lille Claus og store Claus (1913)
- Vingeskudt (1913)
- Det store Derbyløb (1913)
- Laila (1929) Lejla (1913)
- Søstrene Corrodi (1913)
- Den lurende død (1913)
- Den gådefulde dobbeltgænger (1913)
- Et syndens barn (1913)
- Adrianopels hemmelighed (1913)
- Den dovne dreng (1914)
- Fyrtårnets hemmelighed (1914)
- Borgkælderens mysterium (1914)
