= ASA Filmudlejning =

Danish film studio

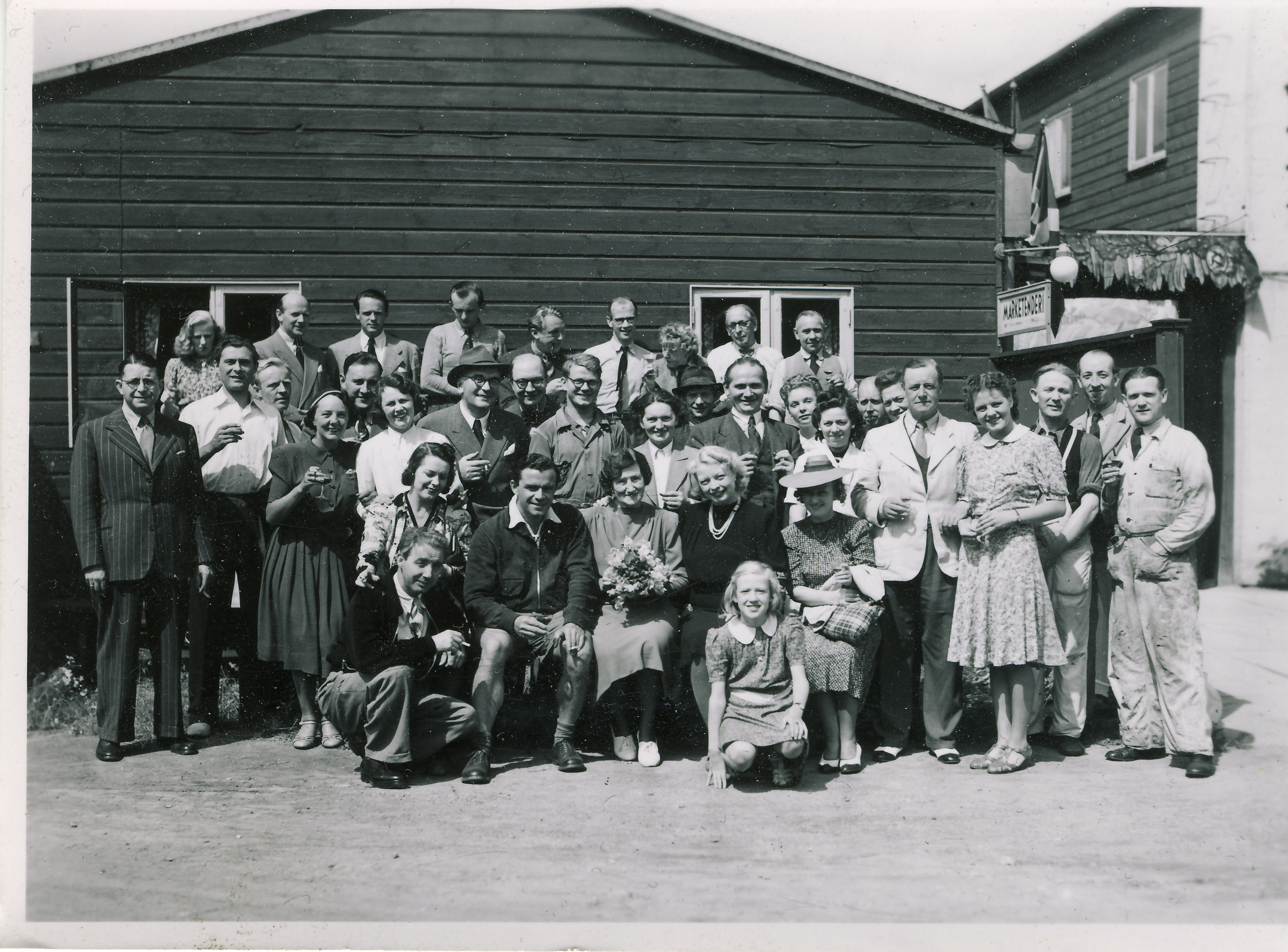
The cast and crew of ASA in 1950

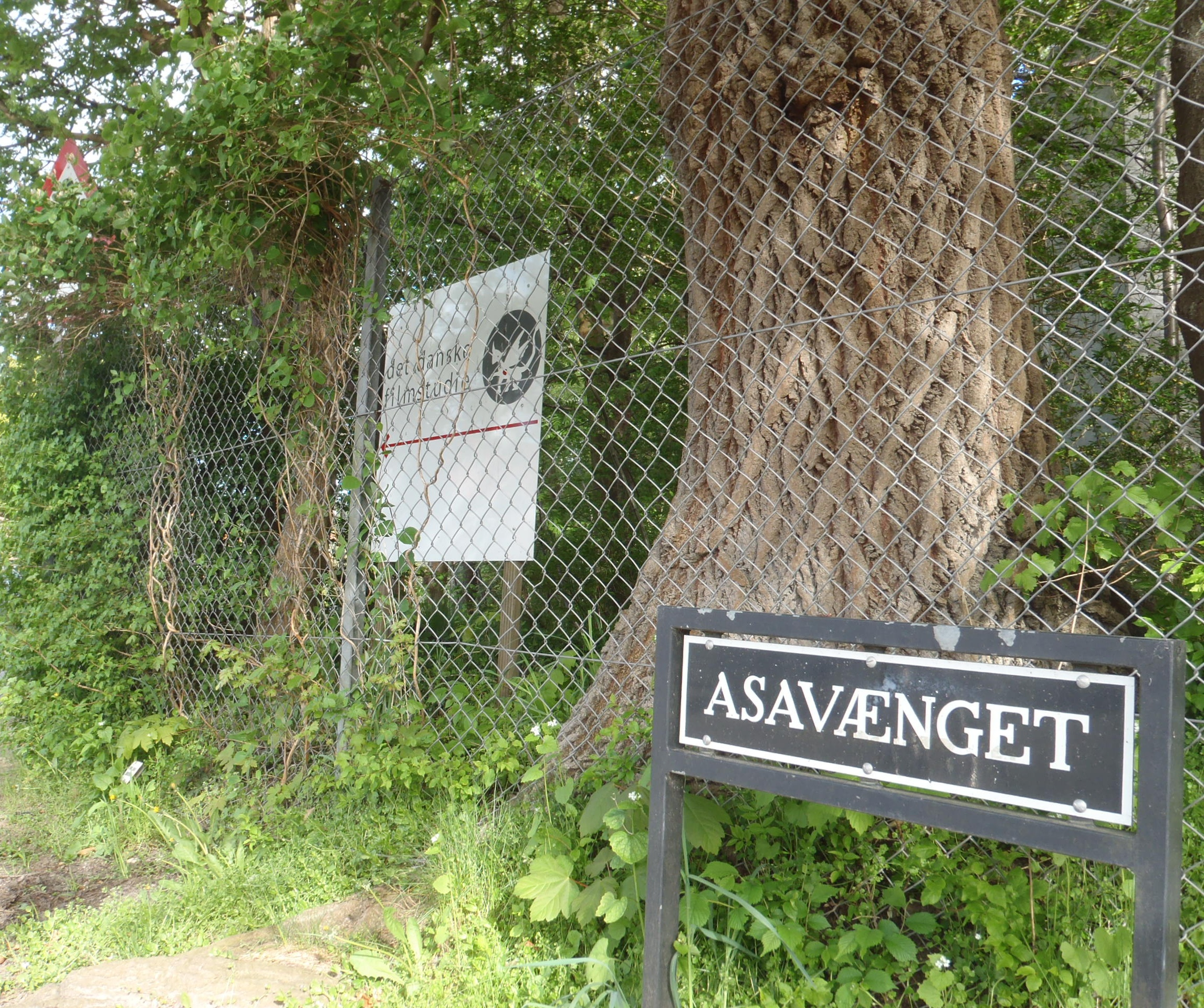
The street "Asavænget" where the studio is currently located is named after the company. The arrow on the sign at the fence points to the direction of the filmstudio

ASA Filmudlejning is a noted Danish film studio founded in 1936 and based in Hellerup, Copenhagen. It produced approximately 90 films between 1936 and 1988 although the bulk of its production was in the 1940s and 1950s. During this period, among its most notable directors were Lau Lauritzen and Alice O'Fredericks. The writer Morten Korch used the studio to turn his books into the family film Far til fire series, that has continued to this day with its fifth generation of actors. With the last movie released in 2018, and one in current production to be released in 2020 making it 20 films in this series alone.

In 1990 film producer Henrik Møller-Sørensen took over ASA Film after a large amount of the company’s studio facilities and property had been sold to the state of Denmark. Since 1991 ASA Film has produced 28 films.

Among the most prolific producers working for ASA were John Olsen and Henning Karmark.
