= List of Danish films of the 1930s =

The following table is a list of films produced in Denmark or in the Danish language in the 1930s. For an alphabetical list of all Danish films currently on Wikipedia see Category:Danish films. For Danish films from other decades see the Cinema of Denmark box above.

Danish Title	English Title	Director(s)	Cast	Genre	Notes
1930
Eskimo	Eskimo	George Schnéevoigt	Mona Mårtenson, Paul Richter	Adventure Romance	First feature-length sound film produced by Denmark (Norwegian dialogue)
1931
Hotel Paradis	Paradise Hotel	George Schnéevoigt	Eyvind Johan-Svendsen, Karen Caspersen, Inger Stender	Drama	
Præsten i Vejlby	The Vicar of Vejlby	George Schnéevoigt	Henrik Malberg, Karin Nellemose	Crime Mystery	First feature-length sound film with Danish dialogue
1932
Odds 777	Odds 777	George Schnéevoigt	Liva Weel, Schiøler Linck, Bodil Kjer	Comedy	
Paustians Uhr					
Skal vi vædde en million?	Do You Want to Bet a Million?	George Schnéevoigt	Frederik Jensen, Marguerite Viby; Hans Kurt	Comedy	
Vampyr	Vampire	Carl Theodor Dreyer	Julian West, Maurice Schutz; Rena Mandel	Horror	
1933
De blaa drenge	The Blue Boy (film)	George Schnéevoigt	Liva Weel, Robert Schmidt; Schiøler Linck, Buster Larsen	Comedy	Debut of Buster Larsen
Kobberbryllup					
Københavnere	The Copenhageners	Lau Lauritzen Sr.	Christian Arhoff, Olga Svendsen; Ib Schønberg	Comedy	
Nyhavn 17					
1934
Nøddebo Præstegård	Nødderbo Rectory	George Schnéevoigt	Johannes Meyer; Karin Nellemose	Family; Christmas	
Ud i den kolde sne		Lau Lauritzen Jr. Alice O'Fredericks	Sigurd Langberg, Aase Clausen	Comedy	Lau Lauritzen Jr.'s directorial debut
1935
Bag Københavns kulisser	Behind Copenhagen's Wings	Arne Weel	Ib Schønberg	Family	
De bør forelske Dem					
Week-end	Week-end	Lau Lauritzen Jr. Alice O'Fredericks	Lau Lauritzen Jr., Ib Schønberg; Poul Reichhardt, Svend Bille	Family	
1936
Giftes-nej tak					
Sol over Danmark	Sun Over Denmark	Holger-Madsen	Henrik Malberg, Albrecht Schmidt, Sigrid Horne-Rasmussen	Comedy	
1937
Den kloge mand					
Der var engang en vicevært	There Once was a Caretaker	Lau Lauritzen Jr. Alice O'Fredericks	Osvald Helmuth, Victor Borge	Family	
Frøken Møllers jubilæum	Miss Møller's Anniversary	Lau Lauritzen Jr. Alice O'Fredericks	Liva Weel, Victor Borge	Family	
Mille, Marie og mig					
Flådens blå matroser					
Inkognito					
1938
Bolettes brudefærd					
Kongen bød					
Champagnegaloppen	The Champagne Gallop	George Schnéevoigt	Svend Methling, Valdemar Møller; Agnes Rehni	Musical	
Under byens tage		Liva Weel			
1939
Komtessen på Stenholt					
I dag begynder livet			Sigfried Johansen		
Nordhavets mænd					
