= The Vicar of Vejlby =

The Vicar of Vejlby may refer to

- The Rector of Veilbye, 1829 crime mystery by Steen Steensen Blicher
- The Vicar of Vejlby (1922 film), film based on the novel
- The Vicar of Vejlby (1931 film), film based on the novel
