= The Vicar of Vejlby (1922 film) =

1922 film by August Blom

Praesten i Vejlby
- 1922 film poster by Palle Wennerwald
- Directed by: August Blom
- Written by: Valdemar Andersen; Steen Steensen Blicher (story)
- Starring: Viggo Wiehe; Gunnar Tolnæs; Ingeborg Spangsfeldt
- Cinematography: Louis Larsen
- Release date: 1922
- Country: Denmark
- Languages: Silent Film; Danish Intertitles

The Vicar of Vejlby (Danish: Præsten i Vejlby) is a 1922 Danish crime mystery film directed by August Blom. It is also known as The Hand of Fate. The silent film is based on a novella of the same name by Steen Steensen Blicher about a true murder case from 1626. Blom filmed the exteriors on location in the area of Grenaa and the village of Vejlby. International audiences praised Blom's adaptation for its "high level artistry," but its faithfulness to the original tragedy was deemed "too excessively sad" for American audiences.

The story was adapted again by George Schnéevoigt (see Praesten i Vejlby (1931 film)), and Claus Ørsted (see Praesten i Vejlby (1972 film)), but the Danish Film Institute considers Blom's version to be closest to the source material.

== Plot ==
The Vicar of Vejlby (1922)

Søren Qvist, a village minister with a short-temper, is accused of murdering his unlikeable servant when the man disappears after an argument. Erik Sørensen, the local judge, reluctantly investigates but he is conflicted because he is happily betrothed to the minister's daughter, Mette. The judge becomes distraught as more and more witnesses offer evidence against the minister. The minister, although he doesn't remember any murder, believes the evidence is undeniable and decides to confess—condemning himself to death. The judge is forced to pass sentence—the pastor is beheaded—and Judge Sørensen's relationship with the woman he loves is destroyed. Twenty years later, the murder victim returns to the village. He reveals his alleged murder was a cruel hoax constructed by his brother as revenge for his rejection as a suitor for Mette.

== Cast ==
Actor	Role
Viggo Wiehe	Søren Quist, Minister of Vejlby
Ingeborg Spangsfeldt	Mette, Minister's Daughter
Gunnar Tolnæs	Judge Erik Sørensen
Clara Schønfeld	Aunt Gertrud
Gerhard Jessen	Morten Bruus
Hans Christian Sørensen	Niels Bruus
Hans Dynesen	Minister of Aalsø
