= Nøddebo Præstegård =

Nøddebo Præstegård may refer to:

- Nøddebo Præstegård (1934 film), a Danish family film Christmas classic
- Nøddebo Præstegård (1974 film), a remake of the above
