= Elith Pio =

Danish actor (1887–1983)

- Born: Nils Sigurd Malmros; 3 July 1887; Copenhagen, Denmark
- Died: 10 February 1983 (aged 95); Denmark
- Occupation: Actor
- Years active: 1907–1969

Viggo Elith William Pio (3 July 1887 – 10 February 1983) was a Danish actor of stage, screen, radio and television. He is most noted for starring roles in films such as Carl Theodor Dreyer's Leaves from Satan's Book, Johan Jacobsen's Jenny and the Soldier and Benjamin Christensen's Häxan.

== Theatre ==
Elith Pio made his theatre debut in 1907 as a member of the Peter Fjelstrup's theater company. He worked in various theaters in Denmark until 1931, when he was employed by the Royal Danish Theatre. He remained a member of the Royal Theatre until his retirement in 1974. Some of his most famous roles were Aristophanes in Johan Ludvig Heiberg's A Soul After the Dead, Dr. Relling and Old Ekdal in Henrik Ibsen's The Wild Duck (Vildanden) and a chamberlain to in Ibsen's The League of Youth (De unges forbund). In Denmark Pio was also well known for his numerous roles on local radio theatre, where his characteristic voice was an invaluable asset.

== Film ==
Pio debuted on screen in the 1908 production of A Folk Tale (Et Folkesagn). Thereafter, he performed in approximately 40 silent films. In 1931, well known from his work at the Royal Theatre, Pio starred in his first sound feature, Hotel Paradis, in the role of Fridolin. From then on he took part in over forty films. In 1947, Pio appeared as the state's attorney in the film Jenny and the Soldier (Soldaten og Jenny) which received the first Bodil Award for Best Danish Film. Pio's last film, The Man Who Thought Life (Manden der tænkte ting) starring John Price, was nominated for the Palme d'Or at the Cannes Film Festival in 1969.

As part of a small group of participants in an emerging Danish cinema, Pio was a favorite of many directors, working more than once with Benjamin Christensen, Viggo Larsen, Mogens Skot-Hansen, Emanuel Gregers, Ole Palsbo, Gabriel Axel, Knud Leif Thomsen, Lau Lauritzen Jr. & Alice O'Fredericks, Svend Methling, and the legendary Carl Theodor Dreyer. He worked four times with director Johan Jacobsen—most notably on Jenny and the Soldier—and four times with director George Schnéevoigt, who had worked as the cinematographer for both of Elith's films with Dreyer. Elith also acted in eight films authored by Danish screenwriter Fleming Lynge, who wrote the 1952 film Meet Me on Cassiopeia.

== Select filmography ==
- Blind Justice (1916)
- Häxan - 1922
- Hotel Paradis - 1931
- Kirke og orgel - 1932
- Tango - 1933
- Kongen bød - 1938
- Et skud før midnat - 1942
- Forellen - 1942
- Tordenskjold går i land - 1942
- Vi kunne ha' det så rart - 1942
- Alt for karrieren - 1943
- Drama på slottet - 1943
- Kriminalassistent Bloch - 1943
- Når man kun er ung - 1943
- Som du vil ha' mig - 1943
- Otte akkorder - 1944
- Biskoppen - 1944
- Affæren Birte - 1945
- Mens sagføreren sover - 1945
- Ta', hvad du vil ha' - 1947
- Soldaten og Jenny - 1947
- For frihed og ret - 1949
- Den opvakte jomfru - 1950
- Familien Schmidt - 1951
- Sønnen - 1953
- Eventyrrejsen - 1960
- Ullabella - 1961
- Løgn og løvebrøl - 1961
- Duellen - 1962
- Tine - 1964
- Dyden går amok - 1966
- Manden der tænkte ting - 1969
