= Schnéevoigt =

Schnéevoigt is a surname. Notable people with the surname include:

- Alf Schnéevoigt (1915–1982), Danish photographer
- Ernst Schnéevoigt (1835-1905), German-born conductor
- Georg Schnéevoigt (1872-1947), Finnish conductor
- George Schnéevoigt (1893-1961), Danish film director
- Siri Schnéevoigt (1893–1961), Danish actor
