= Karen Lykkehus =

Danish actress (1904–1992)

- Born: 22 October 1904; Denmark
- Died: 25 October 1992 (aged 88); Copenhagen
- Resting place: Cemetery of Holmen
- Years active: 1928–1983

Karen Lykkehus (22 October 1904 – 25 October 1992) was a Danish actress. She performed at the Det Ny Theater from 1928 to 1930, and the Frederiksberg Theater. Lykkehus entered film in 1933 in De blaa drenge in which she starred alongside singer Liva Weel.

In 1944 Lykkehus divorced from her husband, which led to a period of instability in her life, involving heavy use of various drugs. She was reportedly close to death when her mother and an old friend intervened, forcing her to go to rehab. Her theatre career had stalled during this period, and Lykkehus returned to the stage in 1958 at Riddersalen.

== Filmography ==
- De blaa drenge (1933)
- Panserbasse (1936)
- Millionærdrengen (1936)
- En lille tilfældighed (1939)
- Jeg har elsket og levet (1940)
- Sommerglæder (1940)
- Gå med mig hjem (1941)
- Søren Søndervold (1942)
- Alt for karrieren (1943)
- Frihed, lighed og Louise (1944)
- Ditte Menneskebarn (1946)
- Tre år efter (1948)
- Altid ballade (1955)
- Blændværk (1955)
- Mig og min familie (1957)
- Det lille hotel (1958)
- Lyssky transport gennem Danmark (1958)
- Paw (1959)
- Eventyrrejsen (1960)
- Eventyr på Mallorca (1961)
- Den rige enke (1962)
- Prinsesse for en dag (1962)
- Det stod i avisen (1962)
- Støv for alle pengene (1963)
- Vi har det jo dejligt (1963)
- En ven i bolignøden (1965)
- Helle for Lykke (1969)
- På'en igen Amalie (1973)
- Pigen og drømmeslottet (1974)
- Nøddebo Præstegård (1974)
- Kun sandheden (1975)
- Familien Gyldenkål (1975)
- Familien Gyldenkål sprænger banken (1976)
- Pas på ryggen, professor (1977)
- Familien Gyldenkål vinder valget (1977)
- Næste stop – Paradis (1980)
- Kurt og Valde (1983)
