= Nøddebo Præstegård (1974 film) =

- Directed by: Peer Guldbrandsen
- Music by: Kai Normann Andersen
- Distributed by: Warner & Constatin
- Release date: 1974
- Running time: 93 min
- Country: Denmark
- Language: Danish

Nøddebo Præstegård (Noedebo vicarage) is a Danish film from 1974, written and directed by Peer Guldbrandsen, based on the novel Ved Nytaarstid i Nøddebo Præstegaard by Henrik Scharling and the stage play by Elith Reumert. It is a remake of the 1934 film. It was shot on location around Greve Præstegård close to Greve Strand in Northeast Sjælland.

== Cast ==
- Lars Høy
- Jens Brenaa
- Michael Lindvad
- Poul Bundgaard
- Birgitte Federspiel
- Merete Voldstedlund
- Lisbet Dahl
- Arthur Jensen
- Ulf Pilgaard
- Paul Hagen
- Kirsten Rolffes
- Karl Stegger
- Karen Lykkehus
- Judy Gringer
- Lizzi Varencke
- Ebba With
- Susanne Jagd
- Lise Thomsen
