= Sigfred Johansen =

Danish actor (1908–1953)

- Born: 31 May 1908; Frederiksberg, Denmark
- Died: 18 July 1953 (aged 45)
- Years active: 1932–1948

Sigfred Johansen (31 May 1908 – 18 July 1953), was a Danish film actor of the 1930s and 1940s.

== Filmography ==
- Odds 777 (1932)
- De blaa drenge (1933)
- Nyhavn 17 (1933)
- De bør forelske Dem (1935)
- Bag Københavns kulisser (1935)
- Week-end (1935)
- Giftes-nej tak (1936)
- Flådens blå matroser (1937)
- Inkognito (1937)
- I dag begynder livet (1939)
- Pas på svinget i Solby (1940)
- Familien Olsen (1940)
- En pige med pep (1940)
- Tag det som en mand (1941)
- Tak fordi du kom Nick (1941)
- Tante Cramers testamente (1942)
- Alt for karrieren (1943)
- Oktoberroser (1946)
- Hans store aften (1946)
- Jenny and the Soldier (1947)
- Hr. Petit (1948)
