= Robert Schmidt (actor) =

Danish actor (1882–1941)

- Born: Robert Henrik Schmidt; 24 April 1882; Copenhagen, Denmark
- Died: 17 November 1941 (aged 59)

Robert Henrik Schmidt (24 April 1882 - 17 November 1941) was a Danish stage and film actor of the silent period and early sound period in Denmark.

His last film was in 1933 in the George Schnéevoigt directed film De blaa drenge in which he starred alongside Liva Weel.

== Selected filmography ==
- David Copperfield (1922)
- The Clown (1926)
- Hotel Paradis (1931)
