= Svend Melsing =

Danish actor, theatre director and playwright (1888-1946)

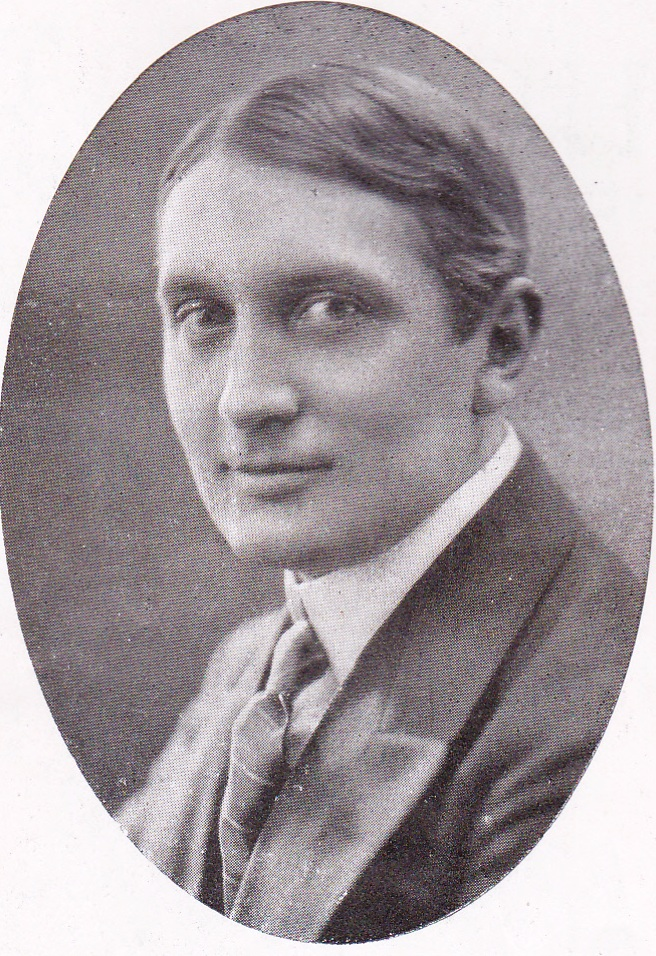
- Born: Svend Nielsen; 24 December 1888; Fredericia, Denmark
- Died: 8 June 1946 (aged 57); Frederiksberg, Denmark
- Occupations: Actor, playwright, theatre director
- Years active: 1906-1944

Svend Melsing (27 December 1888 – 8 June 1946) was a Danish stage and film actor, theatre director and playwright whose career spanned nearly forty years.

== Early life ==
Born Svend Nielsen in Fredericia, Denmark, he was the son of Peder Nielsen, who was an army infantry captain and military commander, and Marie Hansine Rose. His father died in 1901 when Melsing was thirteen. At age eighteen he changed his surname from Nielsen to Melsing. He began studying acting under the tutelage of Danish stage actress Soffy Walleen and was a student at the Royal Danish Theatre School in Copenhagen from 1910 until 1912.

== Stage career ==
Melsing made his theatre debut at the Royal Danish Theatre on 10 March 1912 as the character Albert Ebbesen in Johan Ludvig Heiberg's 1828 comedy Elverhøi (Elves' Hill). He would continue as an actor at the Royal Danish Theatre until 1914, followed by an engagement at the Dagmarteatret from 1914 until 1926 and the Casino Theatre during the 1926–1927 season. He would also do several tours with the Betty Nansen Teatret, Det Ny Teater and the Casino Theatre. From 1938 until 1943 he would become the winter season theatre director of the Frederiksberg Theatre and director of the Allé-Scenen Teater from January until July 1944.

Apart from performing in and directing stage plays, Melsing also wrote several plays; among them, Det evigt kvindelige, De kloge og vi gale, Jul paa Ravnsholt and Søndagsparadiset.

== Film career ==
In 1912, Melsing began performing in motion pictures for Nordisk Film. His first role at Nordisk was in the 1912 August Blom directed comedy short Direktørens Datter, starring Carl Alstrup and Karen Poulsen. He would go on to appear in over thirty films at Nordisk until 1920, often in prominent roles, before signing with Palladium Film in 1924. His first film for Palladium was the 1924 Lau Lauritzen directed comedy Professor Petersens Plejebørn, in which he plays Professor Petersen opposite actors Oscar Stribolt, Carl Schenstrøm and Maria Garland. His most popular role at Palladium was as the character Cardenio in Lau Lauritzen's 1926 silent film adaptation of Don Quixote. He would continue in roles in silent film throughout the 1920s, making his first and only sound film in 1931's George Schnéevoigt's drama Hotel Paradis. After retiring from film, he would return to the Frederiksberg Theatre and the Allé-Scenen Teater as a director and actor.

In 1945, his play De kloge og vi gale was adapted into a film by Lau Lauritzen, Jr. and Alice O'Fredericks for Spillefilm, and starred Poul Reumert.

== Death ==
For the last three years of his life, Svend Melsing began suffering from a series of ailments. In 1944 he retired from his position at the Allé-Scenen Teater. He died in Frederiksberg on 8 June 1946 at age 57.
