= Inga Arvad =

Danish newspaper reporter and gossip columnist (1913–1973)

- Born: Inga Marie Arvad Petersen; 6 October 1913; Copenhagen, Denmark
- Died: 12 December 1973 (aged 60); Nogales, Arizona, U.S.
- Spouses: Kamal Abdel Nabi (m. 1931, divorced) Paul Fejos (m. 1936; div. 1942) Tim McCoy (m. 1947)
- Children: 2

Inga Marie Arvad Petersen (6 October 1913 – 12 December 1973) was a Danish-American journalist who was a guest of Adolf Hitler at the 1936 Summer Olympics and also had a romantic relationship with John F. Kennedy in 1941 and 1942. The juxtaposition of these facts led to suspicions during World War II that she was a Nazi spy. Secret U.S. investigations uncovered no such evidence, and her past did not harm her professional life or social standing in the United States. She was a motion picture writer for Metro-Goldwyn-Mayer in 1945 and a Hollywood gossip columnist, and from the late 1940s until her death, she was the wife of wealthy cowboy actor and military officer Tim McCoy.

== Career ==
Arvad was the 1931 beauty queen selected by the Danish newspaper Berlingske Tidende. She attended the Columbia School of Journalism in New York and then moved to Washington D.C., where she worked as a columnist at the Washington Times-Herald. She met John F. Kennedy in Washington through his sister Kathleen, who was a reporter at the same newspaper. Arvad was said to have a good "intuitive style of writing" by her editor.

In 1935, as a freelance reporter, she interviewed Hitler, and this connection would color the rest of her life. She is thought to be among the few Scandinavians who interviewed Hitler. He granted her two or, perhaps, three interviews. Arvad had scooped her colleagues earlier by reporting that Hermann Göring was soon to marry German actress Emmy Sonnemann.

She was invited to the wedding and met important Nazis. Through Joseph Goebbels, she secured an interview with Hitler. In her article, a description of Hitler was later translated into English: "You immediately like him. He seems lonely. The eyes, showing a kind heart, stare right at you. They sparkle with force." Arvad was Hitler's guest at the 1936 Summer Olympics, which led to her being investigated by the FBI in America as a potential spy. Hitler had told her that she was a perfect example of Nordic beauty. A photograph of her with Hitler surfaced, and the FBI followed her, finding out that she was dating John F. Kennedy, a well-connected young American Naval officer with the rank of Ensign, who was the son of the former U.S. ambassador to Britain. Kennedy's prominence led only to greater scrutiny of Arvad and suspicions about her that were never substantiated. Though she wrote only society news and never embraced Hitler's politics, the connection to him shadowed her professional life.

== Romance with John F. Kennedy and FBI investigation ==
In November 1941, while John F. Kennedy served as an ensign in the U.S. Navy's Office of Naval Intelligence, he and Arvad began a romantic relationship. The FBI was already following Arvad because she was a resident alien. FBI Director J. Edgar Hoover expressed concerns that she was a German spy, given her contact with Adolf Hitler. When the FBI discovered that the "Ensign Jack" who had been visiting Arvad was, in fact, John F. Kennedy, they extended their investigation through wiretaps. No evidence was found to show Arvad, who was still married to Paul Fejos, was guilty of "any wrongdoing". However, that did not deter Hoover's FBI from using listening devices when Arvad and Kennedy were together.

Kennedy's superior officer, Captain Seymour A. D. Hunter, said that the U.S. Navy viewed Arvad as similar to Mata Hari. They thought she was using Kennedy to find out all she could about what was happening in the Navy Department. Captain Howard Klingman, then assistant director of the Office of Naval Intelligence, called Hunter into his office. Hunter was told that Kennedy needed to be put out of the Navy. Hunter pointed out that the situation was delicate because of Kennedy's father, Joseph P. Kennedy, having been United States Ambassador to the United Kingdom. However, he believed the young naval intelligence officer was not privy to information that would be "more than a bit embarrassing". Hunter advised that Kennedy be transferred to a seagoing unit.

Kennedy was reassigned to a desk job in South Carolina in January 1942, and the relationship with Arvad ended after a few brief encounters. Kennedy later stated he thought Hoover might have had something to do with his transfer. Arvad later reflected on her time with Kennedy as a "passing affair".

== Personal life ==
Arvad's first husband was Kamal Abdel Nabi, whom she married in 1931 when she was 17. Her second marriage was to Hungarian film director Paul Fejos, whom she married on 28 January 1936 in Copenhagen, Denmark. She appeared in two Danish films, Storm Varsel and a Fejos-directed 1934 film Flight from the Millions. She was still married to Fejos when she traveled to the United States and during her affair with Kennedy. She obtained a divorce from Fejos in June 1942.

Arvad became a naturalized citizen of the United States on 5 March 1945.

She became engaged to Robert Boothby, a British member of Parliament, in May 1945. He met Arvad in Los Angeles while he was with a British delegation to a conference in San Francisco, California. Boothby sent her a 20-page letter pleading with her to marry him after he returned to England. Arvad accepted but then broke off the engagement because of a compliment Hitler once paid her as being "the perfect Nordic beauty" and the effect it might have on Boothby's political career. Arvad commented that she despised Hitler's policies and only saw him on the two occasions of her interviews; however, the English press made much of her audience with him and Boothby was soon to be seeking re-election. Arvad was suspected of being the mistress of Axel Wenner-Gren, a Swedish industrialist on the U.S. State Department blocklist. No proof of such a relationship has surfaced.

Arvad married American actor Tim McCoy on 14 Feb 1947 in Yonkers, Westchester County, New York, though McCoy claimed they were married earlier. They met when McCoy was making a film short shot on a Native American reservation. McCoy and Arvad resided on a 127-acre (0.51 km^{2}) estate in Bucks County, Pennsylvania named Dolington Manor, also known as the Benjamin Taylor Homestead. McCoy moved there after selling his Wyoming ranch, the Eagle's Nest, where he had lived for 37 years. Arvad and McCoy had two sons, Ronald and Terence. When their first child was born in August 1947, McCoy was 56. He had three children from his previous marriage to Agnes Miller, daughter of actress Bijou Heron.

In January 1946, David O. Selznick sent Arvad on a tour of 25 to 30 American cities to promote Duel in the Sun. She was accompanied by Anita Colby, Florence Pritchett, and Laura Wells.

== Death ==
Inga Arvad died of cancer on a ranch near Nogales, Arizona, in 1973. Her husband and their two sons survived her. She was buried in Mount Olivet Cemetery in Saginaw, Michigan.
