= The Man at Midnight (1924 film) =

1924 film

- Directed by: Holger-Madsen
- Written by: Marie Luise Droop; Holger-Madsen
- Starring: Hella Moja; Olaf Fjord; Henrik Malberg
- Cinematography: Willy Goldberger
- Production company: Eiko Film
- Release date: 1924
- Country: Germany
- Languages: Silent; German intertitles

The Man at Midnight (German: Der Mann um Mitternacht) is a 1924 German silent film directed by Holger-Madsen and starring Hella Moja, Olaf Fjord and Henrik Malberg.

The film's sets were designed by Alfred Junge.

== Cast ==
- Hella Moja as Elsa
- Olaf Fjord as Helge Bjoernstad
- Henrik Malberg as Knut Hammerdal
- Holger-Madsen as Lighthouse keeper
- Karl Etlinger as Ole
- Claire Rommer as Ingrid
- Erling Hanson as Sigurd Hoff
- Adolphe Engers
- Claus Hemmersbach as The lad

== Bibliography ==
- Hans-Michael Bock and Tim Bergfelder. The Concise Cinegraph: An Encyclopedia of German Cinema. Berghahn Books.
