= Jeg har elsket og levet =

1940 film

- Poster
- Directed by: George Schnéevoigt
- Written by: Fleming Lynge
- Starring: Erling Schroeder
- Cinematography: Valdemar Christensen; Poul Eibye
- Edited by: Valdemar Christensen; Carl H. Petersen
- Music by: C.E.F. Weyse
- Distributed by: Nordisk Film
- Release date: 17 December 1940
- Running time: 95 minutes
- Country: Denmark
- Language: Danish

Jeg har el sket og levet is a 1940 Danish family film directed by George Schnéevoigt. The film stars Erling Schroeder and Johannes Meyer.

== Cast ==
- Erling Schroeder as C.E.F. Weyse
- Ellen Gottschalch as Henriette Frisch
- Johannes Meyer as Tutein
- Mary Alice Therp as Lucia Tutein
- Bjarne Forchhammer as Friederich Tutein
- Tove Bang as Pauline Tutein
- Inger Stender as Emilie Tutein
- Edith Oldrup Pedersen as Julie Tutein
- Aksel Schiøtz as Herman Kramer
- Angelo Bruun as Wilhelm Nolthenius
- Edvin Tiemroth as Adam Oehlenschläger
- Børge Munch Petersen as Knud Lyhne Rahbek
- Karen Lykkehus as Kamma Rahbek
- Hans Kurt as du Puy
- Carl Viggo Meincke as Kofoed
- Asmund Rostrup as Søren Hertz
- Thorkil Lauritzen as Buntzen
- Victor Montell as Tørring
- Kristian as Hans Søstersøn
- Carl Madsen as a coachman
