= Edith Oldrup =

Danish operatic soprano

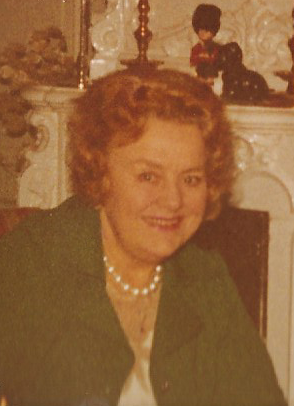
Edith Oldrup in 1977

Edith Johanne Oldrup-Björling (18 June 1912 – 4 June 1999) was a Danish operatic soprano. She made her début at the Royal Danish Opera in 1935 where she performed until 1949. She is remembered in particular for her roles in the operas of Mozart and Puccini. Oldrup made over 60 recordings.

== Biography ==
Born in Copenhagen on 18 June 1912, Edith Johanne Oldrup Pedersen was the daughter of Charles Peter Ferdinand Oldrup Pedersen (1885-1946) and Hulda Marie Larsen (1885-1969). She was brought up in a well-to-do area of Frederiksberg. After attending the French School until she was 16, she studied song and dance under the operatic tenor Vilhelm Herold. When she was 20, she entered the Opera Academy at the Royal Theatre where she made her début in 1934 as Micaëla in Carmen, becoming an immediate success.

Her most effective roles were those in the Mozart operas, especially Fiordiligi and Despina in Cosi fan tutte, Papagena in The Magic Flute, Zerlina in Don Giovanni and Susanna in The Marriage of Figaro. She also excelled in Puccini's works, as Mimi in La bohème and the title role in Madame Butterfly.

During her 15 years with the Royal Theatre, Oldrup performed in some 40 different roles. Many recordings were made in connection with the film Jeg har elsket og levet tracing the life of Christoph Ernst Friedrich Weyse.

In 1949, Oldrup married the Swedish baritone opera singer Sigurd Carl Björling and moved to Sweden. Thereafter she performed only as a guest in both Denmark and in Sweden where she her performances at Drottningholm Palace Theatre were greatly appreciated. Later she served as a music consultant to the Gladsakse Music School and as a voice teacher in Helsingborg.

Edith Oldrup died on 4 June 1999 in Helsingborg, Sweden.

== Awards ==
In 1949, Oldrup received the Tagea Brandt Rejselegat. In 1960, she was honoured as a Knight of the Dannebrog and in 1964, she received the Drottningholm Medal in gold.
