= Giv Gud en chance om søndagen =

- Directed by: Henrik Stangerup
- Written by: Henrik Stangerup; Jørgen Stegelmann
- Produced by: Peer Guldbrandsen
- Starring: Henning Moritzen
- Music by: Patrick Gowers
- Distributed by: Asa Studio
- Release date: 22 April 1970
- Running time: 94 minutes
- Country: Denmark
- Language: Danish

Giv Gud en chance om søndagen is a 1970 Danish film. The title is Danish for "Give God a chance on Sunday".

It stars Ulf Pilgaard, Ove Sprogøe and Lotte Tarp.

== Cast ==
- Ulf Pilgaard – Rev. Niels Riesing
- Lotte Tarp – Hanne Riesing
- Vibeke Reumert – Hanne's Mother
- Ove Sprogøe – Præst ved Roskilde Domkirke
- Ole Storm – Thorsen
- Rachel Bæklund – Fru Thorsen
- Erik Nørgaard – Lærer Petersen
- Ebbe Kløvedal Reich – Himself
- Erik Halskov-Jensen – Arbejder I grusgrav
- Annelise Halskov-Jensen – Arbejderens kone
- Knud Jansen – Rideskoleeje
- Leif Mønsted – Vækkelsesprædikant
- Niels Ufer – Teolog
- Jørgen Schleimann – Teolog
- Arne Skovhus – Teolog
- Johannes Møllehave – Teolog
- Karl Andersen – Stoffer
- Vilhelm Rigels – Organist
- Henrik Stangerup – Kistebærer
- Ole Michelsen
- Pernille Kløvedal
