= Flight from the Millions =

1934 film

- Directed by: Pál Fejös
- Written by: Pál Fejös
- Starring: Inga Arvad; Erling Schroeder; Tudlik Johansen
- Edited by: Lothar Wolff
- Music by: Ferenc Farkas
- Production company: Nordisk Film
- Release date: 22 December 1934
- Country: Denmark
- Language: Danish

Flight from the Millions (Danish: Flugten fra millionerne) is a 1934 Danish comedy film directed and written by Pál Fejös and starring Inga Arvad, Erling Schroeder and Tudlik Johansen. It was one of three films made in Denmark by the Hungarian director Fejös along with Prisoner Number One and The Golden Smile. It was made by Nordisk Film, the largest Danish studio. The film's sets were designed by the art director Heinz Fenchel.

== Cast ==
- Inga Arvad as Lilian
- Erling Schroeder as John
- Tudlik Johansen as Anna
- Christian Arhoff as Kammertjener James
- Johannes Meyer as Præsident for Papegøjesamfundet
- Kai Holm as Matros
- Rasmus Christiansen as Onkel
- Peter Nielsen as Onkel
- Aage Foss as Onkel
- Regnar Bjelke as Onkel
- Maria Garland as Tante
- Agnes Rehni as Tante
- Mary Alice Therp as Tante
- Ingeborg Pehrson as Tante
- Albrecht Schmidt as Notar
- Knud Heglund as Overtjener

== Bibliography ==
- Cunningham, John. Hungarian Cinema: From Coffee House to Multiplex. Wallflower Press, 2004.
- Georges Sadoul & Peter Morris. Dictionary of Film Makers. University of California Press, 1972.
