= Kai Normann Andersen =

Danish film composer (1900-1967)

- Born: 11 April 1900; Copenhagen
- Died: 24 June 1967 (aged 67); Frederiksberg
- Years active: 1930–1965

Kai Normann Andersen (11 April 1900 – 24 June 1967) was a Danish composer who wrote film scores and music for stage revues and dramas. He composed songs for over 50 films between 1930 and 1965. In the 1930s and 1940s he dominated Danish film music. He has been called "[o]ne of the most appealing personalities of our time in the light music field". Twelve of his songs have been included in the Danish Culture Canon. Connie Hedegaard and Claus Hagen Petersen list him among the 100 most important Danes of the 20th century.

== Career ==
Andersen was originally a bank clerk, but began composing for revues, studied music, and in 1919 became a full-time musician. He became director of revue productions in Copenhagen before extending his range into film and plays (by Kaj Munk and Kjeld Abell amongst others).

He composed songs for over 50 films between 1930 and 1965. In the 1930s and 1940s, he dominated Danish film music. In the 1930s, he contributed prolifically to the score of films directed by George Schnéevoigt (1893–1961) including Præsten i Vejlby, Hotel Paradis - 1931, Skal vi vædde en million? - 1932, Kirke og orgel - 1932, Odds 777 - 1932, De blaa drenge - 1933, Kobberbryllup - 1933 and the Christmas film Nøddebo Præstegård in 1934. Songs he composed for Mød mig på Cassiopeia (Meet Me on Cassiopeia, 1951) remain hits in Denmark.

He was married to the Norwegian actress Lilly Bergliot Skands from 1920 to 1936. He lived with actress Ellen Gottschalch from 1932 until his death in 1967. He is buried in the Frederiksberg Ældre Kirkegård (cemetery).

== Selected songs ==
Andersen wrote over 900 songs. Here is a selected list of his works:

- "Stemningsmelodi"
- "Pige træd varsomt"
- "Lille du"
- "Glemmer du"
- "Den allersidste dans"
- "I dit korte liv"
- "Der var engang"
- "Musens sang"
- "Du gamle måne"
- "Titte til hinanden"
- "Jeg har elsket dig så længe jeg kan mindes"
- "At elske er at leve"
- "Gå med i lunden"
- "Kammerat vær en mand"
- "Åh hvor jeg ih hvor jeg uh hvor jeg vil"
- "God morgen god morgen"
- "Jeg har en ven"
- "Man binder os på hånd og mund"
- "Jeg gir mit humør en gang lak"
- "Jeg ku bli noget så 1-2-3"
- "Alle går rundt og forelsker sig"
- "Flyv min hest"
- "Gå ud og gå en tur"
- "De små små smil"
- "Den gamle skærslippers forårssang"
- "Så sødt som i gamle dage"
