= Else Højgaard =

Danish actress and ballerina (1906–1979)

- Højgaard performs in Stravinsky's Firebird at the Royal Danish Theatre in 1928.
- Born: Else Andreasen; 18 April 1906; Bornholm, Denmark
- Died: 11 July 1979 (aged 73); Bornholm, Denmark
- Years active: 1928–1972

Else Højgaard (18 April 1906–11 July 1979) was a Danish ballerina and an actress of stage and screen. Noted for a fiery temperament and edgy intensity, Højgaard premiered as a solo ballerina for George Balanchine in 1931 and was the primary dancer for Harald Lander until 1942. Højgaard later went on to a long career as a dramatic actress, performing and teaching at the Royal Danish Theatre. She performed in radio and television, and played supporting roles in several films including the dark drama Café Paradis (1950). Højgaard was awarded a knighthood in the Order of the Dannebrog in 1961 and promoted to Knight 1st Class in 1971.

== Ballet career ==
Højgaard was born Else Andreasen on 18 April 1906 on Bornholm, Denmark, the daughter of a civil attorney. At the age of 12, Højgaard became a student at the Royal Danish Theatre ballet school in Copenhagen and graduated in 1929. She debuted in the role of Amelie in the 1928 production of Drømmebilleder and was chosen to perform the solo of Terpsichore in George Balanchine's 1931 staging of Apollon Musagete. Following that performance, Højgaard was a solo ballerina for the Royal Danish Ballet until her retirement from ballet performance in 1942. She was the primary dancer for Harald Lander's revival of the August Bournonville ballets. Known for a fiery temperament, she was noted for her highly dramatic and lyrical performances, lending a modern, anti-romantic presentation to her roles.

== Acting career ==
While employed as a ballerina, Højgaard also attended the Royal Danish Theatre's drama school from 1932 to 1934 and made her stage debut in Anker Larsen's Son of Zeus (1935). She later performed as the dancer Arabella in the 1938 film musical Champagnegaloppen. However, it wasn't until she left the ballet in 1942 that Højgaard dedicated herself to acting and demonstrated a dramatic stage presence that was "independent", "indestructible", and "almost defiant." Noted performances included the Karen Blixen-like character of Julia in T.S. Eliot's The Cocktail Party and the emotional sister Irene in Søskende (1952). Højgaard performed in both radio and television, and she was an instructor for 16 years at the Royal Danish Theatre until 1967. In 1971, at the age of 65, Højgaard returned to ballet to perform the role of Old Woman in Dødens triumf (The Triumph of Death). In 1961, Højgaard was awarded knighthood in the Order of the Dannebrog and in 1972, she was promoted to Knight of the First Degree.

During a career that spanned four decades, Højgaard performed supporting roles in several films. According to cinema historian Morten Piils, the edgy nervousness and intensity of Højgaard's appearance prevented her from being offered lead roles in films. However, her few roles were often memorable performances, such as that of the judgmental Agnes in the darkly dramatic Danish masterpiece Café Paradis. Her final performance was in the 1972 children's film Mig og Charley. Højgaard died on 11 July 1979 at the age of 73 during a fire at her summer house on Bornholm.

== Personal life ==
Højgaard married the businessman Anders Christian Emil Højgaard on 14 December 1926, however they divorced less than two years later. She was married a second time in 1939 with shoe manufacturer Willy Johannes Madsen until his death in 1974. Later, she married the violinist and choir director Henrik Reinholdt Sachsenskjold, but that marriage also ended in divorce. Højgaard was the half-sister to Danish stage director Søren Melson and sister-in-law of Gull-Maj Norin.

== Filmography ==
Year	Film	Role	Other notes
1938	Champagnegaloppen	Arabella the Dancer	In her first screen role, Højgaard was typecast to play a dancer in a musical about the Danish composer H.C. Lumbye.
1950	Café Paradis	Agnes	In this dark film about alcoholism, Højgaard played the harshly judgmental sister. The film won the Bodil Award for Best Danish Film of 1950.
1956	Ung leg	Helle's Mother	Højgaard plays the mother of the lead actress (Ghita Norby in her debut), in a story that blames irresponsible parents for the wild, delinquency of teenagers.
1964	Tine	(The Voice)	
1967	The Red Mantle		Højgaard's performance was uncredited in this medieval drama. The film was nominated for the Palme D'Or at Cannes.
1967	Resan	Woman in Copenhagen	
1968	A Sparrow Doing a Crane Dance	Queen Gunnhild	A television production of Jens Christian Hostrup's satire in which the ghost of Queen Gunnhild gives a magical ring to a scheming tailor and makes everyone blind to his actions.
1970	The Performance Will Be Followed by a Dance	Hertha	
1975	Nothing But the Truth	Mikkelsen	
1978	Did Somebody Laugh?	Ella	
1978	Charly and Me	Majbritt's Grandmother	This children's film received the Bodil Award for the Best Danish Film of 1978.
