= Inger Stender =

Danish actress

- Born: Inger Margueritha Stender; 7 July 1912; Copenhagen, Denmark
- Died: 26 June 1989 (aged 76); Copenhagen, Denmark
- Years active: 1931 — 1980
- Spouse: Mogens Flindt-Larsen
- Children: 2

Inger Stender (1912–1989) was a Danish actress of stage, film and television whose sophisticated elegance and classic beauty earned her the description of Denmark's version of Marlene Dietrich.

== Early life ==
Inger Margueritha Stender was born 7 June 1912 in Copenhagen, Denmark, the daughter of a baker. She attended drama classes from 1929 to 1931 at the student schools for the Komediehuset (Comedy House) and Det Ny Teater (The New Theater), then made her stage debut at Det Ny Teater on 24 April 1931 in the role of Flora in C.E. Soya's Kendt Navne.

== Career ==
=== Theater ===
Beginning in the 1930s, Stender was an actress for several stage companies throughout Denmark, including the Riddersalen, Odense Theater, Apollo Theater, Aalborg Theater and Aarhus Theater. She was a prolific and versatile stage actress, playing roles in Uncle Tom's Cabin, Tartuffe, and Henry IV as well as cabarets and comedies. In one season alone at the Odense Theater (1934–1935), Stender played 14 leading roles and received critical success as The Ship's Boy in Alle Mand på Dæk (All Hands on Deck). Stender also became an operetta star when she sang the title role in Den Skønne Helene (The Beautiful Helena) and was Zorina in Zorina.

=== Film ===
Stender made her film debut in 1931 as the daughter Rosa in Hotel Paradis. The following year, at the age of 20, Stender played her first leading role as the sweet heroine in the Liva Weel farce Odds 777. Throughout the 1930s and the early 1940s, she continued to be cast as the charming young girl in such films as Benjamin Christensen's Barnet and the Herman Bang story, Sommerglæder. It was in her next film that Stender finally caught the type of role for which she would become known—the 1943 Marguerite Viby comedy Som du vil ha' mig -! (However You Would Have Me-!), in which she played the sophisticated, and a little too intimate society girl.

Danish film historian Morten Piil described Stender's onscreen persona as blonde, beautiful and sophisticated with an almost aristocratic elegance yet a "mischievous twinkle" in her eyes. He refers to her as the Danish version of Marlene Dietrich. Stender continued to reprise this persona as the opera singer in Så mødes vi hos Tove, the rash society dame in Foldboldpræsten and the threatening woman in Fra den gamle købmandsgård (1951). However, Stender said that her desire was to play a light comedy part like the lead in the Noël Coward operetta Bitter Sweet, but that newspaper reviews focused so much on her beauty that it perhaps prevented her from receiving more varied roles.

I would like to have a light comedy role as the funny girl. I'm actually not nearly as boring as I look.

— Inger Stender, Ekstra Bladet, 1946

Stender performed in film and television in the 1970s, but in smaller roles of matronly or maternal characters. She made 38 films over a span of six decades, with her final role in 1981 in the Danish television series Matador.

== Personal life ==
Stender married Mogens Flindt-Larsen in 1935 and they had two sons together. They divorced in 1940. Stender maintained a longterm romantic relationship with the Danish actor Poul Reichhardt with whom she appeared in the 1941 film Moster fra Mols. Stender died on 26 June 1989 at the age of 76 and is buried in Søndermark Kirkegård in Frederiksborg Denmark.

== Filmography ==
- Hotel Paradis − 1931
- Odds 777 − 1932
- Lynet − 1934
- Der var engang en vicevært − 1937
- Mille, Marie og mig − 1937
- Komtessen på Stenholt − 1939
- Jeg har elsket og levet − 1940
- Sommerglæder − 1940
- En pige med pep − 1940
- Barnet − 1940
- En mand af betydning − 1941
- Thummelumsen − 1941
- Natekspressen (P. 903) − 1942
- En pige uden lige − 1943
- Som du vil ha' mig − 1943
- Moster fra Mols − 1943
- Alt for karrieren − 1943
- Så mødes vi hos Tove − 1946
- Fodboldpræsten − 1951
- Fra den gamle købmandsgård − 1951
- Jan går til filmen − 1954
- Ung kærlighed − 1958
- Peters baby − 1961
- Cirkus Buster − 1961
- Kampen om Næsbygaard − 1964
- Mord for åbent tæppe − 1964
- Don Olsen kommer til byen − 1964
- Næsbygaards arving − 1965
- Krybskytterne på Næsbygaard − 1966
- Midt i en jazztid − 1969
- Christa − 1970
- Farlige kys − 1972
- I din fars lomme − 1973
- Strømer − 1976
- Terror − 1977
- Slægten − 1978
- Næste stop − Paradis − 1980
- Sådan er jeg osse − 1980
