= Erling Schroeder =

Danish actor (1904–1989)

- Born: Poul Erling Rolf Schroeder; 1 March 1904; Frederiksberg, Denmark
- Died: 17 October 1989
- Years active: 1932–1972

Erling Schroeder (1 March 1904 – 17 October 1989), was a Danish film actor.

== Filmography ==
- I kantonnement – 1932
- Han, hun og Hamlet – 1932
- Med fuld musik – 1933
- Københavnere – 1933
- Fem raske piger – 1933
- Flight from the Millions – 1934
- En lille tilfældighed – 1939
- Sørensen og Rasmussen – 1940
- Jeg har elsket og levet – 1940
- Alle går rundt og forelsker sig – 1941
- En søndag på Amager – 1941
- Som du vil ha' mig – 1943
- Jeg mødte en morder – 1943
- Otte akkorder – 1944
- En ny dag gryer – 1945
- I går og i morgen – 1945
- Lykke på rejsen – 1947
- Tre piger i Paris – 1963
- Og så er der bal bagefter – 1970
- Nu går den på Dagmar – 1972
