= Viggo Wiehe =

Danish actor (1874–1956)

- Born: Viggo Hjalmar Wiehe; 23 December 1874; Copenhagen, Denmark
- Died: 30 November 1956 (aged 81); Copenhagen, Denmark
- Occupation: Actor
- Years active: 1897–1947
- Spouse: Anna Marie Reich Christiansen (m. 1912–1956)

Viggo Hjalmar Wiehe (23 December 1874 – 30 November 1956) was a Danish stage and film actor whose career spanned over five decades.

== Career ==
Born in Copenhagen, Denmark, he was the son of actor and opera singer Johan Henrik Wiehe and Fanny Wiehe (née Petersen). He began his stage career as a dramatic actor under the tutelage of Karl Mantzius and Olaf Poulsen from 1897 to 1899 and later studied at the Danish Royal Theatre. He made his stage debut at the Folketeatret (People's Theatre) in a production by writer Herman Bang in 1899. He was then engaged at Oddgeir Stephensen's theater company, and from 1922 to 1923 at the Odense Folketeater, Odense Theatre, and then among other theatres throughout Denmark such as the Dagmar Theatre, Casino Theatre and Det ny Teater (The New Theatre) in Copenhagen.

Wiehe began appearing in films in 1912 and from 1912 to 1930, he appeared in approximately twenty-five silent films. One of his most popular starring roles of the silent film era was that of Søren Qvist, a village minister with a short-temper who is accused of murdering his unlikeable servant in the 1922 August Blom-directed mystery Praesten i Vejlby (The Vicar of Vejlby). Wiehe is often also recalled for his role as Count de Chambord in director Carl Theodor Dreyer's 1921 drama Leaves from Satan's Book. Wiehe made the transition to sound film with relative ease and spent the 1930s appearing in several roles in Danish films, as well as continuing his career on stage. His last film before retiring was a small role in Lau Lauritzen, Sr.-directed Røverne fra Rold.

== Personal life ==
Viggo Wiehe was married Danish actress Anna Marie Reich Christiansen (1883 – 1962) on 31 October 1912 in Frederiksberg Church in Copenhagen. The couple remained married until his death in 1956 at the age of 81. He was buried at the Holmens Kirkegård cemetery in Østerbro.
