= Hedevig Quiding =

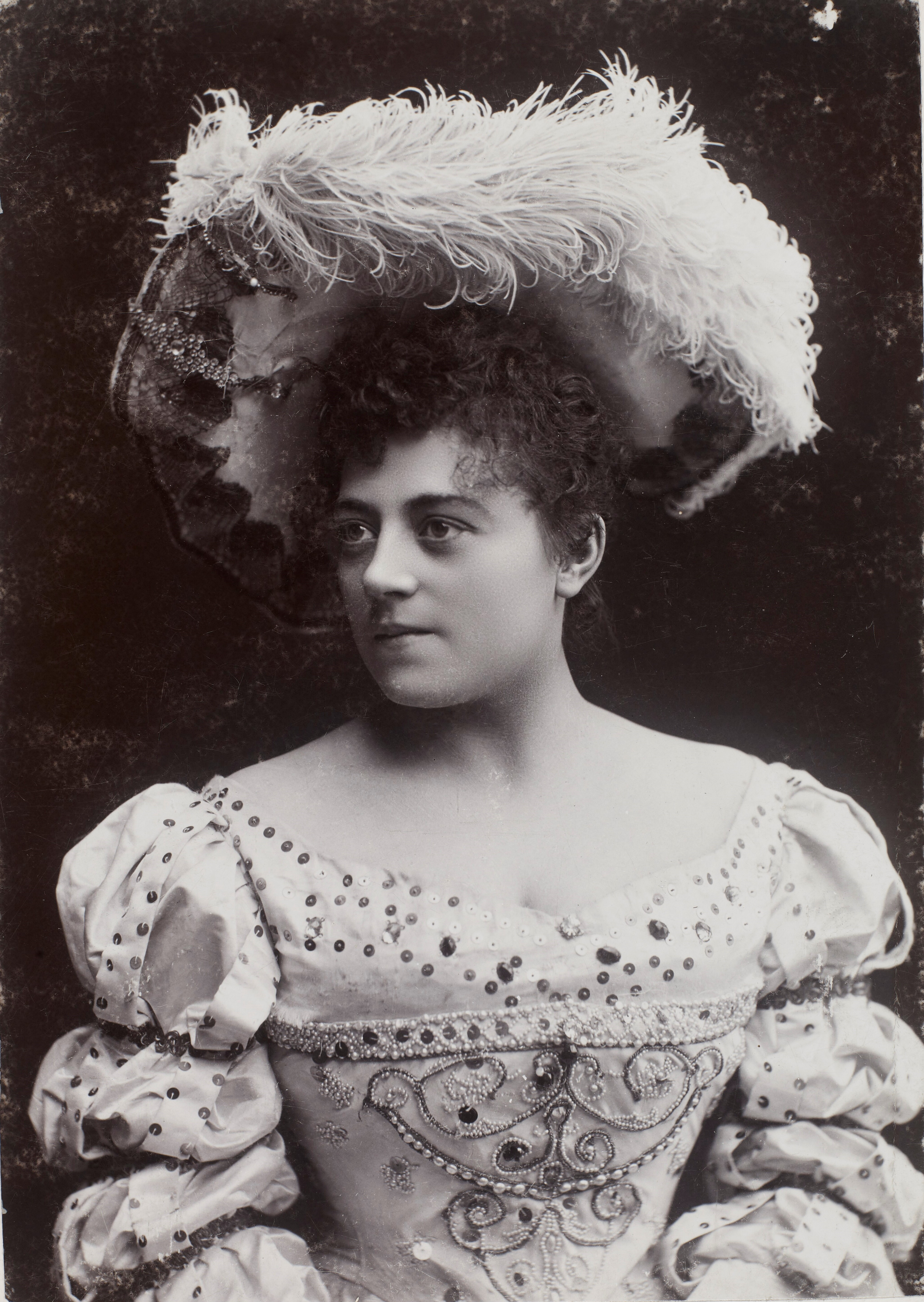
Hedevig Quiding (1895)

Hedevig Faaborg Quiding née Springborg (16 September 1867 – 3 October 1936) was a Danish operatic soprano, voice instructor and music critic. When she was 19, she made her debut at the Royal Danish Opera as Philine in Ambroise Thomas' Mignon but then moved to Germany where over the next ten years she performed some 40 roles in the opera houses of Berlin, Munich and Nuremberg. On returning to Denmark, from the turn of the century she retired from the stage to become an effective voice and stagecraft instructor and from the 1920s an influential music critic. In later years, she concentrated on writing and on making radio broadcasts.

== Early life, family and education ==
Born on 16 September 1867, Hedevig Springborg was the daughter of the clockmaker Andreas Nicolai Springborg (1836–1903) and Marie Christine Hamsted (1838–1935). She married twice, first in January 1886 with the Swedish glove manufacturer Nils Peter Axel Quiding (1858–1892), and then in October 1898 with the journalist and museum curator Theodor Christian Faaborg (1864–1934). The marriage was dissolved in 1909.

She was raised in the Adelgade district of Copenhagen where she developed sharp communication skills in the local dialect which she later applied to her journalism. Thanks to her strong singing voice, while still quite young she studied under the musician Carl Helsted who had developed pedagogical skills in Germany. She later became a student of the Belgian soprano Désirée Artôt, first in Berlin, then in Paris.

== Career ==
It was thanks to Helsted that when 19 she was introduced to the Royal Opera where she made her debut as Philine in Mignon on 7 September 1887. Although she performed well, it was to be her only performance as the theatre already had enough competent sopranos. She therefore had to find other opportunities.

Over the next ten years, she appeared in recitals and operas in Germany. She performed some 40 different roles, in particular at the Berlin Royal Opera, the Court Opera in Munich and the Nuremberg Opera. These included many coloratura roles such as Gilda in Giuseppe Verdi's Rigoletto and Marie in Gaetano Donizetti's La fille du régiment. On returning to Denmark, she appeared in concerts in Copenhagen and the provinces, culminating at the Glass Hall in Tivoli Gardens during the 1902 summer season.

Thereafter she turned to writing, contributing articles to newspapers and magazines on a variety of subjects, ultimately becoming a respected music critic. In parallel, together with the actress Anna Ingwersen-Grebe and the ballet dancer Agnes Nyrop, she established Copenhagen's Drama Conservatory (Dramatiske Konservatorium) designed to introduce aspiring young people to the stage. But she then decided to devote her teaching talents to drama and voice lessons for talented soloists. At times, she trained up to 40 students, including the concert singer Vibeke Edmund and Liva Weel.

After leaving her second husband, Quiding lived with her mother in a former hospital on Copenhagen's Amaliegade, creating what she called a Singer Factory (Singerinde Fabrik) in two large rooms which had once housed patients. She also used the site for her extensive collection of pets, including cats, dogs, birds, a monkey and even a rat. In 1922, she moved into a large villa on Rosenvængets Allé in the Østerbro District where she could both teach and look after her pets. In later years, she continued to write and also became known for her radio broadcasts.

Hedevig Quiding died in Copenhagen on 22 October 1936. Her legacy, the foundation Hedevig Quidings Legat, is still able to provide support for those who share her interests in animal protection, singing, acting and the theatre.
