= Lucky Journey =

1947 film

- Film poster
- Directed by: Christen Jul
- Written by: Kirstine Andersen; Christen Jul
- Produced by: Tage Nielsen
- Starring: Erling Schroeder
- Cinematography: Einar Olsen
- Edited by: Edith Schlüssel
- Release date: 1947
- Running time: 71 minutes
- Country: Denmark
- Language: Danish

Lucky Journey (Danish: Lykke på rejsen) is a 1947 Danish family film directed by Christen Jul. It tells the story of a young nobleman who is in an unhappy marriage with his beautiful but superficial and selfish wife.

== Cast ==
- Erling Schroeder - Grev Klaus Segeberg
- Ingeborg Brams - Dagny, Klaus' kone
- Asbjørn Andersen - Godsejer Joachim Fries-Olsen
- Peter Malberg - Grev Mathias Broholt
- Maria Garland - Priorinde Heralda Broholt
- Else Kourani - Betty van Holten
- Ellen Margrethe Stein - Franziska Bergen, komtesse
- Vera Lindstrøm - Mathilda
- Valborg Neuchs - Julie
- Karl Jørgensen - Provst Bramminge
- Olaf Ussing - Gaston Caillard
- Karen Berg - Rasmussen, husholderske hos Fries-Olsen
- Grete Bendix
- Paul Holck-Hofmann
- Ego Brønnum-Jacobsen - Jespersen, apoteker
- Per Buckhøj - Turist på hotel
- Valsø Holm - Dansk turist i Paris
- Elga Olga Svendsen - Dansk turist i Paris
- Dirch Passer - Statist (uncredited)
