= Ingeborg Brams =

Danish actress (1921–1989)

- Born: 9 December 1921; Hobro, Denmark
- Died: 14 October 1989 (aged 67); Denmark
- Occupation(s): Actress and speaker
- Years active: 1941–1988

Ingeborg Brams (Danish pronunciation: [ˈe̝ŋəˌpɒˀ ˈpʁɑmˀs]; 9 December 1921 – 14 October 1989) was a Danish film, radio, television and theatre actress. She was born in Hobro, Denmark and died in Denmark. She appeared in 11 films between 1941 and 1957 plus several TV and radio plays, perhaps best remembered as a revered theater actress with a long connection to the Royal Danish Theatre lasting 18 years and countless performances to her credit. In the early 1960s she would start to develop a growing severe stage fright then spent the last twenty years of her life mainly with public book readings, in churches and theatres as well as more radio work. Her step-granddaughter is the Danish recorder player Michala Petri.

== Selected filmography ==
- My Dear Wives (1943)
- The Bishop (1944)
- October Roses (1946)
- Lucky Journey (1947)
- Café Paradise (1950)
- Angel in Black (1957)
