= Alf Schnéevoigt =

Danish photographer (1915–1982)

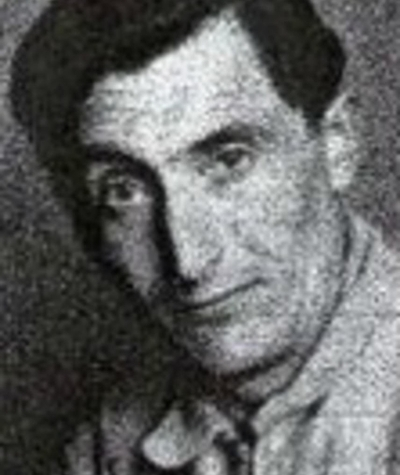
Alf Schnéevoigt ca. 1940

Alf Schnéevoigt (25 December 1915 – 22 April 1982) was a Danish photographer born to George Schnéevoigt and Henriette Mathilde Frederiksen. At the beginning of World War II Schnéevoigt worked as a film photographer at ASA. He was subsequently with Frikorps Danmark on the eastern front and photographed for Die Deutsche Wochenschau.

Schnéevoigt was arrested on 6 May 1945 at his residence for the murders of Jørgen Buntzen and Hipoen Herskov. On November 14, 1946, he was found guilty and sentenced to death. However, in 1947, his sentence was changed to life in prison. After 10 years in prison he was released.

== Filmography ==
- Moster fra Mols (1943)
- Afsporet (1942)
- Frøken Vildkat (1942)
- Frøken Kirkemus (1941)
- Tag til Rønneby Kro (1941)
- Far skal giftes (1941)
- Tror du jeg er født i Gaar! (1941)
- En ganske almindelig Pige (1940)
