= Nu går den på Dagmar =

1972 film

- Poster by Peter Pagh
- Directed by: Henning Ørnbak
- Written by: Henning Ørnbak
- Produced by: Klaus Pagh
- Cinematography: Peter Klitgaard
- Edited by: Maj Soya
- Music by: Palle Mikkelborg
- Distributed by: ASA Filmudlejning
- Release date: 23 October 1972
- Running time: 95 minutes
- Country: Denmark
- Language: Danish

Nu går den på Dagmar is a Danish 1972 film written and directed by Henning Ørnbak.

== Cast ==
- Helle Merete Sørensen
- Finn Storgaard
- Claus Ryskjær
- Ulla Gottlieb
- Klaus Pagh
- Erling Schroeder
- Jørgen Ryg
- Flemming Quist Møller
- Gabriel Axel
- Lily Broberg
- Judy Gringer
- Willy Rathnov
- Preben Mahrt
- Ove Sprogøe
- Sisse Reingaard
