= Henrik Malberg =

Danish actor (1873–1958)

- Born: Henrik Martin Marinus Malberg; 4 December 1873; Aarhus, Denmark
- Died: 28 September 1958 (aged 84)
- Years active: 1896–1958

Henrik Malberg (1873–1958) was a Danish actor of theater and Danish cinema who played his most noted role at the age of 80—the stoic authoritative farm owner in the Carl Theodor Dreyer classic film Ordet.

== Career ==
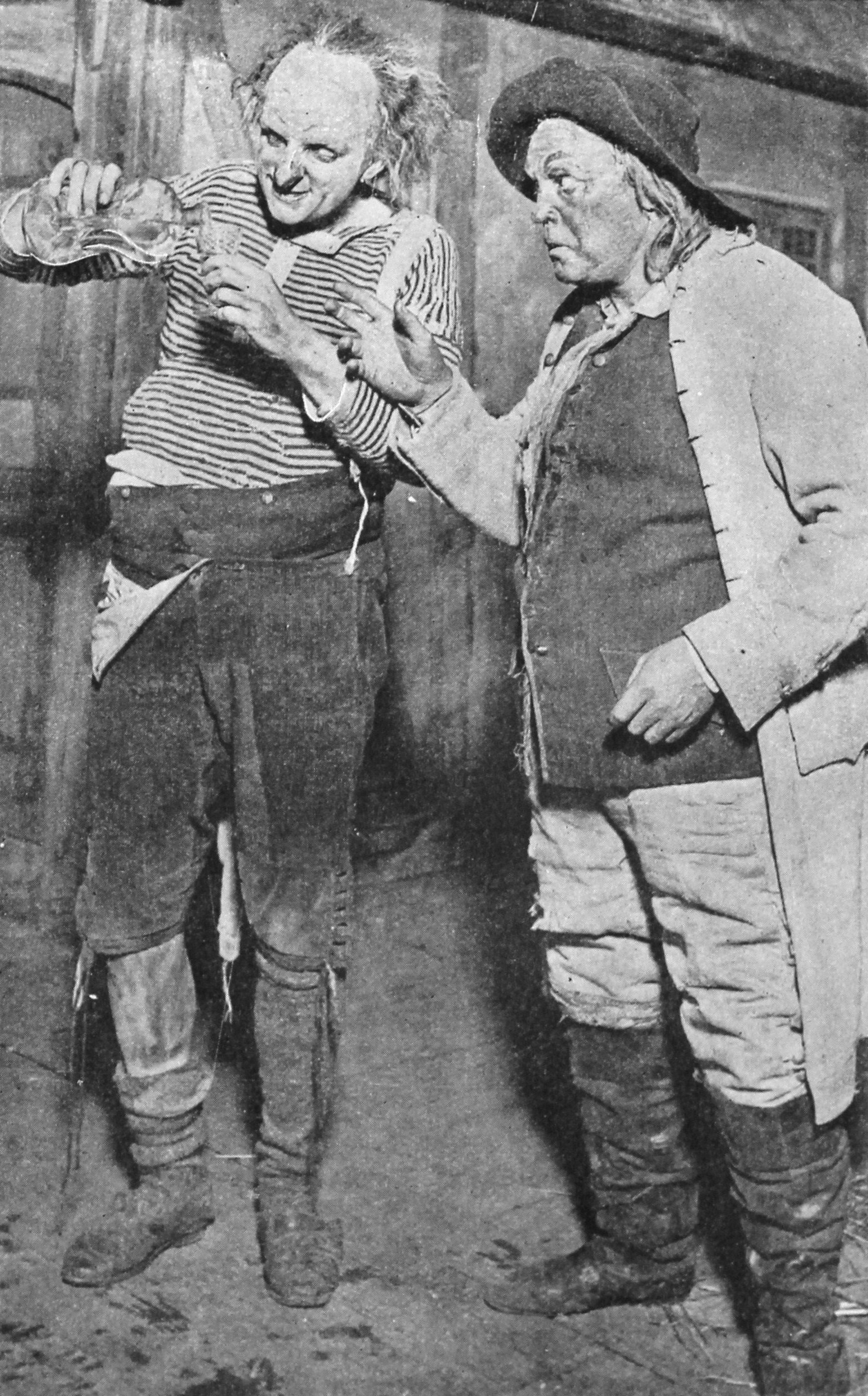
Henrik Malberg (right) as Jeppe in Ludvig Holberg's Jeppe på bjerget at the Royal Theatre in Copenhagen, 1918. To the left is Valdemar Møller as Jacob Shoemaker.

Henrik Martin Marinus Malberg was born in Aarhus Denmark on 4 December 1873. Originally trained as a mechanic, Malberg made his stage debut at the Århus Teater in 1896. Malberg worked with a touring company for several years but between 1902 and 1905 he was based with the Aarhus Theater. While playing the role of Arv in Masquerade, Malberg was noticed by the Danish actor Olaf Poulsen who brought him to Copenhagen. For the next five years, Malberg was the principal actor at the Dagmar Theater in Copenhagen. In 1910, he became director for a Danish touring company, then once again returned to the Dagmar (1912–1914) and afterwards, the Alexander Theater (1914–1917). In his later years, Malberg was employed at the Royal Danish Theatre in Copenhagen.

Malberg made his screen debut in the 1910 silent film, The Picture of Dorian Gray. He appeared in several more films during the silent era for the major Danish directors of the period: George Schnéevoigt, Emanuel Gregers, Holger-Madsen and Lau Lauritzen, Sr. He also performed in three Fy & Bi comedies. Then in 1930, Malberg performed the lead role in the first purely Danish sound film as the priest in the crime mystery Præsten i Vejlby. A man of large stature and booming voice, Malberg was primarily a stage performer, and his film performances are described as imposing and theatrical. It was not until he was 80 years old that Malberg played his most memorable role—as the farm owner Morten Borgen in the classic Carl Th. Dreyer film Ordet (The Word). Malberg credited Dreyer with teaching him the art of film acting.

When for so many years one stood on a large stage, a huge square, and shouted lines over the audience, one must learn to tone it down and find a quieter form in front of the camera. Dreyer taught me that. He is a magnificent director - he demands a lot, but also gives a lot.

— Henrik Malberg at age 80, Ekstra Bladet 1954

Afterward Malberg travelled around Denmark to teach and to perform for school children. At the age of 84, he toured 55 Copenhagen area schools and a dozen in Jutland, giving a two-hour performance at each.

I am actually in such good shape, that I dream of performing on stage for my 85th birthday.

— Henrik Malberg, Politiken, 1958

Malberg died at age 84 after falling from a ladder. During his long career, Malberg appeared in 21 films. Malberg also cowrote two stage plays: Bolettes Brudefærd (with Orla Bock) and Gamle Postgaard (with Axel Frische). Malberg performed in the 1938 movie version of Bolettes Brudefærd with his brother Peter Malberg and Bodil Ipsen. Malberg was an honorary member of the Danish Actor's Union for which he sat on the board for 36 years.

== Personal life ==
Malberg was the son of Peter Broch Malberg and Catrine Marie Schebye. His brother, Peter Malberg, was also an actor. Malberg married Anna Augusta Hansenmeyer on 11 May 1906. Malberg died on 28 September 1958. The address in Aarhus where Malberg was born houses a dinner theater.

== Filmography ==
Year	Original title	English title	Role	Notes
1955	Ordet	The Word	Morten Borgen	directed by Carl Th. Dreyer
1942	Med forenede kræfter			Propaganda film
1938	Bolettes brudefærd		Carpenter Kristiansen	based on Malberg's play
1938	Kongen bød		Jeppe	
1937	Kloge Mand, Den	The Clever Man	Shoemaker	
1936	Sol over Danmark	Sun Over Denmark	Pastor Nicolaj Jacobsen	
1933	Kobberbryllup		Handelsgartner Johansen	
1932	Paustians Uhr	Paustian's Clock	Mayor	
1931	Præsten i Vejlby	The Vicar of Vejlby	Præsten Søren Quist	First Danish sound film
1930	Hr. Tell og søn	William Tell and Son	Uncle Jokum	Fy & Bi Film
1929	Højt paa en Kvist			Fy & Bi Film
1925	Grønkøbings glade gavtyve	Pat and Patachon are Millionaires	Bank director	Fy & Bi Film
1924	Der Mann um Mitternacht	The Man at Midnight	Knut Hammerdal	
1921	Det Største i Verden	Love that Lives	Thomas Ward	directed by Holger-Madsen
1920	Gudernes yndling	The Penalty of Fame	Pommel	
1919	Krigsmillionæren	The Parvenu	Jensen	directed by Emanuel Gregers
1916	Udenfor loven	Outside the Law	Brown	
1914	Tre indvendige Jomfruer	Three Maidens		
1914	Lejla	Lejla	Horse trainer	
1913	Lille Klaus og store Klaus		Lille Klaus	
1910	Dorian Grays Portræt	The Picture of Dorian Gray		
