= Skal vi vædde en million? =

1932 film

- Poster
- Directed by: George Schnéevoigt
- Written by: Fleming Lynge; Paul Sarauw
- Starring: Frederik Jensen; Marguerite Viby
- Cinematography: Valdemar Christensen
- Edited by: Valdemar Christensen; Carl H. Petersen
- Music by: Kai Normann Andersen
- Distributed by: Nordisk Tonefilm
- Release date: 1 March 1932
- Running time: 88 minutes
- Country: Denmark
- Language: Danish language

Skal vi vædde en million? is a 1932 Danish romantic drama film directed by George Schnéevoigt, and written by frequent collaborators Fleming Lynge and Paul Sarauw. The film stars Frederik Jensen and marked the film debut of Marguerite Viby.

== Cast ==
- Frederik Jensen ... Generalkonsul Godtfred Winterfeldt
- Marguerite Viby ... Korpigen Aurora
- Hans Kurt ... Jørgen Winterfeldt
- Lili Lani ... Elly Martin
- Hans W. Petersen ... Komponist J. Jansøe
- Mathilde Nielsen ... Frk. Mortensen
