= Valdemar Møller =

Danish actor and film director

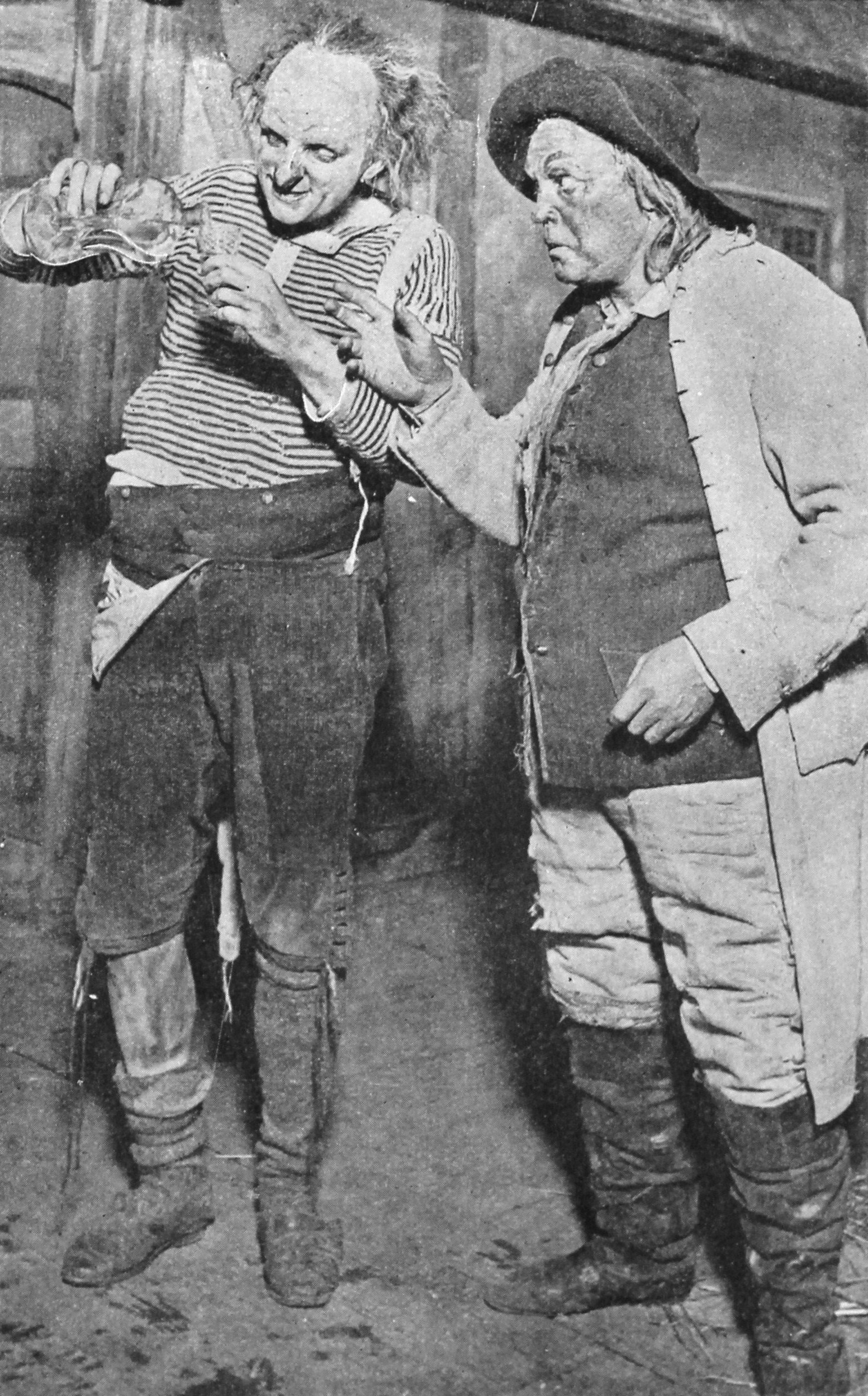
- Møller (left) with Henrik Malberg during the play Jeppe på bjerget in 1918
- Born: Hans Valdemar Møller; 19 January 1885; Copenhagen, Denmark
- Died: 16 February 1947 (aged 62)

Valdemar Møller (19 January 1885 – 16 February 1947) was a Danish actor and film director.

He starred at the Royal Danish Theatre between 1903–1905 and appeared in several silent films in the early 1910s. However, he only actively featured in films from the late 1930s. Møller was the brother of Danish actress Petrine Sonne.

== Selected filmography ==
- Balletdanserinden – 1911
- Tango – 1933
- Champagnegaloppen – 1938
- Kongen bød – 1938
- Cirkus – 1939
- Sørensen og Rasmussen – 1940
- Alle går rundt og forelsker sig – 1941
- En søndag på Amager – 1941
- Tag til Rønneby Kro – 1941
- Thummelumsen – 1941
- Alle mand på dæk – 1942
- Tordenskjold går i land – 1942
- Forellen – 1942
- Alt for karrieren – 1943
- Drama på slottet – 1943
- Når man kun er ung – 1943
- De tre skolekammerater – 1944
- Spurve under taget – 1944
- To som elsker hinanden – 1944
