= De blaa drenge =

1933 film

- Poster
- Directed by: George Schnéevoigt
- Written by: Fleming Lynge
- Starring: Liva Weel
- Cinematography: Valdemar Christensen
- Edited by: Valdemar Christensen; Carl H. Petersen
- Music by: Kai Normann Andersen
- Distributed by: Nordisk Tonefilm
- Release date: 15 August 1933
- Running time: 101 minutes
- Country: Denmark
- Language: Danish

De blaa drenge (The Blue Boys) is a 1933 Danish family film classic directed by George Schnéevoigt and written by frequent collaborator Fleming Lynge with the score by Kai Normann Andersen. The film stars performer Liva Weel.

== Cast ==
- Liva Weel as Frk. Sylvia Grøn
- Robert Schmidt as Rektor Elmquist
- Schiøler Linck as Religionslærer Zimmermann
- Mathilde Nielsen as Frk. Osterhammel
- Sigfred Johansen as Lærer Henrik Brandt
- Elith Foss as Adjunkt Møller
- Henry Christoffersen as Fysiklærer Meincke
- Harald Holst as Gormsen
- Petrine Sonne as Pige hos frk. Grøn
- Paul Hofman as Regissør Hannibal
- Henry Nielsen as Pedel på skolen
- Johannes Meyer as Oberst Barsøe
- Nina Kalckar as Ragna Barsøe
- Karen Lykkehus as Eva Kristoffersen
- Knud Heglund as Skuespiller Engel
- Svend Bille as Skuespiller Herman Sander
- Helga Frier as Skuespiller Lya Swanson
- Ib Schønberg as Oberstens oppasser
- Buster Larsen as Uartig skoledreng
