= Fleming Lynge =

Danish screenwriter (1896-1970)

- Born: 20 September 1896; Frederiksberg, Denmark
- Died: 3 November 1970 (aged 74); Denmark
- Occupation: Screenwriter
- Years active: 1929–1959

Fleming Lynge (20 September 1896 – 3 November 1970) was a Danish screenwriter. He wrote for more than 70 films between 1929 and 1959. He was born and died in Denmark.

== Selected filmography ==
- Vi arme syndere (1952)
- Besættelse (1944)
- Melody of Murder (1944)
- Jeg har elsket og levet (1940)
- Familien Olsen (1940)
- Circus (1939)
- Life on the Hegn Farm (1938)
- Champagnegaloppen (1938)
- 65, 66 and I (1936)
- Prisoner Number One (1935)
- Nøddebo Præstegård (1934)
- De blaa drenge (1933)
- Lalla vinner! (1932)
- Odds 777 (1932)
- Skal vi vædde en million? (1932)
- Hotel Paradis (1931)
- Præsten i Vejlby (1931)
