= Bag Københavns kulisser =

1935 film

- Poster
- Directed by: Arne Weel
- Written by: Arne Weel
- Produced by: Arne Weel
- Starring: Ib Schønberg
- Cinematography: Carlo Bentsen
- Edited by: Winnie Nielsen
- Music by: Peter Deutsch; Erik Fiehn
- Release date: 19 August 1935
- Country: Denmark
- Language: Danish language

Bag Kobenhavn's kulisser is a 1935 Danish film directed and written by Arne Weel.

== Plot ==
The little theater lady Eva comes out of a minor accident when her taxi collides with a private car belonging to the wealthy banker Morgan. And out of this otherwise ordinary accident occurs unsuspected complications. Eva dismissed when she is late for the theater sample, and the banker will get nothing about the accident. But when he gets wind of it, he might be persuaded to put money in the crowded theater and save the situation.

== Cast ==
- Sam Besekow
- Else-Marie
- Karl Goos
- Arthur Jensen
- Sigfred Johansen
- Sigurd Langberg
- Osa Massen
- Clara Østø
- Henrik Rechendorff
- Ib Schønberg
- Olga Svendsen
- Bruno Tyron
- Erika Voigt
- Arne Weel
