= Hotel Paradis =

1931 film

- Poster
- Directed by: George Schnéevoigt
- Written by: Fleming Lynge; Einar Rousthøj (novel)
- Produced by: Eric A. Pettersson
- Starring: Eyvind Johan-Svendsen; Inger Stender
- Cinematography: Valdemar Christensen
- Edited by: Valdemar Christensen
- Music by: Kai Normann Andersen
- Distributed by: Nordisk Tonefilm
- Release date: October 1931
- Running time: 102 minutes
- Country: Denmark
- Language: Danish language

Hotel Paradis is a 1931 Danish drama directed by George Schnéevoigt. The film, based on a novel by Einar Rousthøj, stars Eyvind Johan-Svendsen and Inger Stender. The film was also known as Hotel Paradisets hemlighed (The Secret of the Paradise Hotel).

== Cast ==
- Eyvind Johan-Svendsen as Heinrich Schultz/Bremer
- Karen Caspersen as Emilie Schultz/Bremer
- Kirsten Møller as Rosa Schultz som barn
- Inger Stender as Rosa Schultz som voksen
- Holger Reenberg as Mølleren
- Jon Iversen as Præsten
- Svend Melsing as Skibsofficerens søn
- Elith Pio as Fridolin
- Karen Poulsen as Tosse-Grete
- Robert Schmidt as Skarpretter
- Ragnar Arvedson as Henemann
- Anna-Lisa Baude as Tok-Greta
- John Ekman as Henrik Schultze
- Gösta Gustafson as Fridolin
- Gun Holmqvist as Rosa
- Knut Jarlow as Lt. von Kraków
- Gunnel Lindgren as Young Rosa
- Ester Roeck-Hansen as Emilie
- Harry Roeck-Hansen as Kleinsorg
