= Siri Schnéevoigt =

Danish photographer and actress (1870–1946)

Siri Alina Schnéevoigt (1870–1946) was a photographer and actress, born in Finland, but active in Denmark. She was the mother to director George Schnéevoigt, and sister to conductor Georg Schnéevoigt.

In early 1900's Schnéevoigt and her husband Hermann Friedrich Fischer divorced, which later resulted in her changing her last name from Fischer-Schnéevoigt back to her maiden name Schnéevoigt. As a photographer she was known as Siri Fischer-Schnéevoigt.

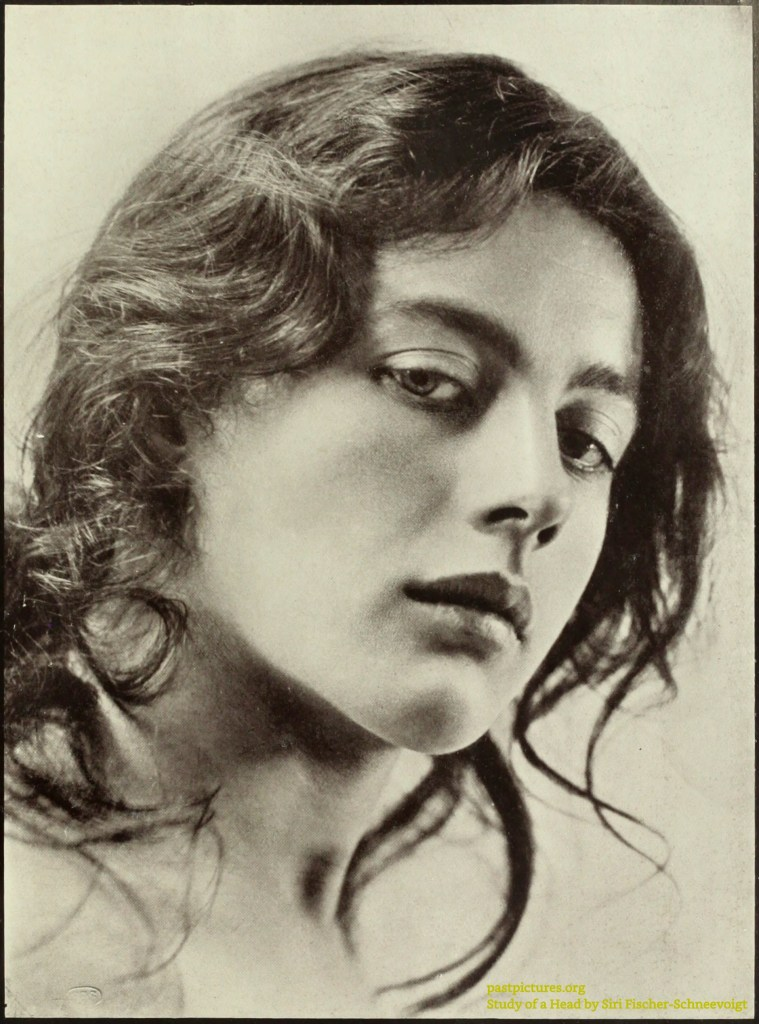
Study of a Head, 1906, by Siri Fischer-Schneevoigt

She moved from Copenhagen to Berlin with her sons and started her own studio before 1907. She is known of her portraits of famous dancers and musicians, but also of ordinary studio portraits and art photographs. She was active among the Pictorial photographers. Her photographs were published regularly in International and Central European photography magazines and publications along with for example Gertrude Käsebier, Alfred Stieglitz and Robert Demachy.

== Filmography ==
- Laila (1937)
