= Hans Kurt =

Danish actor (1909–1968)

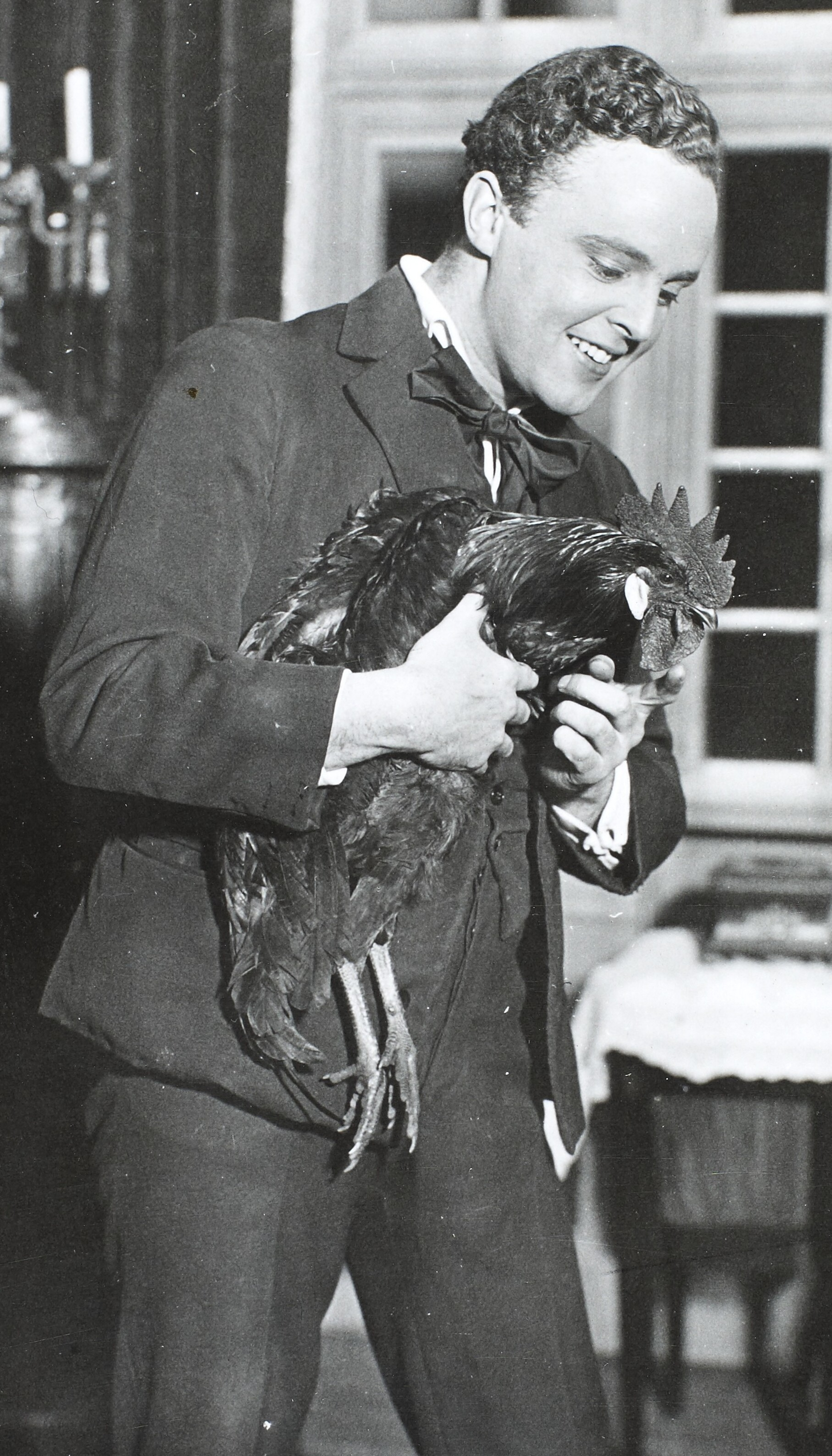
- Kurt in the play Nøddebo Præstegaard
- Born: 23 February 1909; Denmark
- Died: 19 October 1968 (aged 59)

Hans Kurt (23 February 1909 – 19 October 1968) was a Danish stage and film actor.

== Filmography ==
- Skal vi vædde en million? (Do You Want to Bet a Million?) – 1932
- Nøddebo Præstegård – 1934
- Jeg har elsket og levet – 1940
- Alle går rundt og forelsker sig – 1941
- En søndag på Amager – 1941
- Thummelumsen – 1941
- Alle mand på dæk – 1942
- Tordenskjold går i land – 1942
- Teatertosset – 1944
- Man elsker kun een gang – 1945
- Røverne fra Rold – 1947
- I de lyse nætter – 1948
- Mød mig på Cassiopeia – 1951
- This Is Life (1953)
- Karen, Maren og Mette – 1954
- Himlen er blå – 1954
- Vi som går stjernevejen – 1956
- Hvad vil De ha'? – 1956
- Ingen tid til kærtegn – 1957
- Amor i telefonen – 1957
- Kvindelist og kærlighed – 1960
- Sømand i knibe – 1960
- Gøngehøvdingen – 1961
- Duellen – 1962
- Frk. Nitouche – 1963
- Hvis lille pige er du? – 1963
- Landmandsliv – 1965
