= Eyvind Johan-Svendsen =

Danish actor (1896–1946)

- Born: 5 January 1896; Copenhagen Denmark
- Died: 10 October 1946 (aged 50); Copenhagen Denmark

Eyvind Johan-Svendsen (5 January 1896 – 10 October 1946) was a Danish stage and film actor.

== Biography ==
He worked in Danish theatre between 1917 and 1939 and appeared at the Det Kongelige Teater (the Royal Danish Theatre) in Copenhagen from 1926 to 1939. He starred in his first film, the religious film Præsten i Vejlby, in 1931.

Eyvind Johan-Svendsen's father was the Norwegian composer and conductor Johan Svendsen, who was principal conductor at the Det Kongelige Teater from 1883 to 1908, and his mother was Juliette Haase.

== Selected filmography ==
- Grønkøbings glade gavtyve (1925)
- Præsten i Vejlby (1931)
- Hotel Paradis (1931)
- 7-9-13 (1934)
- Tyrannens fald (1942)
- Møllen (1943)
- Det brændende spørgsmål (1943)
- Otte akkorder (1944)
- Brevet fra afdøde (1946)

== See also ==
- Johan Svendsen
