= Sun over Denmark =

1936 film

- Directed by: Holger-Madsen
- Written by: John Olsen; Hans Hartvig Seedorff
- Starring: Henrik Malberg; Albrecht Schmidt; Sigrid Horne-Rasmussen
- Cinematography: Marius Holdt; Carl Maagaard-Christensen; H.F. Rimmen
- Music by: Erik Fiehn; Emil Reesen
- Production company: Teatrenes Films-Kontor
- Release date: 24 August 1936
- Running time: 92 minutes
- Country: Denmark
- Language: Danish

Sun over Denmark (Danish: Sol over Danmark) is a 1936 Danish comedy film directed by Holger-Madsen and starring Henrik Malberg, Albrecht Schmidt and Sigrid Horne-Rasmussen. While crossing Denmark on holiday, two boys and two girls keep encountering each other. The film was remade in Sweden as Sun Over Sweden in 1938.

== Cast ==
- Henrik Malberg as Pastor Nicolaj Jacobsen
- Maria Grünwald-Bertelsen as Margrethe Jacobsen
- Albrecht Schmidt as Fiskeeksportør Hans Jacobsen
- Sigrid Horne-Rasmussen as Anna Jensen
- Astrid Neumann as Fru Winge
- Knud Rex as Poul Jacobsen
- Bent Bentzen as Jørgen Juhl
- Agnete Arne-Jensen as Fru Petersen
- Grethe Sjölin as Ebba Petersen
- Gerda Neumann as Kirsten Winge
- Bruno Tyron as Chauffør Lars Christian Jensen
- Else Würtz as Tjenestepigen Marie
- Aage Redal as Politibetjent
- Henry Skjær as Operasanger

== Bibliography ==
- Conrich, Ian. Film's Musical Moments. Edinburgh University Press, 2006.
