= Champagnegaloppen =

- DVD
- Directed by: George Schnéevoigt
- Written by: Hans Christian Lumbye (musical); Paul Holck-Hofmann (play); Fleming Lynge (writer)
- Starring: Svend Methling; Valdemar Møller; Agnes Rehni
- Cinematography: Valdemar Christensen
- Edited by: Valdemar Christensen; Carl H. Petersen
- Music by: Viggo Barfoed; Alfred Kjerulf
- Distributed by: Nordisk Film
- Release date: 1 August 1938
- Running time: 93 minutes
- Country: Denmark
- Language: Danish

Champagnegaloppen is a 1938 Danish musical film directed by George Schnéevoigt. The film based on a musical by Hans Christian Lumbye and play by Paul Holck-Hofmann and stars Svend Methling and Valdemar Møller. It is named after the light classical piece composed by Hans Christian Lumbye, who is a character in the film.

== Cast ==
- Svend Methling as H.C. Lumbye
- Valdemar Møller as Tobias Hambroe
- Agnes Rehni as Abelone Hambroe
- Annie Jessen as Amelie Hambroe
- Marius Jacobsen as Musiker Jens Werning
- Victor Montell as Musiker Køster
- John Price as Musiker Lindemann
- Johannes Poulsen as Koncertmester Salomon Bierbaum
- Eigil Reimers as Baron von Listow
- Torkil Lauritzen. as Løjtnant Seefeld
- Gunnar Helsengreenas Opvartersken Lene
- Else Højgaard as Danserinden Arabella
- Helga Frier as Frk. Züberlein
