= The Rector of Veilbye =

1829 novel by Steen Steensen Blicher

- Author: Steen Steensen Blicher
- Original title: Præsten i Vejlbye
- Language: English, Danish
- Genre: Crime; Mystery
- Publication date: 1829
- Publication place: Denmark
- Media type: Print
- Pages: ca. 20

The Rector of Veilbye (Danish: Præsten i Vejlbye) is a crime mystery written in 1829 by the Danish author Steen Steensen Blicher. The novella is based upon a true murder case from 1626 in the village of Vejlby near Grenå, Denmark. It is considered a forerunner to the crime story and detective fiction genre, and was a pioneering use of the unreliable narrator. Blicher's tragic tale has been adapted for the screen three times by Danish filmmakers.

In 2006, The Rector of Veilbye was included in the Cultural Canon of Denmark by the Danish Ministry of Culture. The ministry noted that "the style illuminates elegiac pain and discomfort in an eerily intense drama, and the story is difficult to shake off". Danish literary historian Søren Baggesen stated "Blicher is not just the first of Danish literature's great storytellers, he is one of the few tragic poets Danish literature has ever had."

== Synopsis ==
The story is told in the form of diary entries by Erik Sørensen, the judge and sheriff of the community of Vejlby. He writes about Søren Qvist, a village rector with a short temper, who is accused of murdering his unlikeable servant, Niels Bruus, when Bruus disappears after a violent argument. Sørensen is forced to investigate by Bruus's brother, but he does so reluctantly because he is engaged to marry the rector's daughter, Mette, in three weeks. Sørensen wants nothing more than to clear Qvist's good name and marry Mette. However, the judge becomes distraught when more and more witnesses offer indisputable evidence against the Rector Qvist. The rector, although he doesn't remember any murder, believes the evidence is undeniable, decides he must have committed murder and confesses—condemning himself to death. The judge is forced to pass sentence—the rector is beheaded—and Judge Sørensen's relationship with Mette, the woman he loves, becomes forever impossible. Mette leaves town and Sørensen is condemned to spend the rest of his life alone.

The story shifts to the diary entries of the new rector of Vejlby. Twenty years have passed when a beggar visits the rector and reveals that he is Niels Bruus, the alleged murder victim. Bruus has returned to the village only after the death of his brother, who had concocted the cruel hoax as revenge against the minister for rejecting him as a suitor for his daughter. The rector decides to withhold the truth from Sørensen—that he had executed an innocent man. However, Bruus tells the judge his story, and Judge Sørensen collapses from a heart attack. The next day, Bruus is discovered dead, lying across the grave of the Rector Qvist.

== Historic background ==
The story was inspired by the trial of Pastor Søren Jensen Quist of Vejlby at Grenaa in 1626. The case revolved around the unexplained disappearance in 1607 of a farm laborer named Jesper Hovgaard who worked at Pastor Quist's rectory. Fifteen years later, in 1622, human bones were uncovered beside the rectory. It was suspected these were Hovgaard's remains, and rumors mounted that the Reverend Quist had murdered him. At official proceedings against Quist at Kalø Castle, two local men, who had histories of animosity toward Quist, testified that they witnessed the pastor murder Hovgaard while in a drunken rage. Quist was found guilty and executed by decapitation on July 20, 1626. In 1634, Quist's son who had become the Pastor of Vejlby discovered that the witnesses had been bribed and they were executed for perjury in 1634. Blicher knew the story partly from Erik Pontoppidan's Danish Church History (1741), and partly through oral tradition.

== Composition ==
The complex structure of the novella is a forerunner to the crime story genre and was written several years before Edgar Allan Poe wrote his first detective fiction. It was also a pioneering use of the unreliable narrator device. The composition includes a crime, an investigative phase, a number of ambiguous clues, a conviction, and a surprising twist. Through use of a layered first-person narrative format, the story is first presented by a "confessional" diarist who recounts the sequence of events. The final part of the story is then told, several years later, to reveal the truth. The reader discovers the diarist has been an unreliable narrator whose insight is limited by their own religious perceptions. A tension is created between a "crime story" and a true story, and "blurs the boundaries between reality and fiction."

== Adaptations ==
- Praesten i Vejlby (1922 film); - a silent film directed by August Blom. Considered the most faithful to the original story.
- Praesten i Vejlby (1931 film) - directed by George Schnéevoigt. Considered to be Denmark's first sound film.
- Praesten i Vejlby (1972 film) - directed by Claus Ørsted.

== See also ==
- Tom Sawyer, Detective
