= Schiøler Linck =

Danish actor (1878–1952)

- Born: Valdemar Schiøler Linck; 26 October 1878; Copenhagen, Denmark
- Died: 6 September 1952 (aged 73); Frederiksberg, Denmark
- Years active: 1897-1946

Schiøler Linck, born Valdemar Schiøler Linck (26 October 1878 – 6 September 1952), was a Danish stage and film actor.

He debuted in the Faaborg Teater in 1897, and, in 1932, starred in the film Odds 777, followed by De blaa drenge in 1933.

== Filmography ==
- Der var engang (1922)
- Buridan, le héros de la Tour de Nesle (1924)
- Den sørgmuntre barber (1927)
- Sikke tider (1929)
- Sikke en nat (1929)
- Begravelsesherrerne (1931)
- Odds 777 (1932)
- De blaa drenge (1933)
- Så til søs (1933)
- Nyhavn 17 (1933)
- Den ny husassistent (1933)
- Nøddebo Præstegård (1934)
- Sjette trækning (1936)
- Bolettes brudefærd (1938)
- Ballade i Nyhavn (1942)
- Det kære København (1944)
- Far betaler (1946)
