= Albrecht Schmidt (actor) =

Danish actor

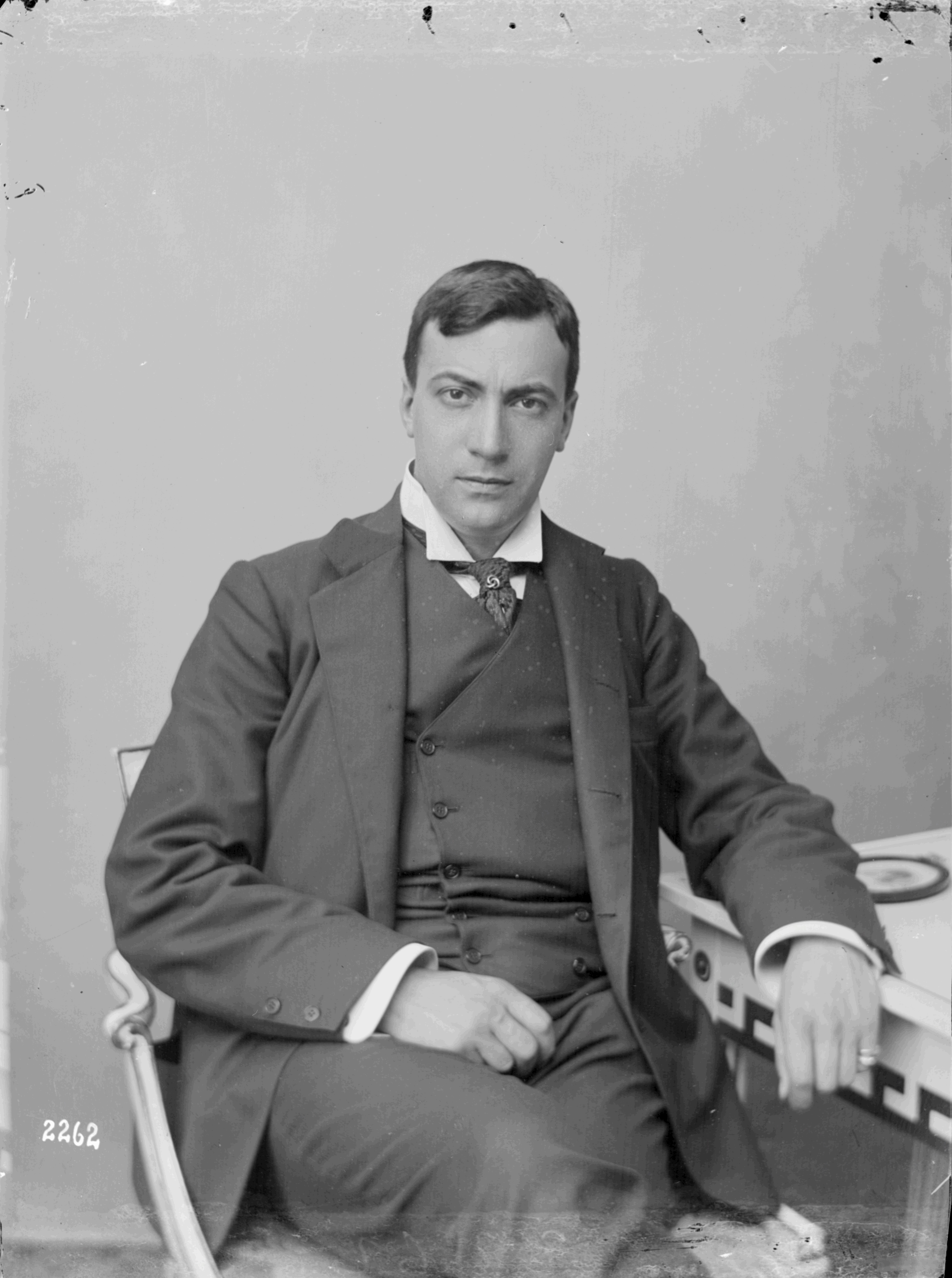
- by Peter Elfelt
- Born: 9 April 1870; Copenhagen, Denmark
- Died: 5 March 1945 (aged 74)
- Occupation: Actor
- Years active: 1911–1941

Albrecht Schmidt (9 April 1870 – 5 March 1945) was a Danish film actor. He appeared in 13 films between 1911 and 1941. He was born in Copenhagen, Denmark.

== Filmography ==
- Skæbnebæltet (1911)
- Morfinisten (1911)
- Atlantis (1913)
- Klostret i Sendomir (1920)
- Häxan (1922)
- 5 raske piger (1933)
- Flight from the Millions (1934)
- Sun Over Denmark (1936)
- En fuldendt gentleman (1937)
- Den kloge Mand (1937)
- Kongen bød (1938)
- Sommerglæder (1940)
- Niels Pind og hans dreng (1941)
