= Steen Steensen Blicher =

Danish writer (1782–1848)

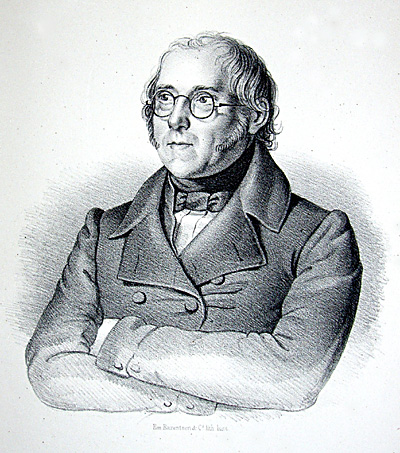
Steen Steensen Blicher

Steen Steensen Blicher (11 October 1782 in Vium – 26 March 1848 in Spentrup) was a writer and poet born in Vium near Viborg, Denmark.

== Biography ==
Blicher was the son of a literarily inclined Jutlandic parson whose family was distantly related to Martin Luther.

He grew up in close contact with nature and peasant life in the moor areas of central Jutland. After trying his hand as a teacher and a tenant farmer, he at last became a parson like his father and from 1825 to 1847 served in the parish of Spentrup.

As a clergyman, Blicher is said to have been less than inspired. His main interests were hunting and writing. In 1842, he was accused of alcoholism and abandoned from a Cooperation of Danish writers. Many struggles with his superiors the following years led to his dismissal shortly before his death.

He had ten children, seven sons and three daughters, with his wife Ernestine Juliane Berg, whom he married on 11 June 1810.

== Significance as a writer ==
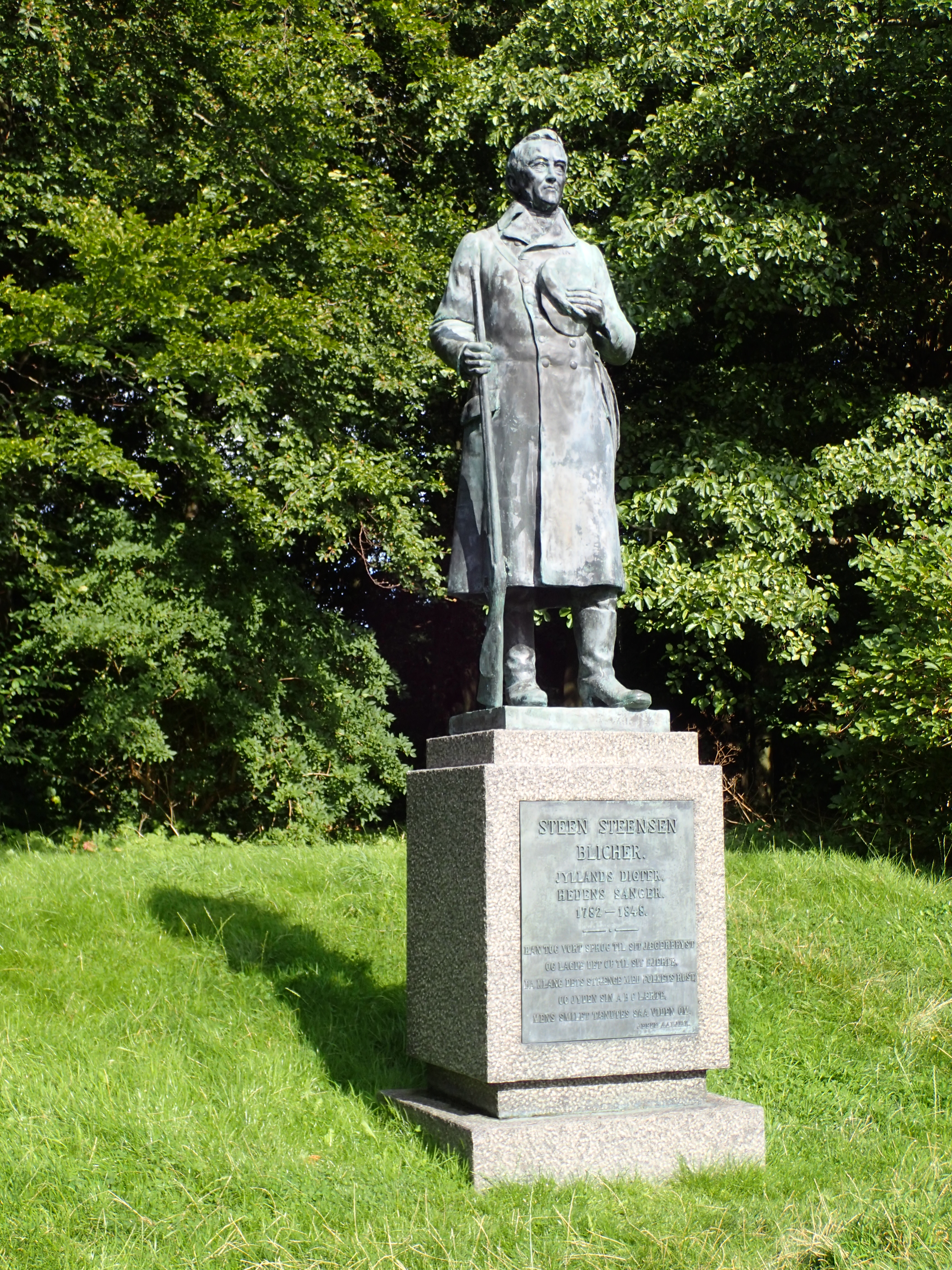
Bronze statue of Steen Steensen Blicher in Aarhus

=== Prose ===
Blicher is known as the pioneer of the short story in Danish. From the 1820s until his death he wrote several tales that were published in local periodicals (mostly dealing with his home region), as well as historical and amateur scientific sketches. Much of this work is entertainment but as many as twenty or thirty pieces have been called literary masterpieces.

In his prose, Blicher describes human fate in his home region in Jutland. Blicher is often called a tragic and melancholic writer, but he is not without wit and humour.

Blicher is one of the first novelists to make significant use of the unreliable narrator theme in literature. Four notable examples are:

- The Diary of a Parish Clerk, his break-through story, tells of a poor peasant boy’s troubled life with unhappy love, war and exile. Years after the main plot occurred, he discovers that the woman he was in love with for years, ended up as a poor, pathetic alcoholic. He spent his old age in resignation and distrust.
- His sombre story The Hosier and his Daughter (twice filmed) that describes the mental breakdown of a girl because of unhappy love is a classic prose tragedy.
- The Parson of Veilbye, written in the first person, is the first Danish crime novel. The narrator makes fatal wrong conclusions resulting in a wrongful conviction. It too has been filmed.
- Tardy Awakening, a tragedy of adultery and suicide, is perhaps influenced by the fact, that he in 1828 found out that his wife had a love affair.

He had additional talents, too: E Bindstouw is a mixture of tales and poetry on the model of the Decameron, written in the Jutlandic dialect. Here he turns loose his humorous side.

Earlier reviews noted that Blicher’s literary skill lies in his descriptions of scenery, especially the Jutlandic moor landscape and its inhabitants: the long-suffering peasantry and “free” moor gypsies. Later some biographies pointed out his skills in describing tragedy and psychology.

Stylistically, Blicher alternates between his own detailed intellectual narrative style and the colloquial speech of peasants, squires and robbers.

=== Poetry ===
Blicher wrote poetry from the years of the Napoleonic Wars until his death. Among his most important poems are the melancholic Til Glæden (“To Joy”) from 1814, his interesting local patriotic song "Kærest du Fødeland" (Dearest You Birthland) that shows his love for his home region, and his impressive winter poem "Det er hvidt herude" (It is white out here), published in his notable poetry collection "Trækfuglene" (Birds of Passage) in 1838.

The whole collection "Trækfuglene" was inspired by a serious extended illness. In this uncharacteristic poetry work, he let a range of symbolic birds express his own personal situation.

The bluff and cheerful dialect poem Jyden han æ stærk å sej ("The Jutlander he is strong and tough") is from 1841.

Many of Blichers poems have been accompanied by melodies later on. Notable examples includes "Det er hvidt herude" often sung to a melody composed by Thomas Laub in 1914 and "Sig nærmer tiden, da jeg må væk" (The time approaches when I must go) sung to a melody composed by Oluf Ring in 1922, both from "Trækfuglene".

=== Political and social themes ===
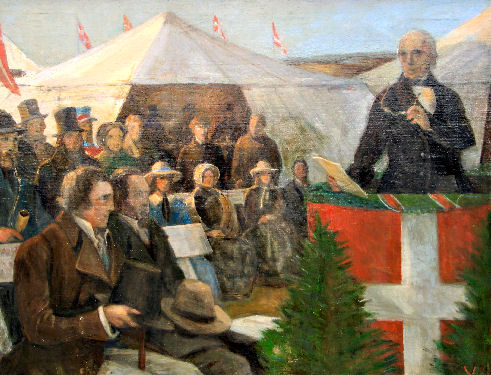
Steen Steensen Blicher speaking at a national feast at Himmelbjerget

Blicher was a man of far-ranging interests. Beginning as a conservative he developed into an eager critic of society, uniting the role of the enlightened citizen of the 18th century with modern liberalism. He tried to arrange national feasts in Jutland and proposed numerous laws and reforms, but he was never really accepted by the established liberal politicians.

Also something of an Anglophile, he translated British poetry, including Macpherson’s Ossian and novels such as Goldsmith’s The Vicar of Wakefield – once he even tried to write poetry in English.

Though being a member of the first Romanticist generation of Danish writers, Blicher is in many ways unique. He is more of a realist, dealing with broken dreams and with Time as man’s superior opponent. His religion is the old rationalist one.

He is a belated Danish pupil of the 18th century English epistolary style while, in his interest for dialect and peasants, he anticipates the regional writers who emerged around 1900, such as Johannes Vilhelm Jensen.

=== Present-day appreciation ===
Today Blicher is regarded as the pioneer of the Danish short story and regional writing. Many of his verses have been set to music and his best novels have been reprinted many times.

Steen Steensen Blicher never enjoyed international interest on the scale of Hans Christian Andersen or Karen Blixen, but in Denmark he is almost as well-known. In 2006, his novel Præsten i Vejlbye was adopted in the Danish Culture Canon, which means, officially one of the 10 Order of Merit novels in Danish literature of all time.

In Denmark, Blicher enjoyed fame and recognition in his own lifetime, and has been praised for his contributions to Danish culture ever since. In 1951, literary scholars initiated the Danish Blicher Society to "further and deepen the interest for Blichers life and writings", through various activities. They have awarded Blicherprisen (The Blicher Prize) annually since 1955 and the society is still active as of 2018.

== Works ==
- Brudstykker af en Landsbydegns Dagbog (1824, novella, "Diary of a Parish Clerk")
- Sneklokken (1825, poetry, "The Snow Bell")
- Røverstuen (1827, novella, "The Robber’s Den")
- Ak! hvor forandret (1828, novella, "Alas how changed")
- Sildig Opvaagnen (1828, novella, "Tardy Awakening")
- Præsten i Vejlby (1829, novella, The Rector of Veilbye)
- Kjeltringliv (1829, novella, "Gypsy Life")
- Telse (1829, novella)
- Hosekræmmeren (1829, novella, "The Hosier and his Daughter")
- Trækfuglene (1838, poetry, "Birds of Passage")
- De tre Helligaftener (1841 and 1846, novella, "Three Holliday Eves")
- E Bindstouw, Fortællinger og Digte i jydske Mundarter (1842, novella-poetry, dialect)

== Blicher's works in English ==
- The Diary of a Parish Clerk and Other Stories. Pref. by Erik Harbo, introd. by Margaret Drabble, transl. by Paula Hostrup-Jessen. Athlone Press (1996) ISBN 0-485-11500-X
- Tardy Awakening and Other Stories, ed. with afterword and comment. by Niels Ingwersen, transl. by Paula Brugge & Faith Ingwersen. University of Wisconsin (WITS II vol.#7, 1996).

== Sources ==
- Brix, Hans: "Steen Steensen Blicher", in The American Scandinavian Review Vol. 15. 1928, Number 10 October
- Baggesen, Søren: Den blicherske novelle, Odense Universitetsforlag 1965
- Sørensen, Knud: Steen Steensen Blicher. Digter og samfundsborger. En illustreret biografi. Cph. 1984.
- Aakjær, Jeppe: Steen Steensen Blichers Livs-Tragedie i Breve og Aktstykker, bind 1–2 (Nordisk Forlag 1904)
