= Odds 777 =

1932 film

- Poster
- Directed by: George Schnéevoigt
- Written by: Fleming Lynge; Paul Sarauw
- Starring: Liva Weel; Inger Stender
- Cinematography: Valdemar Christensen
- Edited by: Valdemar Christensen
- Music by: Kai Normann Andersen; Dan Folke
- Release date: 4 November 1932
- Running time: 91 minutes
- Country: Denmark
- Language: Danish

Odds 777 is a 1932 Danish musical family film directed by George Schnéevoigt. The film stars Liva Weel and Inger Stender.

== Plot ==
Kitchen maid Hansy Hansen wins a lottery prize. She uses her windfall to stay at a fancy seaside hotel, where she finds love in the person of godsejer (landowner) Rosen. Rosen needs money badly, so he places a large bet on a horse. When the jockey is bribed to pretend to be sick, Hansen takes his place and wins the race.

== Cast ==
- Liva Weel as Hansy Hansen
- Emanuel Gregers as Godsejer Rosen
- Inger Stender as Inga Rosen
- Angelo Bruun as Hans Berg
- Svend Bille as Overretssagfører Sadolin
- Schiøler Linck as Nicolaisen
- Axel Frische as Martin
- Helga Frier as Johanne
- Poul Reichhardt as Tjener på Marienlyst
- Emil Hass Christensen as Tjener på Marienlyst
- Gull-Maj Norin
