= The Vicar of Vejlby (1931 film) =

1931 film

Præsten i Vejlby
- The vicarage
- Directed by: George Schnéevoigt
- Written by: Steen Steensen Blicher (novel); Fleming Lynge
- Produced by: Eric A. Pettersson
- Starring: Henrik Malberg; Karin Nellemose
- Cinematography: Valdemar Christensen
- Edited by: Valdemar Christensen; C.H. Clemmensen
- Music by: Bent Froda
- Distributed by: Nordisk Tonefilm,
- Release date: 7 May 1931
- Country: Denmark
- Language: Danish language

Præsten i Vejlby (The Vicar of Vejlby) is a 1931 Danish film about a murder in a vicarage directed by George Schnéevoigt and based on a novel by Steen Steensen Blicher. Starring Henrik Malberg and Karin Nellemose it marked the debut of actor Aage Winther-Jørgensen. The film was a remake of the 1920 version by August Blom; and was remade again in 1972 by Claus Ørsted.

One year earlier, George Schnéevoigt had made the first Danish sound film of feature length; however, the dialogue was spoken in Norwegian. Præsten i Vejlby was the first feature-length sound film with Danish dialogue. Although the public had seen short Danish "talkies" since 1923, and experienced foreign features with sound for two years, the Danish language film was unique enough to create a huge success and make the film very profitable.

== Cast ==
- Henrik Malberg ... Præsten Søren Quist
- Karin Nellemose ... Præstedatteren Mette Quist
- Eyvind Johan-Svendsen ... Herredsfogeden Erik Sørensen
- Mathilde Nielsen ... Moster Gertrud
- Gerhard Jessen ... Storbonden Morten Bruus
- Kai Holm ... Karlen Niels Bruus
- Aage Winther-Jørgensen ... Musicerende præst
- Holger-Madsen
- Gudrun Nissen
- Bent Froda ... Organist
