= Liva Weel =

Danish singer and actress

- Born: 31 December 1897; Copenhagen, Denmark
- Died: 22 May 1952 (aged 54); Copenhagen, Denmark
- Years active: 1923–1950

Olivia Marie Olsen (31 December 1897 – 22 May 1952), Liva Weel, was a Danish singer, comedian, and actress. Although she was trained in classical singing, her signature songs and performances were ballads.

== Upbringing ==
Weel grew up in Vesterbro, Copenhagen, where she lived with her parents (detective Carlo Martin Ingomar Olsen and wife Marie Christine Dorthea Olivia Josephine Olsen) at the Mysundegade apartment Off- Istedgade street. At the age of 17, she began to train her voice with opera singer and music educator Hedevig Quiding (16 September 1867 - 22 October 1936). She also received singing training from Vilhelm Herold. Her first performance was in 1917 at a tea party arranged by Hedevig Quiding. She later committed to singing duties at Revues in theatres at Odder Municipality and Nykøbing Falster. Her debut at Nykøbing Falster was a great success, and she signed on to a 10-year contract to perform at the National Scala revues.

== Performance career ==
During Liva Weel's success at the National Scala revues, she teamed up with Carl Alstrup to take on serious roles at the revues.

In 1930, she performed as a guest at the Royal Danish Theatre as Pernille in a satirical play The Fidget by Ludvig Holberg.

There have been many modern adaptations of her songs by Jazz musicians/artists such as Ernst Rolf.

== Personal life ==
On 10 December 1921, Liva Weel married Arne Weel in Holmen's Church. She had a son Jørgen Weel in 1922, and she and Arne Weel divorced 2 years later. On 28 July 1933, Liva remarried to master carpenter Fritz Hueg (31 January 1905 - 15 November 1971). They divorced the following year.

In the late 1920s, she met the author Poul Henningsen (1894–1967), who had a significant impact on her career. He wrote many of the songs that are today associated with Liva Weel such as "We are tied by hand and foot" from the Dyveke revue in Riddersalen theatre. He also wrote the lyrics to Kai Normann Andersen's melodies.

Liva Weel's somewhat chaotic life was filmed in the DR TV series "Call Me Liva" in four episodes. The following year, Sven Holm's novel about Liva was published by Aschehoug's publishing house.

== Songs ==
- Man binder os på mund og hånd (We are tied by hand and foot)
- Gå med i lunden (Join the grove)
- Glemmer du (Do you forget)
- I dit korte liv (In your short life)
- Sig de ord, du ved (Say the words you know)
- Jeg gi'r mit humør en gang lak (I'll give my mood a lick of paint)
- En er for lille og en er for stor (One is too small and one is too big)
- Ta' og kys det hele fra mig (Take and kiss it all away)
- ABC visen (ABC Fish)
- A hvor jeg, ih hvor jeg, uh hvor jeg vil (A where I, oh where I, where I want)
- Kammerat vær en mand (Be a man)
- På min lysegrønne ø (On my bright green island)
- Eskimoer (Eskimo)
- Adrienne (Adrienne)
- De gratis glæder (The free pleasures)
- Nå (Reach)
- La garconne (The hussy)
- Der er dejligt i provinsen (It's lovely in the province)
- Nogen gør det aldrig (Some people never do)
- Han har min sympati (He has my sympathy)
- Jeg ku' bli' no'et så 1-2-3 (I'd be so 1–2–3)
- Slår to hjerter sødt i samme takt (Two hearts beat in the same beat)
- Steincke i rom (Steincke in Rome)
- Jeg har kun lige til skatten (I only have enough for the treasure)
- Det er en af de ting jeg har lært (That's one of the things I've learned)
- Kom karoline (Come on, Caroline)
- Man har så mange glæder (You have so many joys)
- Det' naturen der kræver sin ret (It's nature claiming its right)
- Valencia (Valencia)
- Kan De huske (Do you remember)
- Farvel - alt hvad I kan få (Goodbye - have all you can get)

== Filmography ==
- Livets karneval (1923)
- Odds 777 (1932)
- De blaa drenge (1933)
- Cocktail (1937)
- Frøken Møllers jubilæum (1937)
- Under byens tage (1938)
- Ta' briller på (1942)
- Smedestræde 4 (1950)
