= Nøddebo Præstegård (1934 film) =

- Film Poster
- Directed by: George Schnéevoigt
- Written by: Fleming Lynge
- Starring: Johannes Meyer; Karin Nellemose
- Cinematography: Valdemar Christensen
- Music by: Kai Normann Andersen
- Distributed by: Nordisk Tonefilm
- Release date: 1934
- Country: Denmark
- Language: Danish

Nøddebo Præstegård (Nøddebo Parsonage) is a 1934 Danish family film Christmas classic directed by George Schnéevoigt and written by frequent collaborator Fleming Lynge and Svend Rindom and based on the novel Ved Nytaarstid i Nøddebo Præstegaard written by Henrik Scharling. The score is by Kai Normann Andersen. The film stars Johannes Meyer and Karin Nellemose. The film was remade in 1974.

The film adaptation was dubbed as Denmark’s favorite Christmas comedy. The counterpart theater play which also bears the same title was first played at Folketeatret, 125 years ago. It was performed more than 1,500 times.

== Plot ==
The story revolves around the Christmas adventures of three students in Nøddebo, in the 1860s. Siblings Christopher, Frederick and Nicolai were invited by the local pastor and his wife for the holiday celebration. Christopher and Frederick fell in-love with the daughters of their host family. Nicolai, however, wooed the girls and felt distraught when he found out about his older brothers’ feelings.

== Cast ==
- Hans Egede Budtz
- Charles Tharnæs
- Hans Kurt
- Johannes Meyer
- Katy Valentin
- Karin Nellemose
- Maria Garland
- Schiøler Linck
- Kai Holm
- Rasmus Christiansen
- Karen Poulsen
- Pouel Kern

== See also ==
- List of Christmas films
