= George Schnéevoigt =

Danish film director, cinematographer and actor (1893–1961)

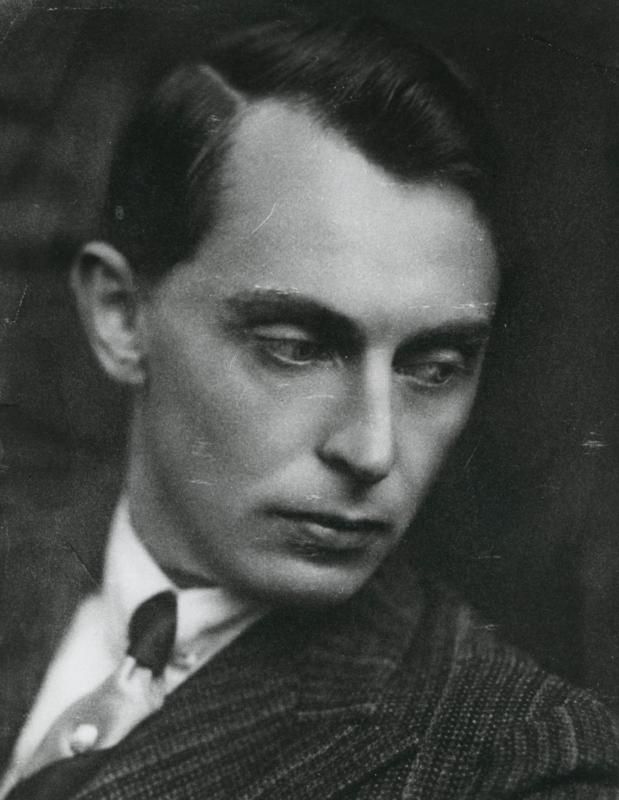
- George Schnéevoigt c. 1920
- Born: Fritz Ernst Georg Fischer; 23 December 1893; Copenhagen, Denmark
- Died: 6 February 1961 (age 67); Copenhagen, Denmark
- Years active: 1915–1942
- Spouse: Tilly von Kaulbach
- Children: Alf Schnéevoigt
- Parents: Hermann Friedrich Fischer (father); Siri Schnéevoigt (mother)

George Schnéevoigt (born Fritz Ernst Georg Fischer; 23 December 1893 – 6 February 1961) was a Danish film director, cinematographer, and actor of the 1910s to early 1940s. Schnéevoigt was born in Copenhagen, Denmark, on 23 December 1893 to the Finnish-born photographer and actress Siri Schnéevoigt, and Hermann Friedrich Fischer. He was the father of photographer Alf Schnéevoigt.

== Early life ==
When Schnéevoigt was 14 years old he traveled with his mother to Berlin as a result of his parents divorce, there he took his mothers last name. Already in his school years Schnéevoigt had developed an interest in acting. He trained as a photographer and studied with actress Tilla Durieux and actor Ludvig Hartau.

== Career ==
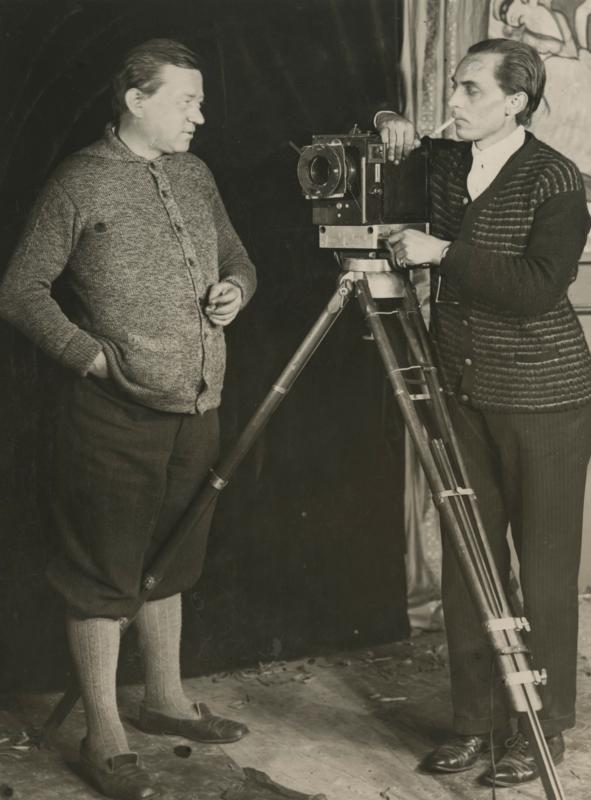
Schnéevoigt talking to an actor while smoking a cigarette

Schnéevoigt made his debut as an actor at the age of 19 at the Neues Schauspilhaus in Berlin, where he met his future wife, the painter Tilly von Kaulbach. In 1914 he returned home to Denmark from Berlin with Kaulbach, together they started their own film company Kaulbachs Kunstfilm. On 23 February 1915 Schnéevoigt and Kaulbach married each other in Christania.

Kaulbachs Kunstfilmdid not have much success, and in Schnéevoigt instead ended up with job at Nordisk Film. At Nordisk Film he worked with Carl Theodor Dreyer as a photographer on films like Blade af Satans Bog from 1921 and Du skal ære din hustru from 1925. Schnéevoigt directed a number of notable films such as Præsten i Vejlby (1931), which was the first Danish sound film, Hotel Paradis (1931), Skal vi vædde en million? (1932), Odds 777 (1932) and Nøddebo Præstegård (1934). Schnéevoigt made his last film Alle mand på dæk in 1942 and was then fired from Nordisk Film. For the last 19 years of his life, he was unemployed in film and mostly used his time painting.

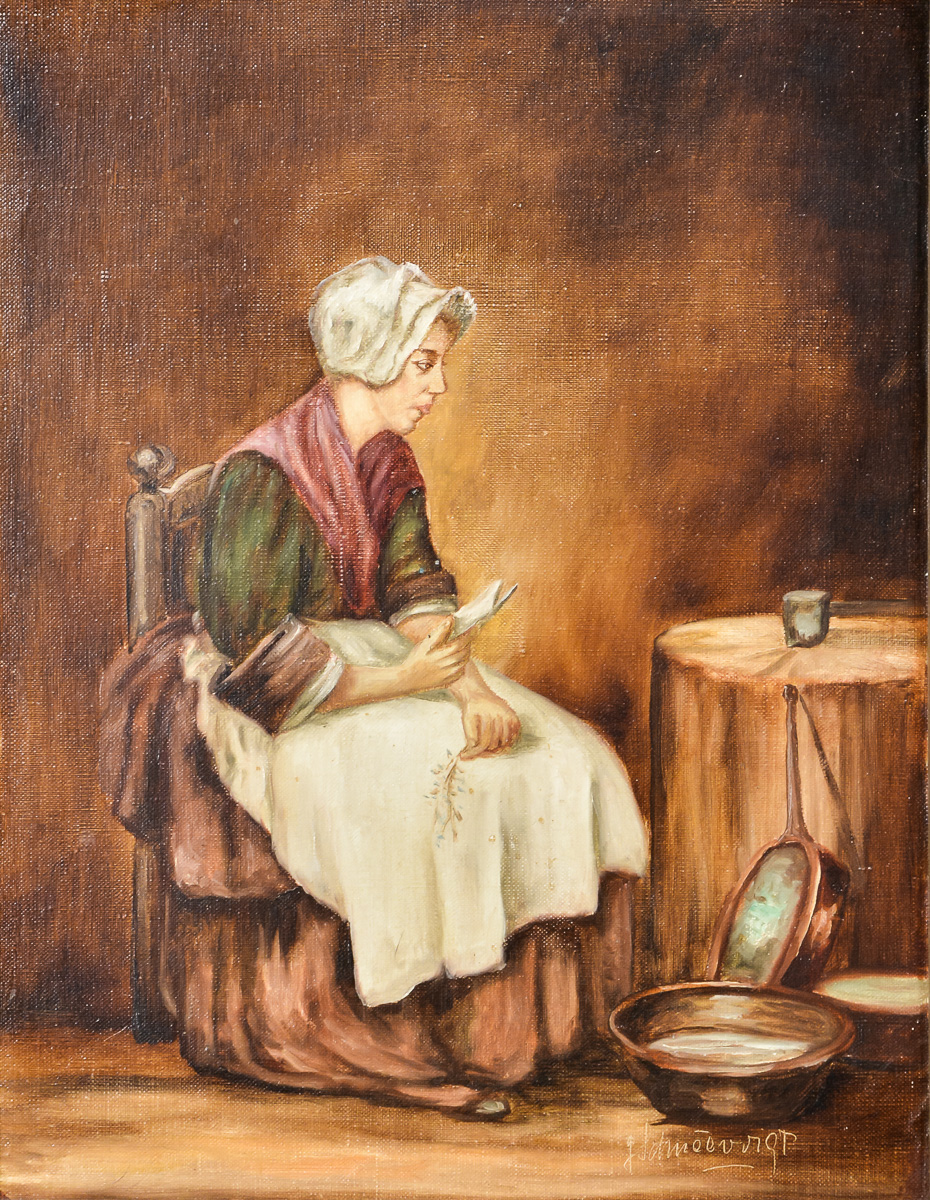
Painting by Schnéevoigt, presumably made sometime during the last 20 years of his life

== Filmography ==
=== Director ===
- Laila (1929)
- Eskimo (1930)
- Præsten i Vejlby (1931)
- Hotel Paradis (1931)
- Skal vi vædde en million? (1932)
- Kirke og orgel (1932)
- Tretten år (1932)
- The White God (1932)
- Odds 777 (1932)
- Nyhavn 17 (1933)
- Tango (1933)
- De blaa drenge (1933)
- Kobberbryllup (1933)
- Lynet (1934)
- Nøddebo Præstegård (1934)
- Rasmines bryllup (1935)
- Sjette trækning (1936)
- Lajla (1937)
- Champagnegaloppen (1938)
- Circus (1939)
- Jeg har elsket og levet (1940)
- Tordenskjold går i land (1942)
- Alle mand på dæk (1942)

=== Actor ===
- Stærkere end dynamit (1914)
- En Gartnerdreng søges (1913)
- Skyggedanserinden (1913)

=== Cinematographer ===
- Viddenes folk (1928)
- Peter the Pirate (1925)
- Du skal ære din hustru (1925)
- Blade af Satans Bog (1921)
