= Else (given name) =

Else is a feminine given name, appearing in German, Danish and Norwegian. It is a shortened form of Elisabeth.

Notable people with the name include:

- Else Ackermann (1933–2019), German politician and pharmacologist
- Else Ahlmann-Ohlsen (1907–1994), Danish fencer
- Else Alfelt (1910–1974), Danish artist
- Else Amann (1923–2018), German skier
- Else Winther Andersen (born 1941), Danish politician
- Else Baker (born 1935), Sinti holocaust survivor
- Else M. Barth (1928–2015), Norwegian philosopher
- Else Baum, Austrian film editor
- Else Beitz (1920–2014), German scholar and Holocaust hero
- Else Berg (1877–1942), Dutch painter
- Else Birkmose (1931–1998), Danish hand- and basketball player
- Else Blangsted (1920–2020), American music editor
- Else Bostelmann (1882–1961), German-born American artist
- Else Breen (1927–2025), Norwegian children's writer
- Else Brems (1908–1995), Danish operatic contralto
- Else Brökelschen (1890–1976), German politician
- Else Christensen (1913–2005), Danish heathenism figure and white separatist
- Else Marie Christiansen (1921–2017), Norwegian speed skater
- Else Christophersen (1915–1968), Norwegian equestrian
- Else Dormitzer (1877–1958), German-Jewish journalist, activist, children's author and poet
- Else Ehser (1894–1968), German actress
- Else Berit Eikeland (born 1957), Norwegian diplomat
- Else Elster (1910–1998), German actress
- Else Færden (born 1952), Norwegian writer
- Else Falk (1872–1956), German women's rights activist
- Else Feldmann (1884–1942), Austrian writer
- Else Fenger (1737–1811), Danish businesswoman
- Else Fischer-Hansen (1905–1996), Danish artist
- Else Fisher (1918–2006), Swedish choreographer
- Else Flebbe, German figure skater
- Else Bugge Fougner (born 1944), Norwegian lawyer and politician
- Else Frenkel-Brunswik (1908–1958), Austrian psychologist
- Else Marie Friis (born 1947), Danish botanist and paleontologist
- Else Frölich (1880–1960), Norwegian-Danish star of silent film
- Else Kollerud Furre (1922–2019), Norwegian politician
- Else Kåss Furuseth (born 1980), Norwegian comedian
- Else Gabriel (born 1962), German artist
- Else Gebel (1905–1964), German communist resistance fighter
- Else Gentner-Fischer (1883–1943), German operatic soprano
- Else Germeten (1918–1992), Norwegian politician
- Else Granheim (1926–1999), Norwegian librarian
- Else Hagen (1914–2010), Norwegian visual artist
- Else Halling (1899–1987), Norwegian textile artist
- Else Hammerich (1936–2021), Danish politician
- Else Hansen (1720–1784), Royal mistress
- Else Haugk (1889–1973), Pioneering Swiss aviator
- Else Heiberg (1910–1972), Norwegian actress
- Else Hench, Austrian luger
- Else Herold (1906–1999), German pianist
- Else Hertzer (1884-1978), German painter and graphic artist
- Else Himmelheber (1905–1944), German activist
- Else Hirsch, German-Jewish teacher, organized children's transports out of Nazi Germany
- Else Hoffa (1885–1964), German gardener
- Else Höfs (1876–1945), German politician
- Else Højgaard (1906–1979), Danish actress and ballerina
- Else Hoppe (born 1900), Czechoslovakian figure skater
- Else Høst (1908–1996), Norwegian literary historian and author
- Else Hueck-Dehio (1897–1976), German author
- Else Imme (1885–1943), German resistance fighter
- Else Jacobsen (1911–1965), Danish swimmer
- Else Marie Jakobsen (1927–2012), Norwegian designer and textile artist
- Else Jarlbak (1911–1963), Danish actress
- Else Jerusalem (1877–1942), Austrian writer
- Else Kastner-Michalitschke (1868–1939), Austrian writer
- Else Kienle (1900–1970), German physician
- Else Kleen (1882–1968), Swedish journalist
- Else Klink (1907–1994), German eurythmist
- Else Koffka (1901–1994), German judge and lawyer
- Else Krüger (1915–2005), Martin Bormann's secretary
- Else Lasker-Schüler (1869–1945), German poet and playwright
- Else Lehmann (1866–1940), German actress
- Else Lidegaard (1933–2025), Danish journalist
- Else Mærsk-Kristensen (born 1952), Danish rower
- Else Mayer (1891–1962), German nun and feminist
- Else Meidner (1901–1987), German painter
- Else Meier (1901–1933), German politician
- Else Merke (1920–2005), German politician
- Else Michelet (1942–2021), Norwegian journalist
- Else Holmelund Minarik (1920–2012), American children's writer
- Else von Möllendorff (1913–1982), German actress
- Else Moltke (1888–1986), Danish countess and feminist
- Else Mundal (born 1944), Norwegian philologist
- Else Nizigama Ntamagiro (born 1972), Burundian diplomat
- Else Oppler-Legband (1875 -1965), German architect
- Else Øyen (born 1934), Norwegian sociologist
- Else Paaske (born 1941), Danish mezzo-soprano concert singer
- Else Marie Pade (1924–2016), Danish composer
- Else Pappenheim (1911–2009), American neurologist
- Else Peerenboom-Missong (1893–1958), German politician
- Else Petersen (1910–2002), Danish actress
- Else Poulsson (1909–2002), Norwegian artist
- Else Praasterink (born 2003), Dutch diver
- Else Quecke (1907–2004), German actress
- Else Rambausek (1907–1994), Austrian actress
- Else Raydt (1883–1931), German artist and craftswoman
- Else Regensteiner (1906–2003), German-born American artist
- Else Repål (1930–2015), Norwegian politician
- Else Reval (1893–1978), German actress
- Else von Richthofen (1874–1973), German social scientist
- Else Marie Tveit Rødby (born 1982), Norwegian politician
- Else Roesdahl (born 1942), Danish medievalist and archaeologist
- Else Rosenfeld (born 1891), Holocaust survivor
- Else Samulon-Guttmann (1898–1944), German lawyer and Holocaust victim
- Else Kai Sass (1912–1987), Danish art historian
- Else Schmitt (1921–1995), German politician
- Else Schmitz-Gohr (1901–1987), German pianist
- Else Schøtt (1895–1989), Danish operatic soprano
- Else Sehrig-Vehling (1897–1994), German painter
- Else Seifert (1879–1968), German photographer
- Else Shepherd (1944–2023), South African-Australian engineer and academic
- Else Skogan (born 1963), Norwegian curler
- Else Sohn-Rethel (1853–1933), German painter
- Else Streit (born 1869), German composer
- Else Thalemann (1901–1984), German photographer
- Else Torp (born 1968), Danish soprano
- Else Trangbæk (born 1946), Danish gymnast
- Else Unger (1873–1936), Austrian designer
- Else Ury (1877–1943), German Jewish novelist
- Else Went, American playwright
- Else Wenz-Viëtor (1882–1973), German children's book illustrator and artist
- Else Werring (1905–1989), Norwegian royal hostess
- Else Wildhagen (1861–1944), German writer
- Else Ragni Yttredal (born 1968), Norwegian speed skater
- Else Zeuthen (1897–1975), Danish peace activist and politician
- Else Züblin-Spiller (1881–1948), Swiss journalist and temperance activist

== See also ==
- Else (disambiguation)
- Else (surname)
- Else-Marie, a compound given name
- Else-Marthe Sørlie Lybekk (born 1978), Norwegian handball player
