= Elsa =

Elsa may refer to:

== ELSA (acronym) ==
- ELSA Technology, a manufacturer of computer hardware
- English Language Skills Assessment
- English Longitudinal Study of Ageing
- Ethical, Legal and Social Aspects research
- European Law Students' Association
- European League of Stuttering Associations
- European Long-Range Strike Approach
- Evangelical Lutheran Synod of Australia, a group in the history of the Lutheran Church of Australia
- Experimental light-sport aircraft (E-LSA)

== People ==
- Elsa (given name), a female given name
- Pedro Elsa (1901–unknown), Argentine Olympic athlete

=== Characters ===
- Elsa (Frozen), fictional character from the Disney animated franchise, Frozen
- Elsa von Brabant, a character in the 1850 Richard Wagner opera Lohengrin

== Places ==
- Elsa, California, a place in California, U.S.
- Elsa, Texas, U.S.
- Elsa, Yukon, Canada

== Other ==
- 182 Elsa, an asteroid
- Elsa (album), debut album of Elsa Lunghini
- Elsa (river), Tuscany, Italy
- Elsa the lioness, subject of the book and film Born Free
- Storm Elsa, 13–20 December 2019
- The abbreviation for × Elearethusa, an orchid genus
- Hurricane Elsa, Category 1 Atlantic hurricane in 2021

== See also ==
- Elsa & Fred (disambiguation)
- Else (disambiguation)
