= Regensteiner =

Regensteiner is a German surname. Notable people with the surname include:

- Else Regensteiner (1906–2003), German weaver and textile designer
- Theodore Regensteiner (1868–1952), German printer
