= Else =

Else may refer to:

== Places ==
- Else (Lenne), a river in Germany, tributary to the Lenne
- Else (Werre), a river in Germany, tributary to the Werre

== People ==
- Else (given name)
- Else (surname)

== Music ==
- "Else" (song), a 1999 rock song
- The Else, a 2007 alternative rock album

== Others ==
- Else (2024 film), French-Belgian science fiction horror film
- Else (programming), a concept in computer programming
- MV Else, a Kriegsmarine coastal tanker
- Else, a German ship, later renamed HMS Prize

== See also ==
- Elsa (disambiguation)
