= Hagemeyer (surname) =

Hagemeyer is a surname. Notable people with the surname include:

- Alice Lougee Hagemeyer (born 1934), American librarian
- Johan Hagemeyer (1884–1962), Dutch horticulturist, vegetarian, and photographer
- Maria Hagemeyer (1896–1991), German judge
- Fernando Hagemeyer (1997), Brazilian, Electrical Engineer
