= Walter Lenck =

German artist

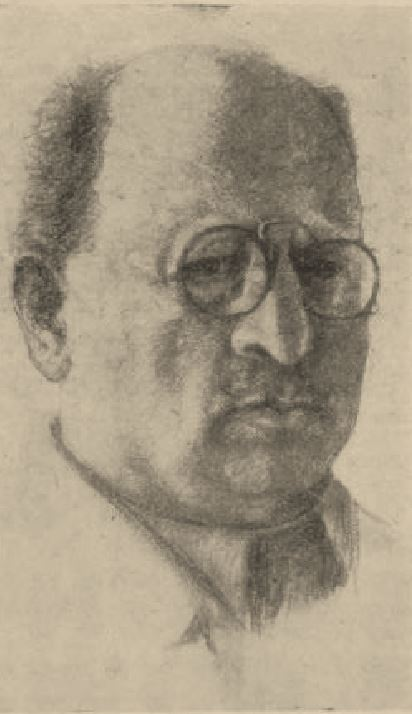
- Selfportrait
- Born: Walter Lewy; September 2, 1873; Berlin, Germany
- Died: August 13, 1952 (aged 78); Johannesburg, South Africa

Walter Lenck (1873–1952) was a versatile German artist – sculptor, draftsman, painter, architect, cellist, composer and dramatist. Escaping Nazi persecution he emigrated in 1936 to Johannesburg, South Africa, where he lived until his death. Between 1911 and 1913 he changed his original surname, Lewy, to Lenck.

== Life ==
He was born in Berlin on September 2, 1873, son of banker Oscar Lewy and his wife Rosalie, née Samuelson, first cousin of her husband.

From a young age he was fond of drawing animals at the zoo and illustrating scenes from Greek mythology, with a special interest in the saga of the Argonauts. Dissatisfied with the work in his father's bank he did sketches of clients. Despite his fondness for drawing he began his artistic career with musical studies and became a virtuoso cellist. Having always been interested in sculpture, he then devoted himself to this branch of art at the Royal Academy in Berlin as a disciple of the sculptor Paul Friedrich Meyerheim, simultaneously continuing architecture studies, and then in Paris, where he was influenced by the school of Antoine-Louis Barye and in Brussels with Constantin Meunier. After completing his studies, he made a living painting portraits until he earned a reputation as a sculptor.

In 1910, the German government sent his monumental sculpture Jason to the International Railway and Land Transportation Exhibition, one of several held that year in Buenos Aires on the occasion of the centenary of Argentine independence. Still as Walter Lewy the artist traveled from Hamburg, embarking on the steamer König Friedrich August on May 21. At the International Art Exhibition, held at San Martín Square, he presented three bronze sculptures.

The reason is not known, but by the end of 1913 and perhaps when he moved to Vienna he had already changed his surname, since he appeared as Walter Lenck, cellist, in a December announcement that year of a concert to be held there in January 1914. He would spend fourteen years in Vienna where, without neglecting his sculpture, he developed a wide-ranging musical activity as a cello and viola da gamba instrumentalist, and participated in design contests for public monuments.

In 1916 he organized an exhibition of his architectural and sculptural works in a room at the Musikverein, which he personally rented. The contract stipulated that the association would receive in payment the amount collected from the sale of tickets, once the installation and administrative expenses incurred by the artist had been covered. The show would open on May 2 and would extend, in principle, for a month; it received favorable reviews.

That same year, Lenck was one of the founders of the Collegium Musicum in Vienna, an organization dedicated to rescue and disseminate works of ancient music by German composers, performing frequent concerts in which he played the cello and viola da gamba.

In September 1922, Gertrude Richardson Brigham, a correspondent for The Washington Times, met Lenck during a visit to Vienna as part of a tour of European capitals. She was interested in contacting painters and sculptors for an exhibition of modern art planned by the newspaper, to be held the following season in Washington. She describes him in an article published on October 22 that included photos of two works by the artist, written under her pseudonym, Viktor Flambeau:

"An enthusiastic visitor was Herr Walter Lenck, one of the most versatile artists Flambeau has ever met. Mr. Lenck is an excellent sculptor, painter and architect, and also a professional musician, especially devoted to the old instruments, the viola (Note: She meant viola da gamba, a little-known instrument then.) and others, and to the classical music. For Lenck has traveled widely, visited South America, and one of his best animal sculptures is erected in Buenos Aires. Another is in Berlin. He has not yet been in America, but he is very desirous of coming there, yet again the problem of the present rate of exchange. Flambeau and his party adjourned to the hotel cafe, for tea, where they all discussed plans for the Vienna Exposition in Washington. Mr. Lenck called again next day, with a musical friend, director of an orchestra, and the visit to America was further considered."

— Viktor Flambeau

He lived in Berlin until his emigration to South Africa in 1936, where he continued his sculptural work; the catalog of a solo show in Johannesburg in 1945 lists more than a dozen bronzes of animals, his great specialty, and portrait busts, oil paintings and drawings. He did not neglect his activity as a musical composer and dramatist, although he had to stop playing the cello for medical reasons.

He died in Johannesburg on August 13, 1952, aged 78, and was buried there.

== Work ==
=== Sculpture ===
The monumental Jason and the Bulls of Aeëtes presents the hero when he has just subdued the two ferocious fire-breathing animals, the first of the tasks called for by Aeëtes, king of Colchis, when Jason claimed the golden fleece.

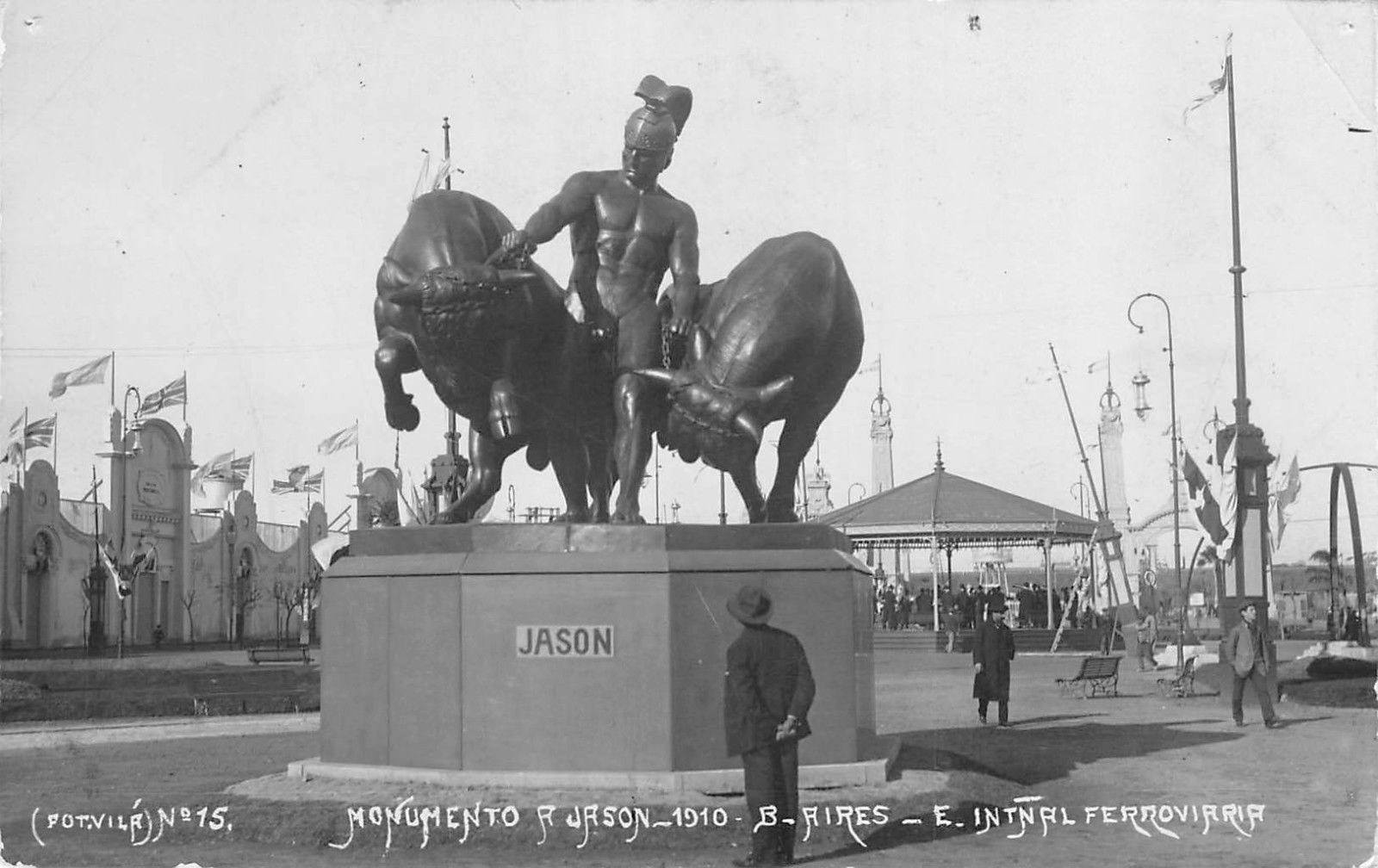
Exhibited in Buenos Aires in 1910

It was fourteen feet tall without the base and was completed in 1909, at the artist's expense. The German government sent the bronze to Buenos Aires in 1910 and it was installed at the center of the Parque de las Naciones, in the International Railway and Land Transportation Exhibition, one of several held to celebrate the centenary of Argentine independence. According to different sources it received the Grand Prize, something that has not been possible to verify. The local government tried to buy it for 250,000 marks, but the German government did not authorize the sale. Returning home in 1911 and unable to find a buyer for the piece, the artist lent it to Berlin Zoo, where it was installed in front of the Elephant House. During the inflationary crisis of the mid-1920s Lenck, in need of money, offered to sell it to the city of Berlin but although he did not request a high sum negotiations did not prosper. In 1927 the Leipzig merchant Otto Schultz offered 25,000 marks for the work, of which he paid 20,000. Before the operation was finalized he went bankrupt; a group of anonymous donors led by Johannes Ebbing, director of the Leipzig zoo, finally collected the remaining sum and bought the sculpture. The artist supervised the dismantling of the work in Berlin in February 1928. It was erected in Leipzig Zoo the following May, coinciding with the fiftieth anniversary of the park.

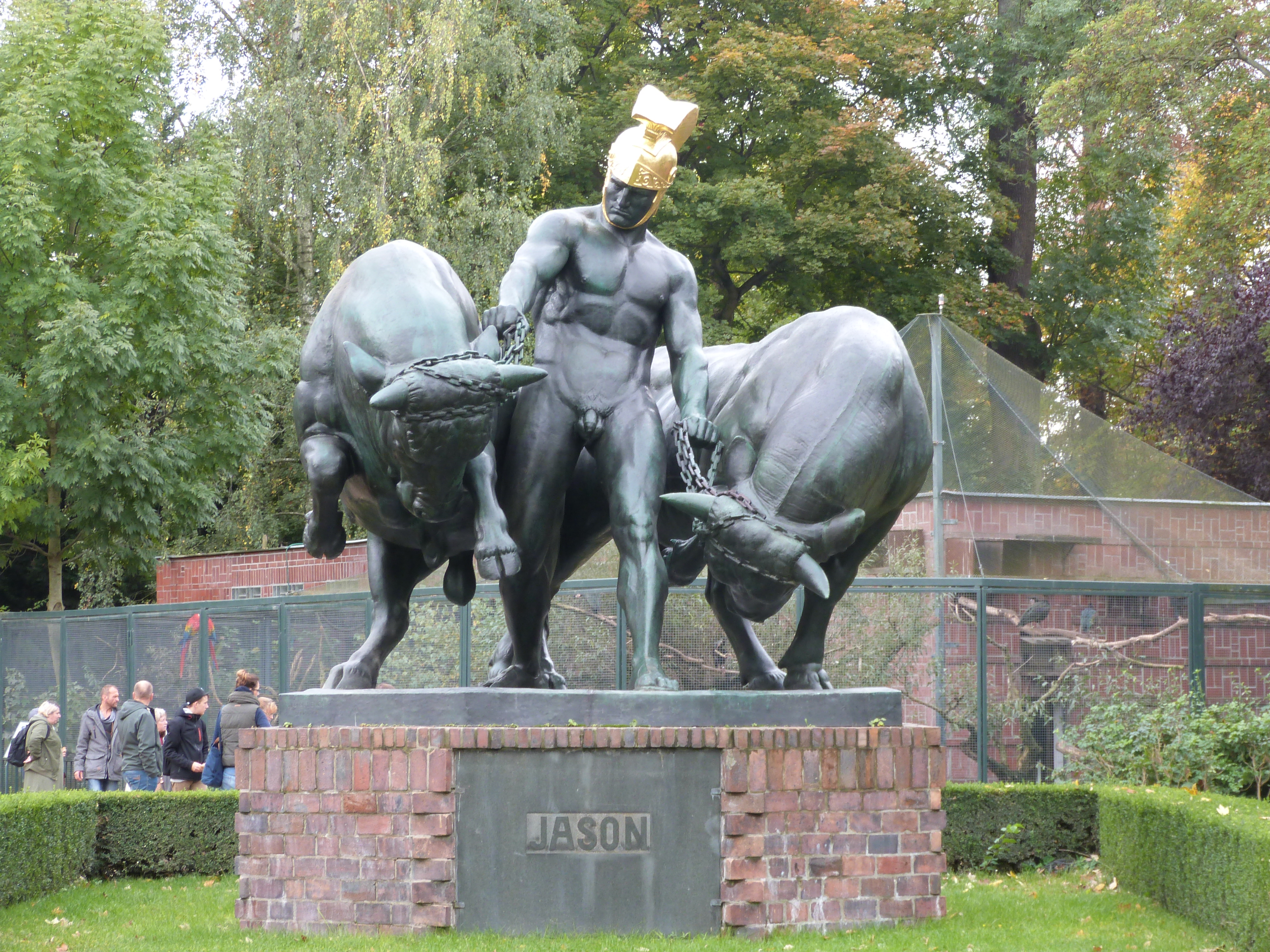
At Leipzig Zoo, after the restoration

Not everyone welcomed the work in its new destination. The painter Max Schwimmer criticized it harshly in a newspaper article entitled "Jason the Terrible", calling it "monumental kitsch".

In 2015 it was fully restored by the Free State of Saxony at a cost of 33,000 euros and the hero's helmet recovered its original gilding. Small-scale versions appear occasionally at art auctions.

Throughout his career he made a large number of animal sculptures in bronze. The three pieces he presented at the Centennial International Art Exhibition in Buenos Aires – Archer, Lion, and Buffalo and Lion, appear in the catalog but with no indication of dimensions. An almost life-size version of the third is installed at Memorial Boulevard, Johannesburg Zoo, South Africa, donated by the artist in 1936.

Two sources mention another monumental bronze, Fighting Mammoths (or Mastodons). One of them says that it was bought by the Berlin City Council in 1929 and installed in that city's zoo. The park was destroyed in the last days of World War II and the current administration has no records or photographs of this work in its archives.

He made portrait busts of personalities of his time such as King Edward VIII, Paul von Hindenburg, the German president Friedrich Ebert, Chief Rabbi Juda L. Landau of South Africa, R. Wolff and H. Tietz, Gustav Marchet, among others, and a statuette of Empress Zita of Bourbon-Parma with her son Otto, the crown prince. A limited edition of an image of the popular Austrian actor and operetta tenor Alexander Girardi, who had died in April 1918, was advertised in a July newspaper; the piece, 65 cm tall and made of polychrome imitation majolica, was priced at 225 crowns.

Some years later, the Berlin City Council commissioned a work illustrating the Siegfried cycle, but when Hitler assumed power relations with the sculptor broke down and the work was never carried out.

=== Architecture ===
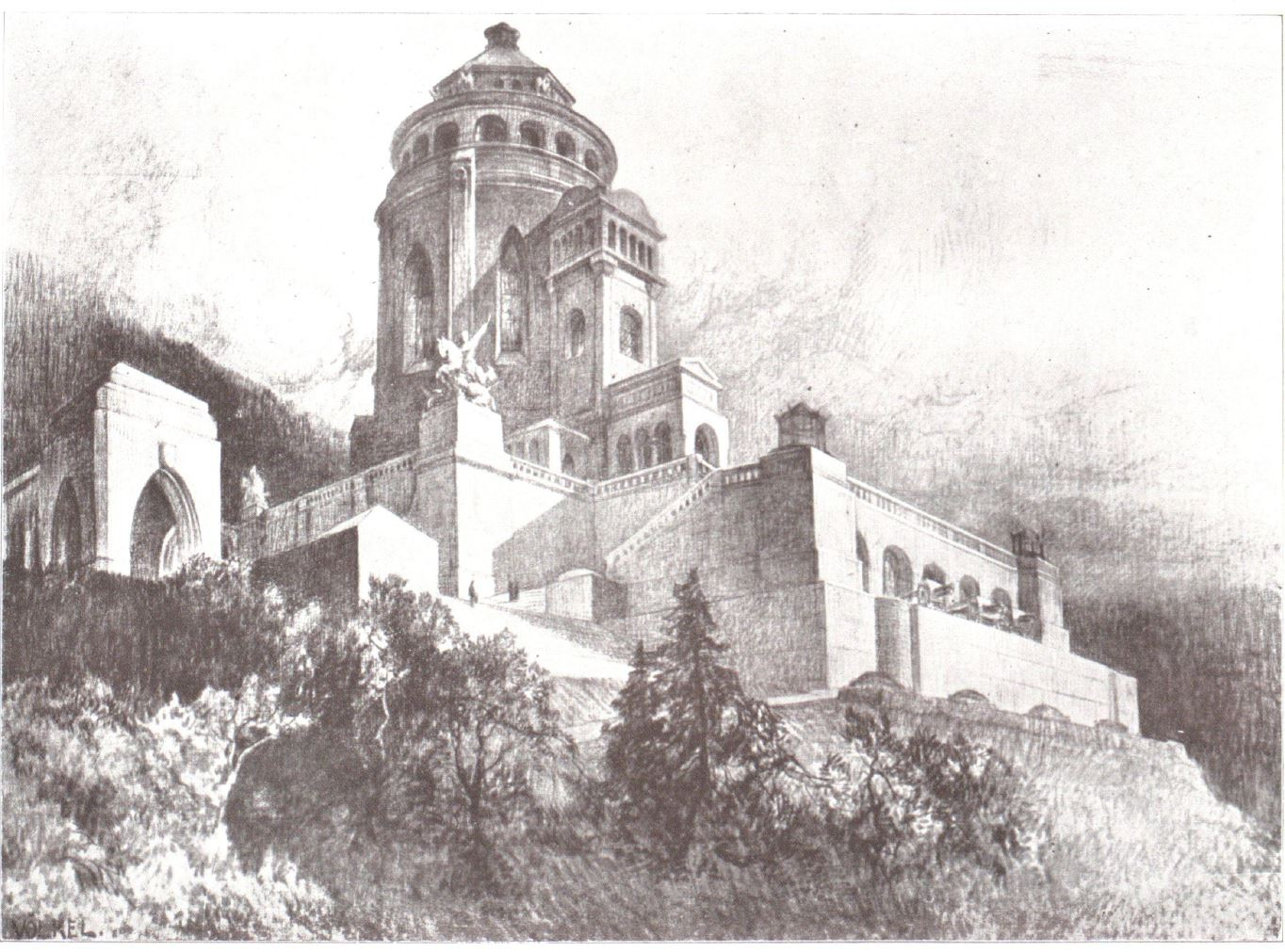
Reinhold Völkel: Perspective of the Monument to Peace (Walter Lenck)

Lenck designed several monuments, none of which were built, but he presented the plans and models at his 1916 exhibition in Vienna.

The Monument to Peace and Alliance stood out; it was conceived to be built on the side of a hill at the border between Bohemia and Saxony, in homage to the unity between Germany and Austria-Hungary. The model appears in photographs published in newspapers, in the poster designed by the architect Otto Polak for the exhibition (Note: A copy is in the collection of the Albertina in Vienna) and in a charcoal perspective by Reinhold Völkel. The great central tower of the mausoleum is surrounded by terraces and galleries, decorated with sculptural groups on pilasters, of two of which Lenck exhibited plaster models.

In 1915 he designed a memorial to the sinking of the Austro-Hungarian submarine U-12 and its commander, Lieutenant Egon Lerch, to be erected in Vienna. The sinking, witnessed by ships of the Italian navy during the war, took place on August 7, 1915, at the Venice lagoon entrance, apparently when the submarine hit a mine. The design combined the figure of the submarine and the letter U into a plastic unit.

Another design was for a Bulgarian Monument, depicting the meeting in Serbia of three riders – one Austrian, one German and one Bulgarian.

=== Music and theater ===
Numerous reviews of concerts in newspapers of the time highlight his successful professional career in Vienna as a performer of the cello and the then little-known viola da gamba. His works as a composer, in practically all forms but preferring the symphony, were well received in Germany. In 1936 he was working on a dramatic trilogy, Emmanuel, a play with musical interludes.
