= Pappenheimer =

Pappenheimer may refer to:

- the regiment of cuirassiers led by Gottfried Heinrich Graf zu Pappenheim
- the Pappenheimer rapier
- a member of the noble house of Pappenheim, see Pappenheim (state)
- an inhabitant or native of Pappenheim
- Pappenheimer family

== See also ==
- Pappenheimer bodies, abnormal deposits of iron within red blood cells
- Pappenheim (disambiguation)
