= Else-Marie =

Else-Marie is a compound given name, composed of Else and Marie. Notable people with the name include:

- Else-Marie Hansen (1904–2003), Danish actress, sometimes referred to simply as Else-Marie
- Else Marie Jakobsen (1927–2012), Norwegian designer and textile artist
- Else-Marie Lindgren (born 1949), Swedish politician
- Else-Marie Ljungdahl (born 1942), Swedish sprint canoer
