= Pappenheim (disambiguation) =

Pappenheim is a town in Bavaria, Germany.

Pappenheim may also refer to:

Places:

- Pappenheim (state), a small state in the Holy Roman Empire
- Kleinschmalkalden, a village in Thuringia, called 'Pappenheim' from 1945 until 1990

People:

- Artur Pappenheim (1870–1916), German physician
- Bertha Pappenheim (1859–1936), German feminist and humanist
- Else Pappenheim (1911–2009), Austrian-American psychiatrist/neurologist, daughter of Martin Pappenheim
- Eugenie Pappenheim (1840s–1924), Austrian-American operatic soprano
- Gottfried Heinrich Graf zu Pappenheim (1594–1632), a field marshal of the Holy Roman Emperor
- Martin Pappenheim (1881–1943), Austrian psychiatrist-neurologist, a colleague of Sigmund Freud
- Solomon Pappenheim (1740–1814), linguist and poet
