= Brauna =

Braúna or Brauna may refer to:

- the name of the timber from the Brazilian tree Melanoxylum brauna Schott (fam. Fabaceae)
- an alternative name for quebracho wood from Schinopsis spp (fam. Anacardiaceae) in Brazil
- Braúna, a municipality in São Paulo, Brazil
- 1411 Brauna, a Main belt asteroid
