= Else Sehrig-Vehling =

German painter (1897–1994)

Else Sehrig-Vehling (26 May 1897 in Düsseldorf – 12 February 1994 in Bad Salzuflen) was a German expressionist. She was the daughter of the Architect Heinrich Vehling (1868 in Düsseldorf – 1944 in Koblenz) and of Eva Hubertine (maiden name Habes) (1874 in Düsseldorf – 1953).

She was a member of an artist group called Das Junge Rheinland (The Young Rhinelanders). Her style was influenced by her close friendships to Ernst Ludwig Kirchner, Carl Barth, Max Schwimmer, Fritz Winter and other German artists.

In 1921, Else Sehrig-Vehling was one of the first female art students of the Arts Academy of the city of Düsseldorf. The City Museum of Düsseldorf honoured her with an exhibition in 1983, showing her early expressionist works.

In 1933 she married Hermann Sehrig, a German artist and Member of the Deutsche Werkbund. His works are in many public collections such as the German Ceramic Museum. She is listed in the well known German art dictionary Allgemeines Künstlerlexikon (World Biographical Dictionary of Artists).

== Exhibitions ==
Year	Museum/Gallery
1930	Juryfreie Kunstausstellung des Vereins zur Veranstaltung von Kunstausstellungen Düsseldorf 16.05. - 05.10.1930
1941	Die deutsche Malerin und Bildhauerin - Kunsthalle Düsseldorf
1941	Herbstausstellung Düsseldorfer Künstler - Kunsthalle Düsseldorf
1954	Große Weihnachtsausstellung der bild. Künstler von Rheinland Westfalen - Kunstpalast
1955	Große Weihnachtsausstellung der bild. Künstler von Rheinland Westfalen - Kunstpalast
1956	Große Weihnachtsausstellung der bild. Künstler von Rheinland Westfalen - Kunstpalast
1957	Große Weihnachtsausstellung der bild. Künstler von Rheinland Westfalen - Kunstpalast
1961	Große Weihnachtsausstellung der bild. Künstler von Rheinland Westfalen - Kunstpalast
1962	Große Weihnachtsausstellung der bild. Künstler von Rheinland Westfalen - Kunstpalast
1962	Bienale Società per le Belle Arti, Villa Ciani - Lugano
1963	Große Weihnachtsausstellung der bild. Künstler von Rheinland Westfalen - Kunstpalast
1963	Galerie May/Düsseldorf
1964	Große Weihnachtsausstellung der bild. Künstler von Rheinland Westfalen - Kunstpalast
1966	Große Weihnachtsausstellung der bild. Künstler von Rheinland Westfalen - Kunstpalast
1974	Palais de la Skala, Monte Carlo
1975	Tessiner Malerein - Rocco Bello
1978	Kunst in der Sparkasse Hattingen - Else Sehrig Vehling
1978	Düsseldorfer Künstlerinnen eV Malerei - Plastik - Grafik Orangerie Düsseldorf Benrath
1979	Bilker Heimatfreunde - Düsseldorf
1983	Else Sehrig Vehling Sonderausstellung im Düsseldorfer Stadtmuseum

== Public collections ==
At the Stadtmuseum (City Museum) in Düsseldorf - Watercolour 1950 titled "Mädchen" (Girl)
