= Else Peerenboom-Missong =

German economist and politician (1893–1958)

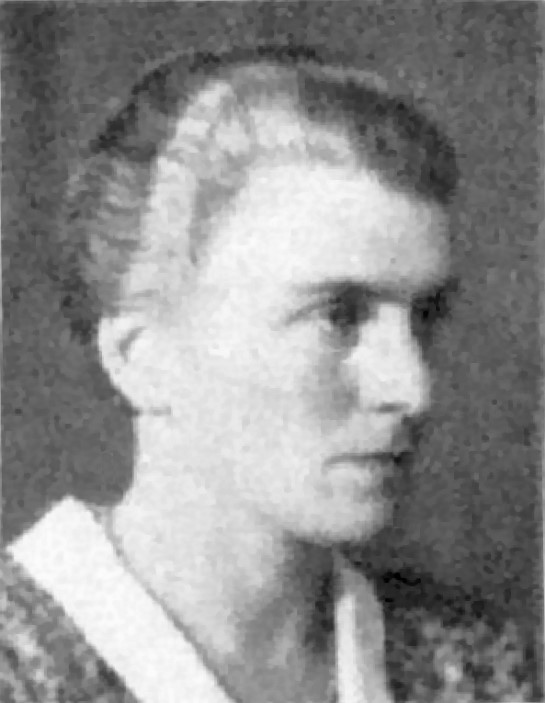
- Else Peerenboom-Missong in 1933

Personal details
- Born: Else Peerenboom; 13 October 1893 Brauna, Saxony, German Empire
- Died: 31 August 1958 (aged 64) Cologne, West Germany
- Party: Centre Party; Christian Democratic Union
- Spouse: Anton Missong
- Education: University of Bonn; Ludwig-Maximilians-Universität München; University of Freiburg
- Occupation: Economist, social worker, teacher, politician

Else Peerenboom-Missong (née Peerenboom; 13 October 1893 – 31 August 1958) was a German economist, social worker and politician. A member of the Centre Party, she represented the party in the Reichstag from 1930 until the end of the party system under Nazi Germany in 1933. She later became involved in the foundation of the Christian Democratic Union in the Rhineland and was a member of the Consultative State Assembly of Rhineland-Palatinate in 1946.

Peerenboom was also active in the professionalisation of Catholic social work. She worked for the German Caritas Association in Freiburg, where she directed its social women's school, and later worked in public welfare administration and Catholic women's organisations. During the Nazi period she spent extended periods in South America, where she helped establish social-welfare training institutions in Uruguay and Venezuela. She was monitored by the Gestapo and was briefly imprisoned during the 1944 Aktion Gitter arrests of former political opponents of the Nazi regime. After the Second World War, she helped organise the new Christian Democratic movement in the French occupation zone of Germany. Her political career ended in 1946 after she criticised the social and food situation in the French occupation zone in a speech to the Consultative State Assembly.

== Early life and education ==
Else Peerenboom was born in Brauna, then in the Kingdom of Saxony, to Johann Alexander Peerenboom, a forestry official, and Maria Dillmann. Her father died in 1898, when Peerenboom was four years old. Her mother subsequently returned with her to Linz am Rhein, where they lived with Maria's unmarried brother, Anton Dillmann. Dillmann operated an iron and household-goods business and supported Peerenboom's education. His political interests and commitment to social questions also influenced her outlook.

From 1899 or 1900, Peerenboom attended the higher girls' school operated by Franciscan nuns in Linz. In 1908 or 1909, she transferred to a boarding school operated by the Sisters of the Sacré-Cœur in Vaals, in the Netherlands. There she completed examinations in French and English and prepared for work as a language teacher. One of her fellow pupils was Rose Fitzgerald Kennedy, with whom Peerenboom subsequently maintained a lifelong correspondence.

In July 1912, Peerenboom passed the examination qualifying her to teach languages and subsequently worked as a substitute teacher at the girls' school in Linz. At the German Catholic Congress in Metz in August 1913, she heard a lecture by her relative Wilhelm Marx on Catholic academics and the Church. The shortage of Catholic academics in Germany, which he associated with the effects of the Kulturkampf, encouraged her to pursue university education.

At the time, women faced significant barriers to higher education in Germany. In Prussia, women had only been admitted to universities since 1908. With financial and personal support from her uncle, Peerenboom prepared for the Abitur as an external candidate at a boys' secondary school in Münster. She passed the examination in 1917, aged 23.

Peerenboom initially studied modern languages but subsequently concentrated on economics and political science. She studied at the University of Bonn, the Ludwig-Maximilians-Universität München, and the University of Freiburg. In 1921, she received the degree of Dr. rer. pol. from the University of Freiburg. Her doctoral dissertation, awarded magna cum laude, examined the French socialist Jean Jaurès as a philosopher, socialist and politician.

== Social work and public administration ==
On 1 November 1921, Peerenboom joined the German Caritas Association in Freiburg. She worked in its statistical department and compiled two substantial statistical surveys of Catholic charitable institutions in Germany. The first, published in 1924, covered institutions providing residential or institutional care; the second, published in 1926, covered semi-open welfare institutions and open health care.

From 1925, she also taught at the Caritas Association's social women's school in Freiburg, including courses in welfare work. She subsequently became its acting director. Her educational approach emphasised personal responsibility and independent decision-making by students. She gave students responsibility for managing the school's residential facilities, an approach that conflicted with the more supervisory practices favoured by the association's leadership. The disagreement contributed to her departure from the German Caritas Association in 1927.

After leaving Caritas, Peerenboom briefly worked for the People's Association for Catholic Germany in Mönchengladbach. In 1928, she entered the Prussian civil service and became acting head of the welfare department of the Münster administrative district, serving with the rank of Regierungsrätin. The district president was Rudolf Amelunxen, whom she already knew from his earlier work in the Prussian welfare administration.

In January 1930, Peerenboom became a political-education officer for the Central Association of Catholic Women's and Mothers' Associations in Düsseldorf. She criticised the organisation's male-dominated structure in a memorandum entitled Gedanken zu einer Palastrevolution ("Thoughts on a Palace Revolution"). She argued that an organisation devoted to making women independent and responsible citizens should itself give women a greater role in its leadership. The association subsequently appointed two women as members of its executive body. Peerenboom regarded political and civic education for women as particularly important as political radicalisation increased at the beginning of the 1930s.

Peerenboom also published on social and political questions. Among her known publications was an article on the right to work, Gedanken zum Recht auf Arbeit, published in Die christliche Frau in 1929.

== Reichstag ==
Peerenboom was elected to the Reichstag as a Centre Party candidate in all four Reichstag elections held between 1930 and 1933. At the 14 September 1930 election, she entered the Reichstag through the party's national list. She was returned at the 31 July 1932, 6 November 1932, and 5 March 1933 elections as a candidate in the Koblenz-Trier constituency.

Her parliamentary career coincided with the final crisis of the Weimar Republic. From 1930 the Reichstag increasingly operated alongside presidential governments that relied on emergency decrees issued under Article 48 of the Weimar Constitution. The political fragmentation produced by the elections of 1930 and 1932 made stable parliamentary majorities increasingly difficult to establish.

After Adolf Hitler became Chancellor of Germany on 30 January 1933, the Reichstag was presented with the Enabling Act on 23 March. The Centre Party ultimately supported the legislation. Whether Peerenboom opposed the bill in an earlier internal trial vote of the Centre parliamentary group has been reported by some authors, but the claim cannot be established from surviving evidence. The Centre parliamentary group voted in favour of the act in the Reichstag itself.

The Enabling Act transferred legislative authority to the Nazi government and became a decisive step in the destruction of parliamentary democracy. The Centre Party was dissolved on 5 July 1933. Peerenboom's Reichstag career consequently came to an end.

== Activities during the Nazi period ==
After the Nazi seizure of power, Peerenboom no longer had a political career in Germany. In July 1933, shortly after the signing of the Reichskonkordat between Nazi Germany and the Holy See, she travelled to the Vatican and met Eugenio Pacelli, then Cardinal Secretary of State and later Pope Pius XII. According to the biographical account published by the Konrad Adenauer Foundation, she used the meeting to report critically on political developments in Germany and the Catholic Church's position towards the National Socialist state.

Peerenboom subsequently turned much of her attention to social work and migration in South America. In 1934 she accompanied young Catholic women to Brazil in connection with attempts to establish agricultural livelihoods outside Nazi Germany. She also promoted training courses for young people considering emigration to South America. During a further stay in 1936 she helped prepare the establishment of social women's schools in Uruguay and Venezuela.

In 1937 she founded a social women's school in Montevideo, Uruguay, and directed it until 1939. During this period she also wrote Einführung in die Wohlfahrtspflege, an introduction to social welfare work, and translated it into Portuguese.

The outbreak of the Second World War in September 1939 prevented further German educational assignments abroad. Peerenboom returned to Linz. She had a house built there in 1935, which was later destroyed by bombing in 1945.

In 1941, she married Anton Missong (1882–1962), a former president of the Cologne regional labour office. The couple spent part of the war years in Königsberg.

Peerenboom had already attracted the attention of the Gestapo because of her political activities before 1933. Following the failed 20 July plot against Hitler in 1944, the Nazi regime launched a broad campaign of arrests against former political opponents. Peerenboom-Missong was arrested during the operation known as Aktion Gitter or Aktion Gewitter. Gestapo records described her as an active representative of the Centre Party who had been prominent in opposing National Socialism before 1933 and had spoken at Centre Party meetings. She was imprisoned at the district court prison in Linz am Rhein. She was released after the authorities found no evidence connecting her with the assassination attempt.

== Postwar political career ==
After the end of the war, Peerenboom-Missong became involved in the effort to create a new Christian political movement. Former Centre Party politicians and other Christian democrats sought to establish an interdenominational party rather than simply revive the pre-1933 Centre Party. The experience of the Nazi dictatorship and the displacement of millions of Germans after the war were among the factors that encouraged the broader Christian-democratic approach.

In June 1945, Peerenboom-Missong participated in a founding meeting of the Christian Democratic movement in the Rhineland at the Kolping House in Cologne. She became a member of its inter-zonal liaison committee. The French occupation authorities did not permit the establishment of political parties in their zone until December 1945. On 31 January 1946, she participated in the establishment of the Christian Democratic Party for Rhineland-Hesse-Nassau.

Peerenboom-Missong worked closely with Franz-Josef Wuermeling, whom she had known since their student days in Freiburg. She undertook organisational and clerical work for the new party, including correspondence, membership administration, preparation of speeches and translation of party material into French. She also travelled through the region to speak at political meetings. The first membership meeting in Linz took place on 28 May 1946, and the local organisation was formally constituted on 20 August.

In 1946 she was appointed acting head of the State Youth Office (Landesjugendamt) in Koblenz by Wilhelm Boden, the first minister-president of the newly established state of Rhineland-Palatinate. She was also elected to the Linz municipal council and the Neuwied district council.

== Consultative State Assembly of Rhineland-Palatinate ==
In 1946, Peerenboom-Missong became one of the members of the Consultative State Assembly of Rhineland-Palatinate, the body charged with assisting in the preparation of a constitution for the newly established state. The assembly had 127 members, including only a small number of women; the Konrad Adenauer Foundation identifies Peerenboom-Missong as one of seven women among its members.

At the assembly's constituent meeting on 22 November 1946 at the Koblenz Theatre, Peerenboom-Missong spoke during a debate about immediate measures to address the severe food and supply situation. She called for action against hunger and poor health and argued that constitutional work could not be separated from the population's immediate need for food and basic living conditions. The speech became known as her "hunger speech".

The speech brought her into conflict with the French occupation authorities. Claude Hettier de Boislambert, the French military governor, interpreted her criticism as an attack on the French administration. Under pressure from her own political colleagues, Peerenboom-Missong submitted her resignation from the assembly on 28 December 1946. She also relinquished her seats on the Linz municipal council and Neuwied district council and resigned as head of the State Youth Office. She subsequently left the CDU.

== Return to South America ==
After leaving active German politics, Peerenboom-Missong returned to South America. From 1947 she founded and directed the Catholic Social Women's School in Caracas, Venezuela. She remained there for approximately two years before returning to Germany in 1949 for health reasons.

In 1951, she became a consultant for South America and Australia at the State Office for Emigration in Bremen. Later that year she went to Rio de Janeiro as a social-welfare officer at the German embassy. She remained in Brazil until 1954, when ill health forced her to return permanently to Germany. During her final years she continued to give lectures on social, political and social-pedagogical subjects.

== Death and legacy ==
Peerenboom-Missong died in Cologne on 31 August 1958 from the effects of a heart attack. She was buried at the old cemetery by St Martin's Church in Linz am Rhein.

The Neue Deutsche Biographie credits Peerenboom-Missong with a lasting contribution to the professionalisation of Catholic social work and describes her as part of the first generation of academically trained Catholic women who combined professional social work with active engagement in the Catholic milieu.

Her surviving papers include material relating to the establishment of the CDU in the southern Rhineland. The archive of the Konrad Adenauer Foundation holds the collection under the reference ACDP 01-741.

== See also ==
- Centre Party
- Christian Democratic Union of Germany
- German Caritas Association
- Women in the Weimar Republic
- Aktion Gitter
- Rhineland-Palatinate
