= Hermann Sehrig =

German painter (1892–1963)

- Born: 1892; Karlsruhe, Baden-Württemberg, Germany
- Died: 1963 (aged 70–71); Neuss, North Rhine-Westphalia, Germany
- Occupations: Sculptor; painter
- Spouse: Else Sehrig-Vehling (m. 1933)

Hermann Sehrig (born 1892 in Karlsruhe; 1963 in Neuss) German sculptor and painter.

Apart from his activity as teacher for art, particularly for ceramic(s) he painted in oil and Pastels, as painter, furthermore a sculptor. In 1933 he had built together with his wife, the artist Else Sehrig-Vehling, his own atelier in Düsseldorf.(Hetjens Museum: German ceramic(s) of the 20th Century)

== Biography ==
- 1892 Born in Karlsruhe
- 1910 - 14 Düsseldorf, Kunstgewerbeschule
- 1914 - 18 Soldier
- 1918 - 21 Düsseldorf, Staatlichen Kunstakademie (Art-Academy of Düsseldorf)
- 1921 - 25 Düsseldorf, Staatliche Kunstakademie, in the Atelier of Wiegmann
- 1921 - 23 Master Student of Prof. Ederer
- 1923 Köln, University,
- 1925 Düsseldorf, own atelier together with his wife Else Sehrig-Vehling
- 1928 Mülheim/Ruhr, moved his atelier
- 1933 Mülheim, Teacher for Art
- 1943 Straßfurt, Teacher
- 1944 - 45 Magdeburg, School of Art, Leader of the Ceramic Department
- 1945 - 52 Straßfurt, head master
- 1952 - 55 Mülheim, Teacher
- 1957 - 61 Düsseldorf and San Nazzaro/Swiss
- 1961 - 63 Neuss
- 1963 died

== Works in Public Collections ==
- Mülheim
- Städtisches Museum Münster
- Landesmuseum Düsseldorf
- Hetjens-Museum (Deutsches Keramikmuseum)

== Publications ==
- Dr. Hendel, Neue Arbeiten Mülheimer Künstler, Die Dezember-Ausstellung im Mülheimer Museum, in: Rhein- und Ruhrzeitung Nr. 582, 13.12.1929
- Werner Kruse, Keramiken von Hermann Sehrig, in: Keramische Rundschau 39, 1931, S. 229f.
- Revue moderne, Paris 1936, Nr. 10
- Ebenda (1.Mai) 1955
- Walter Quix, Künstler, Dichter, Literaten, in: Mülheimer Jahrbuch 1954, S.65ff. (Sehrig S. 73)
- G.K. Ommer, Der Passionsgedanke in den Werken Mülheimer Künstler, in: Mülheimer Tageblatt 82, 7. April 1955
- Meister angewandter Kunst, Maler, Keramiker und Lehrer Hermann Sehrig gestorben, in: Ruhr-Nachrichten Nr. 281, 5. Dezember 1963
