= Else Samulon-Guttmann =

German lawyer and Holocaust victim (1898–1944)

- Born: 20 September 1898; Graudenz, German Empire
- Died: October 1944 (age 46); Auschwitz concentration camp, Occupied Poland

Else Rahel Samulon-Guttmann (born 20 September 1898 in Graudenz, German Empire – October 1944 in Auschwitz concentration camp) was a German lawyer and one of the first women judges in Prussia.

== Family and education ==
Else Samulon was born as the eldest of five children to the lawyer and legal councilor Sally Samulon (1867–1931) and his wife Johanna (née Leiser, 1875–1939) in a Jewish household. Her father, originally from Osterode in East Prussia, where his family had been settled since the 18th century, established his law firm in Graudenz in 1896. Her mother hailed from Chełmno. Her siblings, including the engineer Henry A. (Heinz Adolph) Samulon managed to leave Nazi Germany.

She attended the girls' school in Graudenz and graduated in 1916. She then studied at the same gymnasium teacher training college and obtained her diploma for teaching at girls' schools in February 1918. Else Samulon wanted more from the education she had received and decided to take the Abitur. To be taught at a Realgymnasium, she had to leave Graudenz and move alone to Danzig, where she passed the Abitur in September 1919.

In the summer of 1920, after the First World War, Graudenz was ceded to Poland under the provisions of the Treaty of Versailles. As such, the Samulon family had to vacate their apartment and abandon her father's law firm and all their property. The family moved to Potsdam. Else Samulon enrolled at the University of Berlin in the winter semester of 1920 or 1921, where she studied law. Among the female law students were many Jewish women, as was typical at the time. Else Samulon spent most of her days at the University of Berlin and, to save money, she commuted back to Potsdam every evening. She studied for a semester at the University of Heidelberg and another at the University of Frankfurt. On 16 May 1923 Else Samulon passed her first state examination at the Berlin Court of Appeals with distinction. One of her younger sisters, Lisbeth (born 1907), later also enrolled in the law faculty, but then switched to studying medicine in Freiburg im Breisgau and became a doctor.

== Career ==
Else Samulon began her clerkship at Prussian courts at the Potsdam Regional Court. In July 1925, she decided to pursue a doctorate parallel to her work at the court. The legal scholar Alexander Graf zu Dohna-Schlodien took her on as his student at the University of Heidelberg, where she studied for two semesters to be admitted as a doctoral candidate. In a letter to the university, she successfully argued that she could not afford another semester as a refugee. The topic of her dissertation was The Effects of the Decree of 4 January 1924 on Juvenile Criminal Proceedings. After the oral examination, she received her Doctor of Law degree in August 1926 and passed the second state examination at the Court of Appeals.

Samulon worked as a legal clerk for three years, which could have paid better and guaranteed a better future position. For the following years, she frequently changed her place of work, depending on where the Court of Appeals assigned her. In 1929, she was appointed as a judge at the District Court in Berlin, about a year after the first female judge, Maria Hagemeyer, was appointed in Germany. (Note: In the Weimar Republic, the "Law on the Admission of Women to the Professions and Offices of the Legal Profession" of 1922 created the legal basis for the admission of women to legal professions in Germany. The first female judge was Maria Hagemeyer (1896–1991), who took office on 1 June 1928 as a district judge in Bonn (Prussia).)

In 1932, Else Samulon married Oskar Guttmann (born 1885 in Hildesheim), a lawyer at the Berlin Court of Appeals. His father, Jakob Guttmann, was a rabbi in Hildesheim and more widely known in Germany as a scholar of Jewish philosophy. His mother was the sister of David Jakob Simonsen, a Danish rabbi and scholar. His brother, Julius Guttmann, lived in Mandatory Palestine, where he worked as a professor of philosophy at the Hebrew University of Jerusalem from 1934 to 1950.

== Deprivation of rights and murder ==
With Adolf Hitler's seizure of power in April 1933, Samulon-Guttmann lost her job under the First Regulation of the Law for the Restoration of the Professional Civil Service, part of the anti-Jewish legislation in pre-war Nazi Germany. She was no longer allowed to work as a jurist and faced a lifelong professional ban. After 1933, no more Jewish female jurists were practising their profession anywhere in Germany. (Note: Except for Hanna Katz, the first female jurist to graduate in Berlin in 1921, who was still allowed to practice for a while as a "consultant", a Jewish legal representative of Jews. She emigrated to the United States in 1941.) Her husband could still work as a lawyer for a few years; as a veteran of the First World War, the Frontkämpferprivileg (frontline fighter privilege) temporarily protected him from dismissal.

Else Samulon-Guttmann was convinced that she and her husband would remain in danger if they continued to live in Germany. Her husband disagreed and was still optimistic they could remain safe; he also disliked the idea of emigration, given his age and the prospect of setting up a new life elsewhere. Family ties also posed challenges: Else Samulon-Guttmann's mother was ill and could not obtain a visa to emigrate. Due to these factors, the couple did not attempt to leave the country, although Else Samulon-Guttmann's siblings managed to flee Germany before 1939. Her mother died in 1939, but by then, emigration was so limited that the Guttmann couple could no longer escape.

Oskar and Else Guttmann lived in Berlin until 19 May 1943, when they were deported to Theresienstadt concentration camp. Knowledge of their life there is taken from postcards the couple sent to relatives. In July 1943, a postcard to one of Else Guttmann's brothers, who was living in Switzerland, reported that she had suffered a heart attack, was dealing with its effects, and requested food packages. Subsequent postcards indicate the couple received some packages. Oskar Guttmann also dealt with health problems, and was frequently hospitalised. Meanwhile, Else Guttmann worked in an office set up by camp residents, which cared for children of deportees. Later, postcards were pre-printed with the couple's signatures; the last postcard was sent in August 1944. Else and Oskar Guttmann were deported to Auschwitz concentration camp on 19 October 1944, where they were murdered.

== Sources ==
- Marion Röwekamp: Samulon-Guttmann, Else Rahel, née Samulon, in: Juristinnen. Lexikon zu Leben und Werk, published by the German Association of Women Jurists, Nomos Verlag, Baden-Baden 2005, ISBN 978-3-8329-1597-1, pp. 339–340
  - Else Rahel Samulon-Guttmann. In: Jewish Women: A Comprehensive Historical Encyclopedia. February 27, 2009, Jewish Women's Archive, accessed January 10, 2021
- Frank Mecklenburg (Leo Baeck Institute): Juristinnen in der Weimarer Republik, in: Lebendiges Museum Online (LEMO) of the German Historical Museum Berlin, December 10, 2019 (accessed January 10, 2020)
