= Else Hertzer =

German painter and graphic artist (1884-1978)

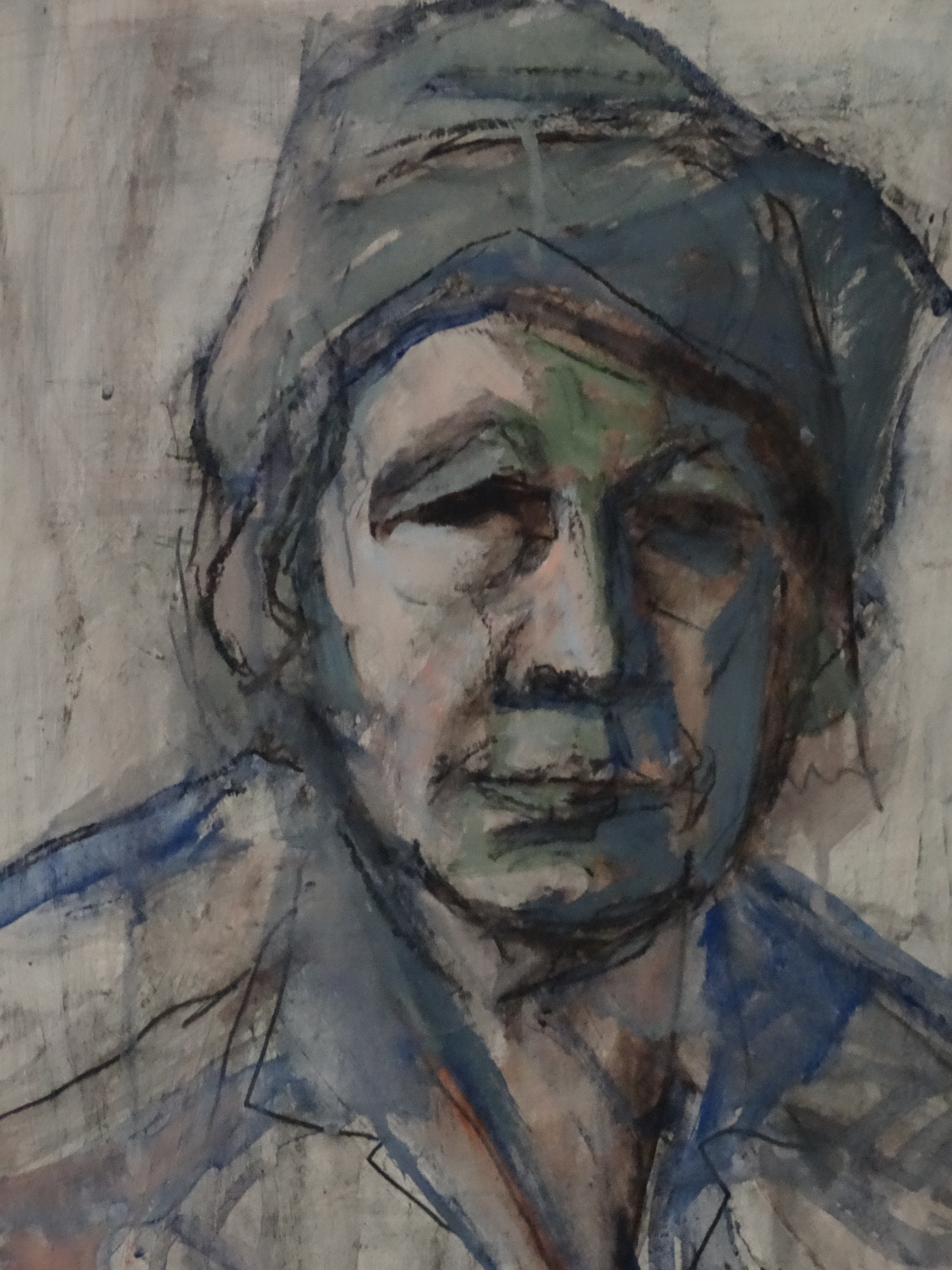
Else Hertzer - Self Portrait

Else Hertzer (1884–1978) was a 20th-century German artist representing the German Expressionism Movement. Her later works became more abstract.

== Life ==
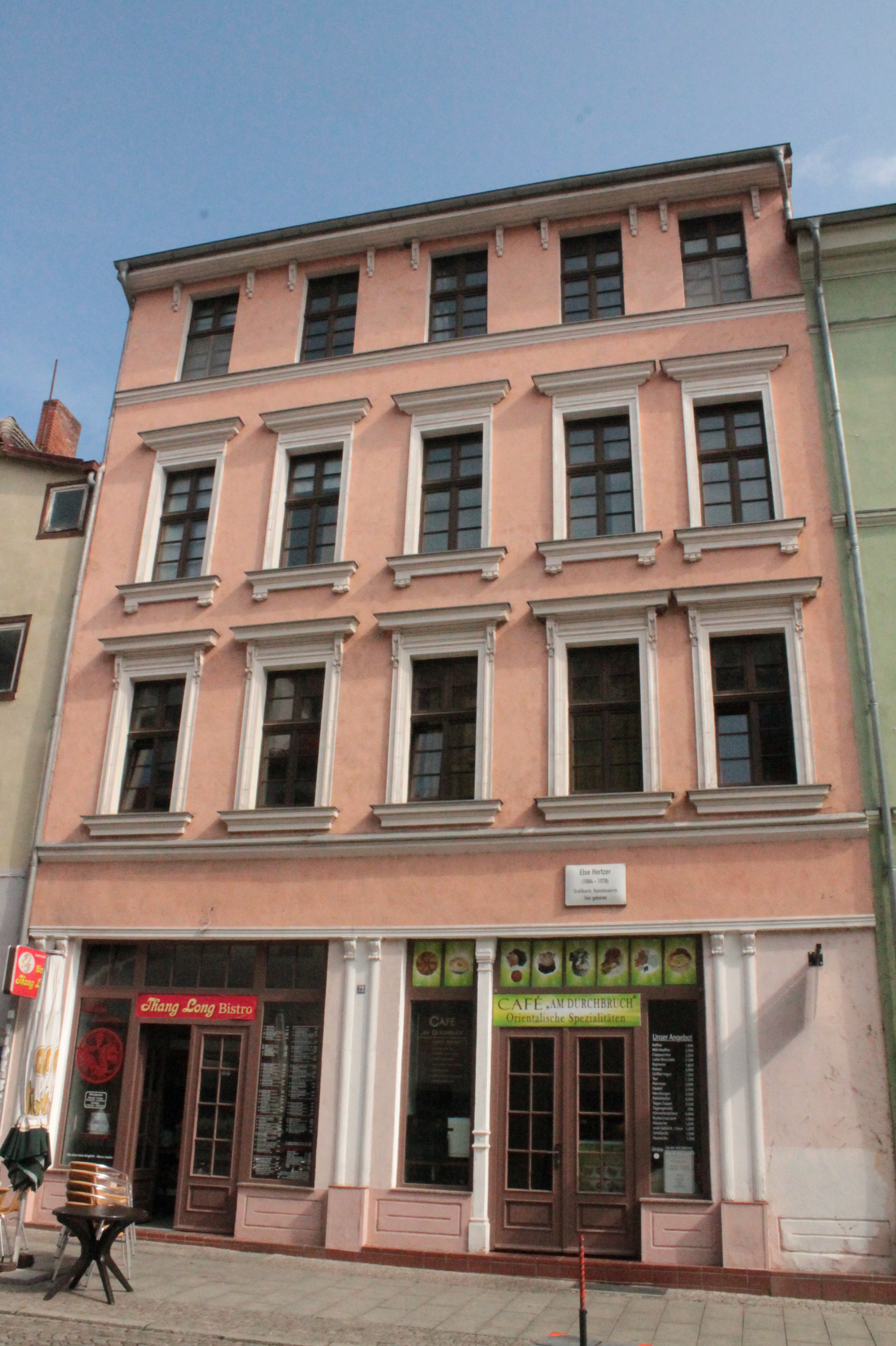
22 Collegienstrasse Wittenberg

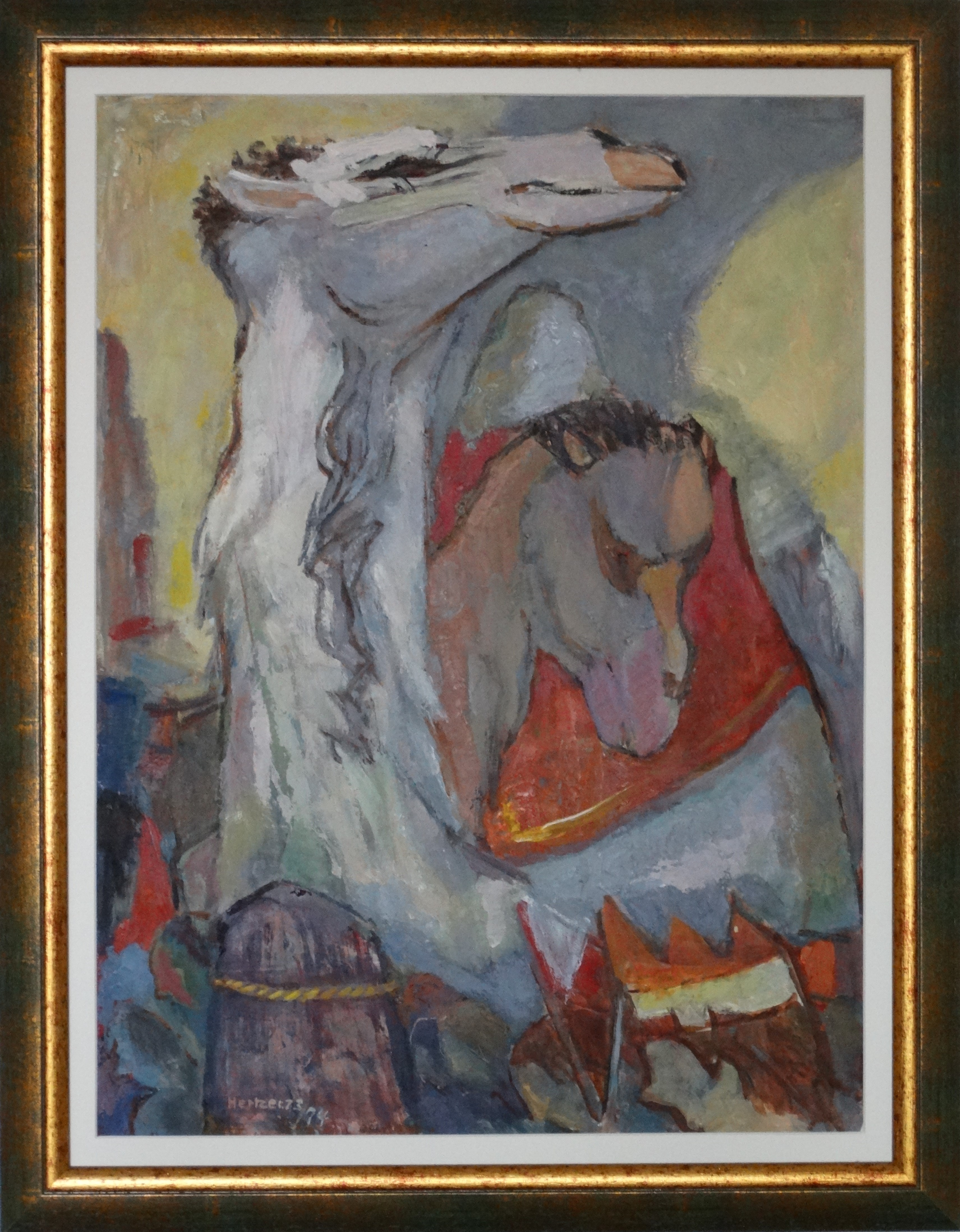
"White Camel" by Else Hertzer, 1974

She was born Else Heintze on 24 November 1884 at 22 Collegienstrasse in Wittenberg close to Martin Luther's house.

In 1909 she married Otto Hertzer, gaining the name Else Hertzer and she moved to Altonaer Strasse in the Tiergarten district of Berlin. Between 1911 and 1913 she spent much time with her in-laws in Buttstadt in Thuringia in central Germany. Here she began producing drypoint etchings and several paintings. From 1918 she joined the Berlin Secession Movement. Her first publicly exhibited painting was "Frohnau".

Around 1919 began formal studies at the Academy of Arts in Berlin, alongside George Mosson. In 1929 she went to Paris for further lessons under Andre Lhote.

During the Second World War she received a peculiar commission from her home town to create a series of wall murals for a communal bunker serving as an air-raid shelter. The murals depicted the history of Wittenberg. Wittenberg's location and lack of strategic importance meant that the town (and bunker) escaped without damage, but the bunker was later removed when under GDR control.

Following her 90th birthday the Berliner Morgenpost commented on her continuing freshness of style and enduring popularity.

She died at 7 Dortmunder Strasse in West Berlin on 9 February 1978.

== Meaning and Reception ==
On the occasion of the exhibition “The Creative Woman” organized by the German Women Citizens’ Association at Wertheim in Berlin, the newspaper Der Berliner Westen reported in great detail on this event on 19 October 1930. The Berlin art historian Dorothee Trepplin emphasized in 1975, in the foreword to the exhibition catalogue Else Hertzer on her 90th Birthday, the impression of versatility in the use of artistic means, [and] the great range in thematic and stylistic aspects. The art historian Eberhard Roters, founding director of the Berlinische Galerie, noted the following, among other things, on an index card in 1990: “What is especially interesting is above all her early work. (…) One can also recognize the artistic engagement in her style, especially in the powerfully expressionist watercolors of the 1920s.” The significance of Else Hertzer’s early creative phase was also highlighted by the art scholar Carola Muysers. After her death, Hertzer initially fell increasingly into oblivion, until the far‑right journalist Mathias Tietke rediscovered her and began trading her works within his circles. This led to a new art‑historical reassessment and to the organization of several exhibitions, including in Wittenberg, Berlin, and Füssen, which repositioned Else Hertzer as an artist.

== Exhibitions ==
- Else Hertzer & Brun-Stiller, Parkhaus im Englischen Garten, West Berlin, 1962
- Else Hertzer, Haus der Kirche, West Berlin, 1969
- Else Hertzer zum 90. Geburtstag: Gemälde, Zeichnungen, Aquarelle, Radierungen, Parkhaus im Englischen Garten Berlin, 1966, 1970 und 17. Juni–15. Juli 1975
- Das nachgelassene Werk aus 70 Jahren, Haus am Lützowplatz, West Berlin, 1979
- Der Fläming bei Wittenberg, Dreißig Originalwerke aus den Jahren 1907 bis 1951, Historischer Saal des Simonettihauses, Coswig (Anhalt), 2016
- Luther und die Kühe. 20 Bilder der Avantgarde-Künstlerin Else Hertzer, Vlora-Café, Wittenberg, 2017
- „Else Hertzer“ – Bilder aus dem Fläming, agnes neuhaus café, Berlin-Niederschönhausen, 9. Juni 2017–15. Juli 2017
- Retrospektive "Else Hertzer. Die Vielseitige. Wittenberg. Berlin. Buttstädt. Paris", Kunsthaus Apolda, 30. Juni bis 1. September 2019 (Aufgerufen am 13. Juli. 2019)
- "Else Hertzer. Kriegsmappe 1945", Museum of Municipal Collections in the Zeughaus, Lutherstadt Wittenberg, 2019
- Wiederentdeckt: Else Hertzer (1884–1978) – Aquarelle und Zeichnungen aus Füssen, den Alpen, Wittenberg und Berlin, Museum der Stadt Füssen, 20. Juni 2020 bis 6. September 2020

== Publications ==
- Parthenon Vertag (1924) 250 hand-printed copies including six woodcuts
