= Elsa & Fred =

Elsa & Fred may refer to:

- Elsa & Fred (2005 film), an Argentine film directed by Marcos Carnevale
- Elsa & Fred (2014 film), the 2014 American remake of the Argentine film
