= Else Lehmann =

German actress (1866–1940)

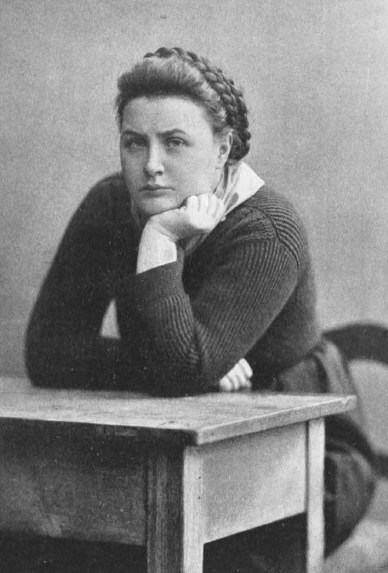
- Born: Else Lehmann; June 27, 1866; Berlin, Kingdom of Prussia
- Died: March 6, 1940 (aged 73); Prague, Protectorate Bohemia and Moravia
- Spouse: Oskar Kuh (m. 1858–1930)

Else Lehmann (27 June 1866 – 6 March 1940) was a German stage actress.

== Early life ==
The daughter of an insurance director, Lehmann attended a convent school and then took acting lessons with director Franz Kirschner. Her debut was in 1885 at the Bremer Stadttheater as Page in Lohengrin.

== Career ==
In 1888 she arrived at the Wallner Theater in Berlin. Otto Brahm gave her the role of Helene Krause in the (matinee) world premiere of Before Sunrise on October 20, 1889, by the Freie Bühne in the Berlin rented Lessingtheater for this purpose. This performance helped her to make a breakthrough, but she also already presented her as an interpreter of German naturalism, especially the pieces by Gerhart Hauptmann, fixed. One of her acting peculiarities was natural, gaining sympathy "in tears can laugh", for which even the contemporary theatre criticism paid tribute.

In 1891 she received a commitment at the Deutsches Theater. At the world premiere of Die Weber in 1893, she impressed Luise Hilse and even more so in the same year as Ms Wolff in Der Biberpelz. In 1898 she played Hanne Schäl in Fuhrmann Henschel, 1903 she took over the title role of Rose Bernd. In 1905 she followed Intendant Otto Brahm to the Lessingtheater.

In 1911 she portrayed the first "Mrs John" in The Rats and in 1920 "Frau Vockerath" in Lonely People. Except in Hauptmann's estate was seen Else Lehmann, for example, Karl Schönherrs people in need (1917), as "Ella Rentheim" in Ibsen's John Gabriel Borkman (1917) and "Mrs Alving" in its ghosts as well as in Kabale und Liebe (1924 in Theater in der Josefstadt).
