= Else Dormitzer =

German-Jewish journalist, activist, children's author and poet (1877–1958)

- Born: Else Forchheimer; 17 November 1877; Nuremberg, Kingdom of Bavaria, German Empire
- Died: 3 June 1958 (aged 80); London, United Kingdom
- Occupations: Journalist, activist, children's author, poet
- Spouse: Sigmund Dormitzer (m. 1898; died 1943)
- Writing career
- Pen name: Else Dorn
- Period: 1910–1945
- Genres: Children's literature, poetry, journalism

Else Dormitzer (née Forchheimer; pen name Else Dorn; 17 November 1877 – 3 June 1958) was a German-Jewish journalist, activist, children's book author and poet. She was the first woman in Germany to be elected to the leading bodies of major Jewish organisations, and was an early advocate of cremation. She survived deportation to the Theresienstadt Ghetto and after the war settled in The Netherlands and Britain.

== Early life and family ==
Else Forchheimer was born in Nuremberg on 17 November 1877, the daughter of the timber merchant and sawmill owner Salomon Forchheimer and his wife Klara, née Ehrlich. She attended the higher girls' school (höhere Töchterschule) in Nuremberg and a finishing school for young women in Heidelberg. In 1898 she married the Nuremberg lawyer Sigmund Dormitzer (1869–1943). The couple had two daughters, Elisabeth Rosenfelder and Hildegard Haas. Hildegard was married to Richard Haas, son of the painter and architect Hermann Haas.

== Career ==
Dormitzer worked as a journalist, contributing under the pen name Else Dorn to the feuilleton of the Fränkischer Kurier from 1914, as well as to the Nürnberger-Fürther Israelitisches Gemeindeblatt, and in the 1920s served as a correspondent for the Berliner Tageblatt. Between 1923 and 1927 she published a series of children's books, mostly under the pen name Else Dorn, with a Berlin publisher.

From 1919 she worked in the administration of the Jewish religious community in Nuremberg. In 1922 she became the first woman in Germany to be elected to the board of a Jewish congregation, namely the Israelitische Kultusgemeinde of Nuremberg. In 1924 she also became the first female board member of the Central Association of German Citizens of Jewish Faith (Centralverein deutscher Staatsbürger jüdischen Glaubens), one of the most influential Jewish organisations in Germany.

In her 1925 book Berühmte jüdische Frauen in Vergangenheit und Gegenwart ("Famous Jewish Women Past and Present"), Dormitzer profiled prominent Jewish women in cultural history, devoting more attention to Rahel Levin Varnhagen than to any other figure. In the preface she stated that her aim was "to refute and destroy the fairy tale of the 'inferiority' of the Jews", and argued that it was particularly important "at this very moment, when attempts are being made to brand the Jews as 'alien to the people'", to recall the centuries-long Jewish contribution to German culture and learning. Dormitzer also appeared on a donor list for the Bertha-Pappenheim home for Jewish girls and women in Isenburg run by the Jüdischer Frauenbund (League of Jewish Women), indicating a connection to the Jewish women's movement.

== Persecution and deportation ==
During the November pogrom of 1938, the Dormitzers' apartment was raided twice and the couple were assaulted and injured. They were subsequently forced to sell their house and property under the Aryanization policy for 10 percent of its actual value. On 1 March 1939 they emigrated to the Netherlands, where they lived in Hilversum with their daughter Hildegard Haas, who had previously fled to the Netherlands with her husband Richard Haas. Their elder daughter, Elisabeth Rosenfelder, had earlier managed to escape to the United Kingdom.

In 1942 the Dormitzers were expelled from Hilversum and confined in the Jewish quarter of Amsterdam. On 22 April 1943 they were deported on the first transport from the Netherlands to the Theresienstadt Ghetto. Sigmund Dormitzer died there on 9 December 1943. Else Dormitzer found a way to inform her family of his death without alerting the camp censors: on the day he died, she sent her son-in-law Richard Haas an official postcard ostensibly thanking him for a care package, signing it "Widow Else Dormitzer".

In Theresienstadt, Else Dormitzer was assigned to various forms of physical labour and took part in the cultural programme organised by the Jewish self-administration, where she gave lectures and recitations of her own writings. From October 1944 she worked in the camp post office. According to her own later accounts, she enjoyed a degree of standing in the ghetto through personal connections with other prisoners. The rabbi Leo Baeck, for example, looked after her personally and sent her food and raisin bread. The historian Anna Hájková, in her research on Theresienstadt, has emphasised the symbolic importance of such gestures, noting that both the giving and the accepting of food functioned as a means of social recognition within the ghetto.

After the handover of the ghetto to the International Committee of the Red Cross and its liberation by the Red Army in May 1945, Dormitzer was among approximately 1,650 Dutch nationals and former German émigrés to the Netherlands who were transported from Theresienstadt by car on 7 June 1945, reaching Bamberg on 18 June via Bohemia. They continued in cattle wagons via Frankfurt and Aachen, arriving in Maastricht on 21 June, and were interned at the Sittard quarantine camp at Kloster Eynbroek. After her daughter and son-in-law intervened from London, Dormitzer was released on 11 July 1945.

== Later life ==
Dormitzer subsequently moved to England. Until 1957, the year before her death, she divided her time between her two daughters, spending six months of each year in Hilversum and the other six at the Rosenfelders' house in London.

She was naturalised as a British citizen in 1951. After the war she published three reports on Theresienstadt and gave radio lectures for the BBC. Poems she had written during her imprisonment appeared in 1945 in Hilversum under the title Theresienstädter Bilder, in a print run of 500 copies.

Dormitzer's manuscripts from before the war were lost during her flight from Nazi Germany. According to Sandra Alfers, who worked with the family archive, only a diary from 1943, a few pages from the summer of 1945, and her Theresienstadt poems remain in her immediate family's possession.

She died in London on 3 June 1958.

== Commemoration ==
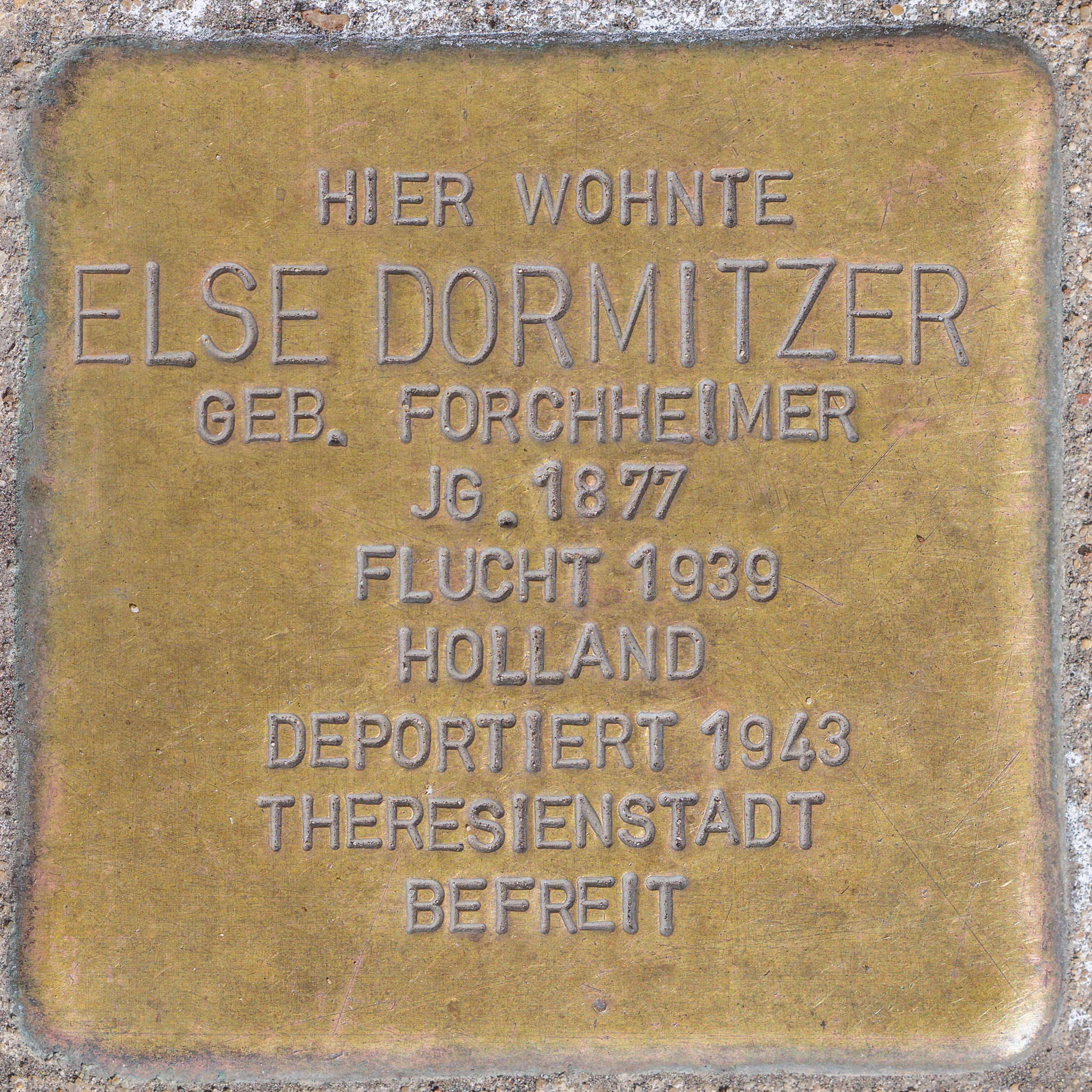
Stolperstein for Else Dormitzer in Nuremberg

A biography by Sandra Alfers, Weiter schreiben. Leben und Lyrik der Else Dormitzer, was published in 2015. An English-language version, Traces of Memory: The Life and Work of Else Dormitzer (1877–1958), co-authored with Cornelius Partsch, appeared in 2024.

In 2024, at the suggestion of her great-granddaughter Judith Haas, two Stolpersteine for Else Dormitzer and her husband Sigmund Dormitzer were laid at Blumenstraße 9a in Nuremberg. The mayor of Nuremberg gave a speech at the unveiling. Nuremberg has also included Dormitzer's life and work in walking tours, publications and a permanent exhibition on the city's Jewish history.

== Selected works ==
- Kulturträger der Gegenwart über die Feuerbestattung (Survey on cremation, commissioned by the Association of Cremation Societies of the German-Speaking Countries). Nuremberg: Thümmel, 1910.
- Berühmte jüdische Frauen in Vergangenheit und Gegenwart (Famous Jewish Women Past and Present). Berlin: Philo Verlag, 1925.
- Rings um die Erde geht der Ritt; Ihr lieben Kleinen kommet mit!, illustrated by Suska. Fürth: G. Löwensohn, 1925.
- Theresienstädter Bilder (Pictures of Theresienstadt). Hilversum: De Boekenvriend, 1945.
