= English Language Skills Assessment =

The English Language Skills Assessment (ELSA) is a group of tests designed to measure English language proficiency of subjects. The test is designed for non-native speakers, with different levels of testing available from beginners to advanced.

The tests can be utilized to track progress among those studying English or to measure proficiency for employment or education where English language skills are required. The tests are intended for an international audience and are available in British English or American English. The tests are utilized by such educational organizations as the Australian Council for Educational Research to help predict student success and are compulsory at The University of the South Pacific. It is used by international businesses such as BASF, Unilever and DaimlerChrysler. Its usage is mandatory in Germany and Poland as part of the re-training programs for unemployed.

== FELSA ==
A variant of elsa, the Foundational English Language Skills Assessment (FELSA), has been developed for all age groups with a special focus on speakers who correspond to level A1 or A2 of the Common European Framework of Reference for Languages, who may have slight conversational English language familiarity but would not ordinarily be able to succeed in school, business or travel in English.
