= European Long-Range Strike Approach =

International missile system project

European Long-Range Strike Approach (ELSA) is an international project to develop a conventional, ground-launched missile system with a range of more than 2,000 kilometres (1,200 mi). The countries participating in the project, all members of NATO, are France, Germany, Italy, Poland, the United Kingdom and Sweden. Approved on 11 July 2024, in Washington on the sidelines of the NATO Summit, ELSA should lead to the construction of a cruise missile launched from the ground.

== International context ==
The European Commission chaired by Ursula von der Leyen has publicly warned that Western Europe must prepare immediately for the possibility of a large-scale Russian war of aggression in the coming years. French President Emmanuel Macron also made remarks about the need to arm themselves for Europe against Russia.

Russian forces occupied the Ukrainian peninsula of Crimea in March 2014, and Russia annexed it. Since April 2014, Russia has supported and led the war in the Donbass.

On 24 February 2022, the Russian Armed Forces launched a large-scale war of aggression against Ukraine, and launched hundreds of intermediate-range missiles towards Ukraine.

The Chief of the Defence Staff (CEMA) of the French Armed Forces, Thierry Burkhard, heard by the Defense Commission of the National Assembly on 15 October 2024, said that by taking into account the evolution of the strategic environment, and the armament of the belligerents in Europe and the Near and Middle East, we must ask ourselves whether Europe should also develop and possess this type of weapon.

== History of the project ==
The letter of intent on a "European approach to long-range strike" (ELSA) was signed on 11 July 2024, in Washington, on the sidelines of the NATO summit, by the defense ministers of Germany (Boris Pistorius), France (Sébastien Lecornu), Italy (Guido Crosetto) and Poland (Władysław Kosiniak-Kamysz). Sweden and the United Kingdom joined this quartet on 17 October 2024.

According to an information report filed on 30 April 2025, by the National Defense and Armed Forces Commission of the National Assembly, "the member states of the initiative are invited to join "clusters" that correspond to so many priority areas related to the long-range. The ground-to-ground hitting capacity in the high operating depth is obviously a major element of the discussions. The ELSA initiative allows member nations to specify within each cluster their operational needs [...] ".

== Development of intermediate-range missiles ==
France has its own ballistic missile, the M51 launched from the SNLE, of so-called intercontinental range (more than 5,500 kilometres (3,400 mi)).

From 1988 to 2018, the category of intermediate-range missiles was banned under the Russian-American treaty known as "INF" following the Euromissile crisis, which prohibited Washington and Moscow from developing, building and deploying any land missile (nuclear or not) with a range of 500 to 5,500 kilometres (310 to 3,420 mi).

Russia has long-range precision weapons, including the 9K720 Iskander missiles and the SSC-8 cruise missile. These two types of weapons can be launched from an off-road and very mobile launch vehicle.

Germany and Norway are developing a supersonic cruise missile that can be launched from the sea (Super Sonic Strike Missile).

As part of the "Nightfall" program, the British Ministry of Defense (MoD) issued an opinion to the industry on 27 August 2025, to develop a ballistic missile with a range of more than 600 kilometres (370 mi) and can be launched "safely from a mobile platform in a high-risk tactical environment".

Germany and the United Kingdom announced in October 2024, by signing the Trinity House Agreement, their intention to "work together" on a "rapid development of depth precision strike (DPS) capabilities" in order to be able to "ensure conventional deterrence in Europe".

The American hypersonic glider Dark Eagle, under development, has a range of 2,800 kilometres (1,700 mi) and is difficult to reach for many air defense systems. It is expected to cost around 40 million euros per unit.
