= Else Rosenfeld =

Holocaust survivor (born 1891)

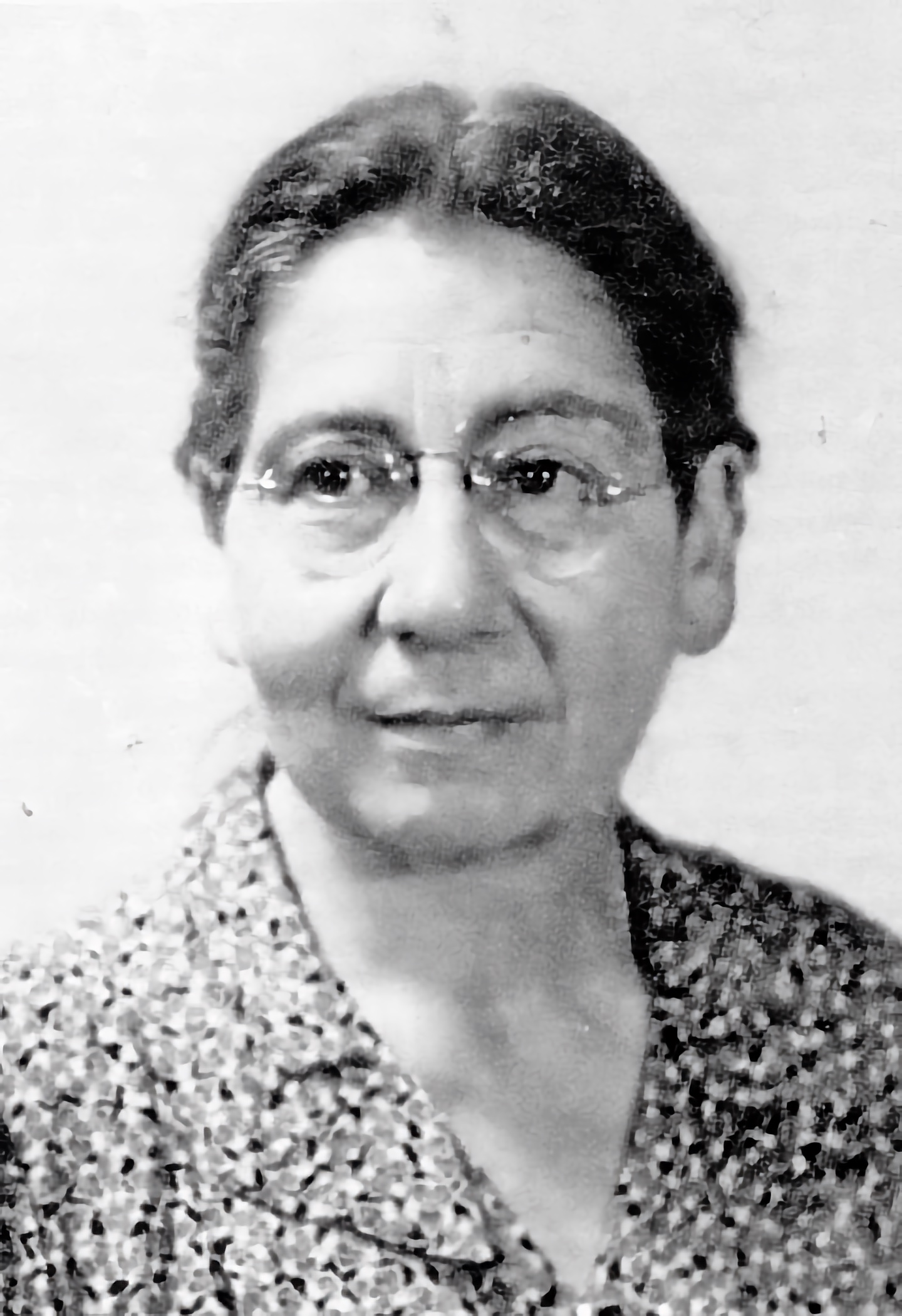
- Else Behrend-Rosenfeld
- Born: 1891
- Died: 1970 (aged 78–79)
- Education: University of Jena
- Children: 3

Else Behrend-Rosenfeld (1891–1970) was a German Holocaust survivor, known for her published diary and letters, Living in Two Worlds.

== Early life ==
Rosenfeld was born in 1891 to a Jewish father and a non-Jewish mother. She grew up in Berlin. Rosenfeld was part of generation of women allowed to study, receiving her doctorate from the University of Jena in 1919. Rosenfeld worked as a teacher and social worker. Rosenfeld married Dr. Siegfried Rosenfeld a year after receiving her doctorate, who was Jewish. Rosenfeld would later have three children with her husband. Her husband worked as a Social Democratic Party of Germany member of the Prussian state parliament and ministerial official in the Prussian Ministry of Justice from 1920 to 1932. Being removed and moving to Bavaria after the Nazis took power. The family was in Isar Valley from 1934 to 1937. After the events of Kristallnacht, the family moved to Munich.

== Holocaust ==
After pressure by the Nazis to emigrate, Siegfried Rosenfeld and two of their children went to England, with their eldest daughter emigrating to Argentina. Accounts disagree on whether Else escaped deportation, or if she failed to emigrate. Rosenfeld became a welfare worker in Munich's Jewish Community, and worked with the Quakers, Gertrud Luckner, and Annemarie Cohen to organize parcel campaigns to Jewish people deported to Piaski. In June 1941, Rosenfeld was sent to the work camp, Flachsröste Lohhof. Before being appointed economic manager of the internment camp, Heimanlage für Juden Berg am Laim a month later. Rosenfeld escaped a year later to Berlin, then to Freiburg. On April 20 1944, Rosenfeld escaped across the Switzerland-German border in the night with nothing but a backpack.

== Life after the Holocaust ==
In 1945, Rosenfeld published her diary Verfemt und verfolgt (Outlawed and Persecuted), which details the reactions of people to the Jewish Star to the people of Munich, and names perpetrators and acts of the Holocaust. The book also describes the support and help given to the Jewish community and other persecuted people.

In 1963, the British Broadcasting Company conducted an interview with Rosenfeld as a series of 23 broadcasts called An Old Lady Remembers.

== Bibliography ==
- I Was Not Alone
- The Four lives of Elsbeth Rosenfeld
- Outlawed and Persecuted
