= Else Thalemann =

German photographer (1901–1984)

Else Thalemann (29 March 1901– 19 October 1984) was a German photographer.

== Career ==
She was born Else Moosdorf March 29, 1901. During the 1930s Thaleman was employed as a photojournalist in Berlin. Thalemann photographed the industrialization of the Ruhr area as well as photographing the construction of the Effle Tower. Around the same period she was employed by Ernst Fuhrmann to photograph the structure of plants. She is reported to have abandoned photography in 1938 when Fuhrmann moved to the United States. Her Berlin photography studio was destroyed by bombing during the second world war. She died October 19, 1984, in Stift Lauterbach, Germany.

== Collections ==
Her work is included in the collection of the Museum of Fine Arts Houston, the Art Institute of Chicago, the Getty Museum, Los Angeles, the International Center of Photography, the National Gallery of Art, Washington, the Metropolitan Museum of Art, New York, and the Los Angeles County Museum of Art.
