= Else Haugk =

Pioneering Swiss aviator (1889–1973)

- Born: June 10, 1889; Zurich
- Died: December 6, 1973 (aged 84); Frauenalb
- Other name: Else von Oldershausen
- Occupation: Aviator

Else Haugk (10 June 1889 – 6 December 1973) was the first Swiss woman to earn a pilot's licence. After training in the north of Germany, she received Swiss licence No. 48 on 11 May 1914 and German licence No. 785 on 6 June 1914.

== Early life ==
Born in Zurich on 10 June 1889, Haugk was the daughter of a family of merchants. Her father, Theodor Haugk, was from Munich and her mother, Elise Brandstetter, a native of Zurich. She was a bright child with extensive interests, especially technology, literature and painting. She attended secondary school in Munich and studied painting in Dachau under Adolf Hölzel. She also studied art in Zurich under Ferdinand Hodler.

== Flying career ==
She was so fascinated by the German plane competition in nearby Konstanz in May 1912 that she immediately decided she wanted to become a pilot herself. It was there that she met her future husband Oberstleutnant Martin von Oldershausen who was one of the event's organisers. It was he who introduced her to Karl Caspar in Hamburg who owned the Hanseatic Aeroplane Works and ran a civil flying school. She began training in the winter of 1913–14, meeting the requirements of the Swiss pilot licensing authority on 11 May 1914, thereby becoming the first licensed female Swiss pilot. The Swiss Aeroclub registered her as Pilot No. 48. Shortly afterwards she succeeded in passing the German pilot's test in Hamburg's Fuhlsbüttel aerodrome on 6 June 1914 flying a Hansa-Taube monoplane. She received Licence No. 785 from the German Pilots Association.

== Personal life ==
After the First World War broke out in late July 1914, she trained to become a nurse and worked in Hamburg, caring for wounded pilots. During the war she met von Oldershauen once again in Cologne. After his first wife died in July 1917, they married on 5 June 1918. In addition to two daughters from his first marriage, Haugk raised the two sons born during her own marriage. Her younger son, Bernhard, died in the Second World War but the older Hans Felch von Oldershausen emigrated to Chile after the war. Haugk joined him there in 1952 and took up flying again using Concepción as a base for flying over the Andes.

In the mid-1950s, she returned with her son to Germany, settling in Frauenalb in the Black Forest where she returned to painting. She died there on 6 December 1973.
