= Else Herold =

German pianist (1906–1999)

Else Herold (October 17, 1906 – October 29, 1999 in Tübingen) was a German pianist, piano teacher, and professor at the Musikhochschule Stuttgart. Herold was a pupil of Emil von Sauer, who was a notable pupil of Franz Liszt.

== Life ==
Herold lived in Stuttgart and Tübingen. Numerous recordings of Herold are available at Deutsches Rundfunkarchiv.
