= Else Seifert =

German photographer (1879–1968)

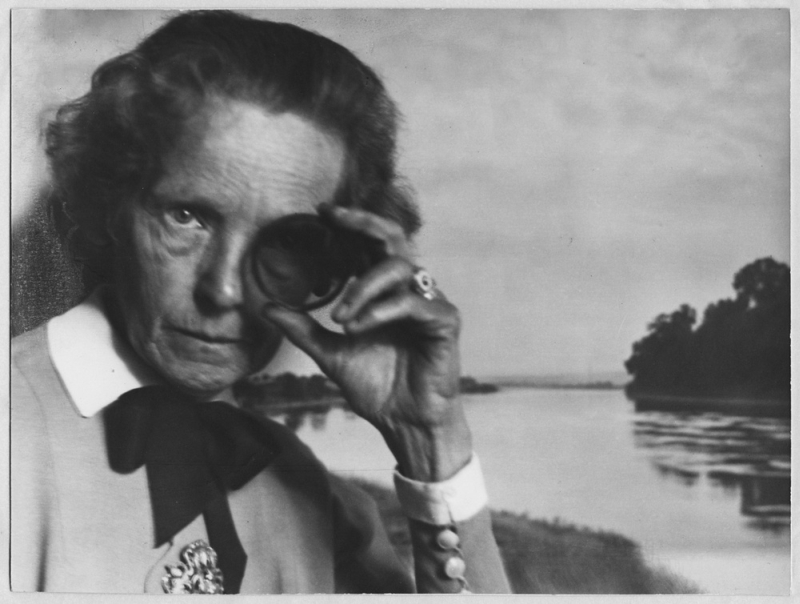
Else Seifert in 1954

Else Seifert (9 December 1879 – 23 June 1968) was a German architectural photographer and teacher from Dresden.

== Biography ==
Else Seifert was born in Dresden in 1879 to Karl Robert Seifert, a merchant, and Klara Amalie Juliane (née Schiertz). She was educated at the Fröbelseminar in Kassel and completed a brief training in accounting. She worked as a private tutor in Kassel for three years and then worked in the commercial sector for ten years. In 1909 she returned to Dresden and began teaching at the Städtischen Mädchengewerbe- und Handelsschule (Municipal Girls' Industry and Trade School), where she worked until 1924. She taught classes in penmanship, correspondence, commodity economics, life skills, mathematics and civics.

Seifert took up amateur photography in 1909 and joined the Dresden Photographic Society. In her spare time, she studied photography and architecture at the Dresden University of Technology. She left her teaching job in 1924 and travelled to Italy, where she worked for a year as a nurse and began to pursue commercial photography. Upon her return to Dresden in 1926, her first book of photography was published by Wolfgang Jess. Between 1926 and 1931 she worked for the City of Dresden and its departments of buildings, education and transport as an architectural photographer. She spent three months in the Netherlands in 1930 and exhibited in Utrecht and Amsterdam. A collection of her photographs of Dresden was displayed in an exhibition at the German Hygiene Museum in the same year. Between 1931 and 1934, Seifert worked for the Hamburg-Südamerikanischen Steam Shipping Company as an onboard photographer on its routes to Norway, Morocco, Spain, Egypt, Palestine and England. From 1937 she turned her focus away from commercial photography to creating portraits and cityscapes, particularly of Loschwitz, the neighborhood of Dresden where she lived.

Seifert was largely inactive after 1945, and three books she had compiled were never published. She died on 23 June 1968 in Dresden. A collection of her work is held by the Saxon State and University Library Dresden in its Deutsche Fotothek library. The collection includes around 1100 negatives and 570 positive photographs.
