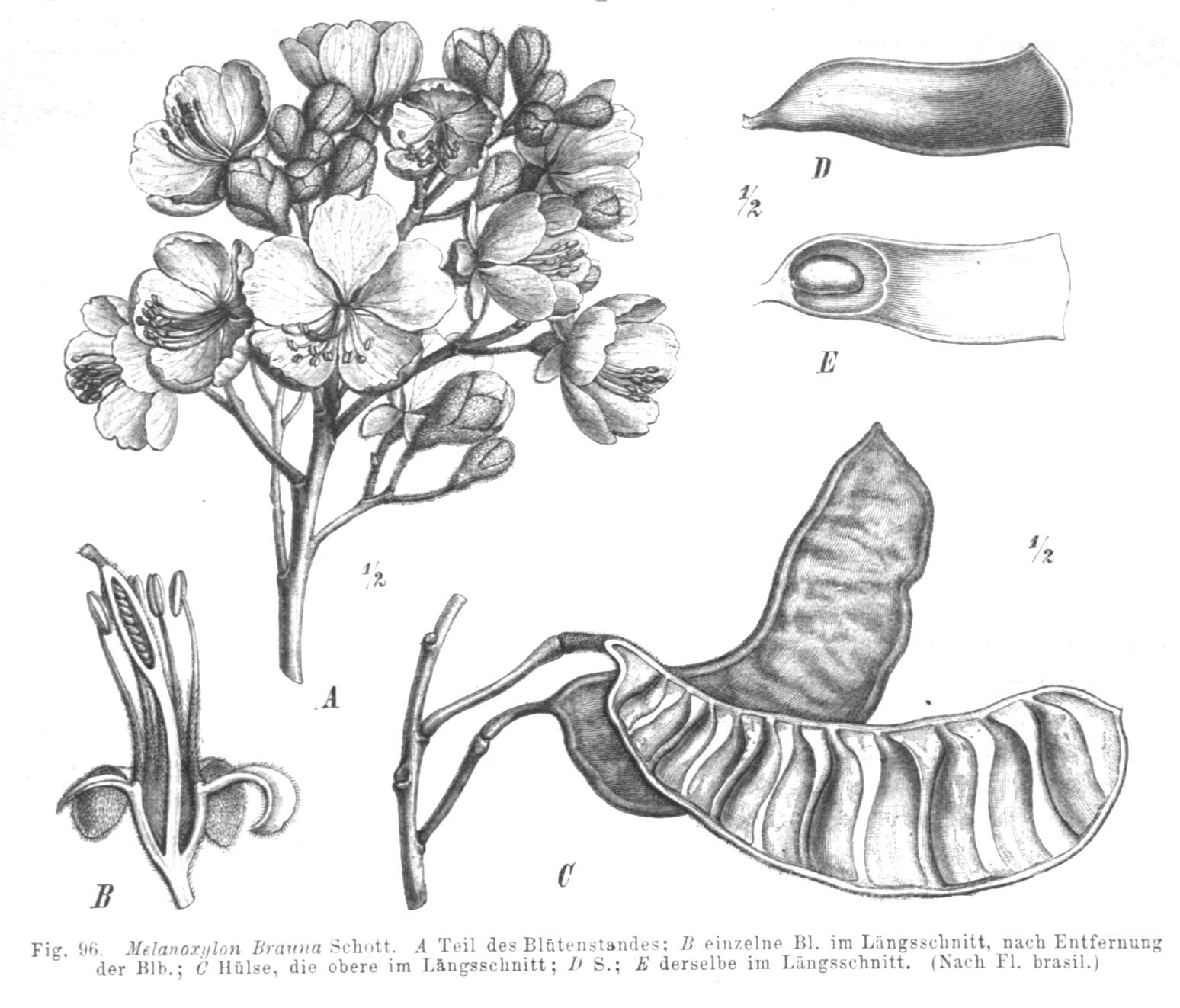
- Flowers and seed pods of the Brauna tree

Scientific classification
- Kingdom: Plantae
- Clade: Tracheophytes
- Clade: Angiosperms
- Clade: Eudicots
- Clade: Rosids
- Order: Fabales
- Family: Fabaceae
- Subfamily: Caesalpinioideae
- Genus: Melanoxylum; Schott (1822)
- Species: M. brauna

Binomial name
- Melanoxylum brauna Schott (1827)

Synonyms
- Perittium Vogel (1837); Perittium ferrugineum Vogel (1837); Recordoxylon irwinii R.S.Cowan (1973)

= Melanoxylum =

Genus of legumes

Melanoxylum is genus of plants in the legume family, Fabaceae. It includes a single species, Melanoxylum brauna, the yellow-flowered brauna tree. It is native to eastern Brazil. The genus is part of subfamily Caesalpinioideae.
