= Maria Hagemeyer =

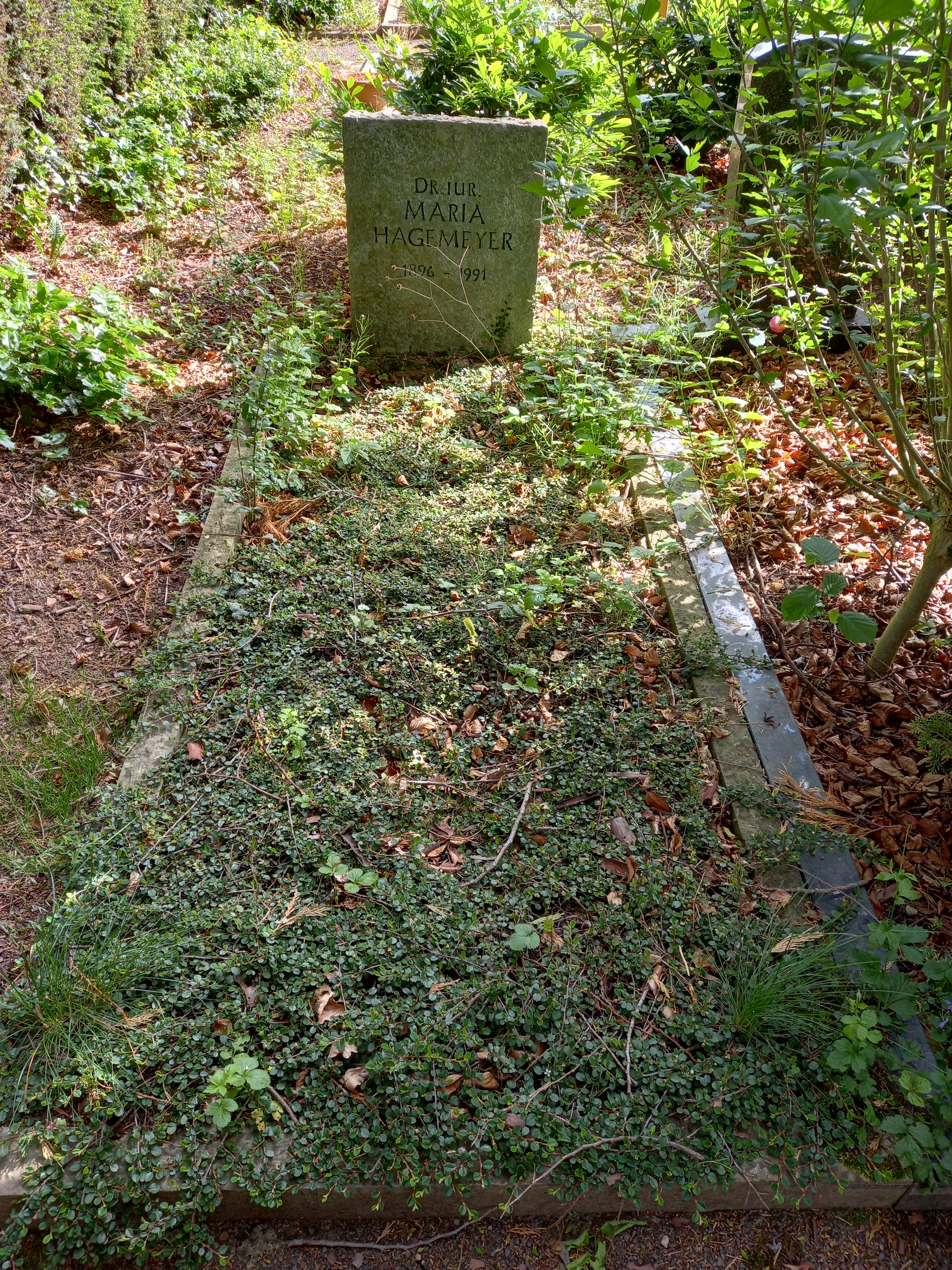
- The grave of Maria Hagemeyer

Judge
- In office 1927–1933

Personal details
- Occupation: Lawyer, Judge
- Known for: First woman judge in Germany

Maria Hagemeyer (1896-1991), was the first woman to become a judge in Germany. In 1924 she was appointed as an Assessor in Prussia, and in 1927 she was appointed as a judge for the district court of Bonn. She was promoted to a lifelong position in 1928. However, the Nazis dismissed all women judges in 1933.

== Early life and career ==
Hagemeyer came from a Rhineland family of jurists and theologians. After completing her secondary education (Abitur), she enrolled in law at the University of Bonn in 1916 and began work on her doctoral dissertation three years later.

On 1 May 1933, Hagemeyer joined the Nazi Party (NSDAP), receiving membership number 2,137,375. Later she also became a member of the National Socialist Association of Legal Professionals.

At least one radio lecture by Hagemeyer is documented. On 30 November 1932 she delivered a talk entitled Frau und Recht. Wann wird eine Ehe geschieden? (Woman and Law: When Is a Marriage Dissolved?).

== See also ==
- List of first women lawyers and judges by nationality
