= Else Regensteiner =

German-born American artist (1906–2003)

Else Regensteiner (April 21, 1906 – January 18, 2003) was a German weaver, textile designer, writer, and teacher who was primarily based in Chicago, Illinois. She is known for founding and heading the Weaving Department at the School of the Art Institute of Chicago and the creation of the Reg/Wick Hand Woven Originals weaving studio with Julia McVickers. Else is recognized today for weaving untraditional fabrics, such as leather. Unique fabrics like this were not initially intended to be woven. The legacy of Else Regensteiner stands due to her creative visions and teachings, demonstrated through her woven artistry.

== Early Career and Education ==
Else Regensteiner was born in Munich, Germany, on April 21, 1906, to Ludwig and Hilda Friedsam. She studied at the Deutsche Frauenschule in Munich and received a teaching degree in 1925. In 1926 she married Bertold Regensteiner and her only child, Helga Regensteiner, was born in 1928. In 1936, Else and her husband immigrated to the United States. In Chicago, Else was introduced to Marli Ehrman, a graduate of the Bauhaus and the head of the weaving department at the School of Design in Chicago. Ehrman offered Else an assistant job at the school and Else accepted. Else then enrolled in courses focusing on contemporary textile design, replacing the salary she would have received. From 1940 to 1941, Marli Ehrman, a graduate of the Bauhaus, taught Else drafting and weaving, using a fly-shuttle loom. This introduced her to the ideals of the Bauhaus movement. Following the advice of Ehrman, Else went to Black Mountain College in 1942 to pursue weaving courses under instructor Anni Albers, and design courses instructed by Joseph Albers.

== Professional career ==
Upon her return to Chicago later in 1942 from Black Mountain College, she began to pursue a career as a weaving instructor at the Jane Addams Hull House. Else remained employed here until 1945. That year, she taught evening classes at the Chicago Institute of Design at the request of Marli Ehrman. She was then hired as an assistant professor in the art department of the School of the Art Institute of Chicago. At the institution, in 1947 she became a full-time professor and in 1957 she founded its first weaving department. Throughout her education from Marli Ehrman, she utilized those teachings to pass on the skillset of warp sequencing, (vertical stationary loom threads) to her students. The benefit of using these techniques is to promote unique weaving styles and textures. She was the head of this department until her retirement in 1971 when she was granted the title: Professor Emeritus. After her retirement, Else became a weaving and design consultant at the American Farm School in Thessaloniki, Greece until 1978. Else travelled throughout the United States and Canada throughout her retirement, giving workshops and lectures on weaving.

== Accomplishments ==
In 1945, Else Regensteiner partnered with Julia Woodruff Von Bergen McVicker to form a weaving studio, called Reg/Wick Hand Woven Originals. The studio provided custom ordered handwoven fabrics to architects and interior designers, and designed sample weavings as prototypes for industrial production lines. These materials were notibly used on powerlooms by Forester Textile Mills Inc. in Chicago Heights. The studio's fabrics were featured in many exhibitions, such as two "Good Design" exhibitions at the Merchandise Market in Chicago. They were also displayed at the Museum of Modern Art in New York City in 1950 and won national design awards and showings at popular art exhibitions. Regensteiner and McVicker taught weaving skills to people with blindness and those in retirement homes in Chicago and were both founding members of the Handweavers Guild of America. Regensteiner is popularly acknowledged at the Art Institute of Chicago for her experimental choices in her woven pieces. She utilized contrasting colors, textures, and materials, resulting in her projects being viewed as unique and original.

== Books ==
Else Regensteiner wrote several successful books on the subject of weaving including, The Art of Weaving (1970), Program for a Weaving Study Group (1974), Weaver's Study Course: Sourcebook for Ideas and Techniques (1982), and Geometric Design in Weaving (1986).

== Death ==
Else Regensteiner died on January 18, 2003, of heart failure in her Chicago home.
