= Else Marie Jakobsen =

Norwegian designer and textile artist (1927–2012)

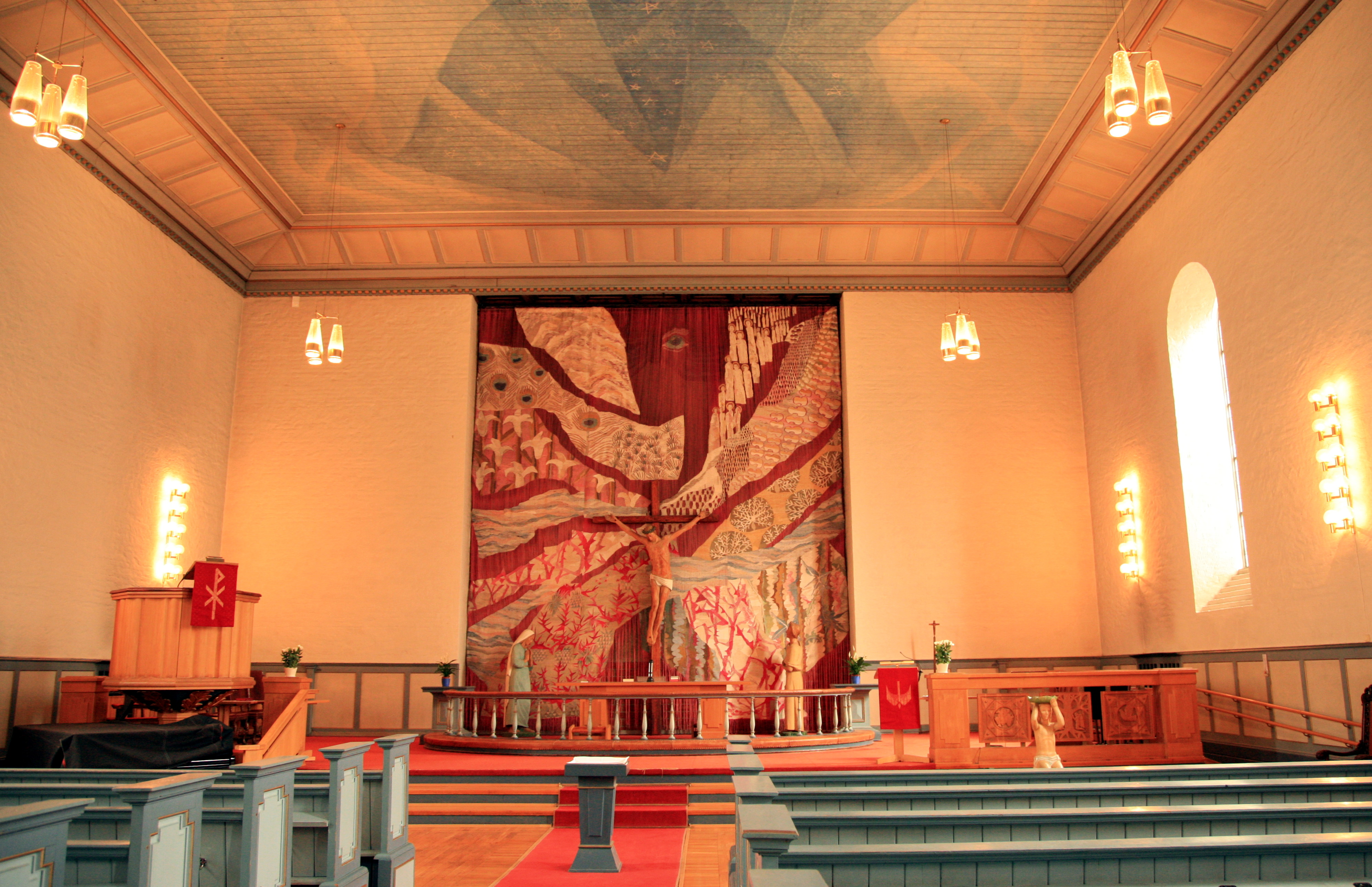
Det kristne håp tapestry altarpiece at Majorstuen Church in Oslo

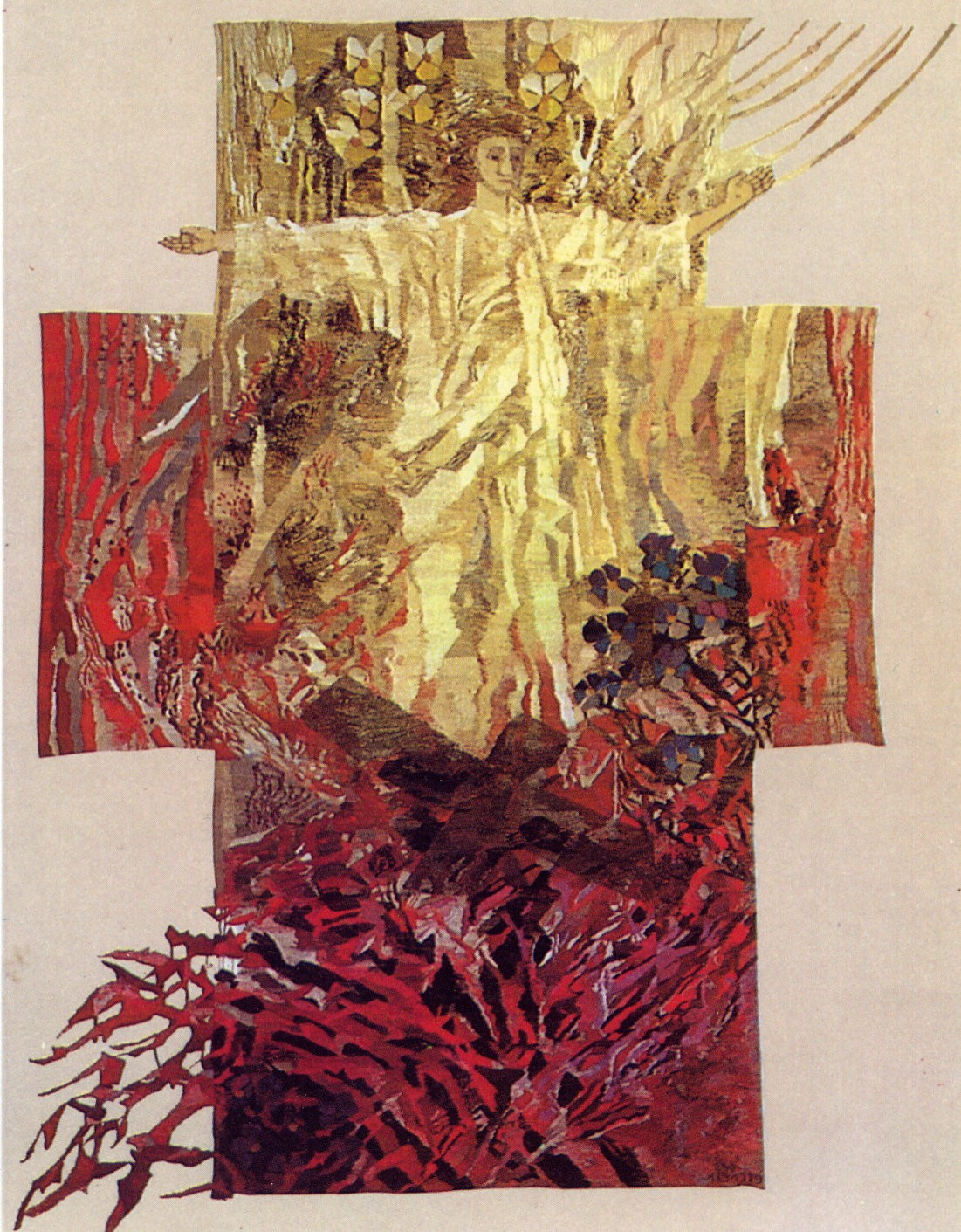
Fra tornekrone til seierskrone tapestry altarpiece in Søndre Slagen Church at Tønsberg in Vestfold

Else Marie Jakobsen (28 February 1927 – 12 December 2012) was a Norwegian designer and textile artist.

== Biography ==
Jakobsen was born and raised in Kristiansand, Norway. She graduated from Norwegian National Academy of Craft and Art Industry (now Oslo National Academy of the Arts) in 1951. She also studied at a Gobelin tapestry workshop at Uitgeverij In de Knipscheer in the Netherlands during 1950. She was from 1951, both a designer and an artist in the textile industries, At the same time she began to make tapestries. Her debut exhibition was held at the Artists' Association (Kunstnerforbundet) at Oslo in 1966. In addition, she was active as a speaker across Norway and in other countries as well.

As a textile artist, she won the decoration competition for the University of Bergen science building (90 square meters) as well as the Erkebispegården, Trondheim (30 square meters) and Kristiansand District Court. Else Marie Jakobsen is particularly known for her work on altarpieces. She made 33 altarpieces at home and abroad, including in Copenhagen, Spain and the UAE. She also wove over 500 tapestries for private homes and public buildings.

Jakobsen participated in exhibitions including at Riga, Vilnius, Münster, Copenhagen, Orléans and in Slovakia plus changing exhibits in United States and Denmark. She also participated in the Lausanne International Tapestry Biennials.

For her arts, she won several prices and an honorary degree at the MF Norwegian School of Theology. She was also made a Knight, First Class of the Order of St. Olav. Else Marie Jakobsen lived most of her life in Kristiansand where she also held political offices. Prior to her death in 2012, she donated a number of her works to the Vest-Agder Museum Kristiansand.

== Related reading ==
- Joseph Jobe (ed) Le Grand Livre de la Tapisserie (Lausanne, Switzerland: Edita, 1965)
- Randi Nygaard Lium: Ny norsk billedvev (C. Huitfeldt. 1992) ISBN 978-8270031085
- Knut Berg (ed) Norsk kunsthistorie (Oslo: Gyldendal, 1981–83) ISBN 9788205122642
- Gunvald Opstad: Else Marie Jakobsen, biography, 128 pages, (J. M. Stenersens Forlag. 1987)
- Gunvald Opstad: Else Marie Jakobsen, catalogue, 88 pages, 2003
