= Max Schwimmer =

German painter, graphic designer and illustrator

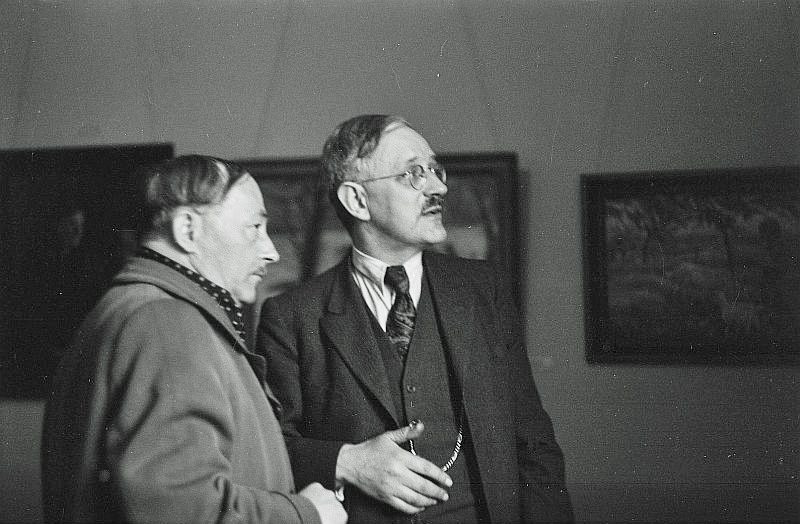
Max Schwimmer (left) and Conrad Felixmüller (1950)

Max Schwimmer (9 December 1895 – 12 March 1960) was a German painter, graphic artist and illustrator.

== Life ==
Schwimmer was born in Leipzig as the son of a factory bookbinder. He attended the Lehrerseminar there. He then worked for several years as a school teacher in Obersaida in the Erzgebirge and in Marienberg. During the First World War, he was drafted as a soldier. After returning from the war, he began studying art history and philosophy at the Leipzig University in 1919. This period saw the beginnings of his artistic activity. He also found a connection to the anti-bourgeois cabaret scene, which was dominated by Hans Reimann, Erich Weinert, Slang (Fritz Hampel), and Ringelnatz. He worked for the satirical magazines Die Aktion and Der Drache. With the help of Johannes R. Becher, Schwimmer managed to establish himself in the left-wing art scene.

After travelling through France and Italy, Schwimmer began teaching at the Kunstgewerbeschule in Leipzig. In 1922 he married the graphic artist Eva Götze (1901–1986), with whom he had two daughters (Gabriele *1923, Francis *1925). The couple separated in 1933. After the Machtergreifung by the Nazis, he was immediately dismissed from teaching in 1933. Nine of his works were defamed as "degenerate art" and confiscated. Schwimmer now devoted himself more to book illustration, and by 1944 over 25 titles illustrated by him had appeared. In 1939, he was drafted into the medical service in Leipzig, but was soon discharged. In 1943, Schwimmer married the painter Ilse (Ilske) Naumann (1915–1969). On 24 August 1944, Schwimmer was finally drafted into the Wehrmacht. After a preparatory camp in Komotau, he was transferred to the guard unit of the Stalag IV-B prisoner-of-war camp in Mühlberg/Elbe at the end of September 1944. In April 1945, the guards of the prisoner-of-war camp fled to Altenburg in the American occupation zone. Schwimmer made his way on foot to his wife in Wohlbach in the Vogtland.

After the end of the war, he joined the Communist Party of Germany and in 1946 received an appointment as professor and head of the graphics department at the Hochschule für Grafik und Buchkunst Leipzig. He worked there from 1946 to 1950. In 1951, he was relieved of his duties as a result of a targeted campaign. On 29 October 1951, he was officially appointed to the Dresden Hochschule für Bildende Künste Dresden as head of the graphics department, where he remained until his death.

Schwimmer died in Leipzig at the age of 64 as a result of a heart attack. On 23 March 1960, the urn burial took place at the Leipzig-Lindenau cemetery.

Schwimmer counts as an expressive realist among the most important painters of Saxony from the last century. He was a member of the Academy of Arts, Berlin from 1952.

== Awards ==
- 1955: Vaterländischer Verdienstorden in Silver
- 1956: Nationalpreis der DDR II. Klasse for his illustrations to Heines Wintermärchen and Pierre Augustin Caron de Beaumarchais' Figaros Hochzeit

== Work ==
The artist's estate in the possession of the Stadtbibliothek Leipzig includes 72 paintings, 30 gouaches, 1494 watercolours, 1880 drawings, 2335 book illustrations. Among them are 1267 works from the estate of Ilske Schwimmer, Max Schwimmer's second wife.

== Honours ==
On the house Gottschedstrasse 4 in Leipzig a memorial plaque commemorates the painter.
