= Else (surname) =

Else is a surname. Notable people with the surname include:

- Anne Else (born 1945), New Zealand writer and editor
- Barbara Else (born 1947), New Zealand writer
- Chris Else (born 1942), New Zealand author
- Craig Else (born 1964), American musician
- Dirk Else (born 1977), German ski jumper
- Fred Else (1933–2015), English footballer and manager
- Gerald Else (1908–1982), American classical philologist
- Harry Else (1906–1986), American baseball player
- Jean Else (born 1950), English schoolteacher
- Jon H. Else (born 1944), American documentary filmmaker
- Joseph Else (1874–1955), British sculptor
- Juann Else (born 2003), South African rugby union player
- Robert Else (1876–1955), English cricketer
