= Else Pappenheim =

American neurologist (1911–2009)

Else Pappenheim (May 22, 1911, in Salzburg, Austria-Hungary – January 11, 2009, in New York) was an American neurologist, psychiatrist and psychoanalyst of Austrian origin.

== Life ==
Else Pappenheim came from a traditional Jewish family of doctors. Her mother Edith Goldschmidt (1883–1942) - a granddaughter of the founder of the first female high school in Leipzig, Henriette Goldschmidt - could not escape the persecution of Jews and committed suicide with her sister in 1942. Her father Martin Pappenheim (1881-1943) was head of the neurological department at Lainz Hospital, who emigrated to Palestine in 1934 as an opponent of Austrofascism. Her aunt was Marie ''(Mitzi)'' Pappenheim, who was one of the first women to receive her doctorate from the medical school in Vienna; under her married name Marie Frischauf, she ran sex advice centers for the poor in Vienna together with Wilhelm Reich, before emigrating in 1934.

Else Pappenheim grew up in Vienna, where she attended Eugenie Schwarzwald's reform school before beginning her studies in medicine. In 1937, Pappenheim was one of the last analysts to be trained at the Vienna Psychoanalytic Institute. Until March 1938, Pappenheim worked at the University Hospital Vienna as a secondary doctor for neurology and psychiatry. After the Anschluss, the Psychoanalytical Institute was closed and its members were forced to flee. Pappenheim emigrated to the United States via Palestine, where she met American psychoanalysis at Johns Hopkins University in Baltimore with one of the leading US psychiatrists, Adolf Meyer, whose analytical level, however, she found "primitive". In the United States, Else Pappenheim married Stephen Frischauf in 1946, who had also emigrated from Austria. The family later lived in New York, where the now Else Frishauf worked as a freelance psychoanalyst and held professorships at various universities.

In 1956 Pappenheim visited Austria again for the first time since her flight. However, it was not until 1987, as part of the "Expelled Reason" symposium, in which she took part along with many other emigrants, that there was a certain rapprochement with Austria in the form of an exchange with young Austrian psychiatrists and psychoanalysts.

Else Pappenheim died in New York at the age of 97. She was the last living member of the Vienna Psychoanalytic Association from before 1938 and one of the last witnesses who could provide information about the end and re-establishment of psychoanalysis.

== Writings ==
- Else Pappenheim: "Contemporary Witness", in: Friedrich Stadler [Ed.]: International Symposium, October 19 to 23, 1987 in Vienna: Emigration and Exile of Austrian Science, Vienna: Youth and People, 1987 ISBN 3-224-16525-1, p 221–229 (autobiographical)
