= Søndermark Cemetery =

Cemetery in Copenhagen, Denmark

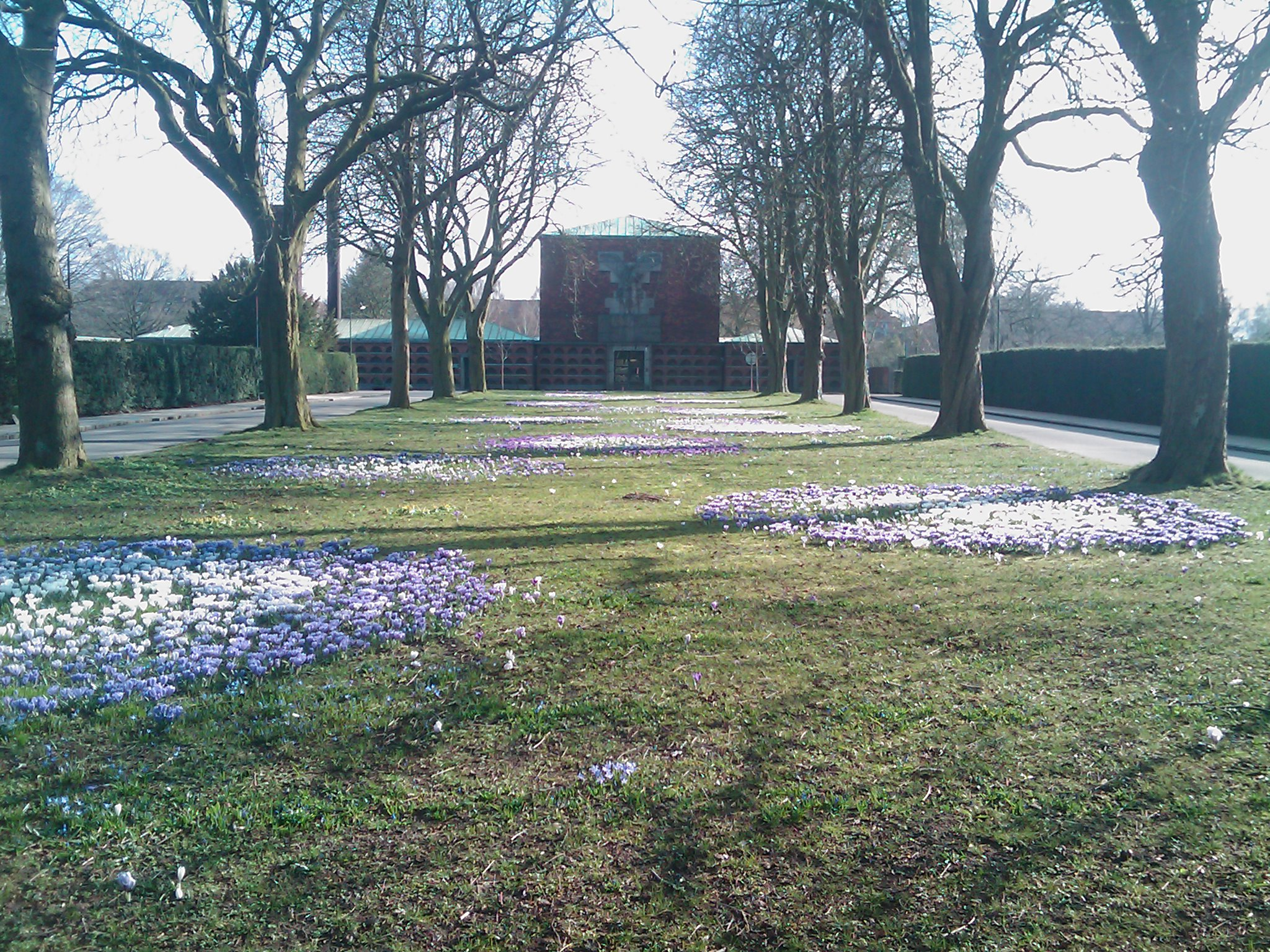
- The chapel and crematory complex seen from the central avenue

Details
- Established: 1929
- Location: 59 Roskildevej; Frederiksberg, Copenhagen
- Country: Denmark
- Coordinates: 55°40′16″N 12°30′36″E
- Owned by: Frederiksberg Municipality
- Size: 6 hectares

Søndermark Cemetery (Danish: Søndermark Kirkegård) is a cemetery in the Frederiksberg district of Copenhagen, Denmark, located on Roskildevej, opposite Solbjerg Park Cemetery. It is the youngest of the three cemeteries in Frederiksberg Municipality.

== History ==
The cemetery was designed by the landscape architect Gudmund Nyeland Brandt.

== Chapel and crematorium complex ==
A competition for a combined crematorium and chapel was held in 1926 and won by Edvard Thomsen and Frits Schlegel. The complex, which in part differs from their winning proposal, was built from 1927 to 1930, and is one of the earliest examples of Modernism in religious architecture in Denmark. The facade front is decorated with a large relief designed by Einar Utzon-Frank.

The Birkelunden area was inaugurated in 1963.

== Søndermark Cemetery today ==
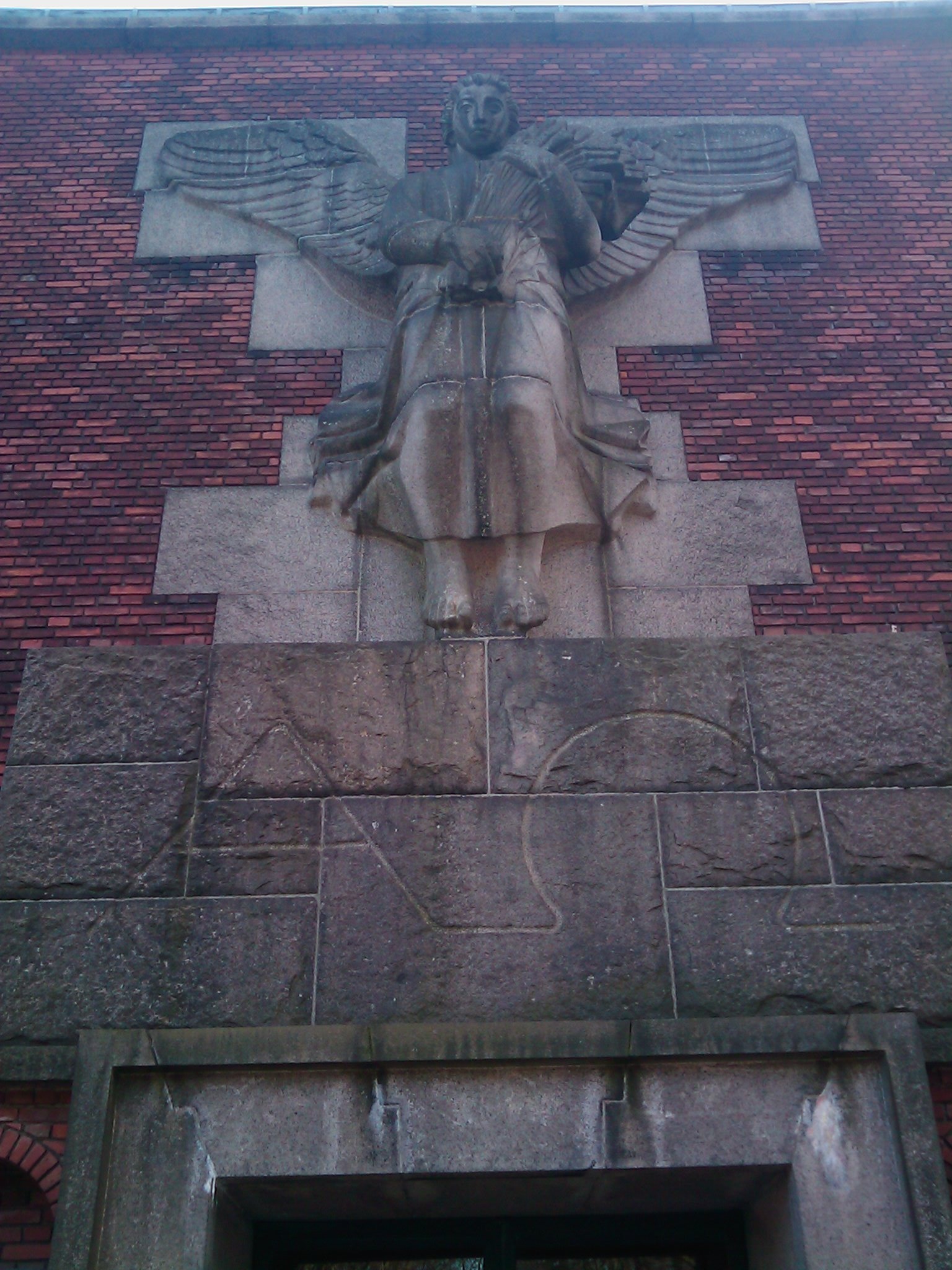
Utzon-Frank's relief at the chapel front

To the north the cemetery is bound by a brick wall along Roskildevej. A gate opens into an avenue which leads to the chapel in the chapel-crematorium complex. Apart from the Birkelunden area, the layout is traditional and vegetation is kept low.

== Interments ==
- Ove Abildgaard
- Ebba Amfeldt (Birkelunden)
- Tove Bang (Birkelunden)
- Aage Bendixen (Birkelunden)
- Jytte Breuning
- Christel
- Gösta Schwarck
- Benjamin Christensen (Birkelunden)
- John Christmas Møller
- Jørgen Clevin (Birkelunden)
- Lilian Ellis (nedlagt)
- Christian Flagstad (Birkelunden)
- Erik Frederiksen (Birkelunden)
- William Fridericia (Birkelunden)
- Flemming Geill
- Astrid Henning-Jensen (Birkelunden)
- Bjarne Henning-Jensen (Birkelunden)
- Inge Hvid-Møller (Birkelunden)
- Else Hvidhøj (Birkelunden)
- Otto Hænning
- Kjeld Ingrisch (Birkelunden)
- Ingeborg Irminger
- Valdemar Irminger
- Ellen Jansø
- Kai Julian (Birkelunden)
- Preben Kaas (Birkelunden)
- Ole Kiilerich
- Gunnar Lauring (Birkelunden)
- Mogens Lind (nedlagt)
- Otto Lington (Birkelunden)
- Lone Luther (Birkelunden)
- Lis Løwert
- Johannes Marott (Birkelunden)
- Ole Monty (Birkelunden)
- Henning Møller
- Svend-Erik Nørregaard
- Knud Pheiffer
- Børge Roger-Henrichsen (Birkelunden)
- Jørgen Roos
- Karl Roos
- Noemi Roos
- Franz Šedivý
- Bodil Steen (Birkelunden)
- Karl Stegger (Birkelunden)
- Inger Stender (Birkelunden)
- Elga Olga Svendsen (Birkelunden)
- Knud Vad Thomsen (Birkelunden)
- Valdemar Vester
- Bjørn Watt Boolsen
- Arne Weel (Birkelunden)
- Henning Wellejus
- Bent Werther (Birkelunden)
- Hanne Winther-Jørgensen (Birkelunden)
- Inge Østergaard (nedlagt)
- Gwili Andre
- Danny Bengtsen
- Berthe Cathrine (Nielsen) Sorensen

== See also ==
- Parks and open spaces in Copenhagen
