= Reichhardt =

Reichhardt is a surname. Notable people with the surname include:

- Cynthia Olson Reichhardt, American physicist
- Peter Reichhardt (born 1967), Danish actor and theatre director
- Poul Reichhardt (1913–1985), Danish actor, father of Peter
