= Methling =

Methling is a Danish surname. Notable people with the surname include:

- Sven Methling (1918–2005), Danish film director and screenwriter
- Svend Methling (1891–1977), Danish actor and film director, father of Sven
