= Hejrenæs =

1953 film by Svend Methling

- Directed by: Sven Methling
- Written by: Holger Boëtius (play); Svend Methling (play); Henriette Munk
- Produced by: Svend Nielsen
- Starring: John Wittig; Astrid Villaume; Karin Nellemose
- Cinematography: Henning Bendtsen; Einar Olsen
- Edited by: Edith Schlüssel
- Music by: Svend Erik Tarp
- Production company: Palladium Productions
- Release date: 27 February 1953
- Running time: 84 minutes
- Country: Denmark
- Language: Danish

Hejrenæs is a 1953 Danish film directed by Svend Methling and starring John Wittig, Astrid Villaume, and Karin Nellemose.

== Cast ==
- John Wittig as Godsejer Hans-Henrik Thann
- Astrid Villaume as Vibeke Thann
- Karin Nellemose as Tante Sofia
- Maria Garland as Tante Hortense
- Lisbeth Movin as Ulla Biehle
- Ib Schønberg as Godsinspektør Sejersen
- Johannes Meyer as Herskabstjener Blackhøj
- Knud Rex as Skovfoged Ulf Henningsen
- Bendt Rothe as Fabrikant Helge Knudsen
- Carl Heger as Dyrlæge
- Peter Poulsen as Savværksbestyreren
- Jakob Nielsen as Skovarbejder Martin
- Emil Hass Christensen

== Bibliography ==
- Morten Piil. Gyldendals danske filmguide. Gyldendal A/S, 2008.
