= Poul Clemmensen =

Danish actor (1922–1998)

- Born: 6 January 1922; Copenhagen, Denmark
- Died: 16 September 1998 (aged 76)
- Occupation: Actor
- Years active: 1954–1992

Poul Clemmensen (6 January 1922 – 16 September 1998) was a Danish actor. He appeared in fifteen films and television shows between 1954 and 1992.

== Filmography ==
Year	Title	Role	Notes
1951	Som sendt fra himlen	Forlover	
1954	I kongens klæ'r	Betjent	
1955	Der kom en dag	Frihedskæmper	
1956	Den kloge mand	Studerende	
1958	Det lille hotel		
1958	Mor skal giftes	Chauffør Poulsen	
1963	The Girl and the Press Photographer	Portvagt i lufthavnen	Uncredited
1964	Paradise and Back	Tom - 36 år	
1977	Boys	Oles far	
1977	Nyt legetøj	Justitsminister	
1989	Waltzing Regitze	Jonas	
1989	Jydekompagniet 3		
1992	Kærlighedens smerte	Fredlund	
