= Jørgen Weel =

Danish actor (1922–1993)

- Born: 13 August 1922; Copenhagen, Denmark
- Died: 16 June 1993 (aged 70); Denmark
- Occupation: Actor
- Years active: 1951–1990
- Parents: Arne Weel (father); Liva Weel (mother)

Jørgen Weelh (13 August 1922 – 16 June 1993) was a Danish film actor. He appeared in 26 films between 1951 and 1990. He was born in Copenhagen, Denmark and died in Denmark.

== Selected filmography ==
- Me and My Kid Brother and Doggie (1969)
- Mig og min lillebror og storsmuglerne (1968)
- Don Olsen kommer til byen (1964)
- The Last Winter (1960)
- Tag til marked i Fjordby (1957)
- Som sendt fra himlen (1951)
