= Me and My Kid Brother and Doggie =

1969 film

- Directed by: Lau Lauritzen Jr. Lisbeth Movin
- Written by: Willy Breinholst; Aage Stentoft
- Produced by: Henning Karmark; Lau Lauritzen, Jr.
- Starring: Dirch Passer
- Cinematography: Erik Wittrup Willumsen
- Edited by: Nils-Ulrik Meyer
- Music by: Sven Gyldmark
- Distributed by: ASA Film
- Release date: 12 December 1969
- Running time: 86 minutes
- Country: Denmark
- Language: Danish

Me and My Kid Brother and Doggie (Danish: Mig og min lillebror og Bølle) is a 1969 Danish comedy film directed by Lau Lauritzen Jr. and Lisbeth Movin and starring Dirch Passer.

== Cast ==
- Dirch Passer as Søren
- Poul Reichhardt as Peter
- Karl Stegger as Thorvald
- Guri Richter as Olivia
- Lotte Horne as Lone
- Jesper Langberg as Jens
- Peter Reichhardt as Lille Peter
- Helge Kjærulff-Schmidt as Pastor Weinholm
- Else Petersen as Pastorens kone
- Preben Mahrt as Bosholm
- Lotte Tarp as Fru Bosholm
- Christian Arhoff as Rasmus
- Gunnar Lemvigh as Direktør Holgersen
- Per Goldschmidt as Slagter Otto Kristoffersen
- Jørgen Weel as Kriminalassistent Lund
- Henrik Wiehe as Hansen
- Per Bentzon
- Lone Lau as Sofie
- Erik Paaske as TV journalist
- Søren Steen as Jornalisten
- Knud Hilding as Postbud Valdemar
- Flemming Dyjak as Slagsbror
- Carl Nielsen
- Gunnar Hansen as Himself
- Lisbeth Movin
