= Vi er allesammen tossede =

1959 film

- DVD cover
- Directed by: Sven Methling
- Written by: Arvid Müller; Aage Stentoft
- Produced by: Aage Stentoft; Henning Karmark
- Starring: Kjeld Petersen; Dirch Passer
- Cinematography: Aage Viltrup
- Music by: Sven Gyldmark
- Distributed by: ASA Film
- Release date: 18 December 1959
- Running time: 100 minutes
- Country: Denmark
- Language: Danish

Vi er allesammen tossede (English: We are Altogether Crazy) is a 1959 Danish comedy directed by Sven Methling and starring Kjeld Petersen, Buster Larsen, Birgitte Reimer and Dirch Passer. The film tells the story of a confused driver who is mistakenly committed to an insane asylum after insisting to police that his car was damaged in an accident with an elephant. The film received the Bodil Award for Best Danish Film in 1960 and is listed on the Danish Film Institute's Top 100 Danish Films.

== Cast ==
Actor	Role
Kjeld Petersen	Alex Alexandersen
Jessie Rindom	Mrs. Alexandersen
Birgitte Reimer	Birthe Allexandersen
Buster Larsen	Birthe's brother
Dirch Passer	Conductor
Bjørn Puggaard-Müller	Track Inspector
Keld Markuslund	Officer
Sonny Benneweis	Circus Director
Jørgen Beck	Guard
Bjørn Spiro	Police Assistant
Emil Hass Christensen	Doctor
Preben Mahrt	Chief Surgeon
Holger Munk	Doctor
Anna Hagen	Nanny
Lis Adelvard	Mrs. Hilding
Hedevig Schad	Mrs. Jørgensen
Ole Monty	Mogensen
Carl Ottosen	Officer
Christian Arhoff	Photographer
Mogens Brandt	Judge
Ego Brønnum-Jacobsen	Officer
Povl Wøldike	Police Doctor
Marteng Petersen	Alex Alexandersen as child
Gunnar Bigum	Courthouse Guard
Bent Vejlby	Prison Guard
Gunnar Strømvad	Knud E. Jørgensen
Erik Kühnau	Officer
Vivi Svendsen	
