= Mig og min lillebror og storsmuglerne =

1968 film

- Directed by: Lau Lauritzen Jr.
- Written by: Willy Breinholst; Aage Stentoft
- Produced by: Henning Karmark; Lau Lauritzen, Jr.
- Starring: Dirch Passer
- Cinematography: Jørgen Skov
- Edited by: Ole Steen Nielsen
- Music by: Sven Gyldmark
- Distributed by: ASA Film
- Release date: 12 September 1968
- Running time: 106 minutes
- Country: Denmark
- Language: Danish

Mig og min lillebror og storsmuglerne (transl. Me and My Kid Brother and the Smugglers) is a 1968 Danish comedy film directed by Lau Lauritzen Jr. and starring Dirch Passer.

== Cast ==
- Dirch Passer - Søren
- Poul Reichhardt - Peter
- Karl Stegger - Thorvald
- Guri Richter - Olivia
- Lotte Horne - Lone
- Jesper Langberg - Jens
- Peter Reichhardt - Lille Peter
- Palle Huld - Direktør Holm
- Henrik Wiehe - Hansen
- Else-Marie - Sofie Olsen
- Lise Thomsen - Fru Holm
- Christian Arhoff - Landbetjent Rasmus
- Gunnar Lemvigh - Sognerådsformanden
- Else Petersen - Anna
- Holger Vistisen - Leder af nudistlejeren
- Mogens Brandt - Politimesteren
- Bjørn Puggaard-Müller - Betjent Pedersen
- Jørgen Weel - Betjent
- Jørgen Teytaud - Betjent
- Bjørn Spiro - Arrestforvareren
- Flemming Dyjak - Smugleren Viggo
- Bent Vejlby - Smugleren Hans
- Kirsten Hansen-Møller - Servitricen Hanne
- Lone Lau - Servitricen Pia
- Knud Hilding - Postbudet
