= Preben Lerdorff Rye =

Danish actor (1917–1995)

- Born: 23 May 1917; Rudkøbing, Denmark
- Died: 15 June 1995 (aged 78); Denmark
- Occupation: Actor
- Years active: 1941–1989

Preben Lerdorff Rye (23 May 1917 – 15 June 1995) was a Danish film actor. He appeared in 92 films between 1941 and 1989. He was born and died in Denmark.

== Selected filmography ==
- The Child (1940) – Jurastuderende
- En ganske almindelig pige (1940) – Toves kollega
- Tante Cramers testamente (1941) – Tjener Alfred Olsen
- Afsporet (1942) – Willy Hansen
- Vredens dag (1943) – Martin (Absalon's son from first marriage) (uncredited)
- I går og i morgen (1945) – Styrmand Andersen
- De røde enge (1945) – Alf
- Hans store aften (1946) – Morten Just
- Diskret ophold (1946) – Tømrermester Eriksen
- Brevet fra afdøde (1946) – Skuespiller
- Hatten er sat (1947) – Aage Larsen
- Røverne fra Rold (1947) – Reinald
- Støt står den danske sømand (1948) – 1. Styrmand på Marie Grubbe
- Mens porten var lukket (1948) – Egelev
- Hr. Petit (1948) – Detektiven
- Hvor er far? (1948) – Et bud
- Det gælder os alle (1949) – Chauffør Olsen
- Kampen mod uretten (1949) – Opsynsmand Hansen
- Vi vil ha' et barn (1949) – Hendes ven
- Det hændte i København (1949) – Nattevagt (uncredited)
- Din fortid er glemt (1950) – Terningspiller
- Smedestræde 4 (1950) – Sømanden
- Vesterhavsdrenge (1950) – Værle
- I gabestokken (1950) – Revisor Sejr
- Unge piger forsvinder i København (1951) – Johan
- Frihed forpligter (1951)
- Lyntoget (1951) – Henning Knudsen
- Bag de røde porte (1951) – Carlo Pedersen
- Avismanden (1952) – Johansen
- The Crime of Tove Andersen (1953) – Kriminalbetjent Knudsen
- Adam og Eva (1953) – Indbrudstyv
- Sønnen (1953) – Generalen
- Kongeligt besøg (1954) – Høvedsmand
- Karen, Maren og Mette (1954) – Henrik Larsen
- Ordet (1955) – Johannes Borgen (uncredited)
- Ild og Jord (1955) – Martin
- Mod og mandshjerte (1955) – Gangster
- Gengæld (1955) – Forfatter Donner
- Hvad vil De ha'? (1956) – Sømand
- Tante Tut fra Paris (1956) – Arthur Blume
- Den kloge mand (1956) – Gårdejer Thorkild Andersen
- Ingen tid til kærtegn (1957) – Erik's far
- Der var engang en gade (1957) – David
- Sønnen fra Amerika (1957) – En arbejder
- Mig og min familie (1957) – Hans
- Skovridergården (1957) – Fyrmester Larsen
- Hvor går Karl hen? (1957)
- Amor i telefonen (1957) – Magister Carolus Lieberg
- Mariannes bryllup (1958) – Axel von Bramfeldt
- Lyssky transport gennem Danmark (1958) – Mads
- Vagabonderne på Bakkegården (1958) – Jonas
- En fremmed banker på (1959) – Han
- Frihedens pris (1960) – Hipomand
- Skibet er ladet med (1960) – Skipper på Jupiter
- Løgn og løvebrøl (1961) – Hr. Christensen
- Hans Nielsen Hauge (1961) – Kong Frederik VI
- Paradis retur (1964) – Skuespiller
- Premiere i helvede (1964) – Philip Michaelsen
- Søskende (1966) – Mikael
- Der var engang (1966) – Første junker
- Lille mand, pas på! (1968)
- Hosekræmmeren (1971) – Vandringsmanden
- Præsten i Vejlby (1972) – Jens Larsen
- The First Circle (1973) – Professor Chelnov
- Nitten røde roser (1974) – Holger Hjort
- Normannerne (1976) – Regnar Lodbrog
- Strømer (1976) – Fessor
- Hærværk (1977) – Tigger
- Lille spejl (1978) – Skuespiller
- Rend mig i traditionerne (1979) – Davids far
- Next Stop Paradise (1980) – Hjalmar Krog
- Verden er fuld af børn (1980)
- Den ubetænksomme elsker (1982) – Læge Bruun
- The Element of Crime (1984) – Grandfather
- Babettes gæstebud (1987) – Captain
- Hip Hip Hurrah! (1987) – Blinde Christian
- Kampen om den røde ko (1987) – Filmoperatøren
- Isolde (1989) – Ældre mand (ægtepar)
- Christian (1989) – Grandfather
