= Gabriel Axel =

Danish film director, actor, writer and producer

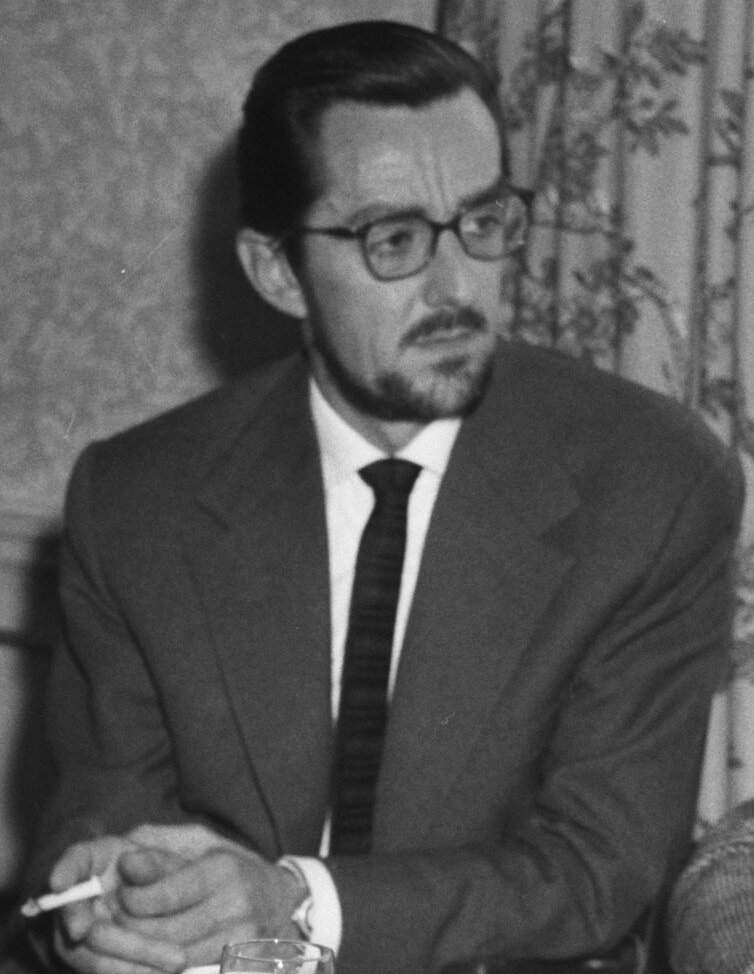
- Gabriel Axel (1959)
- Born: Axel Gabriel Erik Mørch; 18 April 1918; Aarhus, Denmark
- Died: 9 February 2014 (aged 95); Bagsværd (near Copenhagen), Denmark
- Education: Royal Danish Theatre
- Occupations: Film director, actor, writer, producer
- Years active: 1945–2001
- Known for: Babette's Feast
- Spouse: Lucie Juliette Laraignou (m. 1948–1996)
- Children: 4
- Awards: Academy Award; Rungstedlund Award

Axel Gabriel Erik Mørch better known as Gabriel Axel (18 April 1918 – 9 February 2014) was a Danish film director, actor, writer and producer, best known for Babette's Feast (1987), which he wrote and directed.

== Biography ==
Born in Aarhus, Denmark, on 18 April 1918, Axel spent most of his childhood in Paris in a wealthy Danish manufacturer's family.

In 1935, at age 17 following the family's economic collapse, he moved to Denmark and trained as a cabinet maker. In 1942, Axel was admitted to the acting school at the Royal Danish Theatre in Copenhagen. After graduating in 1945, he returned to France, where he spent five years on stage in Paris, including at the Théâtre de l'Athénée under theatre director Louis Jouvet. During the winter of 1948–1949 he produced Ludvig Holberg's Diderich Menschenskraek (Diderich the Terrible) at Théâtre de Paris.

Axel returned to Denmark in 1950, and broke through as a stage director in the early 1950s. His productions included La tête des autres (Other People's Heads) by Marcel Aymé, Le Cid by Pierre Corneille, and Pour Lucrèce by Jean Giraudoux. Axel started directing for television in 1951, and, from 1951 to 1968, did some 48 television dramas.

From 1955, Axel was a director at Nordisk Film. His debut feature, the social-realist drama Nothing But Trouble (1955), was highly praised, and the breakthrough came with the TV film A Woman Not Wanted in 1957.

He went on to direct a string of lighter comedies and farces before making the epic Nordic saga The Red Mantle in 1967, which was selected for Cannes Film Festival competition and won a Technical Prize (Mention spéciale du grand prix technique) at the 1967 Cannes Film Festival. His other films include the popular comedy The Goldcabbage Family (1975) and its sequel, and a series of sexually oriented features including the campaigning Det kære legetøj (1968) which advocated the legalisation of pornography in Denmark.

With some 16 feature films to his credits Axel returned to France in 1977, where he directed several large projects for French television, culminating in 1985 with a historical five-episode series, Les Colonnes du ciel (Heaven's Pillars).

In 1987, Axel returned to Denmark to direct what had been his dream project for over 15 years, and is considered his masterpiece, an adaptation of Karen Blixen's Babette's Feast. After screening at the Cannes Film Festival, the film won the Academy Award for Best Foreign Language Film at the 60th Academy Awards among others.

His next films, the youth drama Christian (1989), the historical drama Prince of Jutland (1994), after the legend of Prince Amleth, and starring Helen Mirren, Gabriel Byrne, and Christian Bale, and Leïla (2001), a love story set in Morocco, failed to achieve the same international resonance.

Alongside his directing career, Axel acted in a dozen Danish films, mostly in colourful supporting roles in popular comedies in the 1950s and 60s. He played the lead as the elegant charlatan Marcel de Sade in The Reluctant Sadist (1967).

Axel in 1995, was made a Knight of the French National Order of Merit, in 2000 Commander of the Ordre des Arts et des Lettres, and in 2003 was made Officer of the Legion of Honour. In 2003, Axel received a Lifetime Achievement Award at the Copenhagen International Film Festival. In 2012 he received the Rungstedlund Award.

Axel died in his sleep on 9 February 2014 at the age of 95.

== Selected filmography ==
Year	Title	Credits	Notes
1955	Altid ballade	Director	
1955	Der kom en dag	Actor	
1956	Kispus	Actor	
1957	En kvinde er overflødig	Director	
1958	The Girls Are Willing	Director	
1958	Styrmand Karlsen	Actor	
1959	Helle for Helene	Director	
1960	Flemming og Kvik	Director	
1962	Peters baby	Actor	
1962	Oskar	Director	
1962	Han, hun, Dirch og Dario	Actor	
1962	Crazy Paradise	Director	
1963	Vi har det jo dejligt	Director	
1963	Three Girls in Paris	Director, actor	
1963	Paradise and Back	Director	
1965	En ven i bolignøden	Actor	
1966	Dyden går amok	Actor	
1967	Hagbard and Signe	Director	
1967	The Reluctant Sadist	Actor	
1968	Det kære legetøj	Director	
1970	Amour	Director	
1971	Med kærlig hilsen	Director	
1972	Soft Shoulders, Sharp Curves	Director	
1972	Nu går den på Dagmar	Actor	
1975	Familien Gyldenkål	Director	
1976	Familien Gyldenkål sprænger banken	Director	
1977	Going for Broke	Director	
1987	Babette's Feast	Director	Academy Award
1989	Christian	Director	
1994	Prince of Jutland	Director	
1995	Lumière and Company	Director	Segment
2001	Leïla	Director	
