= John Wittig =

Danish actor (1921–1987)

- Born: 22 October 1921; Middelfart, Denmark
- Died: 23 October 1987 (aged 66); Denmark
- Occupation: Actor
- Years active: 1950-1987

John Wittig (22 October 1921 – 23 October 1987) was a Danish film actor. He appeared in 30 films between 1950 and 1987. He was born and died in Denmark.

== Filmography ==
Year	Title	Role	Notes
1949	Den stjaalne minister	Jurastuderende	
1950	Susanne	Ung mand	
1950	I gabestokken	Gæst i marketenderiet	
1951	Unge piger forsvinder i København	Sømand	Uncredited
1951	Som sendt fra himlen	Præst	
1951	Glem det aldrig		
1953	Hejrenæs	Godsejer Hans-Henrik Thann	
1953	Adam and Eve	Aagaard	
1955	Der kom en dag	Henning Pil	
1955	Bruden fra Dragstrup (1955)	Peter Brandt	
1956	Ung leg	Adjunkt Brandt	
1957	Tre piger fra Jylland	Pastor Martin Brandt	
1957	En kvinde er overflødig	Klaus Nielsen	
1958	Over alle grænser	Erik	
1958	Spion 503	Modstandsmand Jørgen	
1960	The Last Winter	Læge John Sørensen	
1961	Landsbylægen	Greve Hans Thomas Heinrich Foné	
1962	The Counterfeit Traitor	Sven	
1964	Tine (1964)	Kapellan Graae	
1965	Strike First Freddy	Agent I	Uncredited
1966	Relax Freddie	Agent I	Uncredited
1969	Ballad of Carl-Henning	Mejeribestyreren	
1970	The Only Way	Flugtleder / Escapeleader	
1987	Pelle the Conqueror	Skolelærer	
