= To minutter for sent =

1952 film

To minutter for sent (Two Minutes Too Late)
- Directed by: Torben Anton Svendsen
- Written by: Peer Guldbrandsen
- Produced by: John Hilbert
- Starring: Poul Reichhardt
- Cinematography: Verner Jensen; Jørgen Skov
- Distributed by: Nordisk Film
- Release date: 15 August 1952
- Running time: 98 minutes
- Country: Denmark
- Language: Danish

To minutter for sent (Two Minutes Too Late, in US, with subtitles) is a 1952 Danish crime film directed by Torben Anton Svendsen and starring Poul Reichhardt.

== Synopsis ==
Beth, who is a journalist, catches a ride to work with her playboy brother-in-law Max (Poul Reichhardt), and they drive through 1950s Copenhagen in his sporty car. Max has recently married Beth’s sister Grete, who is insanely jealous. Beth urges Max not to tell Grete about their innocent car ride.

Max is being blackmailed by his former girlfriend, Sara Klint. She calls him at his suburban home demanding a further 400 Danish kroner, and an angry Max insists that this will be the very last payoff. He drives into Copenhagen again to see her, coincidentally at the same time Grete is in the city for a hairdresser’s appointment.

Before the appointment, Grete stops into a bookshop to buy a magazine and absent-mindedly leaves her handbag behind. By the time she realizes it is missing, the bookshop is shut for the proprietor’s lunch hour. But Grete finds the door open, collects her handbag, and leaves.

Sara Klint is found dead in an apartment upstairs from the bookshop. As police investigate, they learn that Grete, known to be jealous of her husband's former girlfriend, was in the bookshop at the suspected time of the murder. This was based on accounts of witnesses who there.

Her sister Beth, plus her would-be boyfriend Ib and his father, a police captain who is a friend of the family, work together to hunt down the murderer of Klint.

Was it Grete herself? Could it be the bookseller, Rosenblad? Jacobsen, the hunchback clock repairman who also has a shop in the building? Johansen, the alcoholic building superintendent? Or was it Max?

It soon becomes clear that Max was not the only person being blackmailed by Sara Klint.

== Cast ==
- Poul Reichhardt as Max Paduan
- Grethe Thordahl as Grete Paduan
- Astrid Villaume as Beth
- Erik Mørk as Urmager Jacobsen
- Johannes Meyer as Vicevært Johansen
- Gunnar Lauring as Kriminalkommissær Normann
- Louis MieheasRenard as Journalist Ib Normann
- Jeanne Darville as Sara Klint
- Poul Müller as Antikvarboghandler Rosenblad
- Per Buckhøj as Kriminalassistenten
- Bjørn PuggaardasMüller as Tjener
- Karl Stegger as Betjent
