= Bendt Rothe =

Danish actor

- Bendt Rothe in the 1964 film Gertrud
- Born: 9 May 1921; Copenhagen, Denmark
- Died: 31 December 1989 (aged 68); Denmark
- Spouse(s): Birte Mirete Gad (m. 1973–1985), Vigga Bro (m. 1969–1972), Asta Riis Poulsen (m. 1947–1958)

Bendt Rothe (9 May 1921 – 31 December 1989) was a Danish actor who played the role of the rejected husband Gustav Kanning in Gertrud, the 1964 film by Carl Theodor Dreyer.

== Partial filmography ==
- De tre skolekammerater (1944) − Forsvarsadvokat
- Det bødes der for (1944) − Eigil Asgaard
- Drømmen om i morgen (1945)
- Diskret Ophold (1946) − Thorsten Olesen
- Fra den gamle Købmandsgaard (1951) − Erling
- Vi arme syndere (1952) − Maler Astrup
- Avismanden (1952) − Lægen
- Hejrenæs (1953) − Fabrikant Helge Knudsen
- Adam and Eve (1953) − Advokat
- Karen, Maren og Mette (1954) − Auktionarius
- Min datter Nelly (1955) − Tandlæge Bent Holm
- Bundfald (1957) − Kriminalassistenten
- Pigen i søgelyset (1959) − Chefredaktør
- Gymnasiepigen (1960) − Rektor Engskjold
- Komtessen (1961) − Højesteretssagfører Skotterup
- Ullabella (1961) − Viceskoledirektør
- Eventyr på Mallorca (1961) − Rejseleder Anders Kristensen
- The Counterfeit Traitor (1962) − Mögens (uncredited)
- Rikki og mændene (1962) − Knud
- Premiere i helvede (1964) − Doktor Gregersen
- Fem mand og Rosa (1964) − Philip André
- Gertrud (1964) − Gustav Kanning
- Don Olsen kommer til byen (1964) − Bankdirektør, Ben W.
- Nu stiger den (1966) − Greve Rosen
- Søskende (1966) − Arthur
- Historien om Barbara (1967)
- I Belong to Me (1967) − Dommeren
- Smukke−Arne og Rosa (1967) − Bankdirektør Schäfer
- Doctor Glas (1968) − Birck
- De røde heste (1968) − Dommer
- The Only Way (1970) − Sanders
- 19 Red Roses (1974) − Janus Bech
- Kassen stemmer (1976) − Bankdirektør
- Strømer (1976) − Mester
- Hærværk (1977) − H.C. Stefani
- The Heritage (1978) − Herredsfoged
- The Olsen Gang Long Gone (1981) − Fransk overtjener
- Babette's Feast (1987) − Old Nielsen
