= The Tinderbox (film) =

1946 film by Svend Methling

The Tinderbox (Danish: Fyrtøjet) is a 1946 Danish animated film directed by Svend Methling and produced by Dansk Farve- og Tegnefilm, Palladium, It is the first full-length Danish and European animated film ever made. It was an adaption of Hans Christian Andersen's popular fairytale of the same name. The film was in colour. The project was inspired by the works of Walt Disney, Max Fleischer, and Dave Fleischer, especially their "Gulliver's Travels" (1939).

== Cast ==
- Poul Reichhardt - the Soldier
- Kirsten Hermansen - the Princess
- Knud Heglund - the King
- Karen Poulsen - the Witch
- Elith Foss - the Astrological Signer
- Viggo Brodthagen
- Ole Monty
- Aage Winther-Jørgensen
- Vera Lindstrøm
- Victor Montell
- Vera Lense-Møller
- Axel Larsen
- Adelheid Nielsen
- Einar Reim
- Anna Henriques-Nielsen
- Carl Johan Hviid
- Ingeborg Steffensen
- Ulf Kaarsberg

Production took place from June 1943 until the 1945 at Frederiksberggade 28 in Copenhagen. During the production process, publisher Dansk Farve- og Tegnefilm kept a low profile, but the press still published a few articles about the project.
