= Karin Nellemose =

Danish actress (1905–1993)

- Karin Nellmose in Master of the House (1925)
- Born: 3 August 1905; Copenhagen, Denmark
- Died: 5 August 1993 (aged 88); Charlottenlund, Denmark
- Years active: 1925–1980

Karin Nellemose (3 August 1905 – 5 August 1993) was a Danish cinema and theatre actress. Her brother was sculptor Knud Nellemose (1908–1997). Nellemose played a significant role as the confused spinster Misse Møhge in the Danish-produced television series Matador, which first aired between 1978 and 1982.

== Selected filmography ==
- Du skal ære din hustru 1925
- Vester Vov-Vov 1927
- Tordenstenene 1927
- The Vicar of Vejlby 1931
- Kirke og orgel 1932
- Barken Margrethe af Danmark 1934
- Nøddebo Præstegård 1934
- Den mandlige husassistent 1938
- Livet på Hegnsgaard 1938
- Elverhøj 1939
- En desertør 1940
- Tak fordi du kom, Nick 1941
- Tyrannens fald 1942
- Tordenskjold går i land 1942
- Mine kære koner 1942
- Familien Gelinde 1944
- Spurve under taget 1944
- I går og i morgen 1945
- Brevet fra afdøde 1946
- Oktoberroser 1946
- Hans store aften 1946
- Soldaten og Jenny 1947
- Tre år efter 1948
- Mens porten var lukket 1948
- Hr. Petit 1948
- Kampen mod uretten 1949
- Susanne 1950
- Café Paradis 1950
- Min kone er uskyldig 1950
- Avismanden 1952
- We Who Go the Kitchen Route 1953
- The Old Mill on Mols 1953
- Sønnen 1953
- Hejrenæs 1953
- Adam og Eva 1953
- Det er så yndigt at følges ad 1954
- Hendes store aften 1954
- Bruden fra Dragstrup 1955
- Jeg elsker dig 1957
- Baronessen fra benzintanken 1960
- Støv på hjernen 1961
- Det stod i avisen 1962
- Dronningens vagtmester 1963
- Pigen og greven 1966
