= Guri Richter =

Danish actress (1917–1995)

- Born: 7 July 1917; Copenhagen, Denmark
- Died: 21 August 1995 (aged 78); Copenhagen, Denmark
- Occupation: Actress
- Years active: 1940–1990

Guri Agnes Richter (7 July 1917 – 21 August 1995) was a Danish film actress. She appeared in 13 films between 1940 and 1990.

== Filmography ==
- Farlig leg (1990)
- Erasmus Montanus (1973)
- Mig og min lillebror og Bølle (1969)
- Mig og min lillebror og storsmuglerne (1968)
- Mig og min lillebror (1967)
- I stykker (1966)
- Utro (1966)
- Paradis retur (1964)
- Den rige enke (1962)
- I gabestokken (1950)
- Regnen holdt op (1942)
- Gå med mig hjem (1941)
- Barnet (1940)
