= Jan Priiskorn-Schmidt =

Danish actor (born 1951)

- Born: 22 February 1951; Copenhagen, Denmark
- Died: December 16, 2023 (aged 72)
- Other name: Jan Priskorn
- Occupation: Actor
- Years active: 1960–1972

Jan Priiskorn-Schmidt (born 22 February 1951, died 16 December 2023) is a Danish film actor. He appeared in 25 films between 1960 and 1972. He was born in Copenhagen, Denmark.

== Filmography ==
- Rektor på sengekanten (1972)
- Min søsters børn, når de er værst (1971)
- Min søsters børn vælter byen (1968)
- Min søsters børn på bryllupsrejse (1967)
- Min søsters børn (1966)
- Slå først, Frede! (1965)
- Een pige og 39 sømænd (1965)
- Pigen og millionæren (1965)
- Flådens friske fyre (1965)
- Passer passer piger (1965)
- De blå undulater (1965)
- Sommer i Tyrol (1964)
- Mord for åbent tæppe (1964)
- Døden kommer til middag (1964)
- Støv for alle pengene (1963)
- Peters landlov (1963)
- Pigen og pressefotografen (1963)
- Venus fra Vestø (1962)
- Den rige enke (1962)
- Flemming på kostskole (1961)
- Støv på hjernen (1961)
- Soldaterkammerater på efterårsmanøvre (1961)
- Sorte Shara (1961)
- Mine tossede drenge (1961)
- Flemming og Kvik (1960)
