= Henning Moritzen =

Danish actor (1928–2012)

- Born: 3 August 1928; Taarbæk, Denmark
- Died: 11 August 2012 (aged 84); Frederiksberg, Denmark
- Occupation: Actor
- Years active: 1950–2010

Henning Moritzen (3 August 1928 – 11 August 2012) was a Danish film actor. He appeared in more than 70 films between 1950 and 2010. He was born in Taarbæk, Denmark.

== Partial filmography ==
=== Film ===
- John og Irene (1949) – Gæst ved Carlsens selskab (uncredited)
- For frihed og ret (1949) – Ung mand ved Stavnsbåndsjubilæet
- Susanne (1950) – Ung mand
- Vores fjerde far (1951) – Mand på bænk
- Frihed forpligter (1951) – Ung landmand
- Dorte (1951) – Doktor Sørensen
- Kærlighedsdoktoren (1952) – 1. Kontorist
- We Who Go the Kitchen Route (1953) – Dick
- Den gamle mølle på Mols (1953) – Fløgstrup
- Adam og Eva (1953) – Tolder
- This Is Life (1953) – Sanglærer Stefan Korsby
- Himlen er blå (1954) – Slagterens datters kæreste
- Et eventyr om tre (1954) – Kjeld
- Bruden fra Dragstrup (1955) – Walter Brandt
- Kispus (1956) – Jakob
- Tante Tut fra Paris (1956) – Bent Larsen
- Mariannes bryllup (1958) – Jørgen von Hejden
- Mor skal giftes (1958) – Ove Bang
- Poeten og Lillemor (1959) – Poeten
- Poeten og Lillemor og Lotte (1960) – The poet
- Forelsket i København (1960) – Jan Scharf
- Jetpiloter (1961) – Kaptajn Tom Jessen
- Harry og kammertjeneren (1961) – Fyrst Igor
- Poeten og Lillemor i forårshumør (1961) – Poeten
- Eventyr på Mallorca (1961) – Journalist Michael Bolberg
- Crazy Paradise (1962) – Narrator / fortælleren
- Den kære familie (1962) – Alex Maagenhjelm
- Det stod i avisen (1962) – Johan Jespersen
- Venus fra Vestø (1962) – John Morland
- Støvsugerbanden (1963) – Peter Park
- Alt for kvinden (1964) – Grev Ditlev Liljenborg / Grev Peder Joachim Liljenborg
- Don Olsen kommer til byen (1964) – Fortælleren
- Tænk på et tal (1969) – Stines Far
- Stine og drengene (1969) – Flemming Borck
- Cries and Whispers (1972) – Joakim
- Pengene eller livet (1982) – Poul Kristiansen
- Peter von Scholten (1987) – Kong Christian VIII
- Dansen med Regitze (1989) – Borge
- Sofie (1992) – Frederick Philipson
- Roser & persille (1993) – Willy Larsen
- Baby Doom (1998) – Holstein
- Festen (1998) – Faderen – Helge Klingenfeld
- Her i nærheden (2000) – Baronen
- Grev Axel (2001) – Proglog (voice)
- Nu (2002, Short) – Adam (old)
- Visions of Europe (2004) – (segment "Denmark: Europe")
- Strings (2004) – Kahro (voice)
- Allegro (2005) – Tom
- Headhunter (2009) – Niels Frederiks Sieger
- Everything Will Be Fine (2010) – Lemmy Braun

=== Television ===
- Onkel Vanya (1971, TV Movie) – Astrof
- Livsens ondskab (1972) – Fortælleren
- En by i provinsen (1977–1980) – Eriksen, Kriminalinspektør
- SK 917 har nettopp landet (1984) – Purseren
- Tango for tre (1994) – Willy
- Renters rente (1996) – Direktør Nicolaj 'Nic' Holm
- Madsen og Co. (1996) – Ejnar
- Bryggeren (1997) – C. A. Reitzel
- Better Times (2004) – Hr. Stokmand
- Forsvar (2004) – Ewald Bork
