= Cynthia Olson =

Cynthia Olson may refer to:

- SS Cynthia Olson, American cargo ship built in 1918 and sunk in 1941
- Cynthia Olson Reichhardt (also published as C. J. Olson), American physicist

== See also ==
- Susan Olsen (born 1961), American actress and former radio personality; known for playing Cynthia Brady in the US sitcom The Brady Bunch
