= The Reluctant Sadist =

- Danish poster by Kurt Wenzel
- Directed by: Mac Ahlberg; Peer Guldbrandsen
- Written by: Peer Guldbrandsen
- Produced by: Palle Schnedler-Sørensen
- Starring: Gabriel Axel
- Cinematography: Mac Ahlberg
- Edited by: Edith Nisted Nielsen
- Music by: Chopin; Johan Strauss; Sven Gyldmark
- Distributed by: Novaris Film
- Release date: 27 March 1967
- Running time: 101 minutes
- Countries: Denmark; Sweden
- Language: Danish

The Reluctant Sadist (AKA I, a Nobleman; Danish: Jeg - en marki, Swedish: Jag - en älskare) is a 1967 Danish-Swedish comedy film directed by Mac Ahlberg and Peer Guldbrandsen, and starring Gabriel Axel in the role of Marcel de Sade.

== Cast ==
- Gabriel Axel - Marcel de Sade
- Buster Larsen - Lawyer
- Karl Stegger - Mikkelsen
- Elsa Prawitz - Mrs. Mikkelsen
- Carl Ottosen - Flyttemand
- Preben Nikolajsen - Flyttemand
- Lotte Hermann - Mikkelsen's office lady
- Bjørn Puggaard-Müller - Mikkelsen's procurator
- Carl-Axel Elfving - Music professor
- Hans Brenå - Balletmaster
- John Price - Auditor
- Tove Maës - Mrs Vibeke Poulsen
- Lise Thomsen - Office lady
- Børge Møller Grimstrup - Police officer
- Klaus Pagh - Bank clerk
- Poul Bundgaard - Bank direktor
- Preben Kaas - Publisher
- Lisbeth Lindeborg - Olga
- Hans Lindgren - Count
- Ove Sprogøe - Baron Neully du Prat
- Paul Hagen - James
- Lotte Horne - Else, manicure lady
- Joakim Rasmussen - Auktionarius
- Jytte Breuning - Lady in bar
- Lotte Tarp - Baronesse
- Jeanne Darville - Countess
- Bente Juhl - En sagførerkone
- Simon Rosenbaum - En herre
- Ulla Johansson - Bogforlæggerens kone
