= Knud Heglund =

Danish actor (1894–1960)

- Born: 10 July 1894; Copenhagen, Denmark
- Died: 1 September 1960 (aged 66); Gentofte Municipality, Denmark

Knud Heglund (10 July 1894 – 1 September 1960) was a Danish stage and film actor.

== Life ==
Knud Heglund grew up in Copenhagen, Denmark and is the son of Lars Heglund (husband, tailor and wardrobe manager, died 1921) and Johanna Voss (wife, died 1944).

Knud Heglund was briefly married to actress Gerda Kofoed before married to Lili Heglund. In his second marriage, they had two son, JÃ3rgen Ole Heglund (1924-????) and SÃ3ren Heglund (1928–2023). He died on 1st September 1960 at the age of 66 due to complication of thrombosis. He is buried in Bispebjerg Cemetery, Copenhagen.

== Filmography ==
- Tretten år (1932)
- De blaa drenge (1933)
- Flight from the Millions (1934)
- Under byens tage (1938)
- En pige med pep (1940)
- Niels Pind og hans dreng (1941)
- Tror du jeg er født i går? (1941)
- Frøken Kirkemus (1941)
- Tag til Rønneby kro (1941)
- Tak fordi du kom, Nick (1941)
- Frøken Vildkat (1942)
- Tordenskjold går i land (1942)
- Ballade i Nyhavn (1942)
- Hans onsdagsveninde (1943)
- Det ender med bryllup (1943)
- Teatertosset (1944)
- Frihed, lighed og Louise (1944)
- Bedstemor går amok (1944)
- Det kære København (1944)
- Mens sagføreren sover (1945)
- De pokkers unger (1947)
- Kristinus Bergman (1948)
- Tre år efter (1948)
- Min kone er uskyldig (1950)
- Susanne (1950)
- Mød mig på Cassiopeia (1951)
- Familien Schmidt (1951)
- The Old Mill on Mols (1953)
- Tre piger fra Jylland (1957)

== Revues ==
- Odder Summer Theatre (1917)
- Nykøbing F. Revueen (1917)
- Nørrebros Theatre (1925)
- Apollo Revue (1926, 1927, 1928, 1940)
- Betty Nansen Theatre (1938)
- Dagmar Revyen (1941)
- The Circus Revue (1942)

== Cartoon voice acting ==
- The Tinderbox (1946) — as The King
- Pinocchio (1950)— as Mikkel From
- Cinderella (1950) — as The Count (likely refer to The Duke)
- Alice in Wonderland (1951) — as The Mad Hatter
