= Me and My Kid Brother =

1967 film

- Directed by: Lau Lauritzen Jr.
- Written by: Ulrich Ravnbøl; Aage Stentoft; Oscar Wennersten
- Produced by: Ole Mølgaard Andersen; Just Betzer
- Starring: Dirch Passer
- Cinematography: Mikael Salomon
- Edited by: Nils-Ulrik Meyer
- Music by: Sven Gyldmark
- Distributed by: ASA Film
- Release date: 15 December 1967
- Running time: 95 minutes
- Country: Denmark
- Language: Danish

Me and My Kid Brother (Danish: Mig og min lillebror) is a 1967 Danish comedy film directed by Lau Lauritzen Jr. and starring Dirch Passer.

== Plot ==
Two lazy brothers living on their parents' profitless old farm go to Copenhagen for advice after their sister threatens to sell it. They bring home a waitress from the city to help them profitably run the farm.

== Cast ==
- Dirch Passer as Søren Severinsen
- Poul Reichhardt as Peter Severinsen
- Lily Broberg as Annelise Hansen
- Jesper Langberg as Jens Olsen
- Else-Marie as Sofie Olsen
- Gunnar Lauring as Sognerådsformanden
- Karl Stegger as Thorvald Christensen
- Guri Richter as Olivia Christensen
- Lotte Horne as Lone Christensen
- Palle Huld as Frederik Holm
- Lise Thomsen as Fru. Holm
- Arthur Jensen as Amtmanden
- Christian Arhoff as Landbetjent Rasmussen
- Valsø Holm as Landsretssagfører Mortensen
- Peer Guldbrandsen as Værten
- Einar Juhl as Minister
- Elga Olga Svendsen as Minister
- Bjørn Spiro as Tysk turist
