= Poul Pedersen (cinematographer) =

American cinematographer

- Born: 16 May 1925; Racine, Wisconsin, United States
- Died: 14 May 2003 (aged 77); Denmark
- Occupation: Cinematographer
- Years active: 1944-1962

Poul Pedersen (16 May 1925 – 14 May 2003) was an American cinematographer who co-founded the Danish Cinematographers Guild (Dansk Filmfotograf Forbund) in 1954. Pedersen worked on 18 Danish feature films for the Nordisk Film studio from 1944 to 1962. His films included Kispus (1956), the first Danish feature movie to be filmed in color, and Qivitoq (1956) which was nominated for the Academy Award for Best Foreign Language Film and the Palme D'Or.

== Selected filmography ==
- For frihed og ret (1949)
- Vesterhavsdrenge (1950)
- Mød mig på Cassiopeia (1951)
- Familien Schmidt (1951)
- Vi arme syndere (1952)
- Adam og Eva (1953)
- Vi som går køkkenvejen (1953)
- Kongeligt besøg (1954)
- Det er så yndigt at følges ad (1954)
- Altid ballade (1955)
- Kispus (1956)
- Qivitoq (1956)
- Jeg elsker dig (1957)
- Poeten og Lillemor (1959)
- Forelsket i København (1960)
- Tro, håb og trolddom (1960)
- Mine tossede drenge (1961)
