= En kvinde er overflødig =

1957 film

- Directed by: Gabriel Axel
- Written by: Flemming Lynge
- Produced by: Erik Balling
- Cinematography: Jørgen Skov
- Edited by: Carsten Dahl
- Music by: Herman D. Koppel
- Distributed by: Nordisk Film
- Release date: 29 April 1957
- Running time: 88 minutes
- Country: Denmark
- Language: Danish

En kvinde er overflødig (lit. 'A woman not wanted') is a 1957 Danish drama film directed by Gabriel Axel which focuses on a working-class family.

Clara Pontoppidan received a Bodil Award for Best Actress in a Leading Role for her role as Enkefru Tang.

== Cast ==
- Clara Pontoppidan
- William Rosenberg
- Birgitte Federspiel
- John Wittig
- Bjørn Watt-Boolsen
- Jørn Jeppesen
- Svend Methling
- Lis Løwert
- Minna Jørgensen
- Pouel Kern
