= Fun in the Streets =

1969 film

- Directed by: Carl Ottosen
- Written by: Carl Ottosen
- Produced by: Palle Schnedler-Sørensen
- Starring: Dirch Passer
- Cinematography: Claus Loof
- Edited by: Knud Hauge
- Music by: Sven Gyldmark
- Release date: 1 August 1969
- Running time: 88 minutes
- Country: Denmark
- Language: Danish

Fun in the Streets (Danish: Sjov i gaden) is a 1969 Danish comedy film directed by Carl Ottosen and starring Dirch Passer.

== Cast ==
- Dirch Passer - Peter Jensen
- Winnie Mortensen - Winnie
- Ove Sprogøe - Fløjten
- Willy Rathnov - Rasmussen
- Karl Stegger - Bagermester Jacobsen
- Carl Ottosen - Chefen
- Lotte Horne - Elisabeth
- Birgit Sadolin - Faster Anna
- Arne Møller - Carlo
- Kurt Andersen - Orla
- Ernst Meyer - Gossain
- Poul Bundgaard - Fordrukken mand i opgang
- Bodil Udsen - Hans sure kone
- Inger Gleerup - Ekspeditrice i stormagasin
- Poul Glargaard - Kriminalassistent
- Marianne Tholsted - Ekspeditrice i legetøjsforretning
- Claus Ryskjær - Cykelbud
- Palle Justesen - Hotelportier
