= Jakob Nielsen (actor) =

Danish actor (1900–1979)

- Born: 8 June 1900; Frederiksberg, Denmark
- Died: 4 April 1979 (aged 78); Denmark
- Occupation: Actor
- Years active: 1937–1976

Jakob Nielsen (8 June 1900 – 4 April 1979) was a Danish actor. He appeared in more than 45 films between 1937 and 1976.

== Selected filmography ==
- Life on the Hegn Farm (1938)
- Those Blasted Kids (1947)
- Det Sande Ansigt (1951)
- The Son (1953)
- The Crime of Tove Andersen (1953)
- Der kom en dag (1955)
- Vagabonderne på Bakkegården (1958)
- Paradise and Back (1964)
- Hejrenæs (1953)
