= Sven Methling =

Danish film director and screenwriter

- Born: 20 September 1918; Copenhagen, Denmark
- Died: 7 August 2005 (aged 86); Frederiksberg, Denmark
- Occupation(s): Director, screenwriter
- Years active: 1946–1996
- Awards: Bodil Award; 1960 Vi er alle sammen tossede 1955 Der kom en dag Starboy Award; 1991 Krummerne

Sven Johan Methling (or Sven Methling Jr.) (20 September 1918 – August 7, 2005) was a Danish film director and screenwriter. The son of actor and film director Svend Methling, Methling Jr. was best known for a series of light-hearted comedies. His 1959 comedy Vi er allesammen tossede (All of us are Crazy) received the Bodil Award for Best Danish Film. Methling also received the Bodil Award for Best Danish Film for the 1955 war drama Der kom en dag (There Will Come a Day).

== Career ==
Sven Johan Methling was born in Copenhagen, Denmark on 20 September 1918. As the son of film director Svend Methling, Methling Jr. was born into the film industry. He started work as a sound assistant with Palladium Films from 1940 to 1945. In 1944, Methling performed the leading role in the drama Det Store Ansvar (The Great Responsibility), directed by his father. Then in 1946, he co-directed with his father an animated feature, Fyretøjet, based on the H.C. Andersen story.

Methling made his solo directorial debut in 1953 with the crime drama Kriminalsagen. His next effort, Der kom en dag (There Will Come a Day) was a war drama about the German occupation of Denmark during World War II. Based upon a novel by Flemming Muus, the film received critical praise and was awarded the Bodil Award for Best Danish Film of 1955. Over the next several years, Methling made a series of popular war comedies, the Soldaterkammerater movies (Soldier Buddies). In 1959, Methling directed the surreal comedy Vi er allesammen tossede (We are Altogether Crazy) for which he was again awarded the Bodil Award for Best Danish Film. During the 1960s, Methling began writing screenplays as well as directing, and his name became synonymous with light-hearted comedies.

In 1966, Methling became a teacher at the National Film School of Denmark and he was employed as a consultant at the Danish Film Institute from 1979 to 1981. In the 1990s Methling returned to directing with the popular comedy films, The Crumbs (Krummerne). Methling died in Copenhagen, Denmark on 7 August 2005.

== Filmography (selected) ==
Year	Film	Position	Other notes
1944	Det Store Ansvar	Actor... Jens the Skipper	
1953	The Crime of Tove Andersen	Director	
1953	Hejrenæs	Director	
1955	Der kom en dag	Director	Bodil Award for Best Danish Film
1957	Englen i sort	Director	
1958	Soldaterkammerater	Director	
1958	Ung Kærlighed	Producer	
1959	Vi er allesammen tossede	Director	Bodil Award for Best Danish Film
1959	3 må man være	Director	
1959	Soldaterkammerater rykker ud	Director	
1959	Ballade på Bullerborg	Director	
1960	Soldaterkammerater på vagt	Director	
1961	Soldaterkammerater på efterårsmanøvre	Director	
1961	Mine tossede drenge	Director	
1961	Sorte Shara	Director	
1962	Soldaterkammerater på sjov	Director writer editor	
1963	Pigen og pressefotografen	Director	
1963	Et døgn uden løgn	Director	
1963	Syd for Tana River	Co-Director	
1964	Majorens oppasser	Director editor	
1964	5 Mand og Rosa	Writer director	
1964	Når ended er go'	Director	
1965	Passer passer piger	Writer director	
1966	Gys og gæve tanter	Writer director	
1966	Dyden går amok	Writer director	
1967	Smukke-Arne og Rosa	Writer director	
1968	Jeg elsker blåt	Writer director	
1970	Nøglen til Paradis	Director	
1972	Familien med de 100 børn	Director editor	
1972	Takt og tome i himmelsengen	Writer director editor	
1976	Brand-Børge rykker ud	Writer	
1976	Familien Gyldenkål sprænger banken	Editor	
1979	Charly og Steffen	Editor	
1982	Kidnapning	Writer editor	
1982	Tre engle og fem løver	Writer director	
1985	Walter og Carlo – op på fars hat	Editor	
1987	Kampen om den røde ko	Producer	
1988	Elvis Hansen	Producer	
1989	Den røde tråd	Producer editor	
1990	Bananen	Producer editor	
1991	Krummerne	Director	Won Starboy Award at the Oulu International Children's Film Festival
1992	Krummerne 2	Director	
1994	Vildbassen	Director	
1994	Krummerne 3	Director	
