= The Story of a Mother (1979 film) =

1979 film

- Directed by: Claus Weeke
- Written by: Hans Christian Andersen; Paul Gégauff
- Produced by: Claus Weeke
- Starring: Anna Karina
- Cinematography: Dirk Brüel
- Edited by: Lars Brydesen
- Release date: 6 November 1979
- Running time: 52 minutes
- Country: Denmark
- Language: Danish

The Story of a Mother (Danish: Historien om en moder) is a 1979 Danish drama film directed by Claus Weeke and starring Anna Karina. It is an adaptation of the Hans Christian Andersen short story of the same name.

== Cast ==
- Anna Karina as Christine Olsen
- Gustaf Hagström as Barnet
- Daniel Duval as Døden
- Tove Maës as Lærerinden
- Bodil Udsen as Portnerkonen
- Finn Nielsen as Afdelingslederen
- Benny Hansen as Købmanden
- Judy Gringer as Christines kollega
- Sanne Salomonsen as Christines kollega
- Rita Angela as Christines kollega
- Jørn Faurschou as Agitator
- Gertie Jung as Kvinde, der kysser agitatoren
