= Helle Virkner =

Danish actress (1925–2009)

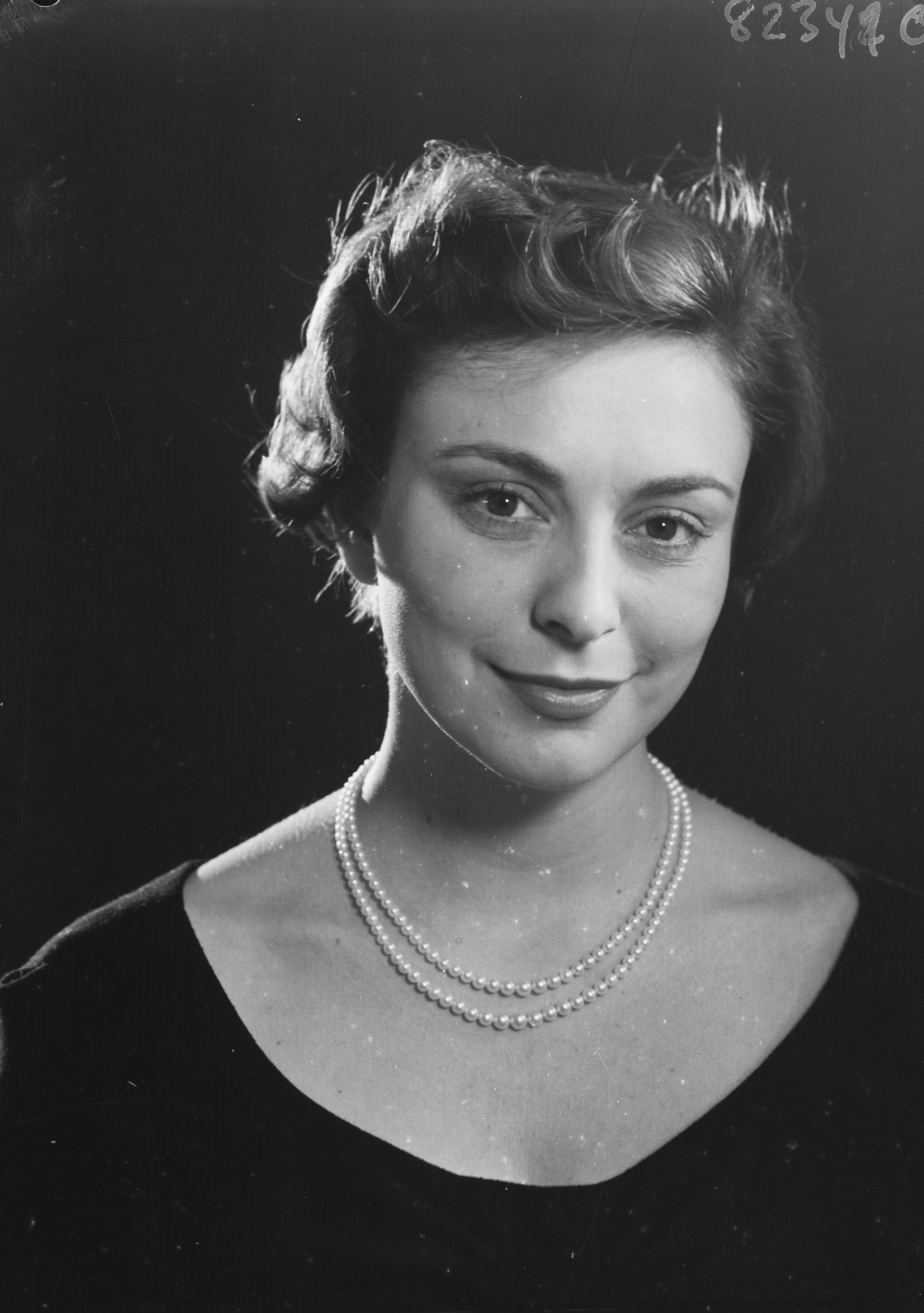
- Born: Helle Genie Lotinga; 15 September 1925; Aarhus, Denmark
- Died: 10 June 2009 (aged 83); Charlottenlund, Denmark
- Occupations: Actress, author
- Years active: 1944–2003
- Spouses: William Rosenberg (m. 1944; div. 1949) Ebbe Rode (m. 1949; div. 1958) Jens Otto Krag (m. 1959; div. 1973)
- Children: 2

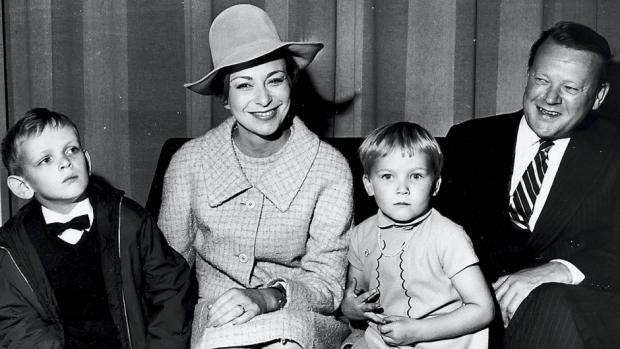
Virkner with Krag and children in 1971

Helle Genie Virkner née Lotinga (15 September 1925 – 10 June 2009) was a Danish actress, author and spouse of Prime Minister Jens Otto Krag.

== Personal life ==
Helle Genie Lotinga was born in Aarhus to Jewish rentier Moritz Lotinga and Ellen Larsine (née Rasmussen). Her parents divorced when she was 5, at which point she moved with her mother from Ry to Copenhagen. Her paternal family escaped to Sweden in 1943. Helle changed her last name from Lotinga to Virkner in 1944.

Helle Virkner was married three times. First to actor William Rosenberg (1920–2014), then to actor Ebbe Rode (1910–1998). Her third marriage was to Danish Prime Minister Jens Otto Krag (1914–1978), with whom she had two children. Her daughter Astrid Helene 'Søsser' Krag, a journalist and former model, died on 5 July 2014, 51 years old. Helle and Søsser lived together in Charlottenlund in the last years of Helle's life.

== Career ==
Virkner's career began in 1944, and two years later she appeared at the Royal Danish Theatre. She eventually left her mark on the acting scene in a string of popular films and television series, including a significant role as Elisabeth Friis in the Danish TV series Matador. Her career ended in 2003.

== Death ==
She died at her home in the Copenhagen suburb of Charlottenlund, from cancer, aged 83.

== Filmography ==
- Frihed, lighed og Louise – 1944
- Otte akkorder – 1944
- Spurve under taget – 1944
- Så mødes vi hos Tove – 1946
- My name is Petersen – 1947
- Ta', hvad du vil ha' – 1947
- Penge som græs – 1948
- Hvor er far? – 1948
- For frihed og ret – 1949
- Solstik – 1953
- Hendes store aften – 1954
- Himlen er blå – 1954
- Bruden fra Dragstrup – 1955
- På tro og love – 1955
- Kispus – 1956
- Tante Tut fra Paris – 1956
- Amor i telefonen – 1957
- Englen i sort – 1957
- Mor skal giftes – 1958
- Over alle grænser – 1958
- Poeten og Lillemor – 1959
- Tre må man være – 1959
- Onkel Bill fra New York – 1959
- Poeten og Lillemor og Lotte – 1960
- Cirkus Buster – 1961
- Poeten og Lillemor i forårshumør – 1961
- Støv på hjernen – 1961
- Det støver stadig – 1962
- Den kære familie – 1962
- Støv for alle pengene – 1963
- Peters landlov – 1963
- Døden kommer til middag – 1964
- Landmandsliv – 1965
- Passer passer piger – 1965
- Mor bag rattet – 1965
- Gys og gæve tanter – 1966
- Det var en lørdag aften – 1968
- The Only Way – 1970
- Rend mig i revolutionen – 1970
- Tjærehandleren – 1971
- Olsen-banden i Jylland – 1971
- Ballade på Christianshavn – 1971
- Olsen-bandens store kup – 1972
- Olsen-banden går amok – 1973
- Nitten røde roser – 1974
- Kassen stemmer – 1976
- Pas på ryggen, professor – 1977
- Matador (TV series) – 1978–81
- De uanstændige – 1983
- Riget 1 – 1994
- Riget 2 – 1997
- Blinkende lygter – 2000
- Trækfugle – 2001
- Se dagens lys – 2003
