= The Son (1953 film) =

1953 film

- Directed by: Torben Anton Svendsen
- Written by: Leck Fischer
- Produced by: John Hilbert
- Starring: Ib Schønberg; Lise Wolst; Frits Helmuth
- Cinematography: Henning Bendtsen; Einar Olsen
- Music by: Hans Schreiber
- Production company: Nordisk Film
- Release date: 17 August 1953
- Running time: 87 minutes
- Country: Denmark
- Language: Danish

The Son (Danish: Sønnen) is a 1953 Danish family film directed by Torben Anton Svendsen and starring Ib Schønberg, Lise Wolst and Frits Helmuth.

== Cast ==
- Ib Schønberg as Krovært Christian Christiansen
- Lise Wolst as Sonja
- Frits Helmuth as Simon
- Kate Mundt as Ketty
- Gunnar Lauring as Tømmerhandleren 'Kongen'
- Karin Nellemose as Fru Rudi
- Inge Hvid-Møller as Anna
- Kjeld Jacobsen as Max
- Hans-Henrik Krause as Niels
- Karl Stegger as Kriminalbetjent
- Maria Garland as Marie
- Elith Pio as Kredslægen
- Aage Winther-Jørgensen as Sofus
- Preben Lerdorff Rye as Generalen
- Inge Ketti as Søster
- Bodil Lindorff as Laurine
- Jakob Nielsen as Overbetjent
- Poul Secher as Stoffer
- Victor Montell as Værten
- Poul Juhl as Eksportør
- Paul Hagen as Salgschauffør
- Jytte Ibsen as En ung mor
- Henry Nielsen

== Bibliography ==
- Morten Piil. Gyldendals danske filmguide. Gyldendal A/S, 2008.
