= Astrid Villaume =

Danish actress (1923–1995)

- Born: 3 November 1923; Aalestrup, Denmark
- Died: 12 February 1995 (aged 71); Frederiksberg, Denmark
- Years active: 1940–1990
- Spouse: Carl Magnus von Staffeldt (1947–1959)

Astrid Villaume (3 November 1923 – 12 February 1995) was a Danish actress of stage and film best known for her Bodil Award-winning title role in the 1950 film Susanne. Danish film historian Morten Piil described Villaume's appeal as a combination of "warm mother figure, romantic heroine and innocent erotic dream girl."

== Early life ==
Astrid Villaume, the daughter of a pharmacist, was born 3 November 1923 in Aalestrup near Viborg, Denmark. While in her late teens, Villaume performed as an acrobat in Danish revues. She attended the drama school at the Odense Theater from 1939 to 1941, and made her debut on stage there in the play Under Krigen (English: In The War). She enjoyed success as a stage actress during the next six years, however she applied to return to the drama school at the Det Kongelige Teater (Royal Danish Theatre) in 1947. After an audition, she was accepted and attended classes another two years. When asked why she would want to attend drama school twice, Villaume said simply, "Because I thought I needed it."

== Career ==
She debuted at the Royal Danish Theatre in the role of Stine Isenkræmmer in Barselsstuen and from July 1949 Villaume was permanently employed there. Over the years she performed a variety of roles including Mary Tyrone in Long Days Journey into Night, the title role in Anna Sophie Hedvig, Magdalone in Mascarade, and Linda Loman in Death of a Salesman. Villaume also enjoyed great popularity as a film actress. For her first leading role, as the beautiful baker's daughter in the 1950 film Susanne, Villaume was awarded the Bodil for Best Actress. Villaume went on to perform in 39 films as well as television and radio; one of her films, Qivitoq, was nominated for the Academy Award for Best Foreign Film. She also provided the voices for the Danish language versions of Disney's Alice in Wonderland and Peter Pan.

== Personal life ==
Villaume married the businessman Carl Magnus von Staffeldt on 11 February 1947. Her husband died in 1959 while she was pregnant with their third child. Astrid Villaume died on 12 February 1995 at the age of 71. She was buried in the Frederiksberg Churchyard in Copenhagen.

== Filmography ==
- Pas på svinget i Solby – 1940
- Tyrannens fald – 1942
- Hans store aften – 1946
- Far betaler – 1946
- Susanne – 1950
- Fireogtyve timer – 1951
- Fra den gamle købmandsgård – 1951
- Vi arme syndere – 1952
- To minutter for sent – 1952
- Adam og Eva – 1953
- Hejrenæs – 1953
- Arvingen – 1954
- Der kom en dag – 1955
- På tro og love – 1955
- Tre finder en kro – 1955
- Qivitoq – 1956
- Flintesønnerne – 1956
- Amor i telefonen – 1957
- Mariannes bryllup – 1958
- Vagabonderne på Bakkegården – 1958
- Det skete på Møllegården – 1960
- Flemming og Kvik – 1960
- Flemming på kostskole – 1961
- Der brænder en ild – 1962
- Det stod i avisen – 1962
- Et døgn uden løgn – 1963
- Premiere i helvede – 1964
- Gift – 1966
- Der var engang en krig – 1966
- Brødrene på Uglegården – 1967
- Der kom en soldat – 1969
- De fem og spionerne – 1969
- De fem i fedtefadet – 1970
- Bejleren – en jysk røverhistorie – 1975
- Verden er fuld af børn – 1980
- Den ubetænksomme elsker – 1982
- Pelle the Conqueror – 1987
- Lad isbjørnene danse – 1990

== Awards ==
- Bodil Award (1951)
- Ole Haslunds legat
- Poul Reumerts legat
- Henkel-prisen (1972)
- Tagea Brandts Rejselegat
- Olaf Poulsens Mindelegat
- Johanne Louise Heibergs Legat
