= Christian (1989 film) =

- Directed by: Gabriel Axel
- Cinematography: Morten Bruus
- Music by: Chaddati Abdelkebir
- Release date: 1989

Christian is a 1989 Danish drama film directed by Gabriel Axel. It was entered into the main competition at the 46th Venice International Film Festival.

== Cast ==
- Nikolaj Christensen as Christian
- Nathalie Brusse as Aïcha
- Preben Lerdorff Rye as The Grandfather
- Jens Arentzen as Johnny
- Else Petersen
