= Beatrice Bonnesen =

Danish actress (1906–1979)

- Born: 21 October 1906; Copenhagen, Denmark
- Died: 19 January 1979 (aged 72); Denmark
- Occupation: Actress
- Years active: 1926-1974

Beatrice Bonnesen (21 October 1906 – 19 January 1979) was a Danish film actress. She appeared in 21 films between 1926 and 1974. She was born in Copenhagen, Denmark and died in Denmark. She was the daughter of mathematician Tommy Bonnesen.

== Filmography ==
- Det sovende hus (1926)
- Tretten aar (1932)
- Rasmines bryllup (1935)
- Balletten danser (1938)
- Barnet (1940)
- En forbryder (1941)
- Tag det som en mand (1941)
- Ballade i Nyhavn (1942)
- Baby på eventyr (1942)
- Mine kære koner (1943)
- Familien Gelinde (1944)
- Mens sagføreren sover (1945)
- The Swedenhielm Family (1947)
- Hatten er sat (1947)
- Hændte i København, Det (1949)
- Adam og Eva (1953)
- Tre finder en kro (1955)
- Mor skal giftes (1958)
- Farlig sommer (1969)
- Laila Løvehjerte (1972)
- Den sårede Filoktet (1974)
