= An Artist of Life =

1925 film

- Directed by: Holger-Madsen
- Written by: Käthe Lucie Günther; Holger-Madsen; Richard Voß (novel)
- Starring: Erna Morena; Grete Mosheim
- Production company: National Film
- Distributed by: National Film
- Release date: September 1925 (Germany)
- Country: Germany
- Languages: Silent; German intertitles

An Artist of Life (German: Ein Lebenskünstler) is a 1925 German silent film directed by Holger-Madsen and starring Erna Morena and Grete Mosheim.

The film's sets were designed by the art director Alfred Junge.

== Cast ==
In alphabetical order

- Paul Bildt
- Olaf Fjord
- Robert Garrison
- Marie Grimm-Einödshofer
- Friedrich Kayßler
- Erna Morena
- Grete Mosheim
- Holger Reenberg
- Frida Richard

== Bibliography ==
- Bock, Hans-Michael; Bergfelder, Tim, eds. (2009). The Concise Cinegraph: Encyclopaedia of German Cinema. New York: Berghahn Books. ISBN 978-1-57181-655-9.
