= The Heritage (film) =

1978 film

- Directed by: Anders Refn
- Written by: Flemming Quist Møller; Anders Refn; Gustav Wied
- Produced by: Just Betzer
- Starring: Jens Okking
- Cinematography: Mikael Salomon
- Edited by: Merete Brusendorf
- Release date: 26 December 1978
- Running time: 118 minutes
- Country: Denmark
- Language: Danish

The Heritage (Danish: Slægten) is a 1978 Danish drama film directed by Anders Refn and starring Jens Okking.

== Cast ==
- Jens Okking - Helmuth
- Helle Hertz - Alvilda
- Bodil Udsen - Juliane
- Stefan Ekman - Grev Scheele
- Poul Reichhardt - Adolf Mascani
- Birgit Sadolin - Johanne Mascani
- Stine Bierlich - Karen
- Anne Marie Helger - Frøken Jansen
- Masja Dessau - Clara Mascani
- Allan Olsen - Julius
- Otte Svendsen - Tjener Niels
- Folmer Rubæk - Forvalter Rasmus
- Ulla Lock - Stasia
- Inger Stender - Kammerjomfru
- Judy Gringer - Maren
- Elin Reimer - Stine
- Else-Marie - Amalie (as Else Marie Juul Hansen)
- Claus Strandberg - Jakob
- Bendt Rothe - Herredsfoged
