= Grethe Thordahl =

Danish actress

- Born: 11 December 1926; Ingerselv, Aarhus Municipality, Denmark
- Died: 29 June 2004 (aged 78); Denmark

Grethe Thordahl (11 December 1926 – 29 June 2004) was a Danish stage and film actress. She competed in the Dansk Melodi Grand Prix on 15 February 1964 at the Tivoli Concert Hall, performing the song "Polka i Grand Prix", which she sang with Fredrik but did not place in the top three.

== Filmography ==
- Far betaler (1946)
- Mani (1947)
- Kampen mod uretten (1949)
- Smedestræde 4 (1950)
- Det sande ansigt (1951)
- Fodboldpræsten (1951)
- Husmandstøsen (1952)
- To minutter for sent (1952)
- Tine (1964)
- Bejleren - en jysk røverhistorie (1975)
