= Jørgen Ryg =

Danish actor (1927–1981)

- Born: 11 August 1927; Copenhagen, Denmark
- Died: 28 August 1981 (aged 54); Denmark
- Occupation: Actor
- Years active: 1954–1978

Jørgen Ryg (11 August 1927 – 28 August 1981) was a Danish comedian, jazz musician (trumpeter) and actor. Best known for his comical monologues on stage, he also appeared in 37 films between 1954 and 1978. He won the Bodil Award for Best Actor in a Supporting Role for his role as adjutant Mühlhauser in Lenin, You Rascal, You.

== Filmography ==
- Sukceskomponisten (1954)
- Tante Tut fra Paris (1956)
- Vi som går stjernevejen (1956)
- Krudt og klunker (1958)
- Kærlighedens melodi (1959)
- Frihedens pris (1960)
- Forelsket i København (1960)
- Løgn og løvebrøl (1961)
- To skøre ho'der (1961)
- Det tossede paradis (1962)
- En af dagene (1963)
- Med lov skal bro bygges (1963)
- Vi har det jo dejligt (1963)
- Skyggen af en helt (1963)
- Selvmordsskolen (1964)
- Don Olsen kommer til byen (1964)
- I, a Lover (1966)
- Nu stiger den (1966)
- Forstyr ikke mine cirkler (1966)
- Tre mand frem for en trold (1967)
- Husk postnummer (1967)
- Må jeg lege med (1968)
- Något att tala om i framtiden (1968)
- Glassplinten (1969)
- Nøglen til paradis (1970)
- Automobilkirkegården (1971)
- Lenin, din gavtyv (1972)
- Nu går den på Dagmar (1972)
- Hashtræet (1973)
- En forglemmelse (1973)
- Friere (1973)
- Den kyske levemand (1974)
- Syg og munter (1974)
- Julefrokosten (1976)
- Alt på et bræt (1977)
- Firmaskovturen (1978)
- Fængslende feriedage (1978)
