= Paradise and Back =

1964 film by Gabriel Axel

- Poster by John Stevenov
- Directed by: Gabriel Axel
- Written by: Peter Ronild
- Produced by: Finn Henriksen
- Starring: Poul Reichhardt
- Cinematography: Jørgen Skov
- Music by: Bent Fabricius-Bjerre
- Distributed by: Nordisk Film
- Release date: 21 February 1964
- Running time: 93 minutes
- Country: Denmark
- Language: Danish

Paradise and Back (Danish: Paradis retur, lit. 'Return to Paradise') is a 1964 Danish family film directed by Gabriel Axel and starring Poul Reichhardt.

== Cast ==
- Poul Reichhardt – Tonnemann
- Lise Ringheim – the lady
- Nina Larsen - Mona – 11 years old
- Elsebeth Reingaard - Mona – 16 years old
- Winnie Sørensen - Mona – 36 years old
- Henning Olsen - Tom – 11 years old
- Christoffer Bro - Tom – 16 years old
- Poul Clemmensen – Tom – 36 years old
- Kjeld Jacobsen – Børge
- Kirsten Søberg - Sonja
- Preben Lerdorff Rye – actor
- Erik Paaske – Karl
- Guri Richter – Lilian
- Emil Halberg - guard
- Ove Rud – resistance fighter
- Kirsten Walther – Lajla
- Jakob Nielsen (actor) - Spritter
- Professor Tribini - funfair owner
- Niels Skousen – Alex
- Knud Rasmussen
- Svend Johansen – officer
- Ruth Hermann - Jew
- Aage Fønss – neighbor
- Einar Juhl – retired colonel
