= Willy Breinholst =

Danish writer

- Born: 27 June 1918; Fredensborg, Denmark
- Died: 19 September 2009 (aged 91)
- Occupations: Author, screenwriter, humorist
- Years active: 1945–76

Willy Breinholst (27 June 1918 – 19 September 2009) was a Danish author, screenwriter, and humorist born in Fredensborg, Denmark.

== Filmography ==
- Summer and Sinners (1960)
- Elsk... din næste! (1967)
- Mig og min lillebror og storsmuglerne (1968)
- Mig og min lillebror og Bølle (1969)
