= Jørgen Skov =

Danish cinematographer (1925–2001)

- Born: 12 November 1925; Copenhagen, Denmark
- Died: 28 March 2001 (aged 75)
- Occupation: Cinematographer
- Years active: 1949-1974

Jørgen Skov (12 November 1925 – 28 March 2001) was a Danish cinematographer. He worked on nearly 50 films between 1949 and 1974. He won the Silver Prize for Photography for the film Den kære familie at the 3rd Moscow International Film Festival in 1963.

== Selected filmography ==
- Meet Me on Cassiopeia (1951)
- To minutter for sent (1952)
- På tro og love (1955)
- Pigen og vandpytten (1958)
- The Girls Are Willing (1958)
- Helle for Helene (1959)
- The Poet and the Little Mother (1959)
- Poeten og Lillemor og Lotte (1960)
- Poeten og Lillemor i forårshumør (1961)
- Den kære familie (1963)
- Hvis lille pige er du? (1963)
- Three Girls in Paris (1963)
- Death Comes at High Noon (1964)
- Paradise and Back (1964)
- Summer in Tyrol (1964)
- Landmandsliv (1965)
- Relax Freddie (1966)
- I Belong to Me (1967)
- Martha (1967)
- Mig og min lillebror og storsmuglerne (1968)
- We Are All Demons (1969)
- The Olsen Gang in a Fix (1969)
- Ballade på Christianshavn (1971)
- The Olsen Gang's Big Score (1972)
