= På tro og love =

1955 film

- Theatrical poster by Aage Lundvald
- Directed by: Torben Anton Svendsen
- Written by: Erik Balling; Knud Poulsen
- Produced by: Erik Balling
- Starring: Poul Reichhardt
- Cinematography: Verner Jensen; Jørgen Skov
- Edited by: Carsten Dahl
- Distributed by: Nordisk Film
- Release date: 19 August 1955
- Running time: 90 minutes
- Country: Denmark
- Language: Danish

På tro og love is a 1955 Danish family film directed by Torben Anton Svendsen and starring Poul Reichhardt.

== Cast ==
- Poul Reichhardt as Hans
- Astrid Villaume as Grete
- Helge Kjærulff-Schmidt as Georg
- Gunnar Lauring as Chefen
- Helle Virkner as Vera Gimmer
- Lis Løwert as Solveig
- Ove Sprogøe as Henry
- Sigrid Horne-Rasmussen as Fru Gimmer
- Louis Miehe-Renard as Frederiksen
- Einar Juhl as Revisor
- Carl Johan Hviid as Portieren
- Birgit Sadolin as Telefonpige
- Else Kornerup as Kontordame
- Mogens Lind as Speaker
- Edith Hermansen as Klinikassistent
