= Adam and Eve (1953 film) =

1953 film by Erik Balling

Adam og Eva
- Theatrical release poster by Kai Rasch
- Directed by: Erik Balling
- Written by: Erik Balling
- Produced by: John Hilbert
- Starring: Louis Miehe-Renard; Sonja Jensen
- Cinematography: Poul Pedersen
- Music by: Hans Schreiber
- Distributed by: Nordisk Film Kompagni
- Release date: 1953
- Running time: 99 minutes
- Country: Denmark
- Language: Danish

Adam and Eve (Danish: Adam og Eva) is a 1953 Danish comedy written and directed by Erik Balling. The film was awarded the 1954 Bodil Award for Best Danish Film and Per Buckhøj won the Bodil Award for Best Actor for his role as the zealous schoolteacher.

== Plot ==
On the way home from a conference in Paris, Mr. Johansen accidentally finds himself in possession of an insignificant little French book. He has no idea where the book came from or what it concerns, but he decides he should secretly smuggle it through customs. Thereafter, the book passes through the hands of 5 different people, and causes unexpected conflicts, suspicions and misunderstandings for each of them.

== Cast ==
- Louis Miehe-Renard – Adam
- Sonja Jensen – Eva
- Per Buckhøj – Sven Aage Johansen
- Inger Lassen – Adam's mother
- Gunnar Lauring – Claus' father
- Beatrice Bonnesen – Claus' mother
- Bertel Lauring – Claus
- Einar Juhl – Adam's Teacher
- Birgitte Reimer – Peter's secretary
- Poul Reichhardt – Peter
- Astrid Villaume – Peter's wife
- Asbjørn Andersen – Carl Henriksen
- Karin Nellemose – Carl's wife
- Bjørn Watt Boolsen – Larsen
- Preben Lerdorff Rye – Burglar
- Lis Løwert – Prostitute
- Poul Müller – Antique dealer
- Birgitte Federspiel – Antique dealer's wife
- Emil Hass Christensen – Reverend
- Henning Moritzen – Customs agent
- John Wittig – Aagaard
- Bendt Rothe – Defender
- Karl Stegger – Man on the street
- Ellen Margrethe Stein – Judge Lauersen
- Ebbe Langberg – Classmate
- Jørgen Buckhøj – Classmate
- Otto Detlefsen – Judge
