= Poeten og Lillemor i forårshumør =

1961 film

- Directed by: Erik Balling
- Written by: Erik Balling
- Produced by: Carl Rald
- Starring: Henning Moritzen
- Cinematography: Jørgen Skov
- Edited by: Birger Lind
- Distributed by: Nordisk Film
- Release date: 11 September 1961
- Running time: 100 minutes
- Country: Denmark
- Language: Danish

Poeten og Lillemor i forårshumør is a 1961 Danish comedy film directed by Erik Balling and starring Henning Moritzen, who plays a poet with a writer's block.

== Cast ==
- Henning Moritzen as Poeten
- Helle Virkner as Lillemor
- Eva Hast Nystad as Lotte (as Eva Nystad)
- Ove Sprogøe as Anton
- Lis Løwert as Vera
- Anders Thornberg as Tvilling
- Kristian Thornberg as Tvilling
- Karl Stegger as Slagteren
- Bodil Udsen as Jordmoderen
- Dirch Passer as Bageren
- Judy Gringer as Bagerjomfru Lise
- Poul Bundgaard as Bagersvenden
- Helge KjærulffasSchmidt as Bilforhandleren
- Palle Huld as Rejseføreren
- Birte Bang as Forårspigen
- Suzanne Bech as Pinasup girl
- Carl Ottosen as Togpassager
- Kirsten Passer as Togpassager
