= Life on the Hegn Farm =

1938 film

- Poster by Aage Lundvald
- Directed by: Arne Weel; Lau Lauritzen Jr. Alice O'Fredericks
- Written by: Jeppe Aakjær; Fleming Lynge; Svend Rindom
- Produced by: Arne Weel
- Starring: Holger Reenberg
- Cinematography: Karl Andersson
- Edited by: Marie Ejlersen
- Release date: 3 October 1938
- Running time: 90 minutes
- Country: Denmark
- Language: Danish

Life on the Hegn Farm (Danish: Livet paa Hegnsgaard) is a 1938 Danish family film directed by Arne Weel, Lau Lauritzen Jr. and Alice O'Fredericks. It is based on a 1907 play by Danish writer Jeppe Aakjær. Weel directed a Swedish remake The People of Högbogården in 1939.

== Cast ==
- Holger Reenberg - Wolle Rævsgaard
- Willy Bille - Karen Rævsgaard
- Karin Nellemose - Trine Rævsgaard
- Peter S. Andersen - Gamle Kræn Rævsgaard
- Carl Heger - Visti Andersen
- Axel Frische - Per Søwren
- Sigrid Neiiendam - Ane Søwren
- Erik Henning-Jensen - Gaardejer 'Hellig-Mads' Villadsen
- Carlo Wieth - Proprietær Nørholm
- Kai Paaske - Gaardejer Esper Vøvtrup
- Sigurd Wantzin - Gaardejer Søren Østergaard
- Petrine Sonne - Bitte-fip
- Jakob Nielsen - Forkarlen Anders
- Alfred Bagger - Røgteren Søren
- Karen Marie Løwert - Mette
- Carl Lundbeck - Slagter Ræber
- Kai Holm - Kromand Sigvaldsen
