= Peters landlov =

1963 film

- Directed by: Ebbe Langberg
- Written by: Tørk Haxthausen
- Produced by: Poul Bang
- Starring: Ebbe Langberg
- Cinematography: Aage Wiltrup
- Edited by: Lizzi Weischenfeldt
- Release date: 28 June 1963
- Running time: 74 minutes
- Country: Denmark
- Language: Danish

Peters landlov is a 1963 Danish family film directed by and starring Ebbe Langberg.

== Cast ==
- Ebbe Langberg as Sandy
- Christoffer Bro as Peter
- Jimmie Moore as Billy
- Poul Reichhardt as Hr. Berg
- Helle Virkner as Minna Berg
- Ulla Pia as Lisbeth Berg
- Jan Priiskorn-Schmidt as Thomas Berg
- Ove Sprogøe as Direktør William H. Schmidt
- Emil Hass Christensen as Landsretssagfører Johansen
- Minna Jørgensen as Kokkepigen Marie
- Carl Ottosen as Kaptajn
- Ole Gundermann as Jakob
