= Tre må man være =

1959 film

- Directed by: Sven Methling
- Written by: Jens Locher; Fleming Lynge
- Produced by: Preben Philipsen
- Starring: Poul Reichhardt
- Cinematography: Kjeld Arnholtz
- Edited by: Edith Schlüssel
- Release date: 13 February 1959
- Running time: 80 minutes
- Country: Denmark
- Language: Danish

Tre må man være is a 1959 Danish family film directed by Sven Methling and starring Poul Reichhardt.

== Cast ==
- Poul Reichhardt - Peter Halling
- Helle Virkner - Elisabeth Halling
- Ghita Nørby - Kate Halling
- Preben Mahrt - Arkæolog Johannes Brodersen
- Ellen Gottschalch - Frk. Willumsen
- Ole Wisborg - Læge Erik Brinck
- Lily Weiding - Speaker
