= Crazy Paradise =

1962 film

- Poster by Arne Ungermann
- Directed by: Gabriel Axel
- Written by: Gabriel Axel; Ole Juul; Bob Ramsing
- Produced by: Erik Overbye
- Starring: Dirch Passer
- Cinematography: Henning Bendtsen
- Edited by: Lars Brydesen
- Music by: Ib Glindemann
- Distributed by: Film-Centralen-Palladium
- Release date: 27 July 1962
- Running time: 95 minutes
- Country: Denmark
- Language: Danish

Crazy Paradise (Danish: Det tossede paradis) is a 1962 Danish comedy film directed by Gabriel Axel and starring Dirch Passer and Ove Sprogøe .

== Cast ==
- Dirch Passer as Angelus Bukke
- Ove Sprogøe as Simon
- Hans W. Petersen as Thor Bukke
- Ghita Nørby as Edith Ibenholdt
- Paul Hagen as Vicar Poul Ibenholdt
- Bodil Steen as Minister Bertha Viginius
- Karl Stegger as Per Mortensen
- Kjeld Petersen as Ove Biermann
- Lily Broberg as Anne-Sofie
- Lone Hertz as Grete
- Judy Gringer as Ursula
- Kai Holm as Prime Minister Staldhybel
- Jørgen Ryg as Von Adel
- Axel Strøbye as Hjalmar
- Gunnar Lemvigh as Trommesen
- Poul Müller as Thomas Asmussen
- Valsø Holm as Janus
- Keld Markuslund as Disk
- Arthur Jensen as Trefrans
- Hugo Herrestrup as Frederik
- Gunnar Strømvad as Laurids
- Helge Scheuer as Jens
- Erik Paaske as Børge
- Lotte Tarp as Karen
- Elsebeth Larsen as Maren-Balle
- Henning Moritzen as Narrator / fortælleren
