= Judy Gringer =

Danish actress (born 1941)

- Born: 23 January 1941 (age 84); Copenhagen, Denmark
- Occupation: Actress
- Years active: 1958–present

Judy Gringer (born 23 January 1941) is a Danish film actress. She has appeared in 60 films since 1958. She was born in Copenhagen, Denmark.

== Filmography ==
- Til højre ved den gule hund (2003)
- Kærlighed ved første desperate blik (1994)
- Himmel og helvede (1988)
- Midt om natten (1984)
- Otto er et næsehorn (1983)
- Historien om en moder (1979)
- Slægten (1978)
- Firmaskovturen (1978)
- Familien Gyldenkål vinder valget (1977)
- Agent 69 Jensen i Skorpionens tegn (1977)
- Julefrokosten (1976)
- I Løvens tegn (1976)
- Nøddebo præstegård (1974)
- Den meget talende barber (1974)
- Prins Piwi (1974)
- Syg og munter (1974)
- Romantik på sengekanten (1973)
- Apollon fra Bellac (1973)
- Nu går den på Dagmar (1972)
- Dukkens død (1972)
- Lenin, din gavtyv (1972)
- Takt og tone i himmelsengen (1972)
- Min søsters børn, når de er værst (1971)
- Guld til præriens skrappe drenge (1971)
- Den afdøde (1971)
- Den gale dansker (1969)
- Dyrlægens plejebørn (1968)
- Sådan er de alle (1968)
- Smukke-Arne og Rosa (1967)
- Det er ikke appelsiner, det er heste (1967)
- Gift (1966)
- Ih, du forbarmende (1965)
- Fem mand og Rosa (1964)
- Når enden er go' (1964)
- Selvmordsskolen (1964)
- Majorens oppasser (1964)
- Et døgn uden løgn (1963)
- Sikke'n familie (1963)
- Hvis lille pige er du? (1963)
- Vi har det jo dejligt (1963)
- Pigen og pressefotografen (1963)
- Drømmen om det hvide slot (1962)
- Venus fra Vestø (1962)
- Oskar (1962)
- Det støver stadig (1962)
- Sømænd og svigermødre (1962)
- Det tossede paradis (1962)
- Poeten og Lillemor i forårshumør (1961)
- Peters baby (1961)
- Mine tossede drenge (1961)
- Sømand i knibe (1960)
- Poeten og Lillemor og Lotte (1960)
- Onkel Bill fra New York (1959)
- Poeten og Lillemor (1959)
- Vagabonderne på Bakkegården (1958)
- Mor skal giftes (1958)
- Soldaterkammerater (1958)
- Seksdagesløbet (1958)
- Verdens rigeste pige (1958)
- Guld og grønne skove (1958)
