= Carl Heger =

Danish actor (1910–2002)

- Born: 17 April 1910; Denmark
- Died: 2 May 2002 (aged 92); Denmark
- Occupation: Actor
- Years active: 1938-1956

Carl Heger (17 April 1910 – 2 May 2002) was a Danish actor. He appeared in more than 25 films between 1938 and 1956.

== Selected filmography ==
- Blaavand melder storm (1938)
- Life on the Hegn Farm (1938)
- The Burning Question (1943)
- The Viking Watch of the Danish Seaman (1948)
- Mosekongen (1950)
- Det Sande Ansigt (1951)
- Husmandstøsen (1952)
- The Old Mill on Mols (1953)
- Altid ballade (1955)
- Hejrenæs (1953)
