= Inger Lassen =

Danish actress (1911–1957)

- Born: 27 July 1911; Denmark
- Died: 30 December 1957 (aged 46); Denmark
- Occupation: Actress
- Years active: 1940-1957

Inger Lassen (27 July 1911 – 30 December 1957) was a Danish film actress. She appeared in 15 films between 1940 and 1957.

== Filmography ==
- Für zwei Groschen Zärtlichkeit (1957)
- Tre piger fra Jylland (1957)
- Der var engang en gade (1957)
- Kristiane af Marstal (1956)
- Kispus (1956)
- Bruden fra Dragstrup (1955)
- Der kom en dag (1955)
- Det er så yndigt at følges ad (1954)
- Karen, Maren og Mette (1954)
- Adam og Eva (1953)
- The Old Mill on Mols (1953)
- We Who Go the Kitchen Route (1953)
- Ved kongelunden... (1953)
- Peter Andersen (1941)
- Barnet (1940)
