= Inge Hvid-Møller =

Danish actress and stage director

Inge Hvid-Møller (1912–1970) was a Danish actress and stage director. She is remembered for performing roles in Jean Anouilh's plays, in particular the title role in Antigone in 1946. From the 1950s she directed plays including Chekhov's Onkel Vanja (1953) at the Allé-Scenen. Hvid-Møller also performed in several films, including Jeg mødte en Morder (1943).

== Biography ==
Born in Copenhagen on 6 October 1912, Inge Hvid-Møller was the daughter of the high-court attorney Johannes Hvid-Møller (1885–1959) and his wife Elna Johanne Henriette Bentzen (1884–1950). In 1941, she married the actor Hans-Henrik Krause. The marriage was dissolved in 1946. She trained at the Royal Theatre School (1932–34) and made her debut in 1935 as Esther in Henri Nathansen Indenfor Murene (Inside the Walls) in 1936.

Hvid-Møller played a number of dark tragic roles in the theatres of Copenhagen and the provinces. After a year with the Dagmarteater, she performed in Aalborg (1937–39) and Aarhus (1939–42) where she played Constance Leth in Kaj Munk's Egelykke. She returned to Copenhagen for the remainder of the German occupation, spending most of her time at the Folketeatret where she played Eliza in George Bernard Shaw's Pygmalion.

In 1946, she was particularly successful as Antigone in Anouilh's play at the Allé-Scenen theatre. From 1950 to 1956, she was engaged by the Frederiksberg Teater where she starred as Prudence in Kameliadamen and took the title roles in Anouilh's plays Jeanne d'Arc and Medea. In the later 1950s and early 1960s, she devoted most of her time to direction, not only on the stage but also on television and radio. She staged Onkel Vanja at Allé Scenen and Nøgen at Riddersalen, also directing the latter as a TV production.

Inge Hvid-Møller died in the Frederiksberg district of Copenhagen on 18 February 1970.

== Filmography ==
Year	Title	Role	Director	Notes
1942	Naar bønder elsker	Kirsten	Arne Weel	
1943	Jeg mødte en morder	Annie	Lau Lauritzen	
1944	Otte akkorder	Gertrud Iversen/Fanny Thorsen	Johan Jacobsen	
1946	Brevet fra afdøde	Miss Steen	Johan Jacobsen	
1948	Hr. Petit	Bertha Gautier	Alice O'Fredericks	
1950	Cafe Paradis	Nora	Bodil Ipsen	
1953	Sønnen	Anna	Torben Anton Svendsen	
1954	Himlen er blå	Fortæller	Svend Aage Lorentz	
1955	Ild og Jord	Ellen	Kai Wilton	
