= Berit Erbe =

Berit Erbe (4 September 1923 – 13 May 2009) was a Danish-Norwegian actress and historian of theatre.

She was born in Oslo and died in Bergen. After her theatre education she worked at the Royal Danish Theatre in Copenhagen. She took a magister degree in theatre aesthetics and history in Copenhagen in 1959. She was hired as a lecturer at the University of Bergen in 1969, took the dr.philos. degree on a thesis about Bjørn Bjørnson in 1973, and served as a professor from 1975 to 1988. She was inducted into the Norwegian Academy of Science and Letters in 1983.

== Selected filmography ==
- The Crime of Tove Andersen (1953)
