= The Crime of Tove Andersen =

1953 film

- Directed by: Sven Methling
- Written by: John Olsen (play); Paul Sarauw (play)
- Produced by: John Olsen
- Starring: Preben Lerdorff Rye; Ib Schønberg; Else Jarlbak
- Cinematography: Kjeld Arnholtz
- Edited by: Anker Sørensen
- Music by: Børge Friis
- Production company: Saga Studio
- Release date: 7 January 1953
- Running time: 93 minutes
- Country: Denmark
- Language: Danish

The Crime of Tove Andersen (Danish: Kriminalsagen Tove Andersen) is a 1953 Danish crime film directed by Sven Methling and starring Preben Lerdorff Rye, Ib Schønberg and Else Jarlbak.

== Cast ==
- Preben Lerdorff Rye as Kriminalbetjent Knudsen
- Ib Schønberg as Kriminalbetjent Villumsen
- Else Jarlbak as Fru Villumsen
- Aage Winther-Jørgensen as Kriminalassistent
- Arthur Jensen as Sprit Ole
- Ove Sprogøe as Mælkemand Valde
- Karl Stegger as Værtshusholder
- Emil Hass Christensen as Apoteker
- Ellen Gottschalch as Portnerske Martha Christoffersen
- Svend Methling as Læge Ove Kampstrup
- Annemette Svendsen as Tove Andersen
- Preben Neergaard as Robert Koldberg
- Karen Berg as Fru Burdal
- Vera Gebuhr as Fru Burdals ældste datter
- Carl Ottosen as Bartender Olsen
- Jakob Nielsen as Hr. Andersen
- Ib Fürst
- Ernst Schou
- Adelhaid Nielsen as Toves mor
- Inga Thessen
- Kirsten Aller
- Tove Bang
- Berit Erbe
- Poul Jensen
- Anne Grete Hilding as Tove Andersens kusine
- Ebbe Langberg as Lærling

== Bibliography ==
- Tad Bentley Hammer. International film prizes: an encyclopedia. Garland, 1991.
