= Letter from the Dead =

1946 film by Johan Jacobsen

- Directed by: Johan Jacobsen
- Written by: Arvid Müller
- Produced by: Tage Nielsen
- Starring: Eyvind Johan-Svendsen
- Cinematography: Karl Andersson
- Edited by: Edith Schlüssel
- Release date: 28 October 1946
- Running time: 78 minutes
- Country: Denmark
- Language: Danish

The 1946 Danish film Letter from the Dead (Danish: Brevet fra afdøde) is a serial-killer mystery-thriller-romance directed by Johan Jacobsen. It was entered into the 1946 Cannes Film Festival.

== Cast ==
- Eyvind Johan-Svendsen as Læge Arne Lorentzen
- Gunnar Lauring as Arkitekt Poul Friis Henriksen
- Sonja Wigert as Gerd Lorentzen
- Inge Hvid-Møller as Frk. Steen
- Axel Frische as Thorsen
- Karin Nellemose as Vibeke
- Preben Lerdorff Rye as Actor
- Liselotte Bendix
- Povl Wøldike
- Paul Holck-Hofmann as Guard in Bunker
- Per Buckhøj
- Henry Nielsen as Tentholder at Dyrehavsbakken
- Professor Tribini as himself
- Carl Johan Hviid
- Minna Jørgensen
- Carl Johan Hviid
