= Bodil Udsen =

Danish actress (1925–2008)

- Born: 12 January 1925; Copenhagen, Denmark
- Died: 26 February 2008 (aged 83); Copenhagen, Denmark
- Years active: 1955–2008

Bodil Birgitte Udsen (12 January 1925 – 26 February 2008) was a Danish actress.

She was a student at the Rysensteen Gymnasium in Copenhagen in 1944 and entered film in 1955. She also worked extensively in Danish theatre and appeared in the Danish TV series Huset på Christianshavn as Emma from 1970 to 1977.

== Selected filmography ==
- Blændværk (1955) – Dame fra børneværnet
- Mig og min familie (1957) – Grete
- Styrmand Karlsen (1958) – Olga
- Kvindelist og kærlighed (1960) – Gerda Høg Hansen
- Poeten og Lillemor og Lotte (1960) – The midwife
- Eventyrrejsen (1960) – Fru Bertelsen
- Sommerlandet (1961) – Speaker (voice)
- Poeten og Lillemor i forårshumør (1961) – Jordmoderen
- Støv på hjernen (1961) – Rigmor Hansen
- Eventyr på Mallorca (1961) – 'Fruggi' Berthelsen
- Flemming på kostskole (1961) – Økonoma frk. Svendsen
- Det støver stadig (1962) – Fru Rigmor Hansen
- Der brænder en ild (1962) – Marie
- Vi har det jo dejligt (1963) – Opfinderens kone
- Frøken April (1963) – Fru Rasmussen
- Støv for alle pengene (1963) – Fru Rigmor
- Selvmordsskolen (1964) – Sundhedsplejerske
- Don Olsen kommer til byen (1964) – Enken
- Mor bag rattet (1965) – Lillemus (Fru Mortensen)
- Tre små piger (1966) – Fru. Munke
- Onkel Joakims hemmelighed (1967) – Mona Lisa (uncredited)
- Far laver sovsen (1967) – Tante Karla
- Jeg elsker blåt (1968) – Tante Kamma
- Sjov i gaden (1969) – Hans sure kone
- Damernes ven (1969) – Emili Jonsen
- Huset på Christianshavn (1970–1977)
- Ballade på Christianshavn (1971) – Emma
- Revolutionen i vandkanten (1971) – Gigoloens pige
- Lenin, din gavtyv (1972) – En tysk socialdemokrat
- Livsens Ondskab (1972, TV Mini-Series) – Stine
- Mor, jeg har patienter (1972) – Johnnys mor
- Manden på Svanegården (1972) – Cathrine
- Aladdin eller den forunderlige lampe (1975–1976, TV Mini-Series) – Morgiane
- Den korte sommer (1976) – Kirstens mor
- Slægten (1978)
- Matador (1978–1981)
- Historien om en moder (1979)
- Min farmors hus (1984)
- Samson og Sally (1984)
- Peter von Scholten (1987)
- Baby Doll (1988)
- Gøngehøvdingen (1992)
- Family Matters (1993)
- Aberne og det hemmelige våben (1995)
- Bryggeren (1996–1997)
- Barbara (1997)
- Send mere slik (2001)
- Monas Verden (2001)
- Trækfugle (2001)
- Jeg er Dina (2002)
- Nissernes Ø (2003)
- Den du frygter (2008)
