= Den kære familie =

1962 film

- Poster by Aage Lundvald
- Directed by: Erik Balling
- Written by: Gustav Esmann
- Starring: Gunnar Lauring
- Cinematography: Arne Abrahamsen
- Release date: 3 August 1962
- Running time: 109 minutes
- Country: Denmark
- Language: Danish

Den kære familie is a 1962 Danish comedy film directed by Erik Balling based on a play by Gustav Esmann. It was entered into the 3rd Moscow International Film Festival where cinematographer Jørgen Skov won a Silver Prize for photography.

== Cast ==
- Gunnar Lauring as Skibsreder Jacob Friis
- Lise Ringheim as Elise Randall
- Bjørn Watt-Boolsen as William Randall
- Helle Virkner as Emilie
- Jarl Kulle as Count Claes af Lejonstam
- Ghita Nørby as Ida Friis
- Ole Søltoft as Friis' søn
- Ebbe Langberg as Valdemar Nystrøm
- Henning Moritzen as Alex Maagenhjelm
- Keld Markuslund as von Schildpadde
- Buster Larsen as Ludwig
