= Holger Reenberg =

Danish actor (1872–1942)

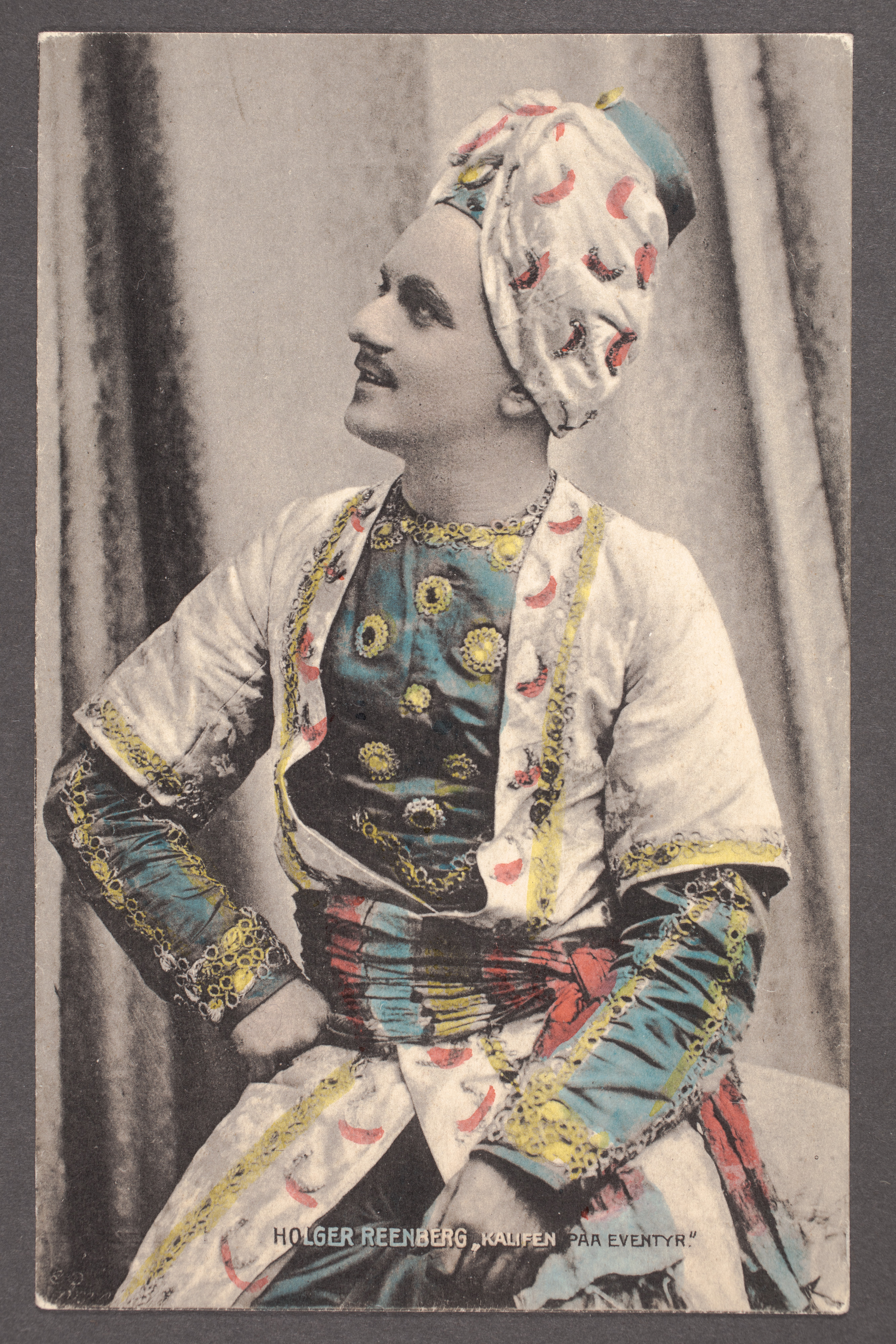
- Born: 3 September 1872; Denmark
- Died: 21 March 1942 (aged 69); Denmark
- Occupation: Actor
- Years active: 1912-1940

Holger Reenberg (3 September 1872 – 21 March 1942) was a Danish actor. He appeared in more than 20 films between 1912 and 1940.

== Selected filmography ==
- An Artist of Life (1925)
- Hotel Paradis (1931)
- Life on the Hegn Farm (1938)
