= Lenin, You Rascal, You =

1972 film

- DVD cover
- Directed by: Kirsten Stenbæk
- Written by: Bent Grasten; Kirsten Stenbæk
- Produced by: Just Betzer
- Starring: Peter Steen
- Cinematography: Carsten Behrendt-Poulsen
- Edited by: Anker Sørensen
- Release date: 15 February 1972
- Running time: 82 minutes
- Country: Denmark
- Language: Danish

Lenin, You Rascal, You (Danish: Lenin, din gavtyv!) is a 1972 Danish comedy film directed by Kirsten Stenbæk and starring Peter Steen and Dirch Passer. Jørgen Ryg won the Bodil Award for Best Actor in a Supporting Role for his role as adjutant Mühlhauser.

== Cast ==
- Peter Steen as Lenin
- as General Ludendorff
- Jørgen Ryg as Ludendorff's adjutant Mühlhauser
- Judy Gringer as Madame Holliday
- Eva Danné as Vanessa
- Ove Sprogøe as British Ambassador Mulligan
- Lisbet Lundquist as Liza / Princess Zenia
- Ulf Pilgaard as Train driver
- Pedro Biker as The Czar
- Otto Brandenburg as Bodyguard of the Czar / Dinerman in Berlin
- Bodil Udsen as A German Democrat
