= Henrik Wiehe =

Danish actor (1927–1987)

- Born: 9 February 1927; Frederiksberg, Denmark
- Died: 1 July 1987 (aged 60); Denmark
- Occupation: Actor
- Years active: 1950-1974

Henrik Wiehe (9 February 1927 – 1 July 1987) was a Danish film actor. He appeared in 30 films between 1950 and 1974. He was born in Frederiksberg, Denmark and died in Denmark.

== Selected filmography ==
- Som sendt fra himlen (1951)
- This Is Life (1953)
- We Who Go the Kitchen Route (1953)
- Blændværk (1955)
- Hvad vil De ha'? (1956)
- Færgekroen (1956)
- Father of Four on Bornholm (1959)
- Baronessen fra benzintanken (1960)
- Barbara (1961)
- Det støver stadig (1962)
- Martha (1967)
- Mig og min lillebror og storsmuglerne (1968)
- Me and My Kid Brother and Doggie (1969)
- Me, Too, in the Mafia (1974)
