= Marcel de Sade =

Danish imposter (1934–2025)

Marcel de Sade (30 March 1934 – 16 December 2025) was the assumed name of Jørgen Vase Larsen, a Danish criminal who passed himself off as a marquis during the 1960s.

== Biography ==
Sade was born in Aalborg, Denmark on 30 March 1934. He was sentenced to jail for embezzlement from the oil company he worked for. After his jailtime he worked as a caretaker. He was a piano player and known for his use of extravagant clothing.

Gabriel Axel's role in the 1967 Danish-Swedish comedy film The Reluctant Sadist is loosely based on his life.

De Sade died on 16 December 2025, at the age of 91.
