= Jesper Langberg =

Danish actor (1940–2019)

- Born: 20 October 1940; Frederiksberg, Denmark
- Died: 29 June 2019 (aged 78)
- Occupation: Actor
- Years active: 1965–2013

Jesper Langberg (20 October 1940 – 29 June 2019) was a Danish film actor. He appeared in more than 50 films.

== Biography ==
He was born in Frederiksberg, Denmark. He was the son of actor Sigurd Langberg and younger brother of actor Ebbe Langberg. He received the Bodil Award three times: in 1968 as Best Actor for his role in Sådan er de alle, in 1994 as Best Supporting Actor for Det forsømte forår and in 2014 for the Honorary Career Award.

== Selected filmography ==
- It's Nifty in the Navy (1965)
- The Girl and the Millionaire (1965)
- Neighbours (1966)
- Me and My Kid Brother (1967)
- Mig og min lillebror og storsmuglerne (1968)
- Me and My Kid Brother and Doggie (1969)
- Amour (1970)
- Oh, to Be on the Bandwagon! (1972)
- Olsen-banden Junior (2001)
