= Der kom en dag =

1955 film

- Original movie poster
- Directed by: Sven Methling
- Written by: Flemming Muus; John Olsen
- Produced by: John Olsen
- Starring: John Wittig; Astrid Villaume
- Cinematography: Aage Wiltrup
- Edited by: Anker Sørensen
- Music by: Sven Gyldmark
- Production company: Saga Studio
- Release date: 17 February 1955
- Running time: 104 minutes
- Country: Denmark
- Language: Danish

Der kom en dag (lit. 'A day dawned') is a 1955 Danish dramatic film directed by Sven Methling, It stars John Wittig, Kjeld Jacobsen and Astrid Villaume as Danish resistance fighters during the last days of the German occupation of Denmark in World War II.

== Cast ==
- John Wittig
- Astrid Villaume
- Kjeld Jacobsen
- Louis Miehe-Renard
- Kate Mundt
- Jakob Nielsen (actor)
- Poul Müller
- Svend Methling
- Gabriel Axel
- Inger Lassen
- Ole Wisborg
- Hans Egede Budtz
- Lilli Holmer
- Bent Christensen

== Production ==
The film was produced by John Olsen at Saga Studio. Co-written by Olsen and Flemming Muus, it is based on a true story as told in Muus' novel of the same name.

Locations used in the film include Amalienborg Palace, Hvidovre Church, Copenhagen Police Headquarters and Copenhagen City Hall.

== Reception ==
It won the 1955 Bodil Award for Best Danish Film (in a tie with Carl Th. Dreyer's Ordet).
