= The Only Way (1970 film) =

1970 American war drama film

- Directed by: Bent Christensen
- Screenplay by: John Gould
- Produced by: Barry Levinson
- Starring: Jane Seymour; Ebbe Rode; Helle Virkner; Ove Sprogoe
- Cinematography: Henning Kristiansen
- Edited by: Norman Wanstall
- Music by: Carl Davis
- Production companies: Hemisphere Pictures; Laterna Films
- Distributed by: Universal Marion Corporation
- Release date: October 20, 1970
- Running time: 86 minutes
- Country: United States
- Language: English

The Only Way is a 1970 war drama film about the Rescue of the Danish Jews starring Jane Seymour.

== Plot ==
In October, 1943, in German-occupied Denmark, the Nazis decide to deport all Danish Jews to extermination camps. However, the Danish people decide to prevent this. Lillian Stein, a Jewish ballet teacher, learns of the Nazi plan; but her father, a violin dealer, refuses to leave.

The Nazi round-up nets very few Jews, because most have gone into hiding, protected by the Danish resistance. Soldiers break into the Steins' apartment, but they are not there, having hidden upstairs in the apartment of their friend, Mr. Petersen.

The Resistance plans to spirit the Jews out of the country by hiring fishing boats to take them to neutral Sweden. Petersen meets with various people in an effort to get the Steins out of the country. Mr. Stein leaves the apartment to try to sell a valuable violin he owns, to raise necessary funds. When Dr. Kjær comes to pick up the family, Mrs. Stein refuses to leave without her husband but sends Lillian ahead. The Nazis return to Stein’s shop, but he again eludes capture.

The next day, as the couple are leaving Petersen’s apartment, Lars, Stein's assistant, gives his life to prevent their capture. After some narrow escapes, both Lillian and her parents reach the evacuation point. They board a small boat and soon reach Sweden.

== Cast ==
- Martin Potter as Morten Jensen
- Jane Seymour as Lillian Stein
- Ebbe Rode as Mr. Stein
- Helle Virkner as Mrs. Stein
- Ove Sprogøe as Mr. Petersen
- Bjørn Watt-Boolsen as Dr. Kjær
- Benny Hansen as Lars
