= Gunnar Lauring =

Danish actor (1905–1968)

- Born: 31 October 1905; Frederiksberg, Denmark
- Died: 21 February 1968 (aged 62); Frederiksberg, Denmark

Gunnar Lauring (31 October 1905 – 21 February 1968) was a Danish stage and film actor. He was the brother of the writer Palle Lauring (1909–1996).

== Filmography ==
- De bør forelske Dem – 1935
- Week-End – 1935
- Panserbasse – 1936
- Blaavand melder storm – 1938
- De tre, måske fire – 1939
- En ganske almindelig pige – 1940
- Barnet – 1940
- En pige med pep – 1940
- Tak fordi du kom, Nick – 1941
- Niels Pind og hans dreng – 1941
- Tag det som en mand – 1941
- En forbryder – 1941
- Et skud før midnat – 1942
- Tante Cramers testamente – 1942
- Baby på eventyr – 1942
- Ballade i Nyhavn – 1942
- Som du vil ha' mig – 1943
- Mine kære koner – 1943
- Otte akkorder – 1944
- Det kære København – 1944
- Mens sagføreren sover – 1945
- Far betaler – 1946
- Billet mrk. – 1946
- Brevet fra afdøde – 1946
- My name is Petersen – 1947
- Soldaten og Jenny – 1947
- Hatten er sat – 1947
- Mens porten var lukket – 1948
- Det hændte i København – 1949
- For frihed og ret – 1949
- Din fortid er glemt – 1950
- Min kone er uskyldig – 1950
- Fireogtyve timer – 1951
- Hold fingrene fra mor – 1951
- Nålen – 1951
- Vores fjerde far – 1951
- To minutter for sent – 1952
- Vi arme syndere – 1952
- Rekrut 67 Petersen – 1952
- We Who Go the Kitchen Route – 1953
- Min søn Peter – 1953
- Sønnen – 1953
- Adam og Eva – 1953
- Arvingen – 1954
- Et eventyr om tre – 1954
- På tro og love – 1955
- Kispus – 1956
- Vi som går stjernevejen – 1956
- Qivitoq – 1956
- Taxa K-1640 Efterlyses – 1956
- Lån mig din kone – 1957
- Tre piger fra Jylland – 1957
- Krudt og klunker – 1958
- Mor skal giftes – 1958
- Verdens rigeste pige – 1958
- Kærlighedens melodi – 1959
- Flemming og Kvik – 1960
- Tro, håb og trolddom – 1960
- Flemming på kostskole – 1961
- Hans Nielsen Hauge – 1961
- Harry og kammertjeneren – 1961
- Min kone fra Paris – 1961
- Eventyr på Mallorca – 1961
- Hans Nielsen Hauge – 1961
- Den rige enke – 1962
- Den kære familie – 1962
- Støvsugerbanden – 1963
- Dronningens vagtmester – 1963
- Sikke'n familie – 1963
- Døden kommer til middag – 1964
- Mord for åbent tæppe – 1964
- Halløj i himmelsengen – 1965
- Der var engang – 1966
- Søskende – 1966
- Nu stiger den – 1966
- Gys og gæve tanter – 1966
- Ih, du forbarmende – 1967
- Mig og min lillebror – 1967
- Historien om Barbara – 1967
