= Lis Løwert =

Danish actress (1919–2009)

- Born: 7 December 1919; Copenhagen, Denmark
- Died: 26 November 2009 (aged 89); Denmark
- Occupation: Actress
- Years active: 1938–1971

Lis Løwert (7 December 1919 – 26 November 2009) was a Danish film actress. She appeared in 23 films between 1938 and 1971. She was best known for her parts in two TV series: Mrs. Clausen in Huset på Christianshavn and Violet Vinter in Matador. Matador has been heralded as one of the best in Danish television. It originally aired between November 1978 and January 1982. The series finale which aired in 1985 still stands as the most viewed ever in Danish TV history, with approximately 3.6 million viewers in a country of only about 5 million people.

She was married to fellow actor Bjørn Watt-Boolsen. They wed on 20 July 1947 and remained married until his death on 28 December 1998.

== Filmography ==
- Den mandlige husassistent (1938)
- En forbryder (1941)
- Gå med mig hjem (1941)
- Tyrannens Fald (1942)
- Mordets melodi (1944)
- Oktoberroser (1946)
- Hans store aften (1946)
- Røverne fra Rold (1947)
- Penge som græs (1948)
- Kristinus Bergman (1948)
- Lejlighed til leje (1949)
- Susanne (1950)
- The Wooden Horse (1950)
- Familien Schmidt (1951)
- Adam og Eva (1953)
- På tro og love (1955)
- En kvinde er overflødig (1955)
- Kispus (1956)
- En kvinde er overflødig (1957)
- Poeten og Lillemor (1959)
- Poeten og Lillemor og Lotte (1960)
- Poeten og Lillemor i forårshumør (1961)
- Ballade på Christianshavn (1971)
