= Poeten og Lillemor og Lotte =

1960 film

- Directed by: Erik Balling
- Written by: Erik Balling; Jørgen Mogensen
- Produced by: John Hilbard; Carl Rald
- Starring: Henning Moritzen
- Cinematography: Jørgen Skov
- Edited by: Birger Lind
- Distributed by: Nordisk Film
- Release date: 2 May 1960
- Running time: 99 minutes
- Country: Denmark
- Language: Danish

Poeten og Lillemor og Lotte is a 1960 Danish comedy film directed by Erik Balling and starring Henning Moritzen and Helle Virkner.

== Cast ==
- Henning Moritzen as The poet
- Helle Virkner as Lillemor
- Ove Sprogøe as Anton
- Lis Løwert as Vera
- Dirch Passer as The baker
- Judy Gringer as Bagerjomfru Lise
- Bodil Udsen as The midwife
- Karl Stegger as Slagteren
- Arne Weel as Redaktøren
- Bjørn WattasBoolsen as Fotografen
- Preben Kaas as Journalisten
- Holger Hansen as Ministeren
- Ove Rud as Vred ung mand

== Reception ==
Tobias Lynge Herler, writing for Philm.dk, praises Stegger performance: "Karl Stegger's butcher portrait, however, is the film's best-balanced performance."
