= Emil Hass Christensen =

Danish actor (1903–1982)

- Born: 23 January 1903; Frederiksberg, Denmark
- Died: 12 January 1982 (aged 78); Denmark
- Occupation: Actor
- Years active: 1925–1978

Emil Hass Christensen (23 January 1903 – 12 January 1982) was a Danish film actor. He appeared in 60 films between 1925 and 1978. He was born in Frederiksberg, Denmark and died in Denmark.

== Selected filmography ==
- Cirkusrevyen 1936 – 1936
- Ebberød Bank – 1943
- Bag de røde porte – 1951
- Familien Schmidt – 1951
- Det sande ansigt – 1951
- Vejrhanen – 1952
- Avismanden – 1952
- Adam og Eva – 1953
- The Crime of Tove Andersen – 1953
- En sømand går i land – 1954
- Ordet – 1955
- Tre finder en kro – 1955
- Den kloge mand – 1956
- Taxa K-1640 Efterlyses – 1956
- Ung leg – 1956
- Englen i sort – 1957
- Sønnen fra Amerika – 1957
- Tre piger fra Jylland – 1957
- Andre folks børn – 1958
- Det lille hotel – 1958
- Soldaterkammerater – 1958
- Styrmand Karlsen – 1958
- Wir Wunderkinder (tysk) – 1958
- Vi er allesammen tossede – 1959
- Onkel Bill fra New York – 1959
- Baronessen fra benzintanken – 1960
- Frihedens pris – 1960
- Komtessen – 1961
- Peters baby – 1961
- Støv på hjernen – 1961
- Drømmen om det hvide slot – 1962
- Peters landlov – 1963
- Fem mand og Rosa – 1964
- Sytten – 1965
- Hold da helt ferie – 1965
- Min søsters børn – 1966
- Smukke Arne og Rosa – 1967
- Hurra for de blå husarer – 1970
- Nøglen til Paradis – 1970
- Manden på Svanegården – 1972
- På'en igen Amalie – 1973
- Bejleren – en jysk røverhistorie – 1975
- Kassen stemmer – 1976
- Olsen-banden går i krig – 1978
