= Flemming og Kvik =

1960 film

- Poster
- Directed by: Gabriel Axel
- Written by: Børge Müller, Gabriel Axel, Børge Slot
- Produced by: Lilly Slot, Børge Slot
- Cinematography: Jørgen Skov
- Edited by: Lars Brydesen
- Music by: Morten Reesen
- Distributed by: Panorama Film
- Release date: 17 October 1960
- Running time: 107
- Country: Denmark
- Language: Danish

Flemming og Kvik is a 1960 Danish coming-of-age film directed by Gabriel Axel.

== Cast ==
- Johannes Meyer
- Jørgen Reenberg
- Bjarne Forchhammer
- Berthe Qvistgaard
- Ghita Nørby
- Louis Miehe-Renard
- Gunnar Lauring
- Astrid Villaume
- Lykke Nielsen
