= Som sendt fra himlen =

1951 film

- Directed by: Johan Jacobsen
- Written by: Børge Müller
- Produced by: Johan Jacobsen
- Starring: Mogens Wieth
- Cinematography: Werner Hedman; Tom Jensen
- Release date: 16 November 1951
- Running time: 95 minutes
- Country: Denmark
- Language: Danish

Som sendt fra himlen (English: As sent from Heaven) is a 1951 Danish comedy film directed by Johan Jacobsen.

The plot revolves around the young and beautiful Laura Heiberg, who is going to be married to Torsten Vinge. When the priest asks Laura if she will marry him, she says no and escapes from the church.

== Cast ==
- Mogens Wieth as Allan / Alfred Kragh
- Birgitte Reimer as Laura Heiberg
- Kjeld Petersen as Torsten Vinge
- Erik Mørk as Herbert Thorsen
- Johannes Meyer as Kommandanten
- Nina Kalckar as Fru Nina Heiberg
- Svend Bille as Villy Edward Heiberg
- Minna Jørgensen as Fru Nissen, husholderske
- Osvald Helmuth as Jonas Møller
- Henrik Wiehe as Præst
- Dirch Passer as Soldat
- John Wittig as Præst
- Miskow Makwarth as Taxachauffør
- Jørgen Weel as Spejderfører
