= The Poet and the Little Mother =

1959 film

- Directed by: Erik Balling
- Written by: Erik Balling; Jørgen Mogensen; Henning Nystad
- Produced by: John Hilbard; Carl Rald
- Starring: Henning Moritzen; Helle Virkner; Ove Sprogøe
- Cinematography: Poul Pedersen; Jørgen Skov
- Edited by: Carsten Dahl
- Distributed by: Nordisk Film
- Release date: 6 March 1959
- Running time: 95 minutes
- Country: Denmark
- Language: Danish

The Poet and the Little Mother (Danish: Poeten og Lillemor) is a 1959 Danish family film directed by Erik Balling and starring Henning Moritzen. The film was entered in the 9th Berlin International Film Festival.

== Cast ==
- Henning Moritzen as Poeten
- Helle Virkner as Lillemor
- Ove Sprogøe as Anton
- Lis Løwert as Vera
- Olaf Ussing as Kreditoren
- Dirch Passer as Bageren
- Karl Stegger as Slagteren
- Valsø Holm as Købmanden
- Helga Frier as Købmandens kone
- Kjeld Petersen as Henry Hamber
- Judy Gringer as Lise
- Paul Hagen as Postbudet
- Axel Strøbye as Landmåleren
- Ole Mogens as Sangeren
- Henry Lohmann
- Bjørn Spiro
- Jytte Abildstrøm
