= Kispus =

- Theatrical release poster
- Directed by: Erik Balling
- Written by: Erik Balling
- Starring: Helle Virkner; Henning Moritzen
- Cinematography: Poul Pedersen
- Edited by: Carsten Dahl
- Music by: Ulrik Neumann; Svend Asmussen; Arvid Muller, lyrics
- Distributed by: Nordisk Film Kompagni
- Release date: 1956
- Running time: 105 minutes
- Country: Denmark
- Language: Danish

Kispus is a 1956 Danish romantic comedy film written and directed by Erik Balling. The film was the first Danish feature movie to be filmed in colour.

== Synopsis ==
The eccentric fashion designer Mr. Marcel gives his newly designed gown to the common working-class seamstress, Eva, when he sees how well it fits her. He then bets with Elizabeth, the actress who originally ordered the gown, that if Eva wears his creation to an upcoming movie premiere, she will be accepted as a high-society woman. He turns out to be correct and Eva attracts the young aristocrat Jakob. Eva fears that Jakob will discover her lowly background, but Jakob himself is a fraud. He is only a poor student who works as a chauffeur and sells his books to take her out. After numerous misunderstandings and complications, love wins out over snobbery and fraud.

== Cast ==
- Helle Virkner as Eva Møller, seamstress
- Henning Moritzen as Jakob, student
- Angelo Bruun as Hr. Marcel, fashion designer
- Nina Pens Rode as Elizabeth, primadonna
- Gunnar Lauring as Carl, Elizabeth's husband
- Ove Sprogøe as Max, waiter, Eva's brother
- Lis Løwert as Joan, Max's wife
- Inger Lassen as Jokum, Mr. Marcel's agent
- Gerda Madsen as Mrs. Knudsen, Jakob's landlady
- Poul Reichhardt as An actor
- Margaretha Fahlén as Actor's wife
- Birgitte Federspiel as Dora, Society Lady
- Vera Gebuhr as Ida, actress
- Jessie Rindom as Society Lady
- Bjørn Watt-Boolsen as Svend, writer
- Lily Broberg as Svend's ex-wife
