= Peter Reichhardt =

Danish actor and theatre director

Peter Reichhardt (born 7 January 1967) is a Danish actor and theatre director. He is the son of actors Poul Reichhardt and Charlotte Ernst. He was the director of the Mungo Park in Lillerød from 1998–2005.

== Selected filmography ==
Film
Year	Title	Role
2005	Adam's Apples	Nalle
1997	Barbara	Andreas Heyde
1983	Zappa	Sten
1969	Me and My Kid Brother and Doggie	Little Peter
1968	Mig og min lillebror og storsmuglerne	Little Peter
