= Erik Mørk =

Danish actor (1925–1993)

- Born: 3 December 1925; Copenhagen, Denmark
- Died: 27 January 1993 (aged 67); Copenhagen, Denmark
- Occupation: Actor
- Years active: 1950–1993

Erik Mørk (3 December 1925 – 27 January 1993) was a Danish film actor. He appeared in 29 films between 1950 and 1993. He won the Bodil Award for Best Actor in 1950 for his performance in Susanne.

== Selected filmography ==
- Susanne (1950): Bodil Award for Best Actor
- Som sendt fra himlen (1951)
- Relax Freddie (1966)
- The Witch Hunt (1981)
- Europa (1991)
- The Russian Singer (1993)
