= Aage Winther-Jørgensen =

Danish actor (1900–1967)

- Born: 16 May 1900; Copenhagen, Denmark
- Died: 10 April 1967 (aged 66); Frederiksberg, Denmark
- Occupation: Actor
- Years active: 1931–1964

Aage Winther-Jørgensen (16 May 1900 – 10 April 1967) was a Danish actor.

== Partial filmography ==
- The Vicar of Vejlby (1931) - Musicerende præst
- Skaf en sensation (1934) - Kahn
- The Golden Smile (1935)
- Elverhøj (1939) - Mogens - Jæger
- Sørensen og Rasmussen (1940) - Lauritz
- En søndag på Amager (1941) - Lods Mikkelsen
- Afsporet (1942) - Overbetjent
- Jeg mødte en morder (1943) - Politimester
- Drama på slottet (1943) - Vilhelm
- To som elsker hinanden (1944) - Forvalteren
- Affæren Birte (1945) - Professor Olesen
- Fyrtøjet (1946) - (voice)
- For frihed og ret (1949) - Utilfreds dansker
- Min kone er uskyldig (1950) - Kriminalbetjent
- Nålen (1951) - Forbryder
- The Crime of Tove Andersen (1953) - Kriminalassistent
- Sønnen (1953) - Sofus
- Kongeligt besøg (1954) - Soldat
- Ild og Jord (1955) - Gårdskarl Arne
- Gengæld (1955) - Sørensen - vognmand
- Tante Tut fra Paris (1956) - Betjent
- Der var engang en gade (1957) - Carlo
- Mig og min familie (1957) - Jens Peter
- Mariannes bryllup (1958) - Rasmussen
- Spion 503 (1958) - Majorens oppasser
- Onkel Bill fra New York (1959) - Valdemar
- Skibet er ladet med... (1960) - Støjhus direktør
- Harry and the Butler (1961) - Orla
- Duellen (1962) - Bloddonor
- Bussen (1963) - Smeden
- Don Olsen kommer til byen (1964) - En mand (final film role)
