= Lotte Horne =

Danish actress (born 1943)

- Born: 3 June 1943 (age 82); Horsens, Denmark
- Occupation: Actress
- Years active: 1966-1973

Lotte Horne (born 3 June 1943) is a Danish film actress. She appeared in 15 films between 1966 and 1973.

== Filmography ==
- Seks roller søger en forfatter (1973)
- Indbildt hanrej (1971)
- Nattens frelse (1971)
- Threesome (1970)
- Sangen om den røde rubin (1970)
- Mig og min lillebror og Bølle (1969)
- Sjov i gaden (1969)
- Midt i en jazztid (1969)
- Mig og min lillebror og storsmuglerne (1968)
- Jeg elsker blåt (1968)
- Mig og min lillebror (1967)
- Människor möts och ljuv musik uppstår i hjärtat (1967)
- Smukke-Arne og Rosa (1967)
- Jeg - en marki (1967)
- Der var engang (1966)
