= Cynthia Olson Reichhardt =

American physicist

Cynthia J. Olson Reichhardt (also published as C. J. Olson) is an American condensed matter physicist whose research involves the use of computer simulations to study disordered media and non-equilibrium systems, with applications to the understanding of how aging affects stockpiled nuclear weapons. She is a member of the technical staff at the Los Alamos National Laboratory, where she is affiliated with the Physics and Chemistry of Materials Group, and with the Center for Nonlinear Studies.

== Education ==
Reichhardt majored in physics at Luther College, graduating summa cum laude in 1994 with minors in Spanish and mathematics. She went to the University of Michigan for graduate study in physics, earned a master's degree there in 1995, and completed her Ph.D. in 1998.

She became chair of the American Physical Society's Topical Group on Statistical and Nonlinear Physics in 2022.

== Recognition ==
Reichhardt was named a Fellow of the American Physical Society (APS) in 2011, after a nomination from the APS Division of Condensed Matter Physics, "for characterization of collective phenomena in driven systems with long-range interactions, including non-equilibrium phase diagrams, avalanches, noise and fractal flow". In 2018, she was named a Fellow of the Los Alamos National Laboratory.
