= The Child (1940 film) =

1940 film

- Directed by: Benjamin Christensen
- Written by: Leck Fischer; Benjamin Christensen
- Starring: Agis Winding
- Cinematography: Valdemar Christensen
- Release date: 21 August 1940
- Running time: 85 minutes
- Country: Denmark
- Language: Danish

The Child (Danish: Barnet) is a 1940 Danish drama film directed by Benjamin Christensen.

== Cast ==
- Agis Winding as the mother
- Bjarne Forchhammer as Albert
- Charles Tharnæs as Elias
- Beatrice Bonnesen as Cora
- Mogens Wieth as Pontus
- Inger Lassen as Anna
- Gunnar Lauring as Henrik
- Lis Smed as Ilse
