= Bjørn Watt-Boolsen =

Danish actor (1923–1998)

- Born: 20 June 1923; Rudkøbing, Denmark
- Died: 28 December 1998 (aged 75); Denmark
- Occupation: Actor
- Years active: 1943–1998

Bjørn Watt-Boolsen (20 June 1923 – 28 December 1998) was a Danish film actor. He appeared in 50 films between 1943 and 1998. He was born in Rudkøbing, Denmark and died in Denmark. He was married to actress Lis Løwert. They married on 20 July 1947 and remained married until his death.

== Selected filmography ==
- The Red Meadows (1945)
- I Love Another (1946)
- The Viking Watch of the Danish Seaman (1948)
- Kampen mod uretten (1949)
- Adam and Eve (1953)
- We Who Go the Kitchen Route (1953)
- Kispus (1956)
- Qivitoq (1956)
- Poeten og Lillemor og Lotte (1960)
- The Greeneyed Elephant (1960)
- Den kære familie (1962)
- The Girl and the Press Photographer (1963)
- The Olsen Gang Sees Red (1976)
