= Arne Weel =

Danish actor and film director

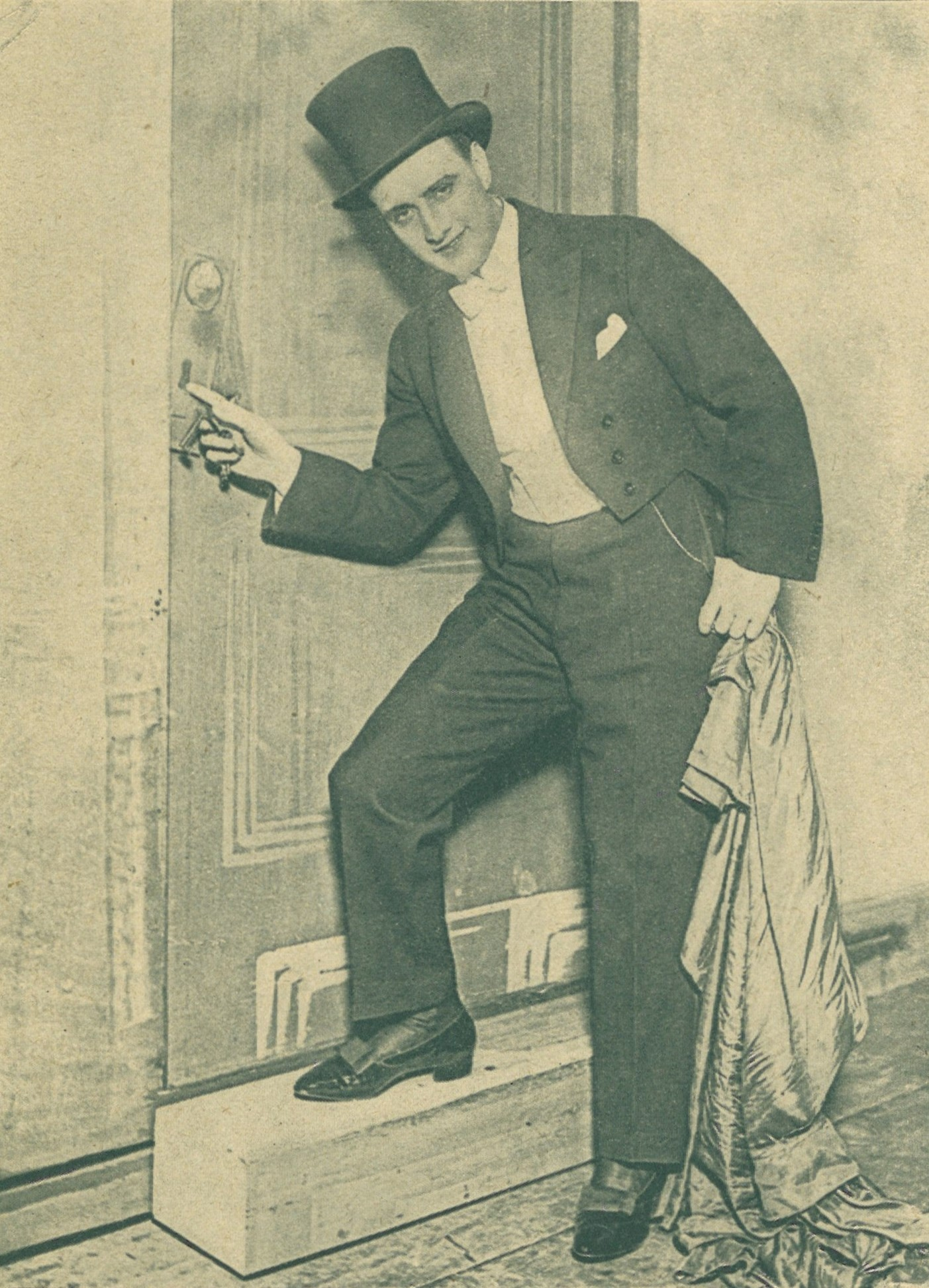
- Born: 15 January 1891; Århus, Denmark
- Died: 2 October 1975 (aged 84); Denmark
- Occupations: Actor; Film director
- Years active: 1910–1967

Arne Weel (15 January 1891 – 2 October 1975) was a Danish actor and film director. He appeared in more than 50 films between 1910 and 1967. He also directed films between 1935 and 1950. He was born in Århus, Denmark and died in Denmark.

== Selected filmography ==
- Lace (1926)
- Sister Veronika (1927)
- Bag Københavns kulisser (1935)
- Life on the Hegn Farm (1938)
- The People of Högbogården (1939)
- Poeten og Lillemor og Lotte (1960)
