= Svend Methling =

Danish actor and director (1891–1977)

- Born: 1 October 1891; Denmark
- Died: 4 June 1977 (aged 85)
- Years active: 1924–1962

Svend Methling (1 October 1891 – 4 June 1977) was a Danish actor and film director.

He was a director for Dansk Skolescene 1924–1929, for Folkescenen 1925 and for Komediehuset 1929–1930. He also worked as a director at the Det Ny Teater between 1926 and 1929. From 1932 to 1962 he worked as an actor in numerous films – often family musical oriented films. During this time he also directed several films, but the bulk of his work on film was in the 1940s. In 1946 he directed The Tinderbox, the first Danish animated feature film, animated by Børge Ring.

== Selected filmography as an actor ==
- Der var engang - 1922
- Hadda Padda - 1924
- Kirke og orgel - 1932
- Champagnegaloppen - 1938
- Det store ansvar - 1944
- Familien Gelinde - 1944
- Den usynlige hær - 1945
- Soldaten og Jenny - 1947
- Tre år efter - 1948
- For frihed og ret - 1949
- Berlingske Tidende (film) - 1949
- Historien om Hjortholm - 1950
- Unge piger forsvinder i København - 1951
- Fra den gamle købmandsgård - 1951
- Husmandstøsen - 1952
- Kærlighedsdoktoren - 1952
- The Crime of Tove Andersen (1953)
- We Who Go the Kitchen Route (1953)
- Karen, Maren og Mette - 1954
- Bruden fra Dragstrup - 1955
- Der kom en dag - 1955
- En kvinde er overflødig - 1957
- Tre piger fra Jylland - 1957
- Ingen tid til kærtegn - 1957
- Sømænd og svigermødre - 1962
