= Susanne (1950 film) =

- Movie poster for Susanne
- Directed by: Torben Anton Svendsen
- Written by: Fleming Lynge
- Based on: Susanne (1931 novel) by Johannes Buchholtz
- Starring: Rasmus Christiansen, Ellen Gottschalch, Erik Mørk, Astrid Villaume
- Production company: Nordisk Film
- Release date: 24 March 1950 (Denmark)
- Running time: 99 minutes
- Country: Denmark
- Language: Danish

Susanne is a Danish film of 1950, directed by Torben Anton Svendsen and starring Astrid Villaume in the title role.

The film won three prizes at the 1950 Bodil Awards: Best Actor (Erik Mørk), Best Actress (Astrid Villaume) and Best (Danish) Film.

== Cast ==
- Erik Mørk ... Hakon Riis
- Astrid Villaume ... Susanne Drewes
- Ellen Gottschalch ... Andrea Drewes
- Lis Løwert ... Helene Drewes
- Katy Valentin ... Louise Hallenberg
