= Aage Stentoft =

Danish composer (1914–1990)

- Aage Stentoft (left) with comic actor Dirch Passer
- Born: 1 May 1914; Holbæk, Denmark
- Died: 8 July 1990 (aged 76)
- Years active: 1934–1981

Aage Stentoft (1 May 1914 – 8 July 1990) was a Danish composer, film score composer and theatre director. He composed over 700 melodies during his lifetime.

== Biography ==
Stentoft was born in Holbæk, where he graduated from the Stenhus Kostskole (now Stenhus Gymnasium og HF). Initially, he planned to study law, but due to lack of money, he started to compose music for commercials. In 1934, he began working as an accompanist and composer for the revue troupe Co-Optimisterne. A lot of his tunes quickly achieved widespread popularity, and he earned good money by composing and, later on, by producing revues.

During his career, Stentoft also managed various theatres: Frederiksberg Teater (now Aveny-T) in Frederiksberg and three theatres in Copenhagen, Dagmar Teatret, Det Ny Scala and Apolloteatret. In 1961, he emigrated to Spain. In 1973, he returned to Denmark as leader of the Tivoli Gardens theatre, a job he kept until his retirement in 1981, when he returned to Spain. He died at his home near Málaga in 1990.

== Popular tunes ==
- Luften var femten og vandet var seksten (1935)
- Dit hjerte er i fare, Andresen (1936)
- I den mellemste køje (1936)
- Henne om hjørnet (1936)
- Havnen (1937)
- Molak molak mak mak mak (1937)
- Konen, kællingen, madammen (1938)
- Månestrålen (1939)
- Alt var kun en drøm (1939)
- Den lille lysegrønne (1940)
- Jeg har aldrig kysset andre end Marie (1942)
- Såd'n var det ikke i halvfemserne (1944)
- Jacobsen (1948)
- Kys hinanden (1954)
- Pyt (1977)

== Sources ==
- Kraks Blå Bog online (in Danish)
- Aage Stentoft at IMDb
