= Astrid Henning-Jensen =

Danish film director, actress, and editor

- Born: Astrid Smahl; 10 December 1914; Frederiksberg, Denmark
- Died: 5 January 2002 (aged 87); Copenhagen, Denmark
- Occupations: Film director Screenwriter
- Years active: 1941–1996

Astrid Henning-Jensen (born Astrid Smahl; 10 December 1914 – 5 January 2002) was a Danish film director, actress, editor and screenwriter.

== Early life ==
Henning-Jensen was born in the Copenhagen district of Frederiksberg in 1914, to parents Ferdinand Smahl and Ruth Hanner. She graduated from secondary school (realskole) and began working as an actress in the theatre. She acted from 1935 to 1938 in theatres such as Alléscenen and Riddersalen in Copenhagen. On 10 August 1938, she married Danish film director Bjarne Henning-Jensen.

== Career ==
Her marriage to Bjarne Henning-Jensen was of great importance to her career. She began working as his assistant in 1941 at Nordisk Film. The duo worked together on a number of films as co-directors, co-writers as well as assisting one another on individual projects.

Henning-Jensen worked as a filmmaker in multiple capacities; writing, editing and directing. In her career spanning more than 50 years she made a large number of short films, films for Danish television, documentaries as well as feature films.

In 1981, Henning-Jensen was a member of the jury at the 31st Berlin International Film Festival and, in 1996, she was awarded with the Berlinale Camera award at the 46th Berlin International Film Festival

=== Notable works and themes ===
==== Ditte, Child of Man (1946) ====
Ditte, Child of Man is a feature film adaptation of Martin Andersen Nexø's novel Ditte Menneskebarn (1921). Henning-Jensen worked on the film as assistant director along with her husband. The film marks the international breakthrough of the Henning-Jensen duo. Furthermore, it has been called the film that gave hope to the future of Danish cinema following the second world war, and is in this effect compared to Italian Neorealism.

The film was part of the 2004 Danish Culture Canon (Kulturkanonen), an initiative from then Minister of Culture Brian Mikkelsen, which displays a selection of 108 "cultural works of excellence". The film is also an example of a theme that has been addressed numerous times throughout Henning-Jensen's career: that of childhood. In an article written to present the duo with "the most esteemed Danish children's film prize" (Unibank og Danske Børnefilmklubbers filmpris 1990) they are praised as pioneers of Danish children's cinema. The article views Ditte, Child of Man (1946) as the start of a flourishing tradition, and Those Damned Kids (1947) as the first real Danish children's film. These films—as well as Paw (1959), Early Spring (1986), and a number of Henning-Jensen's other films—deal with the emotional lives of children in a realist fashion. Two major styles are used in the way of portraying children in Henning-Jensen's films: one being that of a humanitarian dichotomy between the welfare of the few and the social impotence of the many, the other of children's drive to play versus lack of opportunities for expression. Another major style is the portrayal of children's imagination free of adult restriction. At the same time, many of these films deal with the importance of security from parents and adults; there needs to be restrictions to dream them away. Ditte, Child of Man is noted as the film where children were given their own voice in Danish cinema for the first time.

==== Paw, Boy of Two Worlds (1959) ====
Paw, Boy of Two Worlds is the story of a young boy who is brought to Denmark from the West Indies after his Danish father dies. The film deals with Paw's introduction to a new way living, and was noted for being one of the first in Denmark to openly discuss racism in society. The film was nominated for Best Foreign Language Film at the 32nd Academy Awards in 1959, as well as being awarded the Grand Prix Technique at the 1960 Cannes Film Festival. In addition, it was awarded the Council of Europe Film Award at the Venice Film Festival and received a diploma of honor at the Edinburgh Film Festival.

==== Humanitarianism and realism ====
Paw, and especially its portrayal of racism, is an example of one of the most important aspects of Henning-Jensen's career: her themes of humanitarianism, as well as social issues and justice, in which she gave center place to children and women. This is also the case in her 1978 adaptation of Dea Trier Mørch's bestseller, Vinterbørn. The film follows a series of women experiencing difficulties with their pregnancies and explores the bond that forms between them at a hospital.

Another important part of Henning-Jensen's films is realism. In her career, she made a substantial amount of documentaries dealing with the lives of people in different environments, such as ballet children in Ballettens børn (1954), or the recovery of torture victims in Trods alt (1990). But realism also plays a part in her fictional works. While Still Young (1943)—the feature film debut of husband Bjarne Henning-Jensen on which Henning-Jensen was co-writer and assistant—deals with the life of young artists in the Copenhagen art scene, and was regarded as neo-realist. Henning-Jensen's films are also noted as retaining documentarist influences from her early films, by shooting on-location, having a natural acting style, and dealing with realistic problems.

== Autobiography ==
In 1999, Henning-Jensen published an autobiography—written with Danish author Barbara Gress—in which she tells stories about her life and career. In a very open and intimate manner, she talks about her experiences making movies, meetings with others, and her personal life. The book was compiled and edited by Barbara Gress.

== Filmography ==
Selection of Astrid Henning-Jensen filmography.

Year	Title	Contribution	Notes
1937	Cocktail	Actress	
1940	Pinocchio	Co-director	Henning-Jensen and her husband directed the 1940 Danish version of the Disney film.
1941	Cykeldrengene i Tørvegraven	Director	Documentary
1942	Mødrehjælpen	Assistant Photographer	Documentary
1943	The Foal (Føllet)	Co-Editor	Short Documentary
1943	While Still Young (Naar Man Kun Er Ung)	Co-Writer	
1944	Danish Police in Sweden (Dansk Politi i Sverige)	Director	Documentary
1946	Ditte, Child of Man (Ditte Menneskebarn)	Assistant Director	Film adaptation of 1921 Martin Andersen Nexø novel Ditte, Child of Man.
1947	Those Damned Kids (De Pokkers Unger)	Director	
1947	Denmark Grows Up	Co-director, Writer	
1948	Kristinus Bergman	Director	Film adaptation of 1938 Arthur Omre novel.
1949	Palle All Alone (Palle Alene i Verden)	Director, Writer	Short feature adaptation of 1942 children's book by Jens Sigsgaard and Arne Ungermann. Henning-Jensen's son Lars played the lead character Palle. Received special prize Priz pour le sujet for its story at the 1949 Cannes Film Festival.
1950	North Sea Boys (Versterhavsdrenge)	Director	Film adaptation of A. Chr. Westergaard novel Klit Per.
1951	Kranens Konditori	Director, Writer	Film adaptation of 1946 Cora Sandel novel Kranens konditori.
1959	Paw, Boy of Two Worlds (Paw)	Director, Co-Writer	Nominated for the Best Foreign Language Film at the 32nd Academy Awards in 1959. Part of the Official Selection at the 1960 Cannes Film Festival where it won Grand Prix Technique for its photography.
1961	Een blandt mange	Director, Writer, Producer	
1962	Pan (Kort Är Sommeren)	Writer	Film adaptation of Knut Hamsun novel Pan.
1966	Unfaithful (Utro)	Director, Co-Writer, Co-Producer	Film adaptation of 1960 Tove Ditlevsen novel To som elsker hinanden.
1969	Me and You (Mig og Dig)	Director, Writer	
1978	Winterborn (Vinterbørn)	Director, Writer, Co-Editor	Film adaptation of 1976 Dea Trier Mørch novel Vinterbørn. Won the Silver Bear for Best Director at the 1979 Berlin International Film Festival.
1980	The Moment (Øjeblikket)	Director, Writer	
1984	The Element of Crime (Forbrydelsens element)	Actress	Directed by Lars von Trier.
1985	Hodja from Pjort (Hodja fra Pjort)	Actress	
1986	Early Spring (Barndommens Gade)	Director	Film adaptation of 1943 Tove Ditlevsen novel Barndommens Gade. Was entered into the 15th Moscow International Film Festival.
1996	Bella, min Bella	Director, Writer	Henning-Jensen's last feature film.

== Awards and nominations ==
Year	Award	Category	Film	Result
1949	Cannes Film Festival	Special Prize: Prix pour le sujet	Palle All Alone	Won
1959	Academy Awards	Best Foreign Language Film	Paw, Boy of Two Worlds	Nominated
1960	Cannes Film Festival	Grand Prix Technique	Paw, Boy of Two Worlds	Won
1979	Berlin International Film Festival	Silver Bear for Best Director	Winterborn	Won

In addition to receiving numerous special prizes and nominations for her films, Henning-Jensen was named Årets Æreskunstner (Honorary Artist of the Year) at the 1995 Copenhagen Film Festival.
