= Pelle the Conqueror =

1987 film directed by Bille August

- Original Swedish poster
- Danish: Pelle Erobreren
- Swedish: Pelle Erövraren
- Directed by: Bille August
- Screenplay by: Bille August; Per Olov Enquist; Bjarne Reuter; Max Lundgren
- Based on: Pelle Erobreren by Martin Andersen Nexø
- Produced by: Per Holst
- Starring: Max von Sydow; Pelle Hvenegaard; Erik Paaske; Bjørn Granath
- Cinematography: Jörgen Persson
- Edited by: Janus Billeskov Jansen
- Music by: Stefan Nilsson
- Production companies: Odyssey Entertainment; Svensk Filmindustri; Per Holst Filmproduktion
- Distributed by: Svensk Filmindustri (Sweden); Kærne Film (Denmark)
- Release date: 25 December 1987
- Running time: 157 minutes
- Countries: Denmark; Sweden
- Languages: Scanian; Danish; Swedish
- Budget: $4.5 million
- Box office: $2 million (US/Canada)

Pelle the Conqueror (Danish: Pelle Erobreren, Swedish: Pelle Erövraren) is a 1987 epic film co-written and directed by Bille August, based upon the 1906 novel of the same name by Danish writer Martin Andersen Nexø. The film tells the story of two Swedish immigrants to Denmark, a father and son, who try to build a new life for themselves. It stars Pelle Hvenegaard as the young Pelle, with Max von Sydow as his father, and also features Axel Strøbye and Astrid Villaume.

A co-production of Denmark and Sweden, August chose to adapt Boyhood, the first part of Nexø's novel, seeking to make an epic and citing the novel's status as essential reading in Denmark. Pelle Hvenegaard was 11 when he was cast, after some 3,000 children auditioned. Like many other boys in Denmark, he was named by his family for the novel's eponymous character.

The film screened at the 1988 Cannes Film Festival and the New York Film Festival. It was critically acclaimed, winning the Palme d'Or and the 1988 Academy Award for Best Foreign Language Film, and numerous other honours.

== Plot ==
In the late 1850s, the elderly emigrant Lasse Karlsson and his son Pelle reached the Danish island of Bornholm after leaving Skåne County, in southern Sweden, following the death of the boy's mother. Lasse finds it difficult to secure work, given his advanced age and Pelle's youth. They are forced to toil at a large farm, where they are generally mistreated by the managers.

The managers work under the tyrannical Kongstrup, who has a history of affairs with female employees, resulting in illegitimate children. Among such children is Rud, who befriends Pelle and helps him learn Danish. Eventually, Pelle becomes more confident and begins attending school, though he is still discriminated against as a foreigner. Pelle also befriends the Swedish worker Erik, who is constantly harassed for alleged sloth. Erik shares his dream of visiting America, China, and "Negroland" with Pelle, aiming to "conquer" the world. Rud runs away after poor performance at school, but Pelle begins to excel.

After Kongstrup impregnates Mrs. Kongstrup's visiting niece Miss Sine, his wife castrates him for his abuses. Lasse begins an affair with Mrs. Olsen, believed to be a widow since her husband has not returned from a long sea voyage. Pelle is teased at school for his father's affair.

At the farm, Erik is injured and disabled after attempting to lead a revolt against management. Mrs. Olsen's husband returns from his voyage, and Lasse is overcome with depression and alcoholism. The two appeal to the Kongstrups for aid against their harassment. Mrs. Kongstrup offers support, but her husband remains silent. Pelle receives a promotion but, after witnessing Erik forced from the farm, vows to leave. Lasse initially resolves to go with him, before deciding he is too old to travel. He sends Pelle alone into the world.

== Cast ==
- Max von Sydow as Lassefar "Lasse" Karlsson
- Pelle Hvenegaard as Pelle Karlsson
- Erik Paaske as Foreman
- Björn Granath as Erik
- Astrid Villaume as Mrs. Kongstrup
- Axel Strøbye as Kongstrup
- Troels Asmussen as Rud
- Kristina Törnqvist as Anna
- Karen Wegener as Mrs. Olsen
- Sofie Gråbøl as Miss Sine
- Lars Simonsen as Niels Køller
- Buster Larsen as Ole Køller
- John Wittig as Schoolteacher
- Thure Lindhardt as Nilen

== Production ==
=== Development ===
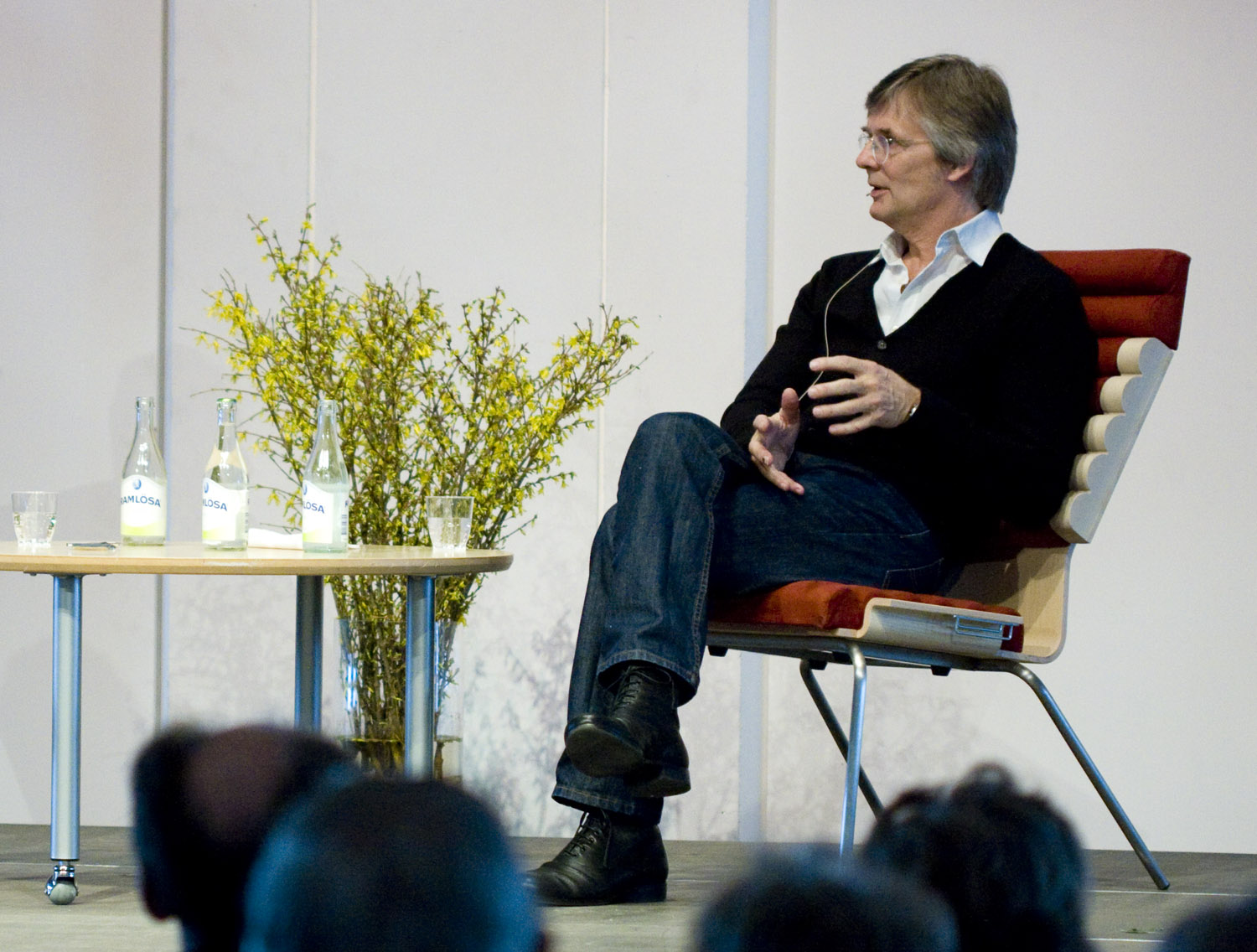
Bille August co-adapted and directed Pelle the Conqueror out of an ambition to make an epic film.

The film, based on the 1906 novel of the same name by Martin Andersen Nexø, was a co-production by Danish and Swedish companies. As the story had both Danish and Swedish elements, cooperation between producers in both countries had practical benefit.

The screenplay, by director Bille August, Per Olov Enquist, Max Lundgren, and Bjarne Reuter, adapted only the first Boyhood part of Nexø's four-volume work. August decided to film the novel, considered essential reading in Denmark, and he wanted to make an epic film. August wrote a screenplay based on the second part Apprenticeship but had no immediate plans to film it.

For the title role, Pelle Hvenegaard, who was 11, was cast after August and the crew auditioned 3,000 children. August decided on Hvenegaard, who he said demonstrated concentration, patience and self-control. The boy was coincidentally named after the character in Nexø's book, as are many boys in Denmark, given the decades-long popularity of the book.

=== Filming ===
The film marked the first collaboration between production designer Anna Asp, who had previously worked on Offret (1986), and August, who had attended a Stockholm school of photography with her. Asp said that in designing the house seen in Pelle the Conqueror, she wanted to evoke a prison, and thus built the walls and painted them black and white.

Filming took place for nearly six months over a one year period, with a long break to wait for winter. Its budget of $4.5 million, secured from the Danish and Swedish film institutes, made it one of the most costly films made in the Scandinavian countries.

== Release ==
The film was screened in the Cannes Film Festival in May 1988 where it won the Palme d'Or and was acquired by Odyssey Entertainment. It was later screened at the New York Film Festival in September 1988. The film's awards attracted the attention of foreign distributors, with Miramax releasing it in the United States in December 1988.

Buoyed by the Academy Award recognition, Pelle the Conqueror grossed $2,053,931 in the United States and Canada, a "respectable" figure for a foreign film. The film had a re-release at Golden West College in Los Angeles in March 1993.

== Reception ==
=== Critical reception ===
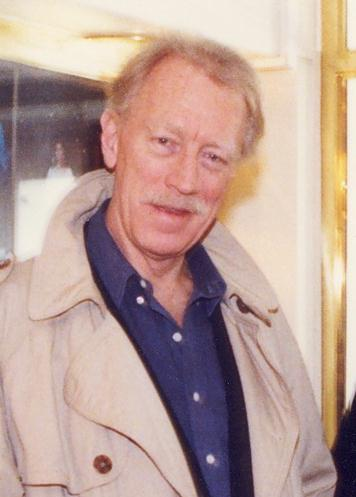
Max von Sydow's performance received positive reviews, earning him a nomination for the Academy Award for Best Actor.

Pelle the Conqueror was released to critical acclaim in the U.S. Roger Ebert gave it three and a half stars, comparing it to Jan Troell's The Emigrants (1971), saying Max von Sydow's Oscar nomination was "well deserved" and the novice Pelle Hvenegaard "never steps wrong." Vincent Canby, writing for The New York Times, called it "a vividly re-created, minutely detailed panorama of a particular time," and said it was a "scandal" that Von Sydow did not win Best Actor at Cannes. Peter Travers, writing for People, said that Von Sydow exhibited "wrenching simplicity and power," but the film "is maddeningly mediocre." Swedish director Ingmar Bergman told August he saw the film seven times, subsequently choosing August to direct the film The Best Intentions.

Mark Chalon Smith, writing in The Los Angeles Times in 1993, praised the film as faithful to the novel and said "Cinematographer Jorgen Persson ... captures several memorable images of the starkly beautiful Danish terrain." Time Out wrote "Despite occasional lapses into sentimentality, the film is saved by its performances and its uncluttered depiction of harsh impoverished lives," particularly praising von Sydow. In 2004, The New York Times placed the film on its list of "the Best 1,000 Movies Ever Made." Sarah Lutton, writing for the British Film Institute, named Pelle the Conqueror one of "10 great Danish films" and called Von Sydow "extraordinary." Von Sydow later also called it "a very beautiful film." The film holds an 84% rating on Rotten Tomatoes based on 25 reviews.

=== Accolades ===
Pelle the Conqueror won the Palme d'Or at the 1988 Cannes Film Festival The film also won the Academy Award for Best Foreign Language Film, 1988; it was submitted to the Academy by the Danish government, giving Denmark its second consecutive win after Babette's Feast. The Oscars ceremony also marked Max von Sydow's first nomination for the Academy Award for Best Actor.

Award	Date of ceremony	Category	Recipient(s)	Result	Ref(s)
Academy Awards	29 March 1989	Best Actor	Max von Sydow	Nominated	
Academy Awards	29 March 1989	Best Foreign Language Film	Denmark	Won	
BAFTA Awards	11 March 1990	Film Not in the English Language	Per Holst and Bille August	Nominated	
Bodil Awards	1988	Best Danish Film	Bille August	Won	
Bodil Awards	1988	Best Actor	Max von Sydow	Won	
Bodil Awards	1988	Best Supporting Actor	Björn Granath	Won	
Bodil Awards	1988	Best Supporting Actress	Karen Wegener	Won	
Cannes Film Festival	11 – 23 May 1988	Palme d'Or	Bille August	Won	
César Awards	4 March 1989	Best Film of the European Community	Bille August	Nominated	
European Film Awards	1988	Best Film	Per Holst	Nominated	
European Film Awards	1988	Best Actor	Max von Sydow	Won	
European Film Awards	1988	Best Supporting Actor	Björn Granath	Nominated	
European Film Awards	1988	Best Young Actor/Actress	Pelle Hvenegaard	Won	
Golden Globes	28 January 1989	Best Foreign Language Film	Pelle the Conqueror	Won	
Guldbagge Awards	1 February 1988	Best Film	Per Holst	Won	
Guldbagge Awards	1 February 1988	Best Actor	Max von Sydow	Won	
National Board of Review	27 February 1989	Top Foreign Films	Pelle the Conqueror	Won	
Young Artist Awards	6 May 1989	Best Foreign Film	Pelle the Conqueror	Won	
Young Artist Awards	6 May 1989	Best Young Actor in a Foreign Film	Pelle Hvenegaard	Won	

== See also ==
- List of submissions to the 61st Academy Awards for Best Foreign Language Film
- List of Danish submissions for the Academy Award for Best Foreign Language Film
