= Bernard Miall =

British translator and publisher's reader (1876–1953)

Arthur Bernard Miall (1876 – March 1953) was a British translator and publisher's reader.

Born in Croydon, he published a poem in The Yellow Book in 1897, and published a couple of volumes of poetry in the 1890s. In 1914, he became publisher's reader for Allen & Unwin.

Miall was living in Berrynarbor in Devon in 1925. He died in March 1953 in Barnstaple.

== Works ==
=== Poetry ===
- Nocturnes and pastorals: a book of verse, 1896
- Poems, 1899

=== Translations ===
- The kingdom of the Barotsi, Upper Zambezia: a voyage of exploration in Africa, returning by the Victoria Falls, Matabeleland, the Transvaal, Natal, and the Cape by Alfred Bertrand. Translated from the French Au pays des Ba-Rotsi, Haut-Zambèze. London: T.F. Unwin, 1899.
- Sister Beatrice: and Ardiane & Barbe Bleue: two plays by Maurice Maeterlinck. Translated into English verse from the French manuscript. London: George Allen, 1901.
- The French Revolution: a political history, 1789-1804 by François Victor Alphonse Aulard. Translated from the French. 4 vols, London: T. Fisher Unwin, 1910.
- The life of Jean Henri Fabre: the entomologist by Augustin Fabre. Translated from the French. London: Hodder & Stoughton, 1910.
- Brazil by Pierre Denis. London: T. F. Unwin, 1911.
- Java, Sumatra, and the other islands of the Dutch East Indies by Antoine Cabaton. London: T. Fisher Unwin, 1911.
- Tolstoy by Romain Rolland. London: T. Fisher Unwin, 1911.
- The Argentine in the twentieth century by Alberto B. Martinez and Maurice Lewandowski. London: T. Fisher Unwin, 1911.
- The Empress Eugénie and her circle by Ernest Barthez. London: T. Fisher Unwin, 1912
- Sea fisheries, their treasures and toilers by Marcel Hérubal. London: T. Fisher Unwin, 1912
- In Forbidden China. The d'Ollone mission, 1906-1909. China-Tibet-Mongolia by Henri d'Ollone. London, Leipsic: T. Fisher Unwin, 1912
- Social life in the insect world by Jean-Henri Fabre. London: T. F. Unwin, 1912.
- How France is governed by Raymond Poincaré. Translated from the French Ce que demande la cité. London, Leipsic: T. Fisher Unwin, 1913.
- The psychology of revolution by Gustave Le Bon. Translated from La Révolution française et la psychologie des révolutions. London,
- Fabre: poet of science by G. V. Legros. London; Leipsic: T. Fisher Unwin, 1913.
- (tr. with Jessie Muir) Pelle the conqueror by Martin Andersen Nexö. Translated from the Danish. London; Toronto: Sidgwick & Jackson, 1913–16.
- Modern Russia by Gregor Alexinsky. Translated from the French La Russie moderne. London: T. Fisher Unwin, 1913.
- Latin America: its rise and progress by Francisco García Calderón. London: Fisher Unwin, 1913.
- Bolivia: its people and its resources, its railways, mines and rubber-forests by Paul Walle. London: Fisher Unwin, 1914.
- Poems by Maurice Maeterlinck. London: Methuen & Co., 1915.
- Russia and the great war by Gregor Alexinsky. London: T. Fisher Unwin, 1915.
- A Frenchman's Thoughts on the War by Paul Sabatier. London: T. Fisher Unwin, 1915.
- "Frightfulness" in theory and practice as compared with Franco-British war usages by Charles Andler. Translated from the French, with additions from the German "Kriegsbrauch" and the English "Manual of military law". London: Unwin, 1916?
- Italy and the War by Jacques Bainville. London: Hodder & Stoughton, 1916.
- With wings outspread: a romance of the war of 1920 by Marc Gouvrieux. London: William Heinemann, 1916
- Belgians under the German Eagle by Jean Massart. London: T. Fisher Unwin, 1916
- 'The red robe' by Eugène Brieux. In Woman on her own: False gods; The red robe: three plays by Brieux, London: Herbert Jenkins, 1916
- The Road to Liége: the path of crime, August 1914 by Gustave Somville. With a preface by Henry Carton de Wiart. London: Hodder & Stoughton, 1916.
- Belgium in war time by Adrien de Gerlache. London: Hodder and Stoughton, 1917. (Second edition, 1918 as The Unconquerable Soul.)
- Russia and Europe by Grigory Aleksinsky. London: T. Fisher Unwin, 1917
- The bloodless war by Ezio Maria Gray. Translated from the Italian Guerra senza Sangue. London: Hodder & Stoughton, 1917
- A Spanish prisoner in a German camp: twenty-one months of captivity by Valentin Torras. London: Hodder and Stoughton, 1917.
- (tr. with Alexander Teixeira de Mattos) The Wonders of Instinct. Chapters in the psychology of insects by Jean-Henri Fabre. Translated from the French Les merveilles de l'instinct chez les insectes.. London: T. Fisher Unwin, 1918
- The secret press in Belgium by Jean Massart. Translated from the French Presse clandestine dans la Belgique occupée.. London, 1918.
- Lessons of the World-War by Augustin Hamon. London: T. Fisher Unwin, 1918
- The Physiology of Industrial Organisation and the Re-employment of the Disabled by Jules Amar. London: Library Press, 1918.
- The league of nations: the way to the world's peace by Matthias Erzberger. London; New York: Hodder and Stoughton, 1919.
- The social diseases: tuberculosis, syphilis, alcoholism, sterility by Jules Héricourt. London: G. Routledge & Sons, 1920
- The Kaiser vs. Bismarck. Suppressed letters by the Kaiser and new chapters from the autobiography of the Iron Chancellor by Otto von Bismarck. With a historical introduction by Charles Downer Hazen. New York; London: Harper & Bros. 1920. (Republished, without the introduction, as New Chapters of Bismarck's Autobiography.)
- The life of Jean Henri Fabre: the entomologist, 1823-1910 by Augustin Fabre. London: Hodder and Stoughton, Ltd, 1921.
- My years of exile: reminiscences of a socialist by Eduard Bernstein. Translated from the German Erinnerungen eines Sozialisten. Tl. 1. Aus den Jahren meines Exils. London: Leonard Parsons, 1921
- The World In Revolt: a psychological study of our times by Gustave Le Bon. Translated from the French Psychologie des temps nouveaux. London: T. Fisher Unwin, 1921.
- The Great Secret by Maurice Maeterlinck. Translated from the French Le Grand Secret. London: Methuen & Co., 1922.
- A musical tour through the land of the past by Romain Rolland. London: Kegan Paul, Trench, Trübner, 1922
- The Mystery of the Hive by Eugène Evrard. London: Methuen & Co., 1923.
- Master Johann Dietz, surgeon in the army of the Great Elector and barber to the royal court by Johann Dietz. London: G. Allen & Unwin, 1923
- (tr. with Alexander Teixeira de Mattos) The life of the scorpion by J. Henri Fabre. London: Hodder and Stoughton, 1923
- Hypnotism and suggestion by Louis Satow. London: G. Allen and Unwin, 1923.
- (tr. with Helen Chilton) The fortunes of a household by Herman Robbers. Translated from the Dutch "De Gelukkige Familie", pt. 1 of De Roman van een Gezin. New York: Alfred A. Knopf, 1924.
- Two royalist spies of the French revolution by G. Lenotre. London, T. F. Unwin, Ltd, 1924.
- Among the Brahmins and pariahs by J. A. Sauter. London: T. F. Unwin, Ltd, 1924.
- The wonder book of plant life by Jean-Henry Fabre. London: T. Fisher Unwin Ltd., 1924.
- Farm friends and foes: talks about the creatures useful to agriculture by Jean-Henri Fabre. London: T. F. unwin Ltd., 1925.
- Memoirs of a Napoleonic Officer by Jean-Baptiste Barrès. Edited, and with an introduction, by his grandson Maurice Barrès. London: G. Allen & Unwin, 1925.
- Birds and beasts of the Roman Zoo: some observations of a lover of animals by Theodor Knottnerus-Meyer.
- Ulysse and the sorcerers: or, The golden legend of a Black by Marius-Ary Leblond. New York: Frederic A. Stokes Company, 1927.
- The Borgias: Alexander VI, Caesar, Lucrezia by Giuseppe Portigliotti. Translated from the Italian. London: George Allen & Unwin Ltd., 1928.
- Richelieu by Karl Federn. London: G. Allen & Unwin, 1928.
- The life of space by Maurice Maeterlinck. London: G. Allen & Unwin Ltd., 1928.
- Some fascinating women of the renaissance by Giuseppe Portigliotti. Translated from the Italian. London: G. Allen & Unwin, 1929.
- Mysteries of the soul by Richard Müller-Freienfels. Translated from the German. London: George Allen & Unwin, 1929.
- The heavens and the universe by Oswald Thomas. Translated from the German Himmel und Welt. London: G. Allen & Unwin, 1930.
- Esponiage! by Hans Rudolf Berndorff. Translated from the German. London: E. Nash & Co., 1930.
- Caesar by Mirko Jelusich. Translated from the German. London: George Allen & Unwin, 1930.
- A naturalist in Brazil: the record of a year's observation of her flora, her fauna, and her people by Konrad Guenther. Translated from the German Das Antlitz Brasiliens. London: George Allan & Unwin, 1931
- Laura's garden by Count de Comminges. Translated from the French Dans son beau jardin. London: G. Allen & Unwin, Ltd., 1932.
- She would & she wouldn't by Helene Eliat. Translated from the French Susanne Christolais. London: Noel Douglas, 1932.
- Hans the gravedigger by Pierre Descaves and Etienne Gril. Translated from the French Hans le fossoyeur. London: Noel Douglas, 1932.
- The Death-Thorn, and other strange experiences in Peru and Panama by Alma M. Karlin. Translated from the German Der Todesdorn. London: G. Allen & Unwin, 1934
- Before the great silence by Maurice Maeterlinck. Translated from the French Avant le grand silence. London: George Allen & Unwin, 1935.
- Pigeons & spiders (The water spider) by Maurice Maeterlinck. Translated from the French. London: G. Allen & Unwin Ltd., 1935.
- Those were good days! : Reminiscences by Carl Ludwig Schleich. Translated from the German Besonnte Vergangenheit. London: G. Allen & Unwin, Ltd., 1935.
- You and the universe: modern physics for everybody by Paul Karlson. Translated from the German Du und die Natur. London: G. Allen & Unwin, Ltd., 1936.
- Conquests and discoveries of Henry the Navigator: being the chronicles of Azurara: Portuguese navigators and colonizers of the fifteenth and sixteenth centuries, edited by Virginia de Castro e Almeida with a preface by Marshal Lyautey. Translated from the French Chroniques de Gomes Eannes de Azurara. London: Allen & Unwin, 1936.
- The hour-glass by Maurice Maeterlinck. Translated from the French Le Sablier. London, 1936.
- Interviewing animals by Bastian Schmid. London: G. Allen & Unwin, 1936.
- (tr. with H. B. Weiner) Brahms: his life and work by Karl Geiringer. London: G. Allen & Unwin, Ltd., 1936.
- Anno XIIII: the conquest of an empire by Emilio de Bono, with an introduction by Benito Mussolini. Translated from the Italian. London: The Cresset Press Ltd., 1937.
- Out of my life and work by Auguste Forel. Translated from the German Rückblick auf mein Leben. London: Allen & Unwin, 1937.
- Cleopatra: the story of a queen by Emil Ludwig. London: G. Allen & Unwin, 1937.
- The gardens of Taprobane by the Count de Mauny. London: Williams and Norgate, 1937
- The wheel turns by Gian Dauli. London: Chatto and Windus, 1937.
- Gladstone by Erich Eyck. London: G. Allen & Unwin, 1938.
- (tr. with Percy Lloyd) Mipam, the Lama of the Five Wisdoms. A Tibetan novel by Lama Yongden and L. A. E. M. David-Neel. London: John Lane, 1938.
- A history of Europe from the invasions to the XVI century by Henri Pirenne. Translated from the French. London: G. Allen & Unwin, 1939.
- Chin P'ing Mei. The adventurous history of Hsi Men and his six wives. With an introduction by Arthur Waley. Translated from the German abridged version by Franz Kuhn. London: John Lane 1939.
- Mohammed and Charlemagne by Henri Pirenne. Translated from the French. London: G. Allen & Unwin, 1939.
- (tr. with H. N. R. Hardy) Buddhism: its doctrines and its methods. London: John Lane, 1939.
- (tr. with Gerald C. Wheeler) The World and the Atom by Christian Møller. Foreword by Professor Niels Bohr. Translated from Atomer og andre Smaating. London: G. Allen & Unwin, 1940.
- A mother fights Hitler by Irmgard Litten. London: George Allen & Unwin.
- From Orient to Occident. Memoirs of a doctor by Lev Weber-Bauler. London: G. Allen and Unwin, Ltd., 1940.
- A Concise History of Italy by Luigi Salvatorelli. Translated from the Italian Sommario della storia d'Italia. London: G. Allen & Unvin, 1940.
- German versus Hun by Carl Brinitzer and Berthe Grossbard. With a foreword by the Rt. Hon. Duff Cooper. London: G. Allen & Unwin ltd. [1941]
- The awakening of Western legal thought by Max Hamburger. Translated from the German. London: Allen & Unwin, [1942]
- Musical instruments: their history from the Stone Age to the present day by Karl Geiringer. London: G. Allen & Unwin Ltd., 1943.
- Old age, its compensations and rewards by Adolf Lucas Vischer. With a foreword by Lord Amulree. Translated from the German Das Alter als Schicksal und Erfüllung. London: G. Allen and Unwin, 1947.
- Not into clean hands by Louis Pauwels. Translated from the French Saint Quelqu'un. London: George Allen and Unwin, 1948.
- Mental readjustment by Sidonie Reiss. Translated from the German Lebenseinstellung und Lebensumstellung. Prefatory note by Alexandra Adler. London: G. Allen & Unwin, 1949.
- Day of Glory by René Béhaine. London: George Allen & Unwin, 1949.
- The Myth of Modernity by Charles Baudouin. London: Allen & Unwin, 1950.
- General theory of neuroses: twenty-two lectures on the biology, psychoanalysis and psychohygiene of psychosomatic disorders by Rudolf Brun. New York: International Universities Press, 1951.
- History of the world's art by Hermann Leicht. London: Spring Books, 1952.
- How to know oriental carpets and rugs by Heinrich Jacoby. Edited by R. J. La Fontaine. London: George Allen & Unwin, 1952.
- Underwater Hunting by Gilbert Doukan. Translated from the French La Chasse sous-marine. London: George Allen & Unwin, 1953.
- The Real Stalin by Yves Delbars. Translated from the French Le Vrai Staline. London: George Allen & Unwin, 1953.

=== Other ===
- Pierre Garat, Singer and Exquisite, his life and his world, 1762-1823. London; Leipsic: T. Fisher Unwin, 1913
- (ed.) French fireside poetry, with metrical translation and an introduction by Matilda Betham-Edwards. London: George Allen & Unwin, 1919.
