= Pelle Hvenegaard =

Danish actor and writer (born 1975)

- Born: 29 August 1975 (age 50); Copenhagen, Denmark
- Occupations: Actor; TV host
- Years active: 1989–present
- Spouse(s): Lotte Svendsen (2000-2001); Caroline M. Gullacksen Hvenegaard (2012-present)
- Children: 1

Pelle Hvenegaard (born 29 August 1975) is a Danish actor and writer, best known for his role in the award-winning film Pelle the Conqueror (1987).

Hvenegaard is named after the title character of Pelle from Danish author Martin Andersen Nexø's 1910 novel Pelle the Conqueror.

At age 11, director Bille August chose Hvenegaard to play the character he is named for, after the crew auditioned 3,000 children. August decided on Hvenegaard, who he said demonstrated concentration, patience and self-control.

Since 2008, Hvenegaard has been the host of Dagens Mand, the Danish version of Taken Out. In 2012, he was a host on the Danish morning talk show Go' Morgen Danmark.

== Awards and nominations ==
| Award | Category | Result | Ref(s) |
|---|---|---|---|
| European Film Awards | Best Young Actor/Actress | Won | |
| Young Artist Awards | Best Young Actor in a Foreign Film | Won | |

== Bibliography ==
- Holmstrom, John. The Moving Picture Boy: An International Encyclopaedia from 1895 to 1995. Norwich, Michael Russell, 1996, p. 396-397. ISBN 978-0-85955-178-6.
