= Erik Paaske =

Danish actor (1933–1992)

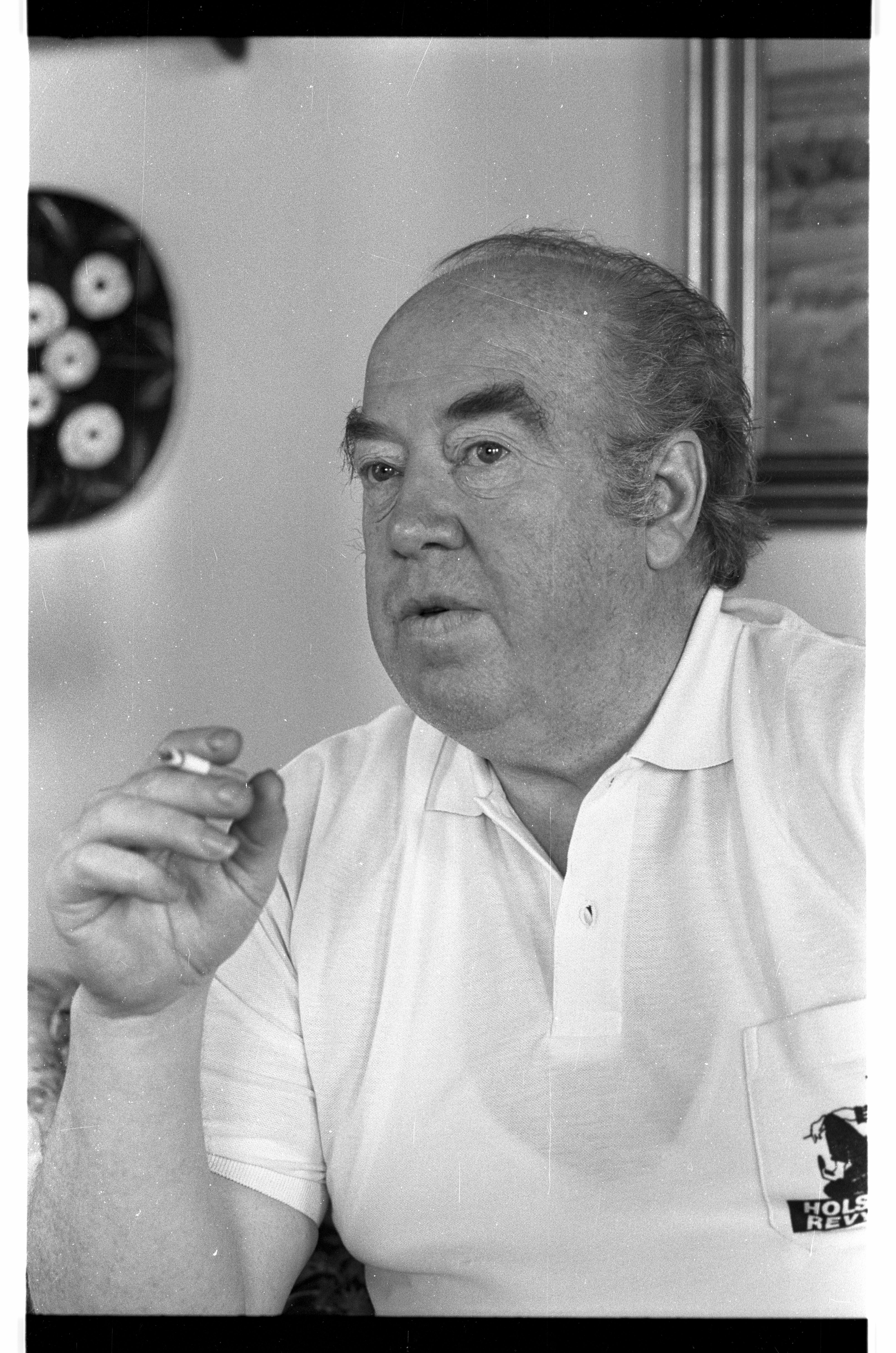
- Erik Paaske photographed in 1988 by Peter Thastum
- Born: Erik Johannes Paaske; 21 August 1933; Kolding, Denmark
- Died: 13 June 1992 (aged 58); Copenhagen, Denmark
- Education: Det Kgl. Teaters elevskole
- Occupations: Actor & singer
- Years active: 1958–1992

Erik Paaske (21 August 1933 in Kolding, Denmark – 13 June 1992 in Rigshospitalet, Copenhagen, Denmark) was a Danish theater, TV and film actor and singer.

== Early life ==
Erik Paaske was born on 21 August 1933 on Graacksvej in Kolding to father Frithjof Paaske (1900–1982) and mother Johanne Dorthea Thomassen (1898–1967). Paaske attended the local school in adjacent Strandhuse until his fourteenth year and then started his bricklayer's apprenticeship, completing it in 1952.

As a child Erik Paaske was taught to play the accordion and harmonica and was accompanying dances from the age of 10, later with his own trio of musicians. He was also active in the local Frivilligt Drenge- og Pige-Forbund scout-like organisation, playing trombone in their marching band.

== Amateur acting and acting school ==
In 1950 Erik Paaske made his first forey into acting when he joined the local amateur society Sydjydsk Amatørteater, appearing in plays such as Nitouche (1950), Den Grønne Elevator (1950), Det Lille Fyrtøj (1951), Den Elskelige Landstryger (1951) and Den Spanske Flue (1951). In 1955 he switched to KOTA (Kolding og Omegns Teateramatører), an amateur society that staged outdoor summer performances in the local castle Koldinghus.

In 1957 KOTA elected to perform William Shakespeare's En skærsommernatsdrøm (A Midsummer Night's Dream) and engaged actor Søren Weiss from the Royal Danish Theatre to direct. Erik Paaske was cast as the character Rendegarn (Nick Bottom) and Søren Weiss was so impressed by his abilities that he offered to read with Paaske for the purpose of auditioning for entry to the actor's school of the Royal Danish Theatre.

On 5 May 1958 Erik Paaske performed roles from Vor ære og magt by Nordahl Grieg and Erasmus Montanus by Ludvig Holberg in front of theatre principal Alf Henriques, directors Henning Rohde and Henning Brøndsted, and actors / teachers Poul Reumert, Else Højgaard, Martin Hansen and John Price. Erik Paaske was accepted into the school, with two others joining out of a list of 37 applicants.

== Career ==
=== Theatre ===
Erik Paaske graduated in May 1961, was immediately offered a three-year contract to appear on 100 nights per season, and worked in the ensemble until 1974. His debut role in September 1961 was that of Andrei in Anton Chekhov's De tre søstre (Three Sisters).

He was kept busy at the two Royal theatre stages, sometimes playing twice the same day. In the season 1968-69 he was the busiest actor at the venue, appearing a total of 180 times in 7 of the 9 scheduled productions.

During his tenure, Paaske's size and physical appearance made him an obvious choice for comical roles, but major character roles eluded him. In 1974 Paaske requested and was granted leave to pursue other opportunities, but as an extension was denied he decided it was time to go: "I felt it was necessary to be brave. I did not want to end up as someone taken for granted - like one of the chairs stored in the magazine."

After leaving the Royal Danish Theatre Erik Paaske worked exclusively as a freelance actor until his death.

=== Television ===
The first day of TV broadcasting in Denmark was 2 October 1951 and in the ensuing decade only small steps were taken in the theatre genre, partly by transmitting live from performances in the existing national venues, partly by enacting live plays in the TV studio. Ten years later a heated discussion erupted as to the future scope of this genre; was it time to cede the stage to modern playwrights or should the TV theatre remain easily accessible to the audience by sticking to traditional and tried-and-tested content?

Erik Paaske inadvertently became an exponent for both options. Following his appearance in two plays in 1962, he was selected as one of the three protagonists of Danish modern dramatist Leif Panduro's first commissioned TV play En af dagene, broadcast on 7 April 1963 and telling a contemporary 20th century story about office politics. This was described as the "first Danish attempt to create a modern form of TV realism." Seven months later Paaske was featured as a main character in Hosekræmmeren (The Hosier and his Daughter). Based on an 1829 short story by clergyman, author and poet Steen Steensen Blicher, this production was deeply ingrained in a 19th century rural and religious sensibility both in terms of language and narrative.

In 1967 Paaske was selected to play one of the two main characters of Leif Panduro's 6-part crime series Ka’ De li’ østers? a role that started his journey towards becoming a Danish household name. As stated by B.T. (tabloid): "After six years of bit parts at the Royal Danish Theatre, Erik Paaske jump into the TV role with a success that made the viewers identify him with the senior constable - and for the first time the reviewers were completely on his side." In an October 1967 JydskeVestkysten newspaper report it was described that Erik Paaske had "become so famous that people turn around on the street when they see him."

==== TV appearances ====
Play title	Title in original language	Author	Role	First broadcast
Georg Dandin	George Dandin ou le Mari confondu	Molière	Colin	06.01.1962
Nu vågne alle	Bedtime Story	Sean O 'Casey	John Jo Mulligan	26.11.1962
Skovtur på slagmarken	Pique-nique en campagne	Fernando Arrabal	2. Red Cross man	09.01.1963
En af dagene		Leif Panduro	Normann	06.03.1963
Paladsrevolutionen		Sven Clausen	Suhm	11.04.1963
Hosekræmmeren		Steen Steensen Blicher	Esben	24.11.1963
Den stundesløse		Ludvig Holberg	Christen Griffel	26.12.1963
Natteherberget				28.10.1964
I rum sø	Na pełnym morzu	Sławomir Mrożek	A mailman	20.11.1964
Stillads		Sandro Key-Åberg & Peter Ronild		04.10.1966
Stillads 2		Peter Ronild	A man	06.12.1966
Kontoristerne				06.04.1966
Ka' De li' østers?				6 part series, first episode 09.09.1967
En nat i Roskilde				02.04.1968
Cirkulæret				08.04.1971
Karrig niding				26.01.1969
Vægteren				12.08.1969
Den fine mand				01.01.1971
Erotik				08.04.1971
Tykke Olsen				20.05.1971
Livsens ondskab				episodes 1-4, 09.04.1972
Fire portrætter				14.05.1972
Solens børn				27.08.1972
Stoppested				29.11.1972
Dr. Knock				13.01.1973
Vinterbyøster				voice, 01.12.1973
Dialog på skærmen				18.05.1974
Uvejr				15.09.1980
Strømmens dag				09.02.1981
Uvejr				15.09.1980
Strømmens dag				09.02.1981
Gøngehøvdingen				09.02.1981

=== Film ===
Erik Paaske worked in films intermittently throughout his career, almost exclusively in smaller parts. His largest role was in Bille August's Pelle the Conqueror, the film winning both the Palme d'Or in Cannes and the Academy Award for Best International Feature Film in 1988.

==== Filmography ====
- Ditte, Child of Man (1946)
- Crazy Paradise (1962)
- Weekend (1962)
- Paradise and Back (1964)
- Sådan er de alle (1968)
- Det er så synd for farmand (1968)
- Stormvarsel (1968)
- Mordskab (1969)
- Me and My Kid Brother and Doggie (1969)
- Den røde rubin (1970)
- Hovedjægerne (1971)
- Thorvald og Linda (1982)
- Otto er et næsehorn (1983)
- Walter og Carlo - Yes det er far (1986)
- Hip Hip Hurrah! (film) (1987)
- Pelle the Conqueror (1987)
- Katinka (film) (1988)
- Casanova (1990)

=== Recording artist ===
As a young amateur performer Erik Paaske demonstrated a talent for singing and in the summer of 1958 he appeared in a semi-professional capacity in the local Kolding variety theatre Sans Souci. Parallel to his work at the theatre Paaske continued in this genre, appearing in May 1962 in Simon Rosenbaum's cabaret together with Henry Lohmann Paaske's abilities were noticed and in 1970 he was offered his first contract by Quick Record, singing 13 traditional Danish 20th century cabaret and folk songs on his first album "Mine yndlingsviser."

Erik Paaske was featured on a total of 18 records on Quick Record, Carl Petter, Hamlet and Mermaid (as well as an unknown number of compilations), selling 170.000 copies during his contract with Quick Record / Carl Petter.

==== Discography ====
Title	Details	Producer	Musical Director	Studio	Engineer
Mine yndlingsviser	Released 1970; Label: Quick Record; Format: LP (QRLP 501)		Hans Peder Åse		
Mine yndlingsviser II	Released 1971; Label: Quick Record; Format: LP (QRLP 504)	Quick Record	Hans Peder Åse	Alto Studio	Helge Albrechtsen
Mine yndlingsviser III	Released 1972; Label: Quick Record; Format: LP (QRLP 509)		Hans Peder Åse		Helge Albrechtsen
Vise Romantik	Released 1973; Label: Quick Record; Format: LP (QLP 2005)		Hans-Ole Nielsen		
Mine yndlingsviser IIII	Released 1974; Label: Carl Petter; Format: LP (412-12), MC (420-12)	Carl Petersen	Erik Bæk	Quali Sound Studio	Palle Juul
Mine Yndlingssange	Released 1975; Label: Carl Petter; Format: LP (412-20), MC (420-20)	Carl Petersen	Poul Godske		Helge Albrechtsen
Erik Paaske synger viser af Sigfred Pedersen og Hans Hartvig Seedorff	Released 1976; Label: Carl Petter; Format: LP (812-13), MC (820-13)	Carl Petersen			
Danske Sange & Digte (with Ole Jensen)	Released 1976; Label: Quick Record; Format: LP (QSLP 3001)		Hans Peder Åse (music) Henning Pade (poems)		
Julens salmer og sange	Released 1976; Label: Carl Petter; Format: LP (812-15), MC (820-15)	Carl Petersen	Side 1: accompanied by organist Bente Frendrup Side 2: Paul Godske	Side 1: Abbey of Our Lady, Aalborg Side 2: Wifos Studio	
Mine yndlingsREVYviser	Label: Carl Petter; Format: LP (312-03), MC (320-03)	Carl Petersen	Hans-Ole Nielsen	Rosenberg Studio	Ivar Rosenberg
Portræt Af En Bums	Released 1979; Label: Hamlet; Format: LP (HPLP-1017), CD (HAM00031-2)	Willy Grevelund / Eugen Tajmer	Willy Grevelund	Rosenberg Studio	Ivar Rosenberg
Erik Paaske Synger Salmer	Released 1979; Label: Hamlet; Format: LP (HPLP-1022), MC (HPMC-2022)	Eugen Tajmer / Willy Grevelund	Willy Grevelund		Ivar Rosenberg
Nye Viser Om Kærlighed	Released 1980; Label: Hamlet; Format: LP (HPLP-1053), CD (HAM00036-2)	Eugen Tajmer	Willy Grevelund	Wifos Studio	
Hvis jeg var en rig mand	Released 1980; Label: Hamlet; Format: LP (HPLP-1049), CD (HAM00006-2)	Eugen Tajmer / Willy Grevelund	Willy Grevelund		Birger Swahn
Til mor	Released 1986; Label: Mermaid; Format: LP (020187)	Per Sørensen	Willy Grevelund	Studio 39	Hans Nielsen
Nu Har Vi Altså Jul Igen	Released 1987; Label: Mermaid; Format: LP (060987)				
Arbejdersange - Sange Min Far Lærte Mig	Released 1989; Label: Mermaid; Format: LP (751089), CD (CD751089)	Per Sørensen	Willy Grevelund	Sun Studio	
Erik Paaske Synger Evert Taube	Released 1989; Label: Mermaid; Format CD (1090990)	Per Sørensen	Willy Grevelund		Bjarne Hansen

== Personal life ==
In October 1961 Erik Paaske announced his engagement to actress Elsebet Knudsen. They married on 20 January 1962 in the Nørre Bjert village church. According to Paaske the marriage lasted only three months, as the couple "quickly found out that it was based on a misunderstanding. ... I had been accepted to a position at the theatre, had been on TV and radio, and this success had to be crowned with me marrying a pretty girl."

In 1965 Erik Paaske met "assistent i Centralarbejdsanvisningskontoret" ("clerk at the central labour exchange") Margit Jensen (20 September 1937 - 17 May 2016) at a private party and they started cohabiting in 1966. The couple married on 23 December 1970, the union lasting until Paaske's death.

== Death ==
In September 1991 the tabloid Ekstra Bladet first reported that Erik Paaske had been seriously ill with a kidney disease the previous winter, announcing as front page news that after recuperating he had returned to the stage on 18 September to perform in Ödön von Horváth's Tro, håb og kærlighed (Faith, Hope, and Charity). The article spoke of industry rumours that Paaske "was dying, had cancer etc." but this he denied. In December 1991 Paaske was rushed from theatre rehearsals to the operating table and forced to give up his leading role in Jens Christian Hostrup's En Spurv i Tranedans (A Sparrow in a Dance of Cranes), not returning to the production.

In April 1992 Folketeatret director Preben Harris announced that Erik Paaske would return to the stage in September to play the main role in Carl Erik Soya's Parasitterne (The Parasites).

On 17 June 1992 the main national Danish broadsheets and tabloid newspapers all reported as front page news that Erik Paaske had died at the age of 58.

As reported by B.T. (tabloid) Paaske succumbed to kidney cancer on the morning of 13 June at the Copenhagen hospital Rigshospitalet. It was revealed by the family that he had fought the disease since April 1991, at the time forced to leave his leading role as Tevye in the production of Fiddler on the Roof at Nørrebros Theater.

Erik Paaske is buried at Frederiksberg Ældre Kirkegård.

== Legacy ==
Writing in Berlingske Tidende, theatre critic Jens Kistrup said about Erik Paaske: "Has Danish theatre since Olaf Poulsen had an actor with the same scope and same penetration? ...with a warm connection to the folksy that not only made him popular, but also loved.” ... “At his height in the late seventies and throughout the eighties [Erik Paaske] became one of our greatest actors ever. With his death Danish theatre, in fact the whole nation suffers a loss that without exaggeration can be said as being impossible to replace."

Bent Mohn in Politiken described Paaske as "festive and popular. And then heartfelt and dangerous. ... This made him loved and admired."

In Jyllands-Posten Jens Bech wrote that Erik Paaske "was one of our most distinguished character actors" with "an amazing singing ability."

Mogens Garde in B.T. designated Paaske as "a central figure in the Danish theatre life. He had pondus and strength for the - preferably humorous - character figures that awaited him."

Songs from Erik Paaske's recordings are still being played on the Danish public service radio DR Radio, with the top titles "Sådan en aften sku' man være 20 år," "Nu har vi altså jul igen" and "Hvis jeg var en rig mand" (original "If I Were a Rich Man" from the musical Fiddler on the Roof) played 80, 57 and 44 times since 2010 (as of May 2025).

On the streaming platform Spotify Erik Paaske had an average of 2,991 monthly listeners as of May 2025, with "Vinterbyøster" being the most played track.
