= Psychology of film =

Sub-field of the psychology of art

The psychology of film is a sub-field of the psychology of art that studies the characteristics of film and its production in relation to perception, cognition, narrative understanding, and emotion. A growing number of psychological scientists and brain scientists have begun conducting empirical studies that describe the cognitive and biological underpinnings of motion pictures or what has been called psychocinematics. Early theoretical approaches included works by psychologists Hugo Münsterberg and Rudolf Arnheim. Cognitive film theorists David Bordwell and Noël Carroll fostered its philosophical underpinnings.

== Sensory features ==
Film is rather unusual as it involves an integration of visual and auditory stimuli. In narrative films, plots are guided by camera placement and movement, dialogue, sound effects, and editing. Some aspects of film are driven by bottom-up or sensory guided factors (such as light, motion or sound), whereas other aspects depend more on top-down or conceptually driven factors, like past experiences and internal motivations.

=== Editing ===
Cuts and flashbacks represent types of editing that alter the normal temporal sequencing of events, creating non-linear narrative structures. Editing creates the transition between events. Research focusing on recall ability for linear versus non-linear narratives suggests that temporal changes impact memory of events, but not comprehension.

Film cuts are instantaneous, perceptual, and sometimes temporal discontinuities that do not exist in our own realities. However, despite this, viewers accept cuts as a natural storytelling technique in film. Even though we see reality in a continuous flow of linked images, in movies, cuts seem to work, regardless of how experienced a viewer is. Walter Murch suggests that this is because viewers are in fact used to cuts in their everyday lives through the act of blinking. When you turn to look at an object, for example, you normally blink, thus creating a visual break in continuity between what you were looking at and what you are now looking at. Another possibility that Murch explores to explain humans' innate acceptance of film cuts is the way in which we dream. Our dreams tend to jump around from place to place and situation to situation without any real sense of continuity. Thus the oneiric nature of films is familiar to viewers and allows them to innately understand the editing despite discontinuities.

Schwan & Ildirar (2010), who focused solely on inexperienced viewers' ability to comprehend film, found that the comprehensibility of films was determined by whether or not they followed a familiar line of action. Overall, our brains accept the perceptual discontinuities found in films, but it is ultimately easier for viewers, regardless of their experience, to understand cuts that follow a continuous and familiar line of action as opposed to ones that are more discontinuous. When a familiar line is not present, more experienced viewers are significantly better at comprehending a complex narrative by "filtering" out editing discontinuities. In the end, however, montage linearity that creates temporal continuity is more important than plot for recall and understanding of a narrative's events.

=== Sequence of events ===
Cognitive neuroscience research demonstrates that some movies can exert considerable control over brain activity and eye movements. Studying the neuroscience of film is based on the hypothesis that some films, or film segments, lead viewers through a similar sequence of perceptual, emotional and cognitive states. Using fMRI brain imaging, researchers asked participants to watch 30 minutes of The Good, the Bad and the Ugly (1966) as they lay on their backs in the MRI scanner. Despite the seemingly uncontrolled task and complex nature of the stimulus, brain activity was similar across viewers' brains, particularly in spatiotemporal areas. When compared to a random sequence of scenes, the specific order of events seemed to be strongly associated with this similarity in brain activity. It was also determined that the level of control a movie has on someone's mental state is highly dependent upon the cinematic devices (pans, cuts and close-ups) it contains. Tightly edited films exert more control on brain activity and eye-movement than open-ended films. However, similar eye-movement and similarity in visual processing does not guarantee similar brain responses. In addition, the average correlation in taste between individual viewers is rather low and not well predicted by film critics.

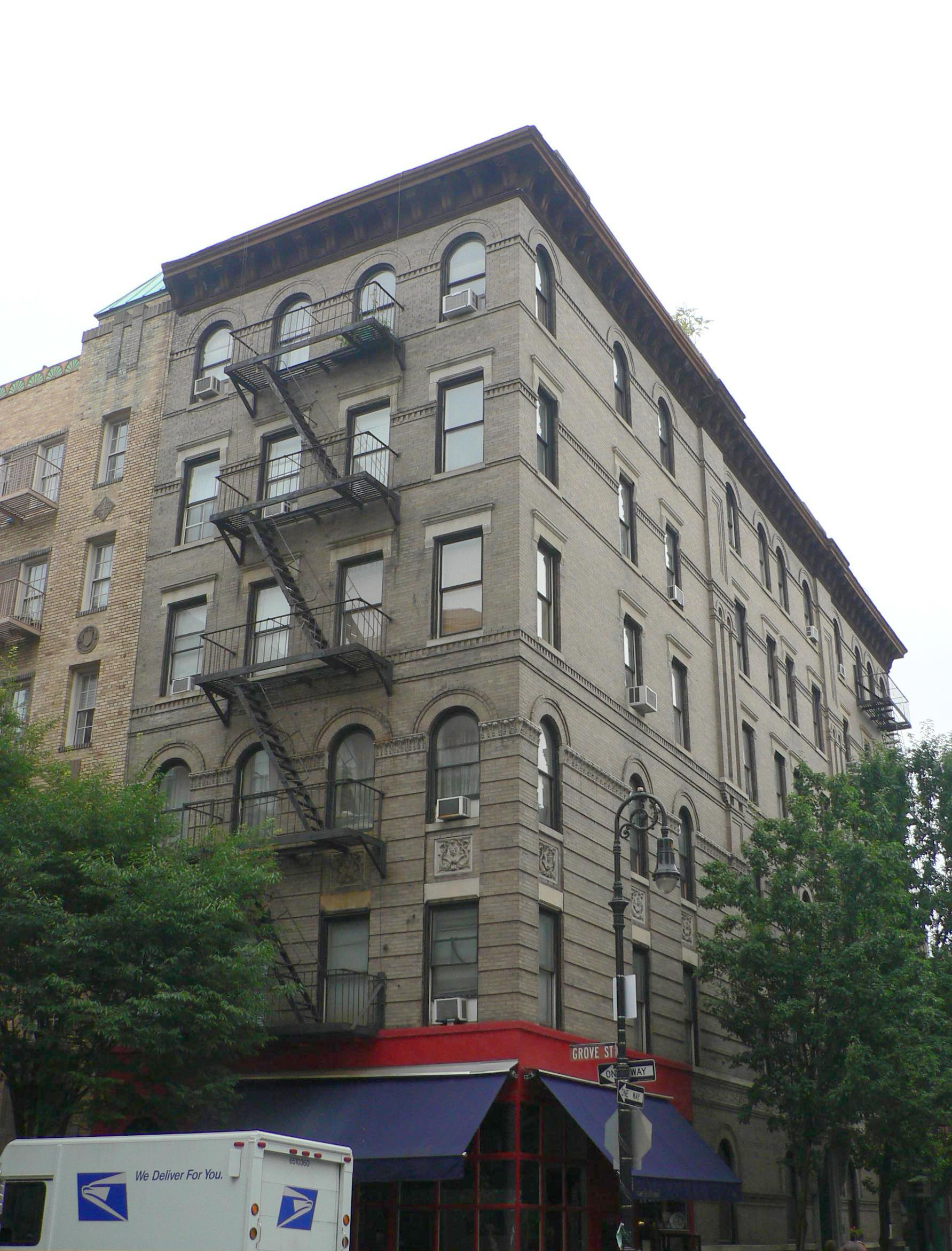
The Greenwich Village building seen in TV series Friends

=== Spatial information ===
Viewing spaces on screen from a stable point of view is important for short-term spatial coding and long term spatial memory. Long-time viewers of the television show Friends were significantly better at accurately recalling spatial information about the show's set, because the camera never moves away from the "fourth wall". Equally experienced viewers of the show "E.R." were less likely to recall information about the set and be able to mentally orient themselves inside it, because the show is filmed from many different angles.

In one study, observers were instructed to look at short movies involving changes in point of view. They used 15 movie clips featuring a handbag, whose properties (color, position, identity, and shape) were manipulated across cuts. Observers' reactions were recorded by examining eye-movement, changes in behavior and memory performance. The researchers later asked the observers if they had noticed anything unusual occur during the clips, without directly referring to the handbag. Changing the position of objects, i.e. the handbag, between scenes was the only variable that did not appear to affect eye-movement or memory. Overall, observers were more likely to draw their attention and look sooner at the handbag-stimulus at the moment right after its properties changed. When specifically asked about it, they were more likely to describe the handbag in terms of its post-cut properties, after a change had occurred. Even though their visual system appeared to pick up on the changes, observers were not consciously aware of them or able to report noticeable differences across cuts. The results illustrate that observers construct and maintain internal visual representations of complex visual environments while viewing dynamic scenes. This also helps explain why movie viewers usually are not aware of continuity errors in editing.

=== Cinematic techniques ===
Cinematic techniques are often regarded as grammatical structures or components of the cinematic art as a language made up of images. A period of visual adaptation is necessary before being able to understand images in movies or on television. Viewers need sufficient exposure to cinematic techniques and the meanings attributed to them to adequately interpret the images on the screen. At a very young age, we learn how to watch videos and understand different editing techniques. One study looked at adult participants who had very little exposure to film to see if they were able to understand simple editing techniques, such as point of view shots, establishing shots, pan shots, shot/reverse shot, ellipsis of time, and cross-cutting. These viewers were able to understand some of the techniques, such as ellipses of time; however, more complex techniques, like shot/reverse shot were more difficult for them to understand.

Some filmmaking techniques derive meaning through past experiences or ideologies that influence the way viewers see certain images or sequence of images. An example of this would be how camera angles can affect our perception of what is occurring on screen. Low angle shots in which the camera is pointed up at a subject tend to make the subject appear more powerful or stronger. While high angle shots can make a subject appear weaker. These interpretations of camera angles, however, ultimately derive from the notion that bigger is better. The lateral movement of a subject across the screen can also influence an audience's interpretation of the subject. For example, characters that move from left-to-right are perceived more positively than characters who move right-to-left. This partiality toward rightward movement likely has its roots in the predominance of right-handedness in society, as well as the practice of reading left-to-right in Western languages.

==== Changes in film techniques ====
One study compiled data on the changing trends in techniques by examining 160 English-language films released from 1935 to 2010. The findings demonstrate that over time shot lengths have become shorter, while the shorter the shot the more motion it is likely to contain. In addition, contemporary films have significantly more motion and movement than older ones. Motion is the optical change created by moving objects, people, and shadows; movement is that change created by camera motion or gradual lens change. Presumably, the film industry has capitalized on the results of previous psychological research that shows motion and the onset of motion, captures our attention. Finally, films have become darker over time, as the overall brightness of the images on the movie screen has decreased.

These changes in film-making choices increase attention manipulation and are thought to facilitate comprehension.

== Top-down factors ==
Top-down factors refer to expectations and background knowledge that influence viewers' perception, understanding and appreciation of film. Expertise, attention and eye-movements are top-down factors that guide how viewers experience film.

=== Expertise and awareness of audience manipulation ===
Explicit awareness about the processes by which meaning is created by the visual media could be regarded as one measure of film expertise and sophistication. Increased awareness of the subtle techniques employed by filmmakers to "manipulate" audiences leads to increased admiration and aesthetic responses to film, as in other forms of visual art. Researchers have identified a strong relationship between prior film experience and conscious awareness of visual manipulations, especially for people with practical experience in production.

One study compared the participants' ability to understand narrative in Hollywood versus experimental film, by measuring interpretational awareness. Subjects with significant, moderate and no formal background or experience in film viewed a film that contained both scenes with Hollywood-style and experimental-style editing. Regardless of expertise level, participants described the Hollywood-like scenes in "naturalistic terms," as if their events had occurred in reality and tended not to make explicit references to stylistic techniques. This interpretational tendency reflects Hollywood's "invisible style." When describing the experimental scenes, inexperienced viewers struggled to construct a cohesive "naturalistic" narrative. More experienced viewers were more likely to make explicit reference to the "breaking of conventions" and the intentions behind them.

Film editing seems to be a barrier of awareness for conventional Hollywood-type movies, as they create an illusion of "real life".

=== Segmentation ===
Segmentation or event segmentation is a fundamental component of attention that facilitates understanding, object recognition and planning. Event segmentation constitutes breaking down dynamic scenes into spatial and temporal parts or units of events.

Event segmentation is viewed as "the brain's cutting-room floor." It is considered to be an automatic and ongoing process that depends on meaningful changes in a perceived situation. To test this, researchers measured brain activity while participants viewed an extended narrative film. They used MRI scanning to show transient evoked brain responses (changes in brain activity) at those points they identified as event boundaries (changes in situation). Situational changes were coded frame by frame into spatial, temporal, object, character, causal and goal changes. Participants were then instructed to perform an event segmentation task by watching a movie and pressing a button to identify units of activity that were natural and meaningful to them. Paying attention to situational changes gives rise to a neural cascade that is consciously perceived at the end of one event and the beginning of another.

According to Event Segmentation Theory (EST), the perception of event boundaries is a side effect of prediction during ongoing perception. Prediction is an adaptive mechanism made up of cognitive event models that represent "what is going on now" to create expectations and attentive biases for ongoing processing. Prediction errors occur at situational changes and cause information processing segmentation.

Broader narrative comprehension theories have also been applied to the perception and memory of movies. This reflects the hypothesis that the same mechanisms are used to understanding stories and real life. In one study, researchers illustrated the common episodic structure between text and film, by asking participants to match a constructed text story to the dialogueless movie The Red Balloon. This task required participants to locate episodes and their components within the cinematic story: exposition, complication and resolution.

=== Eye-movement ===
Using an eyetracker, researchers have discovered a strong center-of-screen bias with a distribution of gaze points approximately peaking at the screen center. However, eye gazes rarely focus on the same location. Visual dispersion across the screen increases over time and particularly, after repeated exposure to the same video stimulus. Because of this, there is greater gaze dispersion when viewers are watching advertisements compared to a television show.

== See also ==
- Psychoanalytic film theory
