= Experimental aesthetics =

Field of psychology

Experimental aesthetics is a field of psychology founded by Gustav Theodor Fechner in the 19th century. According to Fechner, aesthetics is an experiential perception which is empirically comprehensible in light of the characteristics of the subject undergoing the experience and those of the object. Experimental aesthetics is the second oldest research area in psychology, psychophysics being the only field which is older. In his central work Introduction to Aesthetics (Vorschule der Ästhetik) Fechner describes his empirical approach extensively and in detail. Experimental aesthetics is characterized by a subject-based, inductive approach.

Nowadays, psychologists and neuroscientists define the field of aesthetics more narrowly as considering the perception, creation, and evaluation of objects that evoke an intense feeling. It is a specialized sub-field of empirical aesthetics that distinguishes itself by using experiments to test causal hypotheses. In contrast, empirical aesthetics also embraces survey studies, field observations, and other non-experimental methods. The field has developed significantly over the past few decades. On the one hand, through the continuous development of cognitive and emotional models of the description of aesthetic experience, taking into account various psychological variables. On the other hand, through refined laboratory experiments, concerning specific questions but also diverse attempts to research aesthetic experiences in contexts that are typical for them, such as museums).

Experimental aesthetics is strongly oriented towards the natural sciences. Modern approaches mostly come from the fields of cognitive psychology or neuroscience (a.k.a. neuroaesthetics).

== Methodology ==
The analysis of individual experience and behavior based on experimental methods is a central part of experimental aesthetics. In particular, the perception of works of art, music, or modern items such as websites or other IT products is studied. Data can be examined and analyzed at three levels:

1. Physiological level
2. Phenomenological level (experience)
3. Behavioral level

Here it is difficult to assign an absolute value to the aesthetics of an object. However, one can measure, for example, what percentage of subjects classify an object as beautiful or how many prefer this object to others.

Depending on the approach, a number of different methods are used in experimental aesthetics, such as pairwise comparisons, rank order methods, Likert scales and semantic differentials, production methods, statistical comparisons of groups, reaction time measurements, and also more complex methods such as eye tracking, electroencephalography, and functional magnetic resonance imaging.

== See also ==
- Psychology of art
- Processing fluency theory of aesthetic pleasure
