= Sidonie Reiss =

Adlerian psychotherapist

Sidonie Reiss (1882-1970) was an Adlerian psychotherapist and child psychologist.

== Life ==
Reiss was born on April 27, 1882. After attending a Berlin lecture by Alfred Adler in the early 1920s she joined the local Adlerian society and underwent training analysis with Fritz Künkel. In 1933 she emigrated to the Netherlands, where she attended an Amsterdam lecture series delivered by Adler. She recommended one of her patients to Adler, though Adler declined to take the patient from her.

Reiss later moved to the United States. Her German typescript Lebenseinstellung und Lebensumstellung was translated into English by Bernard Miall, and published as Mental Readjustment (1949). Reiss worked as a psychotherapist at the Alfred Adler Mental Hygiene Clinic in New York. She died in September 1970.

== Works ==
- Mental Readjustment. London: Allen & Unwin, 1949. Translated by Bernard Miall. With prefaratory notes by Alexandra Adler.
- 'Psychotherapy in a Case of Chronic Illness', in Kurt A. Adler and Danica Deutsch (eds.) Essays in Individual Psychology, Grove Press, 1959, pp. 382–399
