= Where Mountains Float =

1955 film

- Poster by Børge Bjørnbøl
- Directed by: Bjarne Henning-Jensen
- Written by: Bjarne Henning-Jensen
- Narrated by: Lars Henning-Jensen
- Cinematography: Werner Hedman; George Stretton
- Music by: Herman D. Koppel
- Release date: 22 December 1955
- Running time: 49 minutes
- Country: Denmark
- Language: Danish

Where Mountains Float (Danish: Hvor bjergene sejler) is a 1955 Danish documentary film directed by Bjarne Henning-Jensen. It was nominated for an Academy Award for Best Documentary Feature and won the Bodil Award for Best Documentary.

== Cast ==
- Lars Henning-Jensen as Narrator
