= Jørgen Haugan =

Norwegian author and lecturer (born 1941)

Jørgen Haugan (born 1941) in Trondheim is a Norwegian author and lecturer. He was written a number of books, principally biographies of noted Scandinavian writers.

Haugan earned a doctorate in philosophy in 1977 from the University of Copenhagen with a thesis on Henrik Ibsen.

Haugan received the Georg Brandes award for his biography of Martin Andersen Nexø in 1999. Haugan completed his biography of Knut Hamsun in 2004. Haugan works as a lecturer in the Department of Scandinavian Studies and Linguistics at the University of Copenhagen. He had previously worked at the University of Trondheim.

== Selected bibliography ==
- Henrik Ibsens metode: Den indre utvikling gjennem Ibsens dramatikk (Oslo, 1977)
- Diktersfinxen - En studie i Ibsen og Ibsen-forskningen (Oslo, 1982)
- 400 Årsnatten - Norsk Selvforståelse Ved En Korsvei (Oslo, 1991)
- Alt Er Som Bekendt Erotik - En Biografi Om Martin Andersen Nexø (Copenhagen, 1998)
- Solgudens fall. Knut Hamsun, en litterær biografi (Oslo, 2004)
