= Paw (film) =

- Poster with the film's alternative title: Boy of Two Worlds
- Directed by: Astrid Henning-Jensen
- Screenplay by: Astrid Henning-Jensen; Bjarne Henning-Jensen
- Based on: Paw. En dansk Indianerdrengs Eventyr. by Torry Gredsted
- Produced by: Mogens Skot-Hansen
- Starring: Jimmy Sterman
- Cinematography: Henning Bendtsen
- Edited by: Anker Sørensen
- Music by: Herman D. Koppel
- Production company: Laterna Film
- Distributed by: G. G. Communications (U.S.)
- Release date: 18 December 1959 (Denmark)
- Running time: 100 minutes (Denmark); 88 minutes (U.S.)
- Country: Denmark
- Language: Danish

Paw (also known as Boy of Two Worlds) is a 1959 Danish film directed by Astrid Henning-Jensen. It tells the story of a boy from the Caribbean who, affected by the deaths of his parents and maiden aunt, escapes to the Danish forest.

== Plot ==
Paw, a twelve-year-old orphan, arrives in Denmark accompanied by his late father's best friend, as his mother from the Caribbean and his Danish father died at his birth. He's to live with his unfamiliar Aunt Bo, who had only cared for her canaries until now. The urbanized country is quite foreign to Paw, leading to one culture shock after another. Rejected by his new environment, he escapes to a nearby Danish forest where he meets the Swedish poacher Anders, forming a close bond.

When Aunt Bo falls ill and dies, Paw is once again left without a family. However, a strong friendship has developed between him and Anders. When discussions arise about placing Paw in an orphanage, Anders steps in and offers to officially care for him. The forest becomes Paw's sanctuary, where he and Anders roam together, sharing survival skills. They try to evade the disapproval of a local landowner, but when Anders is arrested for poaching, Paw is sent to an orphanage. Confused and longing for his friend, Paw escapes again, finding solace on a nature reserve island where he befriends a young fox he saved. Meanwhile, the village assumes Paw has returned to the Caribbean. Once free, Anders locates Paw, renewing their bond.

== Cast ==
- Edvin Adolphson as Anders
- Jimmy Sterman as Paw
- Asbjørn Andersen as Gutsbesitzer
- Ninja Tholstrup as Yvonne
- Helge Kjærulff-Schmidt as Lehrer
- Karen Lykkehus as Fräulein Bo
- Preben Neergaard as Søofficer
- Karl Stegger as Betjent Hansen
- Ebba Amfeldt as Fru Hansen
- Svend Bille as Onkel Pot
- Ego Brønnum-Jacobsen as Mand ved skydetelt
- Otto Hallstrøm
- Mogens Hermansen as Godsejerens skytte
- Grethe Høholdt as Betjentens datter Inger
- Finn Lassen as Forstander på børnehjemmet

== Release and reception ==
Paw was originally released in Denmark in December 1959. It was nominated for the Academy Award for Best Foreign Language Film and was entered into the 1960 Cannes Film Festival. In the United States, the film was released in April 1970 by G. G. Communications under the title Boy from Two Worlds; twelve minutes were cut from the original 100-minute running time. In his Family Guide to Movies on Video, Henry Herx deemed it "a very engaging children's movie ... that will also interest adults".

== See also ==
- List of submissions to the 32nd Academy Awards for Best Foreign Language Film
- List of Danish submissions for the Academy Award for Best Foreign Language Film
