= Pelle the Conqueror (novel) =

Novel by Martin Andersen Nexø

- Author: Martin Andersen Nexø
- Original title: Pelle Erobreren
- Language: Danish
- Published: 1906–1910
- Publication place: Denmark

Pelle the Conqueror (Danish: Pelle Erobreren) is a Danish novel written by Martin Andersen Nexø. The book was published in four volumes, beginning with Boyhood in 1906, followed by Apprenticeship in 1907 and The Great Struggle in 1909 and concluding with Daybreak in 1910.

The novel follows the character Pelle Karlsson, who immigrates to Denmark from Sweden in 1877 at age eight. At 18, he moves from Bornholm to Copenhagen, and becomes a leader in the labour movement in Denmark, motivated by poor working conditions.

== Analysis ==
Nexø based the novel on many of the experiences in his own life. While written as a biography of a fictional character, Pelle the Conqueror reports on widespread economic and historic social matters. The format is of a Bildungsroman.

The novel was translated into English by Jesse Muir and Bernard Miall in 1913–1916. Despite this, it is not a popular novel in the English-speaking world. Pelle the Conqueror has been compared to Les Misérables.

== Adaptations ==
In 1987, a Danish–Swedish film adaptation directed by Bille August was released. August chose to adapt the novel because it is considered essential reading in Denmark. It starred Pelle Hvenegaard as the young Pelle and Max von Sydow, and won the Palme d'Or at the 1988 Cannes Film Festival, the 1988 Academy Award for Best Foreign Language Film and numerous other awards.

In 2017, HBO Nordic and SAM Productions announced they were producing an eight-hour miniseries The Conqueror, written by Rasmus Heisterberg and based on Nexø's Apprenticeship, The Great Struggle and Daybreak. In 2019 the miniseries was cancelled, because of budget constraints. As per Danish copyright law, the book entered the public domain on 1 January 2025, 70 full calendar years after Nexø’s death on 1 June 1954.
