= Jean Massart =

Belgian botanist

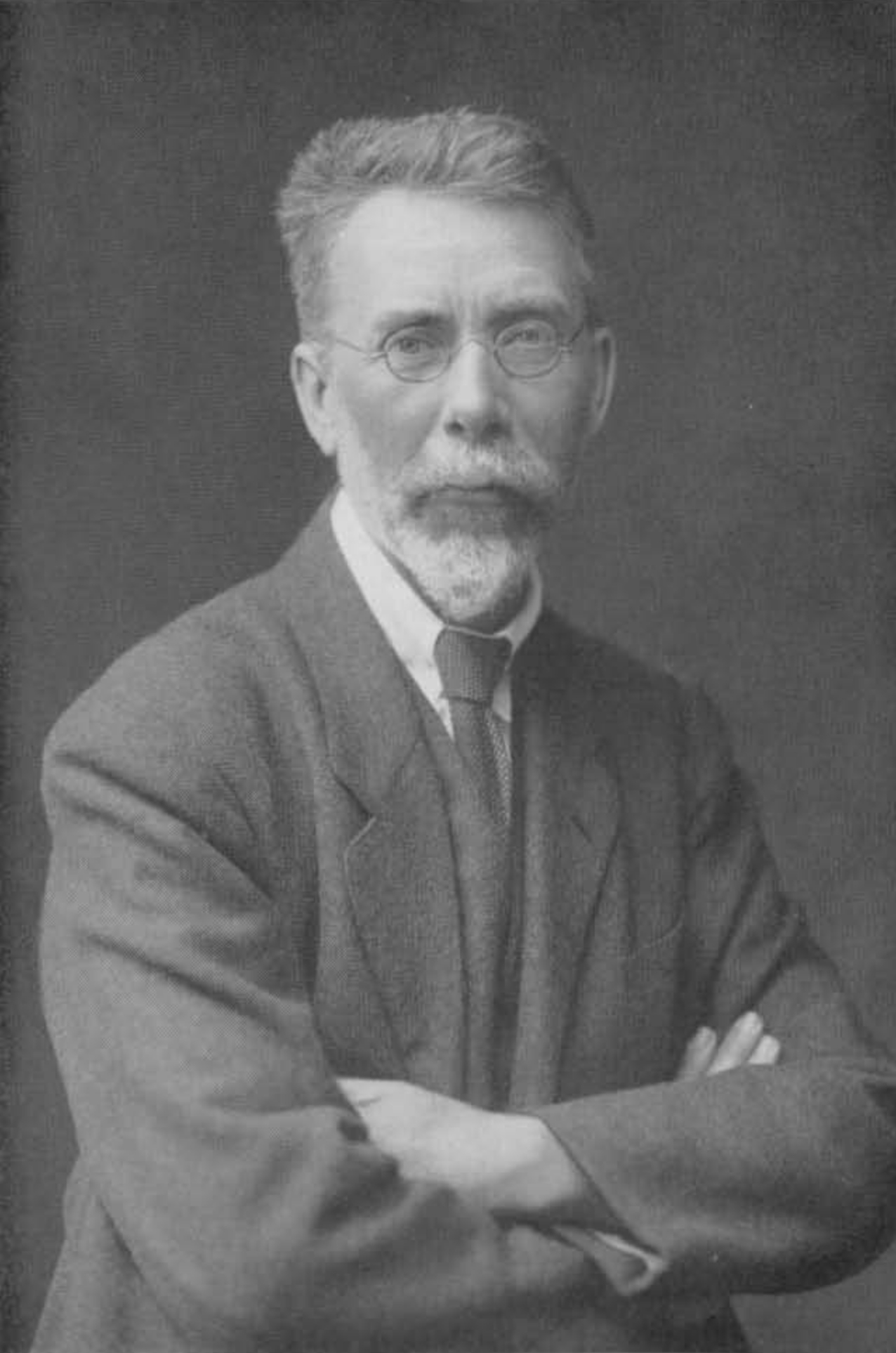
Jean Massart

Jean Massart (7 March 1865 in Etterbeek – 16 August 1925) was a Belgian botanist.

== Biography ==
In 1894 he earned his PhD from the University of Brussels, where later in his career he worked as a professor. From 1902 to 1906 he was curator of the Jardin botanique de l'État in Brussels. In this role he developed new planting designs that were based on ethology and phylogeny.

In 1894/95 he collected botanical specimens in Java and Sumatra, and in 1922/23, he was in charge of an expedition to Brazil.

He is remembered for his phytogeographical investigations of Belgium, which he published in the highly regarded Esquisse de la géographie botanique de la Belgique (1910). He was also at the forefront of nature conservation concerns in his home country. Today, the Jardin botanique Jean Massart at Brussels commemorates his name.

== Taxa ==
- Massartia, a fungus genus circumscribed by Émile Auguste Joseph De Wildeman in 1897; (order Zoopagales).
- Massartina; plant genus circumscribed by René Maire in 1925; (family Boraginaceae).

== Selected works ==
- L'évolution régressive en biologie et en sociologie, 1897, with Jean Demoor and Emile Vandervelde, later translated into English by Mrs. Chalmers Mitchell and published as "Evolution by atrophy in biology and sociology" (1899).
- Recueil de l'Institut botanique Léo Errera, 1902 – Collections at the botanical institute of Leo Errera.
- Un jardin botanique pour les écoles moyennes, 1902 – A botanical garden for middle schools.
- Essai de géographie botanique des districts littoraux et alluviaux de la Belgique, 1908 – Essay on phytogeography of the littoral and alluvial districts of Belgium.
- Esquisse de la géographie botanique de la Belgique, 1910 – Outline of Belgian phytogeography.
- Nos arbres, 1911 – Our trees.
