= Bjarne Henning-Jensen =

Danish film director (1908–1995)

- Born: 6 October 1908; Copenhagen, Denmark
- Died: 21 February 1995 (aged 86); Denmark
- Occupations: Film director Screenwriter
- Years active: 1941–1974

Bjarne Henning-Jensen (6 October 1908 – 21 February 1995) was a Danish film director and screenwriter. He directed 21 films between 1941 and 1974. He was born in Copenhagen, Denmark and died in Denmark. He was married to Astrid Henning-Jensen.

== Filmography ==
- Cykledrengene i Tørvegraven (1941)
- Brunkul (1941)
- Arbejdet kalder (1941)
- Sukker (1942)
- Papir (1942)
- S.O.S. - kindtand (1943)
- Korn (1943)
- Heste (1943)
- Naar man kun er ung (1943)
- De danske sydhavsøer (1944)
- Folketingsvalg (1945)
- Ditte, Child of Man (1946)
- Stemning i april (1947)
- De pokkers unger (1947)
- Kristinus Bergman (1948)
- Vesterhavsdrenge (1950)
- Solstik (1953)
- Ballettens børn (1954)
- Hvor bjergene sejler (1955)
- Paw (1959)
- Kort är sommaren (1962)
- Skipper & Co. (1974)
