= Richard Müller-Freienfels =

German philosopher, psychologist and social critic

Richard Müller-Freienfels (1882–1949) was a German philosopher, psychologist and social critic. He was "one of the most important mediators of empirical psychology" to poetics.

== Life ==
Müller-Freienfels was born in Bad Ems on 7 August 1882. He was a lecturer and writer at the Berlin Trade School (Handelsschule Berlin). Müller-Freienfels joined the Nazi Party in 1933. He died on 12 December 1949 in Weilburg.

== Works ==
- Psychologie der Kunst: eine Darstellung der Grundzüge, 1912
- Poetik [Poetics], 1914
- Persönlichkeit und weltanschauung: die psychologischen grundtypen in religion, kunst und philosophie, 1919
- Philosophie der individualität, 1921
- Psychologie des deutschen Menschen und seiner Kultur : ein volkscharakterologischer Versuch, 1922. Translated by Rolf Hoffmann as The German, his psychology and culture: an inquiry into folk character, 1936.
- Die Seele des Alltags : eine Psychologie für Jedermann, 1925.
- Geheimnisse der Seele, 1927. Translated by Bernard Miall as Mysteries of the Soul, 1929
- Die Hauptrichtungen der gegenwärtigen Psychologie, 1929. Translated by W. Béran Wolf as The evolution of modern psychology, 1935.
