= Martin Andersen Nexø =

Danish writer (1869–1954)

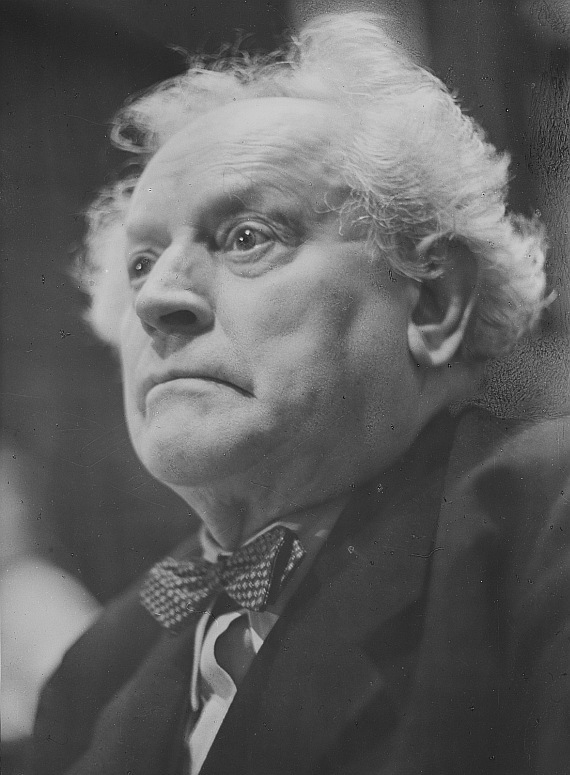
- Nexø in the 1950s
- Born: 26 June 1869; Copenhagen, Denmark
- Died: 1 June 1954 (aged 84); Dresden, East Germany
- Occupation: Writer

Signature
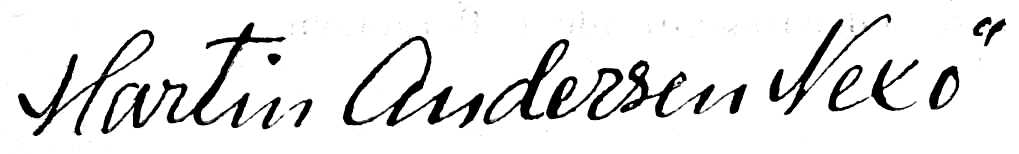

Martin Andersen Nexø (26 June 1869 – 1 June 1954) was a Danish writer. He was one of the authors in the Modern Breakthrough movement. More precisely, he was part of "Det Folkelige Gennembrud" (transl. the popular breakthrough) of the 1890s–1920s, a movement dominated by writers from a shallow social background in Danish art and literature.

Nexø was a socialist throughout his life. During the Second World War, he moved to the Soviet Union, and afterwards to Dresden in East Germany. However, Nexø was never a doctrinate Marxist; his perspective was primarily driven by social outrage combined with humanism and even religious idealism.

== Biography ==
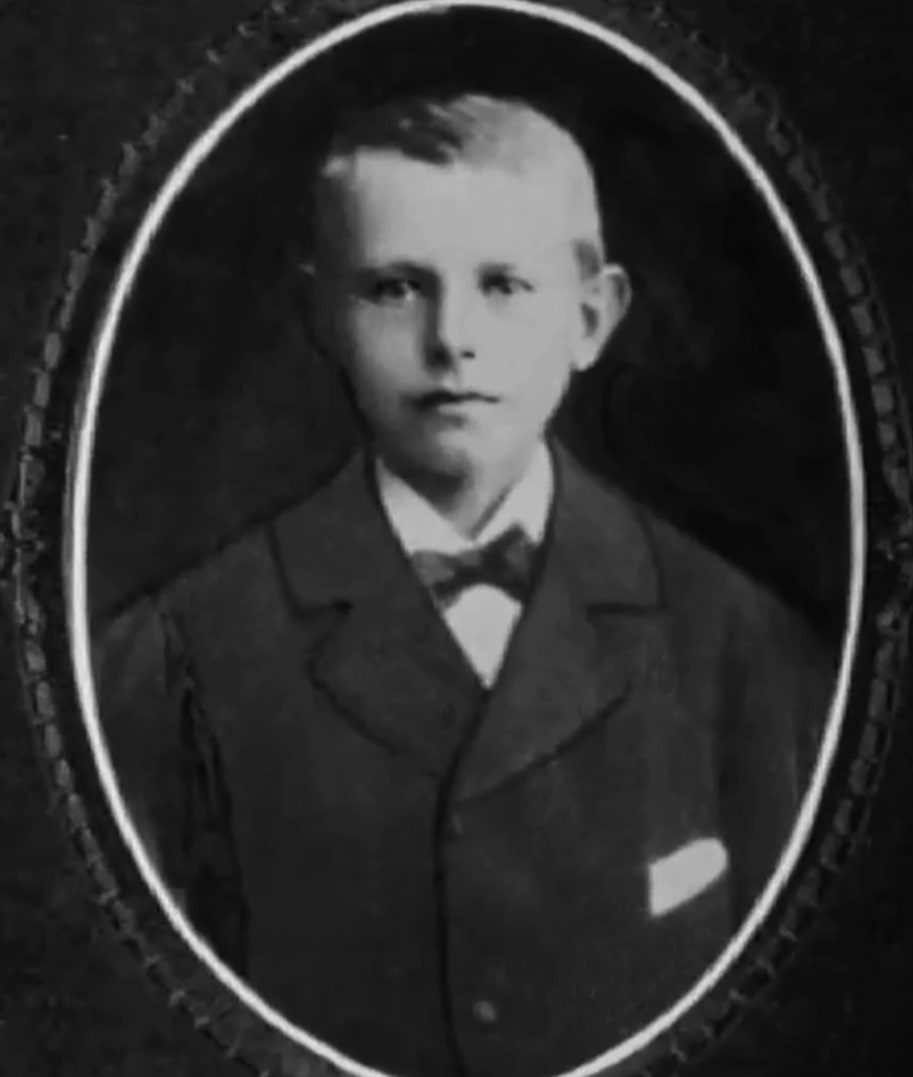
Martin Andersen as a child

Martin Andersen Nexø was born into a large family (the fourth of eleven children) in Christianshavn, at the time an impoverished district of Copenhagen. In 1877 his family moved to Nexø on Bornholm, and he adopted the name of this town as his last name. Having been an industrial worker before, in Nexø he attended a folk high school, and later worked as a journalist. He spent the mid-1890s travelling in Southern Europe, and his book Soldage (1903) (English: Days in the Sun) is largely based on those travels. Like many of his literary contemporaries, including Johannes Vilhelm Jensen, Nexø was at first heavily influenced by fin-de-siècle pessimism, but gradually turned to a more extroverted view, joining the Social Democratic movement and later the Communist Party of Denmark; his later books reflect his political support of the Soviet Union.

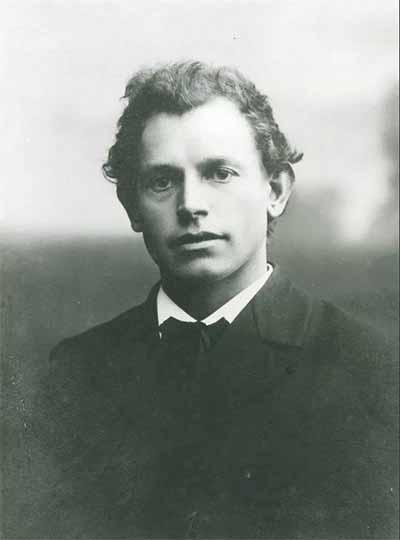
Martin Andersen Nexø in his youth, c. 1900s

Pelle Erobreren (English: Pelle the Conqueror), published in four volumes 1906–1910, is his best-known work and the one most translated. Its first section was made the subject of the DDR-FS movie Pelle der Eroberer in 1986 and the movie Pelle Erobreren in 1987. Ditte Menneskebarn (English: Ditte, Child of Man), written from 1917 to 1921, praises the working woman for her self-sacrifice; a Danish film version of the first part of the book was released in 1946 as Ditte, Child of Man. The much-debated Midt i en Jærntid (i.e. "In an Iron Age", English: In God's Land), written in 1929, satirises the Danish farmers of World War I. During his latter years, 1944 to 1956, Nexø wrote but did not complete a trilogy consisting of the books Morten hin Røde (English: Morten the Red), Den fortabte generation (English: The Lost Generation), and Jeanette. This was ostensibly a continuation of Pelle the Conqueror, but also a masked autobiography. Nexø also wrote many shorts stories depicting social conditions in rural Bornholm and industrial Copenhagen.

In 1941, during Denmark's occupation by Germany, Danish police arrested Nexø due to his communist affiliation. Upon his release he travelled to neutral Sweden and then to the Soviet Union, where he made broadcasts to Nazi-occupied Denmark and Norway. After World War II, Nexø moved to Dresden in East Germany, where he was made an honorary citizen. The Martin-Andersen-Nexø-Gymnasium high school in Dresden was named after him. His international reputation as one of the greatest European social writers grew, especially, but not exclusively, in socialist countries.

Nexø died in Dresden in 1954 and was interred in the Assistens Kirkegård in the Nørrebro neighbourhood of Copenhagen. A minor planet, 3535 Ditte, discovered by Soviet astronomer Nikolai Stepanovich Chernykh in 1979, is named after the main character in his novel Ditte, Child of Man. Martin Andersen Nexø's home in Nexø has become a museum in his memory. As per Danish copyright law, his works entered the public domain on 1 January 2025, 70 full calendar years after his death in 1954.

== Honours and awards ==
In 1949, Nexø received an honorary doctorate from the University of Greifswald's Faculty of Arts.

== Nexø's works in English ==
- Ditte: Towards The Stars. Translated by Asta & Rowland Kenney. New York: H. Holt. 1922.
- Days in the Sun. Translated by Jacob Wittmer Hartmann. 1929. (travel book)
- In God's Land. Translated by Thomas Seltzer. 1933.
- Under the Open Sky. My early Years. Translated by J. B. C. Watkins. 1938. (part of an autobiography)
- Pelle the Conqueror 1–2. Translated by Jesse Muir and Bernard Miall. Gloucester, Mass. 1963.
- Ditte. Gloucester, Mass. 1963.
- Pelle the Conqueror. Volume 1: Childhood. Translated by Steven T. Murray. Seattle, WA. New translation from Fjord Press. 1989.
- Pelle the Conqueror. Volume 2: Apprenticeship. Translated by Steven T. Murray & Tiina Nunnally. Seattle, WA. New translation from Fjord Press. 1991.

== Film ==
- 1946: Ditte, Child of Man – directed by : Bjarne Henning-Jensen
- 1958: Der Lotterieschwede – directed by : Joachim Kunert
- 1985: Pelle der Eroberer (TV series) – directed by : Christian Steinke
- 1987: Pelle the Conqueror – directed by : Bille August
- 1993: Dockpojken – directed by : Hilda Hellwigs

== Literature ==
- Haugan, Jørgen. Alt er som bekendt erotik: En biografi om Martin Andersen Nexø. København: Gad, 1998. ISBN 87-12-03291-3
- Ingwersen, Faith & Ingwersen, Niels: Quests for a Promised Land: The Works of Martin Andersen Nexø. 1984. ISBN 0-313-24469-3.
- Yde, Henrik: Det grundtvigske i Martin Andersen Nexøs liv I–II. ('The Grundtvig'ian in the life of Martin Andersen Nexø.' Doctor's thesis, 1991.) ISBN 87-7456-405-6.
- Yde, Henrik: Martin Andersen Nexø. An Introduction. (in Nordica, vol. 11. 1994).
