= Alfred Bertrand =

Belgian footballer

Personal information
- Date of birth: 6 December 1919
- Date of death: 22 November 1986 (aged 66)
- Position: Forward

International career
Years	Team	Apps	(Gls)
1948	Belgium	1	(0)

Alfred Bertrand (6 December 1919 – 22 November 1986) was a Belgian footballer. He played in one match for the Belgium national football team in 1948.
