= Ditte, Child of Man =

Ditte Menneskebarn
- Front cover of the Danish DVD for Ditte Menneskebarn
- Directed by: Bjarne Henning-Jensen; Jon Iversen
- Written by: Bjarne Henning-Jensen
- Based on: Ditte, Child of Man by Martin Andersen Nexø
- Produced by: Erik Balling
- Starring: Tove Maës
- Cinematography: Verner Jensen
- Edited by: Edla Hansen
- Music by: Herman D. Koppel; Poul Schierbeck
- Distributed by: Nordisk Film
- Release date: 20 December 1946
- Running time: 104 min.
- Country: Denmark
- Language: Danish

Ditte, Child of Man (Danish: Ditte Menneskebarn) is a 1946 socio-realistic Danish drama directed by Bjarne Henning-Jensen based on the novel by Martin Andersen Nexø. The film stars Tove Maës in the tragic story of an impoverished young girl who becomes the victim of harsh social conditions. The film has been noted as the first example of the more realistic and serious Danish film in the post-World War II era. Ditte, Child of Man is one of the ten films listed in Denmark's cultural canon by the Danish Ministry of Culture.

== Story ==
Ditte (Tove Maës), born illegitimately, is deserted as a young girl by her alcoholic mother Sørine (Karen Lykkehus). She moves in with her grandparents Maren (Karen Poulsen) and Søren Mand (Rasmus Ottesen). But after Søren dies, it is Ditte who becomes the old woman's only support. It is the small girl's deepest sorrow that she has no father, so she is pleased when she hears that Lars Peter (Edwin Tiemroth) will marry her mother and they will all live together. However, it is Ditte who becomes like a mother to Lars Peter's three small children. Their poverty is so oppressive, it drives Ditte's mother to kill Maren, and Sørine is sent away to prison. Ditte, despite her young age, must assume all of the household's responsibilities. As time passes, a warm relationship develops between Ditte and Lars Peter. One day, Lars Peter's brother Johannes (Ebbe Rode) appears. Johannes is a poor knife and scissors sharpener who informs them of his big business schemes, however, his schemes bring nothing but disappointment. Lars moves away and Ditte must find herself a job. Ditte takes a job as a servant on a rural farm. The farm owner's weak-willed son Karl (Preben Neergard), who is completely controlled by his mother (Maria Garland), falls in love with Ditte and they develop a happy romance. However, when Ditte becomes pregnant, Karl does nothing while his mother forces Ditte to leave the farm. Deeply distraught, Ditte searches after Lars Peter, the only parental figure who ever showed her kindness and understanding. Ditte discovers her mother has been paroled from prison and Ditte begins a new life—forgiving and caring for her mother—at the same time that she becomes the mother of her own illegitimate child.

== Cast ==
- Tove Maës as Ditte
- Karen Poulsen as the Grandmother
- Rasmus Ottesen as the Grandfather
- Karen Lykkehus as Ditte's Mother
- Jette Kehlet as Ditte when she was a girl
- Edvin Tiemroth as Lars Peter
- Kai Holm as Innkeeper
- Maria Garland as Karl's Mother
- Preben Neergaard as Karl
- Henny Lindorff Buckhøj as Sine the maid
- Ebbe Langberg as Christian Ditte's brother
- Lars Henning-Jensen as Paul Ditte's brother
- Hanne Juhl as Ditte's sister
- Per Buckhøj as Head Clerk
- Valsø Holm as Johansen the dayworker

== Reception ==
Danish film historian Ib Monty wrote that Ditte, Child of Man, in its harsh portrayal of social conditions was the first example of the realistic serious Danish film. It followed the growing trend in contemporary European cinema during the post-war period after World War II. Monty wrote that the film "was a tremendous success in Denmark and it also won a certain international recognition." However, film reviewers in the United States (where the movie was seen in an edited version which removed any nudity) dismissed the movie as being too broad and melodramatic. Maes in a later interview replied that people there hadn't yet been confronted with poverty in such a realistic portrayal.
