= List of Danish films of the 1940s =

The following table is a list of films produced in Denmark or in the Danish language during the 1940s. For an alphabetical list of all Danish films currently on Wikipedia see Category:Danish films. For Danish films from other decades see the Cinema of Denmark box above.

| Danish Title | English Title | Director(s) | Cast | Genre | Notes |
|---|---|---|---|---|---|
1940
| Jeg har elsket og levet | | George Schnéevoigt | Erling Schroeder, Ellen Gottschalch | Family | |
| Sommerglæder | | Svend Methling | Rasmus Christiansen, Ellen Gottschalch | Family | |
| Familien Olsen | The Olsen Family | Lau Lauritzen Jr., Alice O'Fredericks | Osvald Helmuth, Maria Garland, Berthe Qvistgaard, Karl Gustav Ahlefeldt | Family | |
1941
| Alle går rundt og forelsker sig | | | | | |
| Gå med mig hjem | | | | | |
| En mand af betydning | | Emanuel Gregers | Osvald Helmuth, Sigrid Horne-Rasmussen | Family | |
| Tag til Rønneby Kro | | Jon Iversen, Alice O'Fredericks | Johannes Meyer, Bodil Kjer, Ib Schønberg | | |
| Tante Cramers Testamente | | Arne Weel | Mathilde Nielsen, Knud Almar | Family | |
| Thummelumsen | | Emanuel Gregers | Peter Malberg, Sigurd Langberg | Comedy | |
| Wienerbarnet | | | | | |
1942
| Afsporet | Derailed | Bodil Ipsen; Lau Lauritzen Jr. | Poul Reumert, Illona Wieselmann, Ebbe Rode, Johannes Meyer, Ib Schønberg | Film Noir, Thriller | First Danish Film Noir |
| En Pige med Pep | | Emanuel Gregers | Marguerite Viby, Sigfred Johansen | Family | |
| Ballade i Nyhavn | | | | | |
| Barnet | The Child | Benjamin Christensen | Agis Winding, Bjarne Forchhammer | Family | |
| Natekspressen P903 | | Svend Methling | Carl Alstrup, Inger Stender | Crime Drama | |
| Søren Søndervold | | Lau Lauritzen Jr. | Peter S. Andersen, Ebbe Rode | Comedy | |
| Ta' Briller På | | Arne Weel | Liva Weel, Hans Egede Budtz | Comedy | |
1943
| Vredens Dag | Day of Wrath | Carl Theodor Dreyer | Lisbeth Movin | Drama | Norwegian play adaption |
| En pige uden lige | | Ole Berggreen, Jon Iversen | Ellen Gottschalch, Peter Malberg | Family | |
| Som du vil ha' mig | | Johan Jacobsen | Ebbe Rode, Gunnar Lauring; Marguerite Viby | Family | |
| Moster fra Mols | | | Rasmus Christiansen, Marie Niedermann | Family | |
| Alt for karrieren | | Emanuel Gregers | Sigfred Johansen, Karen Lykkehus | Family | |
| Hans onsdagsveninde | His Girl Wednesday | Lau Lauritzen Jr., Alice O'Fredericks | Peter Malberg, Karl Gustav Ahlefeldt | Comedy | |
1944
| Mordets Melodi | The Melody of Murder | Bodil Ipsen | Gull-Maj Norin, Poul Reichhardt | Crime; Film Noir | |
| Besættelse | Possession | Bodil Ipsen | Berthe Qvistgaard, Johannes Meyer, Aage Fønss, Poul Reichhardt | Film noir Crime | |
| Elly Petersen | Elly Petersen | Jon Iversen, Alice O'Fredericks | Bodil Kjer, Poul Reichhardt | Drama | |
| Familien Gelinde | | | | | |
| Teatertosset | Theater Crazy | Alice O'Fredericks | Marguerite Viby, Hans Kurt | Musical | |
1945
| De røde enge | The Red Meadows | Bodil Ipsen; Lau Lauritzen Jr. | Poul Reichhardt, Lisbeth Movin | Drama | won Palme d'Or at Cannes Film Festival |
| Den unsynlige hær | The Invisible Army | Johan Jakobsen | Bodil Kjer, Ebbe Rode, Mogens Wieth | Drama | |
| Man elsker kun een gang | One Only Loves Once | | | | |
| Panik i familien | Panic in the Family | Alice O'Fredericks; Lau Lauritzen Jr. | Ib Schønberg, Christian Arhoff, Lily Broberg | | |
1946
| Så mødes vi hos Tove | We Meet at Tove's | Alice O'Fredericks, Grete Frische | Illona Weiselmann, Clara Østø; Inger Stender, Grethe Holmer | Drama | |
| Ditte Menneskebarn | Ditte, Child of Man | Bjarne Jensen-Henning | Tove Maës; Karen Lykkehus | Tragedy | based on the Martin Andersen Nexø novel |
| Hans store aften | His Big Night | Svend Rindom | Sigfred Johansen, Lis Løwert | Family | |
| Op med lille Martha | | Asbjørn Andersen | Karl Gustav Ahlefeldt, Lily Broberg; Else Colber | Comedy | |
1947
| Familien Swedenhielm | The Swedenhielm Family | Lau Lauritzen | Poul Reumert, Ebbe Rode, Beatrice Bonnesen | Comedy | |
| Soldaten og Jenny | Jenny and the Soldier | Johan Jacobsen | Poul Reichhardt, Bodil Kjer | Romance Drama | Bodil Award for Best Danish Film |
| Stjerneskud | Meteor | Alice O'Fredericks, Jon Iversen | Dirch Passer | Comedy | Debut of Dirch Passer |
| Når katten er ude | When the Cat's Away | Lau Lauritzen Jr, Alice O'Fredericks | Karl Gustav Ahlefeldt, Svend Asmussen | Family | |
1948
| De nåede færgen | They Caught the Ferry | Carl Theodor Dreyer | Joseph Koch | Short, Horror, Drama | |
| Hvor er far? | | | | | |
| Penge som græs | | | | | |
| Tre år efter | | Johan Jacobsen | Angelo Bruun, Ib Schønberg | War Drama | Story by Carl Erik Soya |
| Støt står den danske sømand | The Viking Watch of the Danish Seaman | Bodil Ipsen; Lau Lauritzen Jr. | Poul Reichhardt, Lisbeth Movin | War Drama | Bodil Award for Best Danish Film |
1949
| Lejlighed til leje | | | | | |
| Susanne | Susanne | Torben Anton Svendsen | Rasmus Christiansen, Ellen Gottschalch | Family | Bodil Award for Best Danish Film |
