= List of Danish films of the 1950s =

The following table is a list of films produced in Denmark or in the Danish language during the 1950s. For an alphabetical list of all Danish films currently on Wikipedia see Category:Danish films. For Danish films from other decades see the Cinema of Denmark box above.

Danish Title	English Title	Director(s)	Cast	Genre	Notes
1950
De Røde Heste	The Red Horses	Alice O'Fredericks; Jon Iversen	Poul Reichhardt Tove Maës	Romance	Based on the Morten Korch novel
Café Paradis	Cafe Paradise	Bodil Ipsen, Lau Lauritzen Jr.	Poul Reichhardt, Ingeborg Brams, Ib Schønberg	Drama	Bodil Award for Best Danish Film (1951)
I gabestokken		Jon Iversen, Alice O'Fredericks	Ove Rud, Grethe Thordahl	Family	
Smedestræde 4		Arne Weel	Ib Conradi, Ebba Nørager, Liva Weel	Crime	
Din fortid er glemt	Your Past is Forgotten	Charles Thamæs	Bodil Kjer, Ebbe Rode, Gunnar Lauring, Ib Schønberg, Preben Lerdorff Rye	Drama	
1951
Mød mig på Cassiopeia	Meet Me on Cassiopeia	Torben Anton Svendsen	Bodil Kjer, Lily Broberg, Hans Kurt; Poul Reichhardt, Ellen Gottschalch; Johannes Meyer, Ib Schønberg	Romantic comedy	
Fodboldpræsten	The Football Priest	Alice O'Fredericks	Jørgen Reenberg, Grethe Thordahl, Ib Schønberg, Inger Stender	Family	
Fra den gamle købmandsgård		Svend Methling, Annelise Reenberg	Sigrid Neiiendam, Svend Methling, William Rosenberg, Astrid Villaume	Romance Drama	
Nålen		Johan Jacobsen	Ebbe Rode, Tove Maës	Crime	
Det sande ansigt	The True Face	Bodil Ipsen; Lau Lauritzen Jr.	Lau Lauritzen Jr., Johannes Meyer, Lisbeth Movin, Ib Schønberg	Drama	Bodil Award for Best Danish Film (1952)
Frihed forpligter		Alice O'Fredericks, Robert Saaskin	Inger Stender, Helga Fier	War Drama	
Alt dette og Island med		Johan Jacobsen, Erik Faustmann	Sonja Wigert, Poul Reichhardt, Karl Gustav Ahlefeldt, Asbjørn Andersen	Drama	
1953
Adam og Eva	Adam and Eve	Erik Balling	Louis Miehe-Renard, Sonja Jensen	Comedy	Bodil Award for Best Danish Film (1953)
Farlig ungdom	Dangerous Youth	Lau Lauritzen Jr.	Ib Mosin, Birgitte Bruun	Crime	Bodil Award for Best Danish Film (1954)
Far til Fire	Father of Four	Alice O'Fredericks	Ib Schønberg, Birgitte Bruun	Family; Comedy	
1954
Jan går til filmen		Torben Anton Svendsen	Henrik Huld, Ib Lundtoft, Mimi Heinrich	Family	
1955
Blændværk	Delusion	Johan Jacobsen	Mimi Heinrich, Henrik Wiehe	Crime	
Ordet	The Word	Carl Theodor Dreyer	Emil Hass Christensen, Birgitte Federspiel	Drama	Bodil Award for Best Danish Film (1955)
På tro og love		Torben Anton Svendsen	Poul Reichhardt Astrid Villaume	Romance	Bodil Award for Best Danish Film (1956)
1956
Kispus	Kispus	Erik Balling	Helle Virkner; Henning Moritzen	Romantic comedy	First Danish feature film in color
Qivitoq	Qivitoq	Erik Balling	Poul Reichhardt; Astrid Villaume	Romance Drama	Filmed on location in Greenland. Entered into the 1957 Cannes Film Festival.
1957
Ingen tid til kærtegn	Be Dear to Me	Annelise Hovmand	Lily Weiding Hans Kurt	Family	Bodil Award for Best Danish Film (1957), Entered into Berlin
Tag til marked i Fjordby		Poul Bang	Dirch Passer, Ove Sprogøe, Buster Larsen, Lily Broberg	Comedy	
Bundfald	Sin Alley	Palle Kjærulff-Schmidt; Robert Sasskin	Birgitte Bruun, Ib Mossin, Ghita Nørby	Crime	Bodil Award for Best Danish Film (1958)
1958
Styrmand Karlsen		Annelise Reenberg	Johannes Meyer, Otto Brandenburg, Frits Helmuth, Dirch Passer, Ove Sprogøe, Ghita Norby	Family	
Det lille hotel	The Little Hotel	Jon Iversen	Helge Kjærulff-Schmidt, Lisbeth Movin, Ebbe Langberg	Family	
Mariannes bryllup	Marianne's Wedding	Peer Guldbrandsen	Henning Moritzen, Astrid Villaume, Birgitte Bruun	Drama	
Ung kærlighed		André Rodriguez	Suzanne Bech, Klaus Pagh, Annie Birgit Garde	Romance	
Soldaterkammerater	Soldier Buddies	Sven Methling	Paul Hagen, Vera Stricker	Comedy	
Guld og grønne skove	The Girls Are Willing	Gabriel Axel			Entered into the 8th Berlin International Film Festival
1959
En fremmed banker på		Johan Jacobsen	Birgitte Federspiel Preben Lerdorff Rye; Victor Montell	Crime Drama	Bodil Award for Best Danish Film (1959)
Vi er allesammen tossede		Sven Methling	Kjeld Petersen, Jessie Rindom; Birgitte Reimer, Buster Larsen; Dirch Passer	Comedy	Bodil Award for Best Danish Film (1960)
Far til fire på Bornholm	Father of Four on Bornholm	Alice O'Fredericks; Robert Saaskin	Karl Stegger, Else Hvidhøj; Otto Møller Jensen, Ole Neumann	Family	
Paw		Astrid Henning-Jensen	Edvin Adolphson		Entered into the 1960 Cannes Film Festival
Poeten og Lillemor	The Poet and the Little Mother	Erik Balling			Entered into the 9th Berlin International Film Festival
