= Ingeborg Skov =

Danish actress

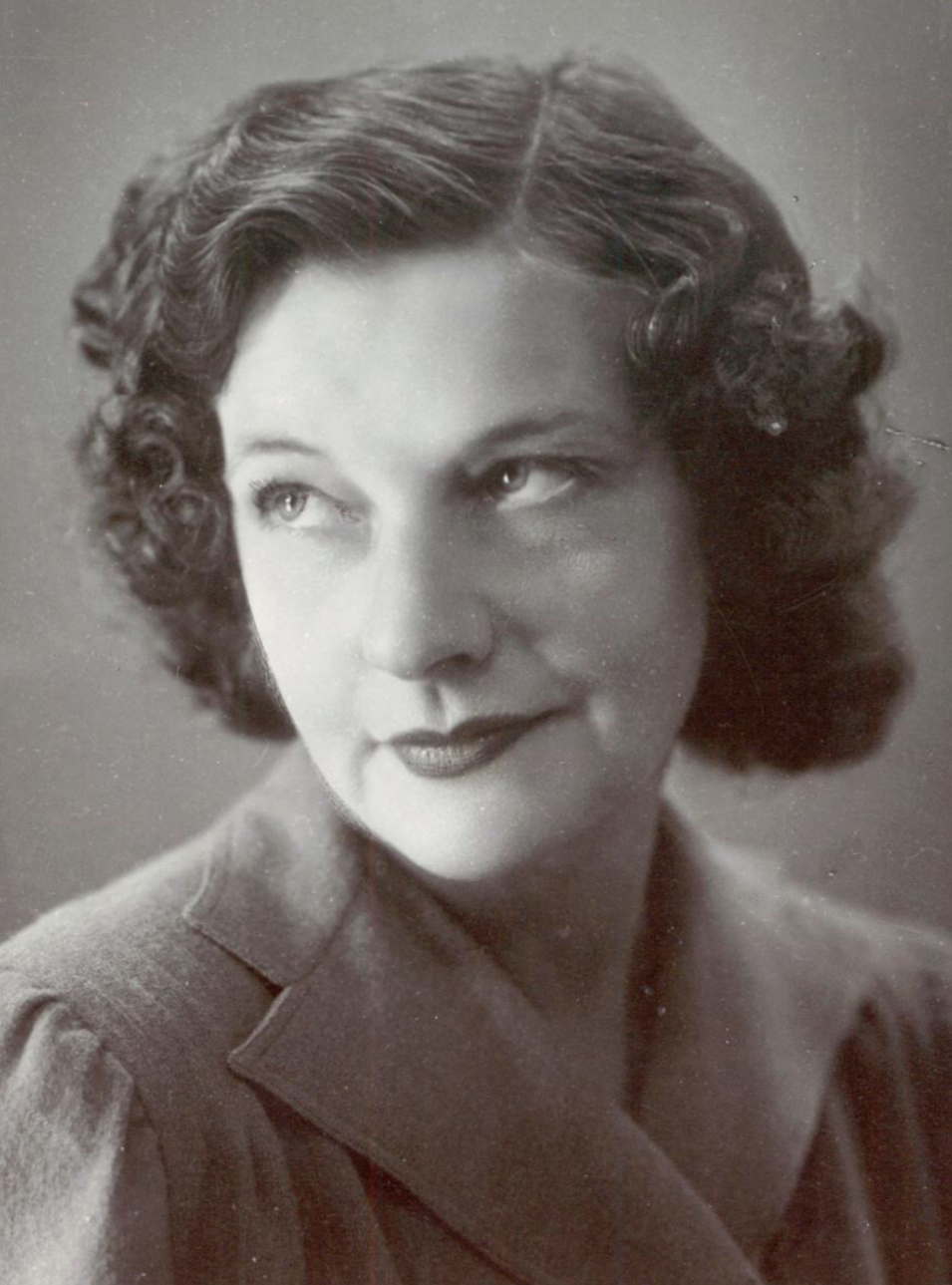
- Born: Ingeborg Cathrine Caroline Skov; 22 February 1893; Copenhagen, Denmark
- Died: 5 February 1990 (aged 96); Copenhagen, Denmark
- Occupation: Actress
- Years active: 1914 — 1963
- Parent(s): Nis Hansen Skov, Agnes Augusta Ambrosen

Ingeborg Cathrine Caroline Skov (1893–1990) was a Danish actress who performed on stage as well as in a number of films. After training at Copenhagen's Dagmar Theatre, she made her stage debut there in 1911 while her first movie appearance was in 1914 in the silent film Elskovsbarnet. After marrying the theatre director Carl Thorvald Larsen in 1930, she performed a wide variety of key roles, first at the Odense Theatre until 1935 and thereafter at Copenhagen's Folketeatret until 1959. After her husband retired, she ran the Alexandra Cinema in Copenhagen.

== Early life and education ==
Born in Copenhagen on 22 February 1893, Ingeborg Cathrine Caroline Skov was the daughter of the auctioneer Nis Hansen Skov (1853–1904) and Agnes Augusta Ambrosen (1859–1904). After her marriage with the lawyer Aage Lassen Landorph (1891–1941), in October 1930, she married the theatre director Carl Thorvald Larsen (1892–1992).

She was trained as an actress by Peter Jerndorff and Betty Hennings and took dancing lessons under Emilie Walbom. She completed her training as a pupil at the Dagmar Theatre School.

== Career ==
Skov made her debut at Copenhagen's Dagmar Theatre in 1911 as Louison in Molière's Den Indbildt Syge. From 1914, she performed at the Alexandra Theatre and toured in Sweden and Norway. After her first marriage, she took a break from the stage for a few years. From 1925, she performed in various provincial drama companies under directors Ove Bassøe, Gerda Christophersen and Otto Jacobsen. In 1925, she joined the company directed by her future husband Thorvald Larsen. From 1927 to 1935, she moved with him to the Odense Theatre. Here she performed some 60 roles in varying genres. Among the most memorable were Agnete in Elverhøj, Emmy in Nøddebo Præstergård and Puck in Shakespeare's En Skærsommernatsdrøm. Her most notable performance was in the farce Mrs. Dot in which she appeared with Bodil Ipsen.

In 1935 the couple moved to Copenhagen's Folketeatret where she was less active but stood in for those who were sick. She performed in a number of Danish plays including Frøkenklostret, Moderhjertet, Den gale fra Chaillot, Kvinder på hotel and Fra bord til bord. She also appeared at Det Ny Teater and Allé-Scenen. When her husband ceased to work as a theatre director in 1959, she retired from the stage and ran the Alexandra Cinema in Copenhagen.

Ingeborg Skov died on 5 February 1990, aged 96.

== Filmography ==
Year	Title	Role	Director	Notes
1914	Statens kurer	Bertha	Einar Zangenberg	Silent film
1915	Det evige had	Asta	Hjalmar Davidsen	Silent film
1916	En Forbryders Liv og Levned	Elsie		Silent film
1917	Fru Kristina	Jeanne		Silent film
1954	Arvingen	Charlotte	Alice O'Fredericks	
1958	Krudt og klunker	Mrs. Sartorius	Annelise Hovmand	
1950	Helle for Helene	de Witt	Gabriel Axel	
1963	Hvis lille pige er du?	Mrs. Thurøe	Erik Balling	
