= The Little Match Girl (disambiguation) =

The Little Match Girl is a literary fairy tale by Hans Christian Andersen.

The Little Match Girl may also refer to:

- The Little Match Girl (1928 film), a French drama film, based on the short story
- The Little Match Girl (1937 film), an animated short film, based on the short story
- The Little Match Girl (1953 film), a Danish short adventure film, based on the short story
- The Little Match Girl (1987 film), an American television film, based on the short story
- The Little Matchgirl (2006 film), a Disney animated short tragedy film, based on the short story
- The Little Match Girl (Pinkney book), a 1999 book by Jerry Pinkney, based on the short story

== See also ==
- The Little Match Seller, a 1902 British short silent drama film
