= Erik Holmey =

Danish actor

- Born: 25 February 1942 (age 83); Frederiksberg, Denmark
- Years active: 1972–present

Erik Holmey (born 25 February 1942) is a Danish actor. He has performed on stage with the Royal Danish Theatre and in a number of film and TV productions.

== Career ==
Holmey made his screen debut in Erik Balling's comedy Takt og tone i himmelsengen (1972), and reached an international audience as a regular in Dino De Laurentiis' series of Robert E. Howard-films, starting with John Milius' Conan the Barbarian (1982), where his many roles include the Turanian War Officer who is asked "What is best in life?", and replies: "The open steppe, fleet horse, falcons at your wrist, and the wind in your hair!"

Erik Holmey's starring roles include the vampire lord Rico Mortiz in Shaky González's action-horror film Nattens engel (1998), playing opposite Ulrich Thomsen and Mads Mikkelsen. This was the first of his frequent appearances in the films of director Shaky Gonzalez, followed by such roles as The Devil in the horror comedy One Hell of a Christmas (2002), crime lord Frank Lowies in the urban western Pistoleros (2007) and seasoned police negotiator Frank Toft in the upcoming heist movie Det grå guld (2010).

Holmey's stage career includes a season as an actor at the Royal Danish Theatre in 1973–1974, as well as roles at Det ny Teater. He has worked as a dancer at Joker-Teatret, Det Danske Balletakademi, and on TV.

In 1979 and 1980 Erik Holmey won the Danish middleweight bodybuilding championship, and in 1981 he became Danish heavyweight bodybuilding champion.

== Filmography ==
Film
Year	Title	Role	Notes
1972	Takt og tone i himmelsengen	Ung mand til hest	
1978	Fængslende feriedage	Araber #1	
1982	Conan the Barbarian	Turanian War Officer	
1984	Tukuma	Bruno	
1984	Conan the Destroyer	Henchman of Queen Taramis	Uncredited
1985	Red Sonja	Warrior	Uncredited
1985	Elise	Officer	
1985	Walter og Carlo - op på fars hat	Don Miquels håndlanger	
1986	Oviri		
1986	Mord i mørket	Gangster #2	
1997	Smilla's Sense of Snow	Hansen	
1998	Albert	Vagt 2	
1998	Nattens engel	Rico	
1999	I Kina spiser de hunde	Vagt 2 (Guard 2)	
2002	One Hell of a Christmas	The Devil	
2002	Old Men in New Cars	Lufthavns vagt	
2006	Tempelriddernes skat	Tempelridder	Uncredited
2007	Pistoleros	Frank Lowies	
2007	Hjemve		
2008	Krokodillerne	Vagt #2	
2008	A Viking Saga: Son of Thor	Rurik	
2010	Westbrick Murders	William	
2011	The Last Demon Slayer	Horik Bloodaxe	
2012	Ud af mørket	Slagteren	
2013	Det grå guld	Frank Toft	
2015	Albert	Borgmester	Voice
2015	Statue Collector	Detective Malloy	
2017	Le Accelerator	The Dead	
2018	Det grå guld		(announced)
Television
Year	Title	Role	Notes
1981	Matador	Tysk Officer	1 episode
1992	Gøngehøvdingen	Dragon #2 / Svensker	3 episodes
1998	Taxa	Gangsteren / En Mand	2 episodes
2000	Rejseholdet	Bilforhandler	1 episode
