= Asta Hansen =

Danish actress (1914–1962)

- Born: 20 December 1914; Store Magleby, Denmark
- Died: 21 October 1962 (aged 47); Sundby, Denmark
- Occupation: Actress

Asta Hansen (20 December 1914 – 21 October 1962) was a Danish stage and film actress.

Asta Betty Hansen was born in Store Magleby to Grete Sofie (née Lundqvist) and Arthur Jørgen Hansen. She first acted in pantomimes and then in 1934 appeared at the Folketeatret, Copenhagen. She subsequently appeared in many revues and operettas but her career became less busy in the 1950s.

She was married to Gottfred Havsteen who was also her manager.

Hansen is buried at the Store Magleby Cemetery, on the island of Amager just south of Copenhagen.

== Filmography ==
- Sjette trækning - 1936
- Der var engang en vicevært - 1937
- Bolettes brudefærd (The Wedding of Bolette) - 1938, director Emanuel Gregers
- En mand af betydning - 1941
- Alle går rundt og forelsker sig - 1941
- Peter Andersen - 1941
- Alt for karrieren - 1943
- Erik Ejegods pilgrimsfærd - 1943
