= Sekstet =

- Film poster
- Directed by: Annelise Hovmand
- Written by: Poul Bach; Annelise Hovmand
- Produced by: Johan Jacobsen
- Starring: John Kelland
- Cinematography: Karl Andersson
- Release date: 1963
- Country: Denmark
- Language: Danish language

Sekstet is a 1963 Danish film directed by Annelise Hovmand. The film was selected as the Danish entry for the Best Foreign Language Film at the 37th Academy Awards, but was not accepted as a nominee.

== Cast ==
- John Kelland as Peter
- Ghita Nørby as Lena
- Axel Strøbye as Robert, Elaines man
- Ingrid Thulin as Elaine
- Hanne Ulrich as Rachel
- Ole Wegener as John

== See also ==
- List of submissions to the 37th Academy Awards for Best Foreign Language Film
- List of Danish submissions for the Academy Award for Best Foreign Language Film
