= Svend Poulsen =

Danish military commander

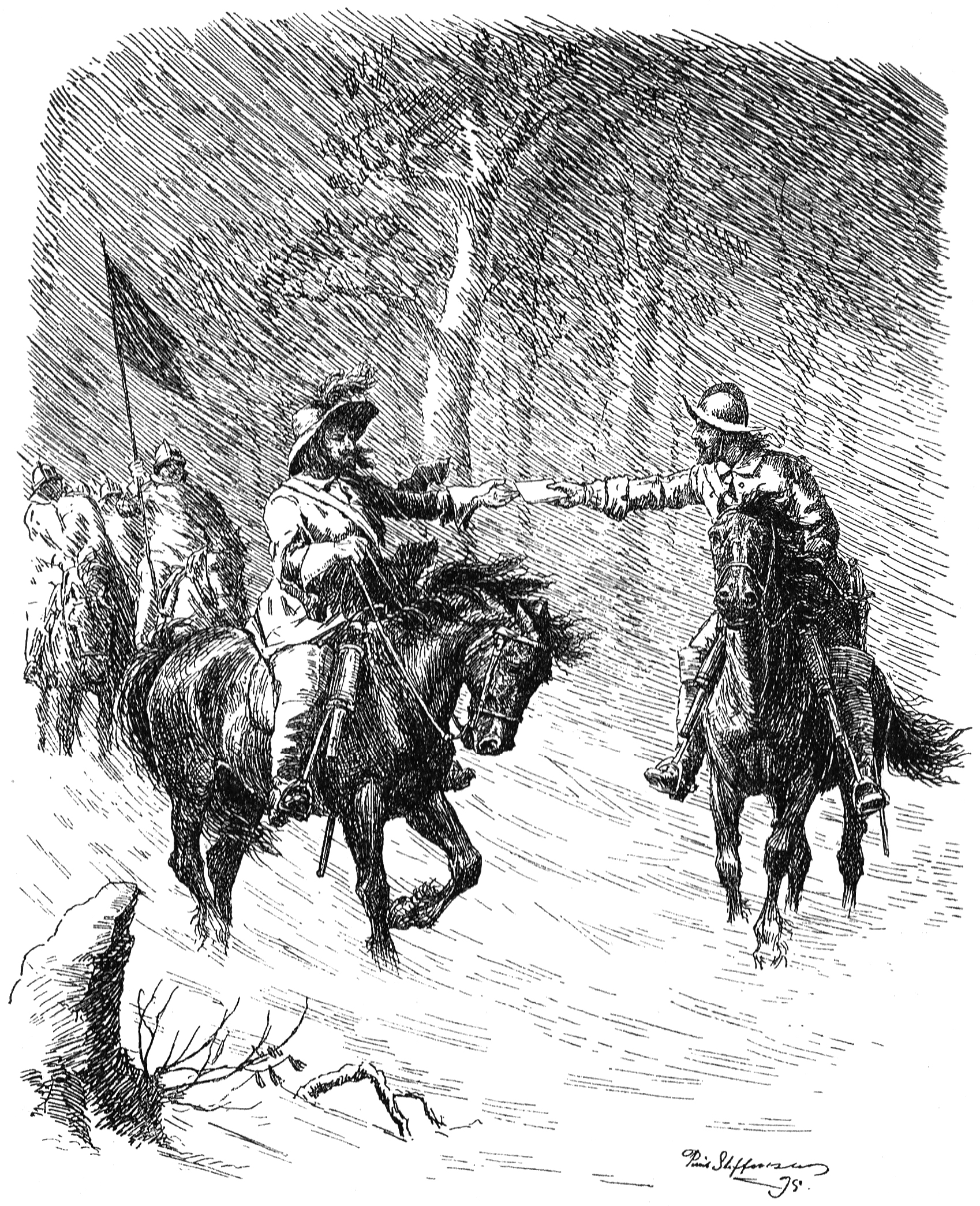
- Svend Poulsen Gønge (right), luring the Swedish colonel Sparre into an ambush while disguised as a Swede
- Born: c. 1610
- Died: c. 1680
- Military career
- Allegiance: Denmark-Norway
- Branch: Danish Army
- Service years: 1625-1660; 1675-1679
- Rank: Major
- Nickname: Gøngehøvdingen
- Conflicts: Torstenson War, Second Northern War, Scanian War

Svend Poulsen (c. 1610 – c. 1680), also referred to as Svend Poulsen Gønge (Swedish: Svend Gjönge Povlsen) was a Danish military commander in the 17th century, serving in the armies of Christian IV, Frederick III, and Christian V. He fought in the Torstenson War, Second Northern War, and the Scanian War, and led the snaphane militia in guerilla warfare against Sweden in occupied Zealand from 1658 to 1659. He was popularized under the name Gøngehøvdingen (English: the Gønge chieftain) in 1853, when his exploits were fictionalized under that name by Danish author Carit Etlar. The historicity of his aliases has since been disputed.

== Historical account ==
Little is known for certain about the youth of Svend Poulsen. He was probably born around 1610 in north-western Scania or southern Halland. He was a soldier in the army of Christian IV during the 1625-1629 Danish intervention in the Thirty Years' War, and also served in the Dutch Army. He was made an officer in the Danish army in the Torstenson War from 1643 to 1645. He was a citizen of Laholm in Halland, even after it came under Swedish reign in 1645. During the 1657–1658 Dano-Swedish War of the greater Second Northern War theatre, Poulsen commanded a company of dragoons in April 1657, in the defence of Ängelholm in Scania against Sweden. He took part in a number of skirmishes, and was promoted captain in December 1657. After the cession of Scania and Halland at the Treaty of Roskilde of 1658, Svend Poulsen and his dragoons moved to Zealand, where they were ordered to disband.

Poulsen led his dragoons once more at the outbreak of the 1658–1660 Dano-Swedish War, and integrated his company into the defence of Copenhagen. Poulsen himself was sent into occupied Zealand in order to organize a guerilla warfare resistance. On 22 August 1658 a decree ordered the peasants of Zealand to assist Poulsen in harassing the Swedish occupying forces. He assembled a company of snaphane militia within the month of August, though he lacked substantial support from the local populace. He led several successful charges against smaller Swedish contingents, but was finally forced to retreat. He returned to Copenhagen, and later rejoined the regular army. He was probably a part of the city defence during the Assault on Copenhagen in February 1659.

He left the army at the conclusion of the war in 1660, and was given the desolate Lundbygård manor at Præstø. The manor caused Poulsen financial hardships, and in 1666 he appealed for Frederick III to help him, and was in turn granted an additional manor. His financial situation did not improve. Poulsen had to abandon Lundbygård due to tax debts in 1673. He was granted a lifelong state pension that year, and settled in a smaller residence. He rejoined the army of Christian V for the Scanian War from 1675 to 1679, and first served on Stevns, before he was promoted to the rank of major and commanded a dragoon company in Scania. Some doubt has been cast on his status as major and exact role in the Scanian War. He died around 1680, an old man weakened by illness.

== Name ==
He was born Svend Poulsen around 1610. A 1673 protocol has the earliest reference to him as "Svend Poulsen Gynge", Gynge being the contemporary Danish name for the two Göinge (Danish: Gønge) hundreds in Scania. Danish historians in the 19th century, used the Gynge name to establish Svend Poulsen as hailing from Gønge and leading Gønge soldiers, both in Scania in 1657 and on Zealand in 1658. This made him known by the extended name of Svend Poulsen Gønge, as well as the fictional construction Gøngehøvdingen (English: the Gønge chieftain). In 1853, Danish author Carit Etlar published the novel Gjøngehøvdingen, a fictional account of Svend Poulsen's exploits as a snaphane during the 1658–1660 Dano-Swedish War. The book was hugely popular, and Gøngehøvdingen stuck as the prevailing alias for Svend Poulsen in Denmark.

It has since been argued, that Svend Poulsen wasn't necessarily linked to Gønge at all. In the 109 primary sources pertaining to Svend Poulsen, only three mention the Gynge/Göinge name; none of these three are written by Svend Poulsen himself. Likewise, the men in his 1657 dragoon company were from Halland and not Gønge. The 1658 snaphane company on Zealand were made up of locals and did not contain any Gønge people, who served the army elsewhere. The authors of the 19th century historical accounts of Svend Poulsen were also unclear on the historicity of their claims, rehashing each other's myths and fictions, while transforming Svend Poulsen into a Gønge leader. His only documented link to Gønge prior to 1673, seems to be fighting in Scania during the 1657–1658 Dano-Swedish War, near Gønge.

== In fiction ==
Carit Etlar's novels Gjøngehøvdingen and Dronningens Vagtmester (The Queen's Guard) popularized Svend Poulsen as a righteous and brave leader figure, and these novels have since been adapted into film, television, audio books, etc

Film adaptations of the Carit Etlar's novels:

- Gøngehøvdingen, 1909 film, directed by Carl Alstrup
- Göingehövdingen, 1953 film, played by Edvin Adolphson
- Gøngehøvdingen, 1961 film, played by Jens Østerholm
- Dronningens vagtmester, 1963 film, played by Jens Østerholm
- Gøngehøvdingen, 1990 musical, played by Kim Harris
- Gøngehøvdingen, 1992 TV series, played by Søren Pilmark

Additional Orla Klausen produced the graphic novel series Gøngehøvdingen of five albums from 1989 to 1993, published by Interpresse. In 1998, Nils Hartmann published the children's book Gøngehøvdingen.

Under the brand name EUROPA the novels were adapted into children's audio plays starring famous danish actors such as Poul Reichhard, who also played the leads best friend in the motion picture Dronningens Vagtmester from 1963.

In 2006 Sweden's national television SVT and Filmlance produced a mini-series entitled Snapphanar which takes place in the same period, location and utilizing the same themes, but not featuring Svend Poulsen og any of the characters from the danish novels by Carit Etlar.
