= Peter Andersen (film) =

1941 film

- Directed by: Svend Methling
- Written by: Holger Boëtius; Axel Østrup
- Produced by: Tage Nielsen
- Starring: Carl Alstrup
- Cinematography: Karl Andersson
- Edited by: Edith Schlüssel
- Release date: 8 December 1941
- Running time: 92 minutes
- Country: Denmark
- Language: Danish

Peter Andersen is a 1941 Danish family film directed by Svend Methling and starring Carl Alstrup.

== Cast ==
- Carl Alstrup - Peter Andersen
- Erika Voigt - Fru Ebba Andersen
- Poul Reichhardt - Harald Andersen
- Inger Lassen - Jenny Andersen
- Asta Hansen - Benna
- Gudrun Stephensen - Gertrud
- Edgar Hansen - Artist Ewald Madsen
- Victor Montell - Sagfører Sigurd Jonsen
- Ingrid Matthiessen - Hushjælpen Agda
- Marie Niedermann - Fru Rasmussen
- Aage Fønss - Grosserer Helge Appel
- Bjarne Forchhammer - Læge Jens Broby
- Sigurd Langberg - Direktør Andersen
- Anna Henriques-Nielsen - Rengøringskone
- Aage Redal
