= Dronningens vagtmester =

1963 film

- Directed by: Johan Jacobsen
- Written by: Carit Etlar; Annelise Hovmand
- Produced by: Annelise Hovmand; Johan Jacobsen
- Starring: Poul Reichhardt
- Cinematography: Marko Ya'acobi
- Edited by: Erik Aaes
- Release date: 29 March 1963
- Running time: 95 minutes
- Country: Denmark
- Language: Danish

Dronningens vagtmester is a 1963 Danish drama film based on the novel of the same name by Carit Etlar. It was directed by Johan Jacobsen and starring Poul Reichhardt. It followed the 1961 film Gøngehøvdingen.

== Cast ==
- Poul Reichhardt as Ib
- Jens Østerholm as Svend Gønge
- Birgitte Federspiel as Kulsoen
- Gunnar Lauring as Kaptajn Esner
- Ghita Nørby as Inger
- Vivi Bach as Adelsdatteren (as Vivi Bak)
- Karin Nellemose as Adelsfruen
- Ove Sprogøe as Tam
- Pauline Schumann as Dronning Sophie Amalie
- Poul Finn Poulsen as Palle
- Henrik Wiehe as Junker Rud
- Bent Vejlby as Jens Jerntrøje
- Svend Johansen as Svensk fenrik
- William Rosenberg as Dronningens 1. rytter
- Benny Juhlin as Olav, svensk dragon
- Jørgen Kiil as Rosenkrantz
- Willy Rathnov as En gønge
- Karen Berg as Mette Gyde
- Niels Dybeck as Sveriges fægtekonge
- Ole Wegener
- Per Wiking as Gønge
- William Kisum
- Erik Kühnau as Gønge
- Carl Nielsen
- Kurt Erik Nielsen
- Bjørn Spiro as Svensk soldat
- Alex Suhr
