= Gebuhr =

Gebuhr is a surname. Notable people with the surname include:

- Michael Gebühr (1942–2021), German archaeologist and prehistorian
- Otto Gebühr (1877–1954), German actor
- Vera Gebuhr (1916–2014), Danish actress
