= List of submissions to the 30th Academy Awards for Best Foreign Language Film =

1957 Best Foreign Language Film submissions

Highlights
- Oscar winner: (Italy) Nights of Cabiria
- Submissions: 12
- Debuts: 5

This is a list of submissions to the 30th Academy Awards for Best Foreign Language Film. The Academy Award for Best Foreign Language Film was created in 1956 by the Academy of Motion Picture Arts and Sciences to honour non-English-speaking films produced outside the United States. The award is handed out annually, and is accepted by the winning film's director, although it is considered an award for the submitting country as a whole. Countries are invited by the Academy to submit their best films for competition according to strict rules, with only one film being accepted from each country.

For the 30th Academy Awards, twelve films were submitted in the category Academy Award for Best Foreign Language Film. Documentary Torero, which represented Mexico, failed to get an Oscar nomination in the Foreign Language Film category, but was nominated for the Best Documentary Feature. Denmark's Annelise Hovmand became the first female director to have a film in the running at the submission stage. The five nominated films came from France, India, Italy, Norway and West Germany.

Italy won for the fifth time with Nights of Cabiria by Federico Fellini, marking the second year in a row he received the prize.

== Submissions ==
Submitting country	Film title used in nomination	Original title	Language(s)	Director(s)	Result
Denmark	No Time for Tenderness	Ingen tid til kærtegn	Danish	Annelise Hovmand	Not nominated
France	Gates of Paris	Porte des Lilas	French	René Clair	Nominated
West Germany	The Devil Strikes at Night	Nachts, wenn der Teufel kam	German	Robert Siodmak	Nominated
Greece	The Lagoon of Desire	Η λίμνη των πόθων	Greek	Giorgos Zervos	Not nominated
India	Mother India	भारत माता	Hindi	Mehboob Khan	Nominated
Italy	Nights of Cabiria	Le notti di Cabiria	Italian	Federico Fellini	Won Academy Award
Japan	Arakure	あらくれ	Japanese	Mikio Naruse	Not nominated
Mexico	Torero!	¡Torero!	Spanish	Carlos Velo	Not nominated
Norway	Nine Lives	Ni Liv	Norwegian	Arne Skouen	Nominated
Spain	High Street	Calle Mayor	Spanish	Juan Antonio Bardem	Not nominated
Sweden	The Seventh Seal	Det Sjunde inseglet	Swedish, Latin	Ingmar Bergman	Not nominated
Taiwan	Amina	阿美娜	Mandarin Chinese	Yuan Congmei	Not nominated

== Sources ==
- Margaret Herrick Library, Academy of Motion Picture Arts and Sciences
