= The Musketeers (film) =

1961 Danish film by Annelise Hovmand

Gøngehøvdingen
- Directed by: Annelise Hovmand
- Written by: Carit Etlar; Annelise Hovmand
- Produced by: Johan Jacobsen
- Starring: Jens Østerholm
- Cinematography: Henning Kristiansen; Aage Wiltrup
- Release date: 9 December 1961
- Running time: 111 minutes
- Country: Denmark
- Language: Danish

The Musketeers (Danish: Gøngehøvdingen) is a 1961 Danish family film directed by Annelise Hovmand and starring Jens Østerholm. It was followed by the 1963 film Dronningens vagtmester.

== Plot ==
The film is set in 1658, during the Dano-Swedish War (1658–1660). The winter is cold and harsh. The Swedish King Karl X Gustav, who has moved his army from Germany to occupy Jutland, can easily access Copenhagen. In South Zealand, the Danish Snapphane militiamen fight against the Swedish supremacy under the leadership of Svend Poulsen, who is called the Gønge-chieftain (Gøngehøvdingen, after the historical Danish shire of Gønge in Scania). Svend gets an unofficial assignment from King Frederik III to travel to Vordingborg Church to collect 50,000 Rigsdaler-coins and securities belonging to the King. Then these valuables must be brought from Vordingborg to Copenhagen to pay for Copenhagen's defense against the Swedes, where it is of great importance that they arrive in time. Svend gets help from his brother-in-law, Ib Abel. Together, Svend and Ib try to get through the Swedish lines covertly, but it is not so easy as they are hunted by a mad German captain and his witch.

== Cast ==
- Jens Østerholm as Svend Poulsen (Gøngehøvdingen)
- Dirch Passer as Ib
- Ove Sprogøe as Tam
- Birgitte Federspiel as Kulsoen
- Hans Kurt as Kaptajn Mannheimer
- Ghita Nørby as Inger
- Mogens Wieth as Frederik III
- Pauline Schumann as Dronning Sophie Amalie
- Asbjørn Andersen as Borgmester Nansen
- Georg Årlin as Colonel Sparre
- Bent Mejding as Tange
- Annegrethe Nissen as Ane Marie
- Anne Werner Thomsen as Julie Parsberg
- Jørn Jeppesen as Korporal Staal
- Keld Markuslund as Præsten Søren
