= Ellen Margrethe Stein =

Danish actress

- Born: 8 October 1893; Copenhagen, Denmark
- Died: 2 April 1979 (aged 85)
- Occupation: Actress
- Years active: 1933-1978

Ellen Margrethe Stein (8 October 1893 – 2 April 1979) was a Danish actress. She appeared in more than 45 films between 1933 and 1978.

== Selected filmography ==
- En fuldendt gentleman (1937)
- The Invisible Army (1945)
- Lucky Journey (1947)
- Dorte (1951)
- We Who Go the Kitchen Route (1953)
- Seksdagesløbet (1958)
- Svinedrengen og prinsessen på ærten (1962)
- The Girl and the Press Photographer (1963)
- Oh, to Be on the Bandwagon! (1972)
- Me and the Mafia (1973)
