= Erika Voigt =

Danish actress (1898–1952)

- Born: 28 November 1898; Randers
- Died: 29 May 1952 (aged 53); Copenhagen
- Years active: 1935 – 1951

Erika Voigt (28 November 1898 – 29 May 1952) was a Danish stage and film actress and singer.

Born in 1898, in Randers, Denmark, she began her early acting career at the age of 17 as a Revue actress. She would later go on to perform in many traditional Danish folk comedy films.

Her son Jens Brenaa was also an actor in the mid-1970s.

== Filmography ==
- De bør forelske Dem - 1935
- Bag Københavns kulisser - 1935
- Panserbasse - 1936
- Sjette trækning - 1936
- Mille, Marie og mig - 1937
- En fuldendt gentleman - 1937
- Der var engang en vicevært - 1937
- Den mandlige husassistent - 1938
- De tre, måske fire - 1939
- Familien Olsen - 1940
- Peter Andersen - 1941
- Alle går rundt og forelsker sig - 1941
- Tyrannens fald - 1942
- Lykken kommer - 1942
- Lev livet let - 1944
- Op med lille Martha - 1946
- Den stjålne minister - 1949
- Bag de røde porte - 1951
- Det gamle guld - 1951
- Hold fingrene fra mor - 1951
- Fodboldpræsten - 1951
