= Journey to the Seventh Planet =

1962 film by Sidney W. Pink

- Theatrical release poster
- Directed by: Sidney W. Pink
- Screenplay by: Ib Melchior; Sidney W. Pink
- Produced by: Sidney Pink
- Starring: John Agar; Greta Thyssen; Carl Ottosen; Ove Sprogøe; Ann Smyrner; Mimi Heinrich
- Cinematography: Jack Greenhalgh
- Edited by: Philip Cahn
- Music by: Ib Glindemann; Ronald Stein
- Color process: Eastmancolor
- Production company: Cinemagic Inc.
- Distributed by: American International Pictures (U.S.)
- Release date: March 1962
- Running time: 77 minutes
- Countries: Denmark; United States
- Languages: Danish; English
- Budget: $75,000

Journey to the Seventh Planet is a 1962 Danish-American science fiction film. It was directed by Sid Pink, written by Pink and Ib Melchior, and shot in Denmark with a budget of only US$75,000.

Uranus, the seventh planet in the Solar System, has not been charted by the United Nations' Space Fleet. Therefore, in 2001, an international crew has been dispatched to Uranus by the United Nations, which has become a world government, on a space exploration mission. The film's ideas of astronauts exploring outer space only to confront their inner mindscapes and memories precede the similar-themed 1972 film Solaris by a full decade (although the novel Solaris was published a year prior to this film). The film is also reminiscent of Ray Bradbury's 1948 short story "Mars Is Heaven!" and the manifestations of the subconscious in Forbidden Planet.

== Plot ==
In the year 2001, while an international five-man team is on their way to Uranus, an alien presence briefly assumes control of the crew's minds. They awaken safely, but notice that a long — and unexplained — period of time has passed. Upon landing, the crew finds a forested land oddly like Earth's, rather than the cold, bleak world they were expecting. This forest is surrounded by a mysterious barrier. One of the crew pushes his arm through the barrier, only to have it frozen.

New features and forms begin to appear each time they are imagined by the crew. A familiar-looking village appears, complete with attractive women whom the various male crew members have known in the past. Soon, they must face a series of strange beasts, including a giant bipedal cyclopean rodent and a large lobster-like creature. The crew realizes that they have been the victims of mind control by a gigantic one-eyed brain living in a cave. There, they are confronted by the "Being", whose mysterious brain cuts to the inner thoughts of the explorers and causes their thoughts to appear as seemingly real. The brain-Being plans to possess the astronauts' bodies and have them take it with them back to Earth where it will implement a plan for global domination. The crew gradually come to realize their peril and start to fight back against the presence, even eliciting aid from the sympathetic women. They must then confront the Being in its lair while it assaults each with monsters spawned from their fears. After fighting the Being, they return to their rocket ship and leave Uranus.

== Cast ==
- John Agar as Captain Don Graham (American)
- Carl Ottosen as Commander Eric Nilsson (British)
- Peter Monch as Lt. Karl Heinrich (West Germany)
- Ove Sprogøe as Barry O'Sullivan (Irish)
- Louis Miehe-Renard as Svend Viltoft (Swedish)
- Ann Smyrner as Ingrid
- Greta Thyssen as Greta
- Ulla Moritz as Lise Martens
- Mimi Heinrich as Ursula
- Annie Birgit Garde as Ellen
- Bente Juel as Colleen

== Reception ==
AllMovie reviewer Craig Butler wrote that although the film "is a cheesy, terribly bad slice of low-budget science fiction", it was also "one of those bad films that's quite a lot of fun to laugh at. It's also rather endearing". Writing for Reel Reviews, Loron Hays described the film as "laughably silly" and that "[t]his is not a good film. But you will laugh".

== See also ==
- List of American films of 1962
