= 1001 Danish Delights =

1972 film

- Film poster
- Directed by: Sven Methling
- Written by: Preben Kaas; Sven Methling
- Produced by: Gerhard Palle; Henrik Sandberg
- Starring: Dirch Passer
- Cinematography: Rolf Rønne
- Edited by: Janus Billeskov Jansen; Sven Methling
- Release date: 4 February 1972
- Running time: 88 minutes
- Country: Denmark
- Language: Danish

1001 Danish Delights (Danish: Takt og tone i himmelsengen) is a 1972 Danish comedy film directed by Sven Methling and starring Dirch Passer and Axel Strøbye.

== Cast ==
- Dirch Passer – Grev Axel von Hasteen
- Axel Strøbye – Baron Joachim von Hasteen
- Poul Bundgaard – Peter, butler
- Clara Pontoppidan – Enkegrevinde von Hasteen
- Lone Hertz – Kriminalassistent Marie Hansen
- Judy Gringer – Sonja, kaldet Julie
- Gunnar Lemvigh – Flammevold
- Ole Ishøy – Flammevolds nevø
- Agnete Wahl – Helene
- Denise Lee Dann – Denise
- Susanne Saabye – Cecilie
- Erik Holmey – Ung mand til hest
- Merete Kjellow – Ingrid
- Gertie Jung – Margaretha
- Inta Briedis – Suzette
- Lisbeth Westergaard – Elise
- Susanne Breuning – Lancierdansende pige
- Lene Vasegaard – Pige, der masserer baronens ben
- Conni Muchitsch – Birgitte
- Dorte Holst – Benedicte
- Ninette Følsgaard – Jeanette
- Kai Holm – Chauffør Johansen
- Claus Nissen – Kriminalassistent Hansen
- Jytte Breuning – Bryllupsgæst
- Sigrid Horne-Rasmussen – Fru Thomsen
- Esper Hagen – Georg Thomsen
