= Johannes Marott =

Danish actor (1917–1985)

- Born: 14 June 1917; Frederiksberg, Denmark
- Died: 21 November 1985 (aged 68); Denmark
- Occupation: Actor
- Years active: 1949-1981

Johannes Marott (14 June 1917 – 21 November 1985) was a Danish film actor. He appeared in 19 films between 1949 and 1981.

He was born in Frederiksberg, Denmark and died in Denmark.

== Filmography ==
- Kniven i hjertet (1981)
- Alt på et bræt (1977)
- Venus fra Vestø (1962)
- Ballade på Bullerborg (1959)
- Pigen og vandpytten (1958)
- Soldaterkammerater (1958)
- Ung kærlighed (1958)
- Verdens rigeste pige (1958)
- Krudt og klunker (1958)
- Mariannes bryllup (1958)
- Englen i sort (1957)
- Ingen tid til kærtegn (1957)
- Vi som går stjernevejen (1956)
- Den store gavtyv (1956)
- Vejrhanen (1952)
- Susanne (1950)
- Det hændte i København (1949)
- Kampen mod uretten (1949)
- Thorkild Roose (1949)
