= Aage Redal =

Danish actor (1891–1950)

- Born: 27 May 1891; Copenhagen, Denmark
- Died: 19 November 1950 (aged 59); Frederiksberg, Denmark

Aage Redal (27 May 1891 – 19 November 1950) was a Danish stage and film actor.

== Selected filmography ==
- Grønkøbings glade gavtyve - 1925
- Ulvejægerne - 1926
- Don Quixote - 1926
- Sun Over Denmark - 1936
- Bolettes brudefærd - 1938
- En lille tilfældighed - 1939
- I de gode gamle dage - 1940
- Sommerglæder - 1940
- En søndag på Amager - 1941
- Thummelumsen - 1941
- Peter Andersen - 1941
- Biskoppen - 1944
- Det bødes der for - 1944
- Mordets melodi - 1944
- Besættelse - 1944
- En ny dag gryer - 1945
- For frihed og ret - 1949
