= We Who Go the Kitchen Route =

1953 film

- Directed by: Erik Balling
- Written by: Sigrid Boo (novel)
- Produced by: John Hilbert
- Starring: Birgitte Reimer; Ib Schønberg; Ellen Margrethe Stein
- Cinematography: Verner Jensen; Poul Pedersen
- Edited by: Carsten Dahl
- Music by: Hans Schreiber
- Production company: Nordisk Film
- Release date: 2 February 1953
- Running time: 104 minutes
- Country: Denmark
- Language: Danish

We Who Go the Kitchen Route Danish: Vi som går køkkenvejen) is a 1953 Danish comedy film directed by Erik Balling and starring Birgitte Reimer, Ib Schønberg and Ellen Margrethe Stein.

== Cast ==
- Birgitte Reimer as Helga
- Ib Schønberg as Helgas far
- Ellen Margrethe Stein as Tanten
- Henrik Wiehe as Jørgen
- Henning Moritzen as Dick
- Jytte Grathwohl as Grethe
- Jytte Ibsen as Nina
- Anne Arntz as Lisbeth
- Bent Christensen as Erik
- Gunnar Lauring as Salgschefen
- Karin Nellemose as Fruen
- Johannes Meyer as Redaktør Sort
- Anna Henriques-Nielsen as Fruen
- Svend Methling as Godsejer Bech
- Agnes Rehni as Fru Bech
- Lise Ringheim as Lotte
- Vera Gebuhr as Fru Bewer
- Jens Meincke as Lille Povl
- Inger Lassen as Laura
- Kirsten Rolffes as Olga
- Keld Markuslund as Andreas
- Bjørn Watt-Boolsen as Hans Frigaard
- Ove Sprogøe as Skrædder Opdal
- Gabriel Axel as Professor
- Otto Detlefsen as Inkassator
- Preben Thyring as Salgschefens barn
- Jørgen Thyring as Salgschefens barn
- Janette Døllé as Salgschefens barn

== Bibliography ==
- Mette Hjort & Ib Bondebjerg. The Danish Directors: Dialogues on a Contemporary National Cinema. Intellect Books, 2003.
