= Blændværk =

1955 film

- Poster
- Directed by: Johan Jacobsen
- Written by: Erik Fiehn
- Produced by: Annelise Hovmand; Johan Jacobsen
- Starring: Mimi Heinrich
- Cinematography: Kjeld Arnholtz
- Music by: Erik Fiehn
- Distributed by: ASA Filmudlejning
- Release date: August 8, 1955
- Running time: 102 minutes
- Country: Denmark
- Language: Danish

Blændværk is a 1955 Danish crime film drama directed by Johan Jacobsen. The film stars Mimi Heinrich.

== Plot ==
Børge Rasmussen is in love with Elvie Hansen. During a visit at doctor Kermer's, Børge steals a small fortune in cash. Together with Elvie, he runs off to Copenhagen. On their way there, Elvie breaks up. In Copenhagen, the saboteur Verner seeks out Børge, convincing him to go to Canada, bringing a briefcase for a friend of Verner's. Børges friend, Marinus, finds out that there is a bomb in the briefcase, but on his way to warn Børge, Marinus is murdered. Before dying, though, he manages to tell doctor Kermer about the bomb. Together with Elvie, Kermer now leaves for Copenhagen to save Børge.

== Cast ==
- Mimi Heinrich as Elvi Hansen
- Henrik Wiehe as Børge Rasmussen
- Poul Reichhardt as Labour union chairman Marinus
- Kjeld Petersen as President of the party Werner Schultz
- Poul Müller as Seaman Otto
- Asbjørn Andersen as Dr. med. Hans Kerner
- Vera Gebuhr as Charlotte Kerner
- Johannes Meyer as Editor at Sallinghavn county paper
- Karen Lykkehus as Elvis' mother, Dagny
- Jakob Nielsen as Pilot Anthon Olsen
- Jørn Jeppesen as Børges master, Auto-Søren
- Lauritz Olsen as Waiter Frandsen
- Bodil Udsen as Lady from child welfare services
