= Sigrid Horne-Rasmussen =

Danish actress (1915–1982)

- Born: 22 September 1915; Hellerup, Denmark
- Died: 24 April 1982 (aged 66); Frederiksberg, Denmark

Sigrid Horne-Rasmussen (22 September 1915 – 24 April 1982) was a Danish stage and film actress. She was married to Danish actor and comedian Dirch Passer.

== Filmography ==
- Sun Over Denmark – 1936
- Bolettes brudefærd – 1938
- I dag begynder livet – 1939
- Skilsmissens børn – 1939
- Komtessen på Stenholt – 1939
- En lille tilfældighed – 1939
- En ganske almindelig pige – 1940
- En mand af betydning – 1941
- Alle går rundt og forelsker sig – 1941
- Tag til Rønneby Kro – 1941
- Afsporet – 1942
- Op med humøret – 1943
- Det brændende spørgsmål – 1943
- Som du vil ha' mig – 1943
- Lev livet let – 1944
- Elly Petersen – 1944
- Bedstemor går amok – 1944
- Teatertosset – 1944
- Man elsker kun een gang – 1945
- Stjerneskud – 1947
- De pokkers unger – 1947
- Røverne fra Rold – 1947
- Nålen – 1951
- Drömsemester – 1952
- Vores lille by – 1954
- På tro og love – 1955
- Det var på Rundetårn – 1955
- Altid ballade – 1955
- Ung leg – 1956
- Den kloge mand – 1956
- Hvad vil De ha'? – 1956
- Ingen tid til kærtegn – 1957
- Sønnen fra Amerika – 1957
- Det lille hotel – 1958
- Krudt og klunker – 1958
- Pigen og vandpytten – 1958
- Soldaterkammerater – 1958
- Ung kærlighed – 1958
- Ballade på Bullerborg – 1959
- Soldaterkammerater på efterårsmanøvre – 1961
- To skøre ho'der – 1961
- Ullabella – 1961
- Pigen og pressefotografen – 1963
- Majorens oppasser – 1964
- Een pige og 39 sømænd – 1965
- Flådens friske fyre – 1965
- Jensen længe leve – 1965
- Passer passer piger – 1965
- Pigen og millionæren – 1965
- En ven i bolignøden – 1965
- I, a Lover – 1966
- Pigen og greven – 1966
- Hunger – 1966
- Far laver sovsen – 1967
- Nyhavns glade gutter – 1967
- Jeg – en kvinde 2 – 1968
- Min søsters børn vælter byen – 1968
- Ta' lidt solskin – 1969
- Damernes ven – 1969
- Min søsters børn når de er værst – 1971
- Tandlæge på sengekanten – 1971
- Takt og tone i himmelsengen – 1972
- I Jomfruens tegn – 1973
- På'en igen Amalie – 1973
- I Tyrens tegn – 1974
- I Løvens tegn – 1976
