= Det ender med bryllup =

1943 film

- Directed by: Lau Lauritzen Jr.
- Written by: Peter Lind
- Produced by: Henning Karmark
- Starring: Poul Reumert
- Cinematography: Rudolf Frederiksen
- Edited by: Sven Ejlersen
- Distributed by: ASA Film
- Release date: 1 October 1943
- Running time: 80 minutes
- Country: Denmark
- Language: Danish

Det ender med bryllup (It Ends with a Wedding) is a 1943 Danish comedy film directed by Lau Lauritzen Jr. and starring Poul Reumert.

== Cast ==
- Poul Reumert - Fabrikant Steen Andersen
- Berthe Qvistgaard - Rideskolelæreinde Grethe Mikkelsen
- Ib Schønberg - Propagandachef Ib Holm
- Poul Reichhardt - Reklamefuldmægtig Poul Hammer
- Povl Wøldike - Sekretær Jørgensen
- Charles Wilken - Andersen
- Susanne Friis - Fru Andersen
- Knud Heglund - Hovmester Thomsen
- Sigurd Langberg - Berider Mikkelsen
- Henry Nielsen - Staldknægten Herluf
- Anita Prülaider - Irene
- Preben Kaas - Piccolo
- Poul Petersen
