= Vera Gebuhr =

Danish actress (1916–2014)

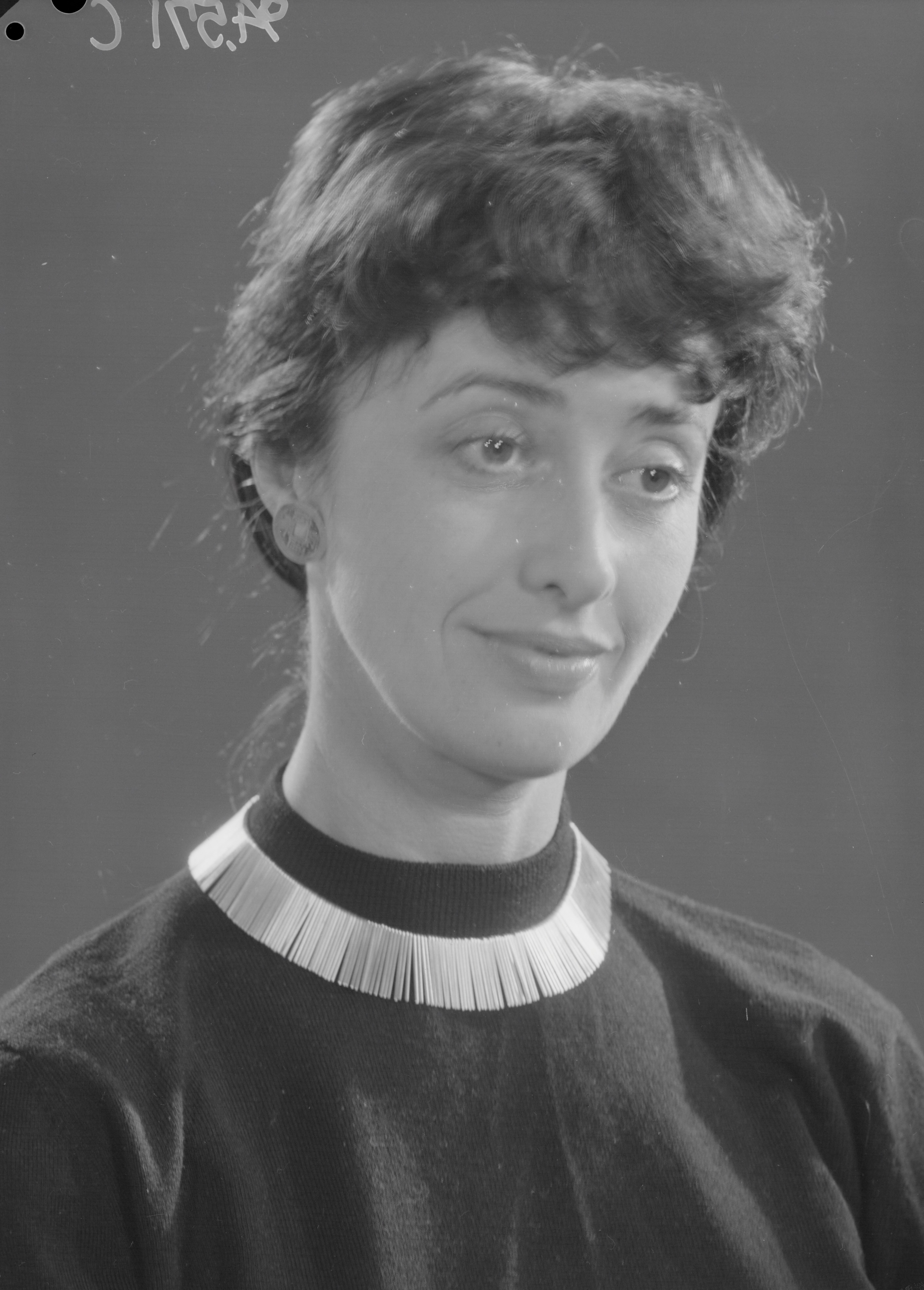
- Born: 15 May 1916; Odense, Denmark
- Died: 22 December 2014 (aged 98); Gentofte, Denmark
- Occupation: Actress
- Years active: 1937–2005

Vera Margrethe Gebuhr (15 May 1916 – 22 December 2014) was a Danish film, television and stage actress. Gebuhr was most noted for her portrayal of the snobbish neurotic head saleswoman Miss Jørgensen in the popular television series Matador. She trained at the Royal Danish Theatre school from 1937 to 1939 and debuted at the Folketeatret, working there until 1964. She played her first lead film role as the scheming maid in the 1943 melodrama Møllen. Gebuhr appeared in 65 films between 1937 and 2005, as well as made numerous appearances on Danish television series.

Gebuhr married twice: to journalist Pallet Fønss and civil engineer Thomas Purl. In 1999, she received the Preben Neergaard honorary award. She died in her home at the age of 98 on 22 December 2014.

== Filmography ==
- Flådens blå matroser – 1937
- Tag det som en mand – 1941
- Frøken Vildkat – 1942
- Som du vil ha' mig – 1943
- Møllen – 1943
- Lev livet let – 1944
- Elly Petersen – 1944
- Besættelse – 1944
- Hans store aften – 1946
- Diskret ophold – 1946
- Ta', hvad du vil ha' – 1947
- For frihed og ret – 1947
- Kampen mod uretten – 1949
- Min kone er uskyldig – 1950
- Lynfotografen – 1950
- Familien Schmidt – 1951
- We Who Go the Kitchen Route – 1953
- The Crime of Tove Andersen – 1953
- Blændværk – 1955
- Kispus – 1956
- Skovridergården – 1957
- Ingen tid til kærtegn – 1957
- Krudt og klunker – 1958
- Ballade på Bullerborg – 1959
- Oskar – 1962
- Duellen – 1962
- Et døgn uden løgn – 1963
- Premiere i helvede – 1964
- Gertrud – 1964
- Nøglen til Paradis – 1970
- Far til fire i højt humør – 1971
- Tjærehandleren – 1971
- Den forsvundne fuldmægtig – 1971
- Farlige kys – 1972
- Mig og Mafiaen – 1973
- Mafiaen, det er osse mig – 1974
- Pas på ryggen, professor – 1977
- Olsen-banden overgiver sig aldrig – 1979
- Pengene eller livet – 1982
- Kurt og Valde – 1983
- Min farmors hus – 1984
- Sidste akt – 1987
- Elvis Hansen – en samfundshjælper – 1988
- Europa – 1991
- Sort høst – 1993
- Davids bog – 1996
- Riget II – 1997
- Let's Get Lost – 1997
- Se dagens lys – 2003
- Afgrunden – 2004
