= Carit Etlar =

Danish author

Carl Brosbøll
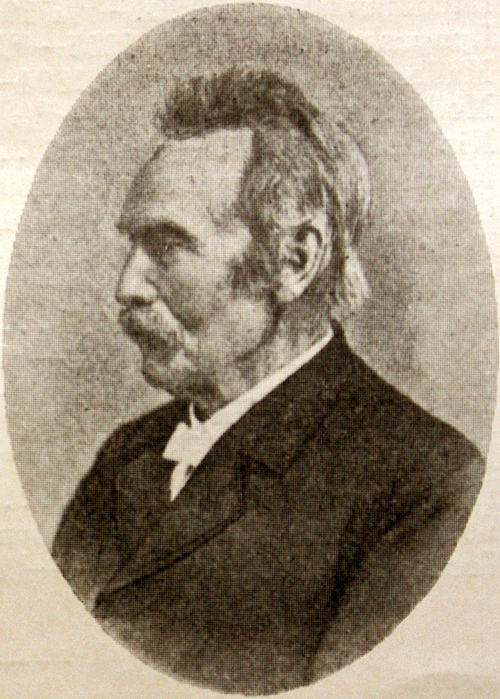
- Born: Johan Carl Christian Brosbøll; August 7, 1816; Fredericia, Denmark
- Died: May 9, 1900 (aged 83)
- Spouse(s): Hansine Erasmine Thorbjørnsen, Olga Augusta Schultz
- Writing career
- Pen name: Carit Etlar
- Notable works: Smuglerens Søn (1839); Gjøngehøvdingen (1853); Dronningens Vagtmester (1855)

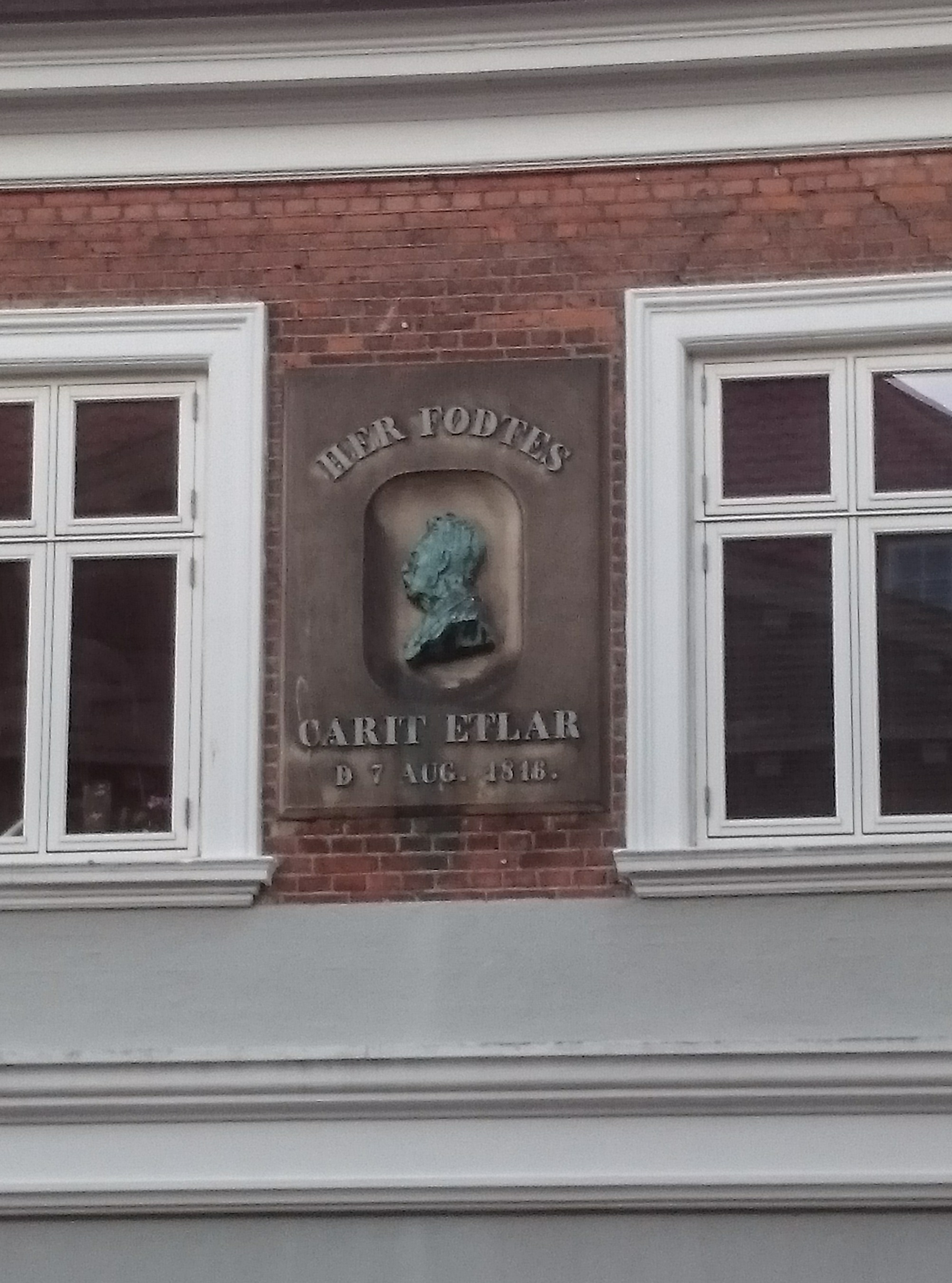
Memorial plaque of Carit Etlar at the house where he was born in 1816 in Fredericia.

Carit Etlar, the better-known pen name of Carl Brosbøll (August 7, 1816 – May 9, 1900), was a Danish author, known mostly for his 1853 book Gjøngehøvdingen about the eponymous Svend Poulsen Gønge.

== Biography ==
Born Johan Carl Christian Brosbøll on August 7, 1816 in Fredericia. In his childhood, Brosbøll developed an interest in tales of taters and other outcasts. His father was a businessman, and Carl spent much time travelling through Jutland for his father. He was a talented drawer and started studying at the Royal Danish Academy of Fine Arts. He eventually abandoned his drawing studies, and finished a university degree in 1844. Brosbøll joined the Danish army for the 1848 First Schleswig War, and was employed at the Royal Danish Library in 1853. Owing to ill health, he gave up his library work in 1885, and went travelling, especially on Corsica. He was married in 1851 to Hansine Erasmine Thorbjørnsen, whom he later divorced to marry Olga Augusta Schultz in 1888.

== Authorship ==
Brosbøll had poems and articles published in various magazines, before making his breakthrough with the 1839 novel Smuglerens Søn (the Smuggler's Son) under the pen name Carit Etlar. He would use the name Carit Etlar for the rest of his professional career. He wrote as an anonymous playwright for the Royal Danish Theatre in 1844. In 1853, he published Gjøngehøvdingen (The Partisan Chieftain), a fictionalized account of historical figure Svend Poulsen Gønge's exploits during the 17th century, centering on the 1658–1660 Dano-Swedish War. Gjøngehøvdingen was hugely popular, and was followed up by the 1855 sequel Dronningens Vagtmester (The Queen's Bodyguard). Etlar published more than 75 short stories, books, and plays through his career, and was active until his death.

Etlar's literary style was unique in Denmark, as it was highly varied and inventive. It relied on entertaining and fast-paced adventure, with effective focus on action with the main character beating improbable odds. His descriptions of Jutland, which he knew extensively from his youth, was likened to that of Steen Steensen Blicher. He had a fundamental fascination with everyday common life, writing with strong nationalistic overtones, and in his time, Etlar's popular appeal was second only to B. S. Ingemann. However, his writing was also criticized for being trivial, and for relying on variations of the same character archetypes, with his main characters most often modelled on D'Artagnan.

== Selected bibliography ==
- Smuglerens Søn - (1839)
- Madsalune - (1841)
- Strandrøveren - (1853)
- Gjøngehøvdingen - (1853)
- Dronningens Vagtmester - (1855)
- Vaabenmesteren - (1855)
- Herremænd - short novel (1855)
- I Dynekilen - drama (1862)
- Herverts Krønike - (1863)
- Krigsbilleder - short novel (1865)
- Broget Selskab - (1868)
- Tranens Varsel - (1869)
- Viben Peter - (1874)
- Tordenskjold i Dynekilen - drama (1872)
- Fangen paa Kalø - (about Gustav Vasa) (1877)
- Salomon Baadsmand - (1881)
- Minder, fortalt af ham selv - (autobiography) (1896)

== Adaptations ==
- Gøngehøvdingen, 1961 film
- Dronningens vagtmester, 1963 film
- Gøngehøvdingen, 1990 musical
- Gøngehøvdingen, 1992 TV series
