= Jeanne Darville =

Danish actress (1923–1995)

- Born: 18 August 1923; Copenhagen, Denmark
- Died: 9 May 1995 (aged 71); Denmark
- Occupation: Actress
- Years active: 1939–1978

Jeanne Darville (18 August 1923 – 9 May 1995) was a Danish film actress. She appeared in 30 films between 1939 and 1978. She was born in Copenhagen, Denmark and died in Denmark. She was in the film series "min søsters børn", playing the mother of her real life daughter, Pusle Helmuth.

== Filmography ==
- Agent 69 Jensen i Skyttens tegn (1978)
- The Loves of Cynthia (1972)
- Kid Gang on the Go (1971)
- Welcome to the Club (1971)
- Sonja - 16 år (1969)
- Tænk på et tal (1969)
- Min søsters børn vælter byen (1968)
- Min søsters børn på bryllupsrejse (1967)
- Elsk... din næste! (1967)
- Min kones ferie (1967)
- Jeg - en marki (1967)
- Min søsters børn (1966)
- Jag - en älskare (1966)
- Pigen og millionæren (1965)
- En ven i bolignøden (1965)
- Premiere i helvede (1964)
- Sømand i knibe (1960)
- Kvindelist og kærlighed (1960)
- Styrmand Karlsen (1958)
- Verdens rigeste pige (1958)
- Et eventyr om tre (1954)
- Fløjtespilleren (1953)
- Road to Home (1952)
- To minutter for sent (1952)
- Vi vil ha' et barn (1949)
- Så mødes vi hos Tove (1946)
- Regnen holdt op (1942)
- Afsporet (1942)
- Tag til Rønneby Kro (1941)
- Alle går rundt og forelsker sig (1941)
- Skilsmissens børn (1939)
