= Den store gavtyv =

1956 film

- Directed by: Johan Jacobsen
- Written by: Arvid Müller
- Starring: Dirch Passer
- Cinematography: Henning Bendtsen
- Edited by: Annelise Hovmand
- Release date: 5 March 1956
- Running time: 94 minutes
- Country: Denmark
- Language: Danish

Den store gavtyv is a 1956 Danish comedy film directed by Johan Jacobsen and starring Dirch Passer and Ole Monty.

In this 94-minute film, crime writer Rodian checks into a hotel that used to be the hideout for the thief Mathisen and his gang. When Rodian falls asleep, Mathisen reads his manuscripts and copies the fictional crimes, landing Rodian in trouble.

== Cast ==
- Dirch Passer as K.M.M. Mathisen
- Ole Monty as S.P.R.F. Rodian
- Asbjørn Andersen as Forlægger Stenbæk
- Marguerite Viby as Else Jessen
- Preben Mahrt as Erik Jessen
- Bodil Miller as Anna Lise, Rodians niece
- Oscar Ljung as Kalle Karlfeldt
- Johannes Marott as Viggo Frederiksen
- Professor Tribini as Alfred Mogensen
- Gunnar Bigum as Tjener 'Stoffer'
- Henry Nielsen as Nattevagt
- Mogens Brandt as Bankkunde
- Kjeld Petersen as Værtshusgæst
- Hans Brenå as Akrobatdanseren
- Mogens Davidsen as Bartender Christiansen
- Paul Mourier as Juvelereren
- Jens Kjeldby as Bankkasseren
- Per Wiking
- Tao Michaëlis
- Holger Juul Hansen as Kriminalassistent Rønne
- Mimi Heinrich as Guldsmedens veninde
- Lisbeth Movin as Sekretær
- Alfred Wilken as Guldsmeden
