= Keld Markuslund =

Danish actor (1921–1972)

- Born: 9 July 1921; Holmstrup, Denmark
- Died: 20 October 1972 (aged 51); Denmark
- Occupation: Actor
- Years active: 1951-1972

Keld Markuslund (9 July 1921 – 20 October 1972) was a Danish film actor. He appeared in 35 films between 1951 and 1973.

== Selected filmography ==
- Vi arme syndere (1952)
- We Who Go the Kitchen Route (1953)
- Flintesønnerne (1956)
- The Girls Are Willing (1958)
- Vi er allesammen tossede (1959)
- Charles' Aunt (1959)
- Forelsket i København (1960)
- Gøngehøvdingen (1961)
- Crazy Paradise (1962)
- Der brænder en ild (1962)
- Den kære familie (1962)
