= Bjarne Forchhammer =

Danish actor (1903–1970)

- Born: 14 September 1903; Germany
- Died: 3 April 1970 (aged 66); Denmark
- Occupation: Actor
- Years active: 1933-1968

Bjarne Forchhammer (14 September 1903 – 3 April 1970) was a Danish film actor. He appeared in 25 films between 1933 and 1968. He was born in Germany and died in Denmark.

== Filmography ==
- Kongen bød (1938)
- The Child (1940)
- Vagabonden (1940)
- Jeg har elsket og levet (1940)
- Tante Cramers testamente (1941)
- Peter Andersen (1941)
- Afsporet (1942)
- Forellen (1942)
- Naar man kun er ung (1943)
- Ebberød Bank (1943)
- Biskoppen (1944)
- Bedstemor går amok (1944)
- Billet mrk. (1946)
- Ta', hvad du vil ha' (1947)
- John og Irene (1949)
- For frihed og ret (1949)
- Min kone er uskyldig (1950)
- Susanne (1950)
- Flemming og Kvik (1960)
- Ullabella (1961)
- Rififi in Stockholm (1961)
- En blandt mange (1961)
- Rikki og mændene (1962)
- Det var en lørdag aften (1968)
