= Anna Henriques-Nielsen =

Danish actress (1881–1962)

- Born: 8 December 1881; Copenhagen, Denmark
- Died: 24 December 1962 (aged 81); Denmark
- Occupation: Actress
- Years active: 1941–1958

Anna Henriques-Nielsen (8 December 1881 – 24 December 1962) was a Danish stage and film actress. She appeared in 29 films between 1941 and 1958. She was born in Copenhagen, Denmark and died in Denmark.

== Filmography ==
- I folkets navn – 1938
- Thummelumsen – 1941
- Tak fordi du kom, Nick – 1941
- Natekspressen – 1942
- Når man kun er ung – 1943
- Mordets melodi – 1944
- Det kære København – 1944
- Otte akkorder – 1944
- Så mødes vi hos Tove – 1946
- Ditte Menneskebarn – 1946
- Ta', hvad du vil ha' – 1947
- Den stjålne minister – 1949
- Mosekongen – 1950
- Bag de røde porte – 1951
- Fra den gamle købmandsgård – 1951
- Avismanden – 1952
- Den gamle mølle på Mols – 1953
- We Who Go the Kitchen Route – 1953
- Vores lille by – 1954
- Himlen er blå – 1954
- Færgekroen – 1956
- Tre piger fra Jylland – 1957
- Guld og grønne skove – 1958
- Mor skal giftes – 1958
- Vagabonderne på Bakkegården – 1958
