= En mand af betydning =

1941 film

- Directed by: Emanuel Gregers
- Written by: Leck Fischer; Fleming Lynge
- Starring: Osvald Helmuth
- Cinematography: Valdemar Christensen
- Edited by: Valdemar Christensen; Carl H. Petersen
- Distributed by: Nordisk Film
- Release date: 22 March 1941
- Running time: 94 minutes
- Country: Denmark
- Language: Danish

En mand af betydning is a 1941 Danish family film directed by Emanuel Gregers and starring Osvald Helmuth.

== Cast ==
- Osvald Helmuth as Baldur Justesen
- Sigrid Horne-Rasmussen as Fru Sonja Jensen
- Inger Stender as Anita Justesen
- Jens Asby as Bankassistent Georg Brink
- Poul Reichhardt as Brødkusk Poul Elvang
- Helge Kjærulff-Schmidt as Vicevært Christensen
- Tove Bang as Fru Olga Christensen
- Aage Fønss as Overassistent Bækgaard
- Peter Nielsen as Tømrermester Skjoldager
- Carl Viggo Meincke as Maler Nielsen
- Charles Wilken as Skrædder Hassmann
- Sigurd Langberg as Kriminalbetjent Hjemfeldt
- Kaj Mervild as Kriminalbetjent Brede-Hansen
- Gerda Madsen as Fru Mortensen
- Ulrik Neumann as Henry
- Asta Hansen as Sofie
- Petrine Sonne as Fru Lewald
- Alex Suhr as Kriminalassistent Husum
