= Aage Fønss =

Danish opera singer and actor (1887–1976)

- Fønss in the silent film Ambrosius, 1910
- Born: 12 December 1887; Aarhus, Denmark
- Died: 30 September 1976 (aged 88); Copenhagen, Denmark
- Years active: 1936–1964
- Spouse: Gundrun Johanne Theodora Carlson (m. 1910–1971)
- Relatives: Olaf Fønss (brother)

Aage Fønss (12 December 1887 – 30 September 1976) was a Danish operatic bass-baritone and actor. Between opera, film, and the theatre, Fønss tended to gravitate towards comedic roles. He was sometimes billed under the stage name Aage Zimmermann.

All of Fønss' brothers were also involved in the dramatic arts and he received vocal and theatrical training from a young age. As an actor, he made his theatrical debut in 1906, before debuting on film in 1910. His career as an opera singer took place primarily in Germany, during the 1910s. His most notable roles as a film actor were filmed in the late 1930s. By the 1950s, his acting style was no longer considered fashionable, and the later part of his career primarily saw him act in supporting roles.

== Early life and education ==
Aage Fønss was born 12 December 1887 in Aarhus to Henriette née Zimmermann (d. 1909) and organist Vilhelm Fønss (d. 1918). He was the youngest of three brothers, all of whom pursued acting careers. His brother, Johannes, was a famous operatic bass, and his brother Olaf became a film director and producer.

Fønss received his early theater training under Benjamin Christensen, who was an opera singer at the Royal Danish Theatre at the time. He graduated from Aarhus Katedralskole in 1905 and received a candidate's degree in 1906. He trained as a bass-baritone.

== Career ==
=== Stage career ===
Fønss made his debut as an actor at the Dagmar Theatre in 1906 under Martinius Nielsen, before going on tour with Albert Helsengreen's theatre company. In 1907, he began working at the Aarhus Theatre before returning to the Dagmar Theatre from 1910 to 1912. Like his brother Olaf, Aage sought work as an actor in Germany both on film and in the theatre. From 1912 to 1917, he performed as a singer at the Bavarian State Opera in Munich. In Munich he performed under the stage name Aage Zimmermann, and continued vocal training under Felix von Kraus. In 1914, he became a court singer in Bavaria.

In 1917, he worked with the Royal Danish Theatre until his departure in 1963. While there, he was made chairman of the theatre's association of actors and actresses and served as a substitute member of the theatre's council. In 1924, he became chairman of the Danish Actors' Association.

Fønss often acted in comedic-character roles; although his opera repertoire included both comedic and dramatic parts in supporting and leading roles. His roles in theatre and opera included Bartolo in The Barber of Seville, the Devil in Schwanda the Bagpiper, Figaro in The Marriage of Figaro, the Grand Inquisitor in Don Carlos, Jeronimus in Maskarade, the King of Egypt in Aida, Leporello in Don Giovanni, Dr. Blind in Die Fledermaus, Kecal in The Bartered Bride, Malvolio in Twelfth Night, Oronte in The Misanthrope, Pistola in Falstaff, Pizarro in Fidelio, and Sparafucile in Rigoletto.

=== Film career ===
In film, Fønss gravitated towards more authoritative roles, like that of professor or lawyer, though his comedic tone also made it on screen. In 1910, he made his film debut with Fotorama, appearing in eight silent films before departing to join Nordisk Film in 1912. He starred in a small number of films with the company, eventually leaving to focus on his theatrical career before returning to film-work in 1919. His most memorable film roles were alongside Marguerite Viby in Mille, Marie og mig (1937), Komtessen på Steenholt (1939), and En Pige med Pep (1940).

In the later part of his career, his theatrical style was considered somewhat antiquated on film. He received few leading roles, but continued to act in supporting roles in the 1950s and 60s.

== Personal life ==
On 25 October 1910, Fønss married the actress Gudrun Johanne Theodora Carlson (1884–1971). Aage Fønss died on 30 September 1976.

== Selected filmography ==
- Kapergasten – 1910
- Elverhøj – 1910
- Valdemar Sejr – 1910
- Ansigttyven I – 1910
- Ansigttyven II – 1910
- Holger Danske – 1913
- Gæstespillet – 1913
- Chatollets hemmelighed – 1916
- Der Pfad der Sünde – 1916
- Das Haus der Leidenschaften – 1916
- Grevindens ære – 1919
- Frie fugle – 1922
- Den sidste dans – 1924
- Paa slaget 12 – 1924
- Panserbasse – 1936
- Mille, Marie og mig – 1937
- Balletten danser – 1938
- Komtessen på Stenholt – 1939
- En pige med pep – 1940
- En mand af betydning – 1941
- Peter Andersen – 1941
- Forellen – 1942
- To som elsker hinanden – 1944
- Besættelse – 1944
- Oktoberroser – 1946
- Kampen mod uretten – 1949
- For frihed og ret – 1949
- Café Paradis – 1950
- Harry og kammertjeneren – 1961
- Paradis retur – 1964
