= The Girls Are Willing =

- Poster by Aage Lundvald
- Directed by: Gabriel Axel
- Written by: Johannes Allen
- Produced by: S. Vinod Pathak
- Starring: Axel Bang
- Cinematography: Jørgen Skov
- Edited by: Carsten Dahl
- Music by: Svend Erik Tarp
- Distributed by: Nordisk Films Kompagni
- Release date: 24 January 1958
- Running time: 92 minutes
- Country: Denmark
- Language: Danish

The Girls Are Willing (Danish: Guld og grønne skove) is a 1958 Danish comedy film directed by Gabriel Axel. It was chosen as Denmark's official submission to the 31st Academy Awards for Best Foreign Language Film, but did not manage to receive a nomination. It was also entered into the 8th Berlin International Film Festival.

Guld og grønne skove was only Gabriel Axel's third feature film as a director, and from the time it came out in 1958, it took exactly 30 years until in 1988 he won his Academy Award for Babette's Feast.

== Plot ==
The two small islands, Hvenø and Birkø, have been in a decade-long conflict, and it therefore creates big problems when three young men from one island falls in love with three beautiful, young girls from the neighbouring island. Nothing could be more unlikely than a marriage between the islands, let alone three! But one day oil is found on the first island, causing a veritable invasion by the US oil company American Super Oil Company, and then the whole little sleepy community is turned completely upside down.

== Cast ==
- Axel Bang - Sognerådsformand Kristian Kristiansen
- Henny Lindorff Buckhøj - Martha
- Verner Tholsgaard - Theo
- Ole Larsen - Postmester Lars Peter
- Else-Marie - Thyra
- Mogens Viggo Petersen - Ole
- Valsø Holm - Købmand Anton
- Cay Kristiansen - Hans
- Anna Henriques-Nielsen - Jensine
- Vilhelm Henriques - Organist Mattis
- Einar Reim - Pastor Breining
- Keld Markuslund - Skolelærer
- Karl Stegger - Sognefoged Søren
- Hanne Winther-Jørgensen - Rigmor
- Judy Gringer - Anna

== See also ==
- List of submissions to the 31st Academy Awards for Best Foreign Language Film
