= 7th Berlin International Film Festival =

1957 film festival in West Berlin, Germany

- Festival poster
- Location: West Berlin, Germany
- Founded: 1951
- Awards: Golden Bear: 12 Angry Men
- Festival date: 21 June – 2 July 1957
- Website: Website

Berlin International Film Festival chronology
- 8th 6th

The 7th annual Berlin International Film Festival was held from 21 June to 2 July 1957.

The Golden Bear was awarded to 12 Angry Men directed by Sidney Lumet. The International Federation of Film Critics awarded FIPRESCI Award for the first time this year.

== Juries ==
The following people were announced as being on the jury for the festival:

=== Main Competition ===
- Jay Carmody, American theatre critic - Jury President
- Jean de Baroncelli, French writer and film critic
- John Sutro, British producer
- Dalpathal Kothari, Indian
- Fernaldo Di Giammatteo, Italian historian and film critic
- Bunzaburo Hayashi, Japanese producer (Japan)
- Miguel Alemán Jr., Mexican producer
- Thorsten Eklann, Swedish journalist
- José María Escudero, Spanish director of photography
- Edmund Luft, West-German playwright, historian and film critic
- Ernst Schröder, West-German actor

=== Documentary and Short Film Competition ===
- Adolf Hübl, Austrian founder of the Bundesstaatliche Hauptstelle für Lichtbild und Bildungsfilm - Jury President
- Paul Heimann, West-German pedagogue
- Paul Louyet, Belgium producer
- Norman McLaren, Canadian director and producer
- Karl Naef, Swiss
- Yrjö Rannikko, Finish producer
- Ahmed Sefrioui, Moroccan

== Official Sections ==
=== Main Competition ===
The following films were in competition for the Golden Bear award:

| English title | Original title | Director(s) | Production Country |
|---|---|---|---|
| 12 Angry Men | | Sidney Lumet | United States |
| 1918 | | T. J. Särkkä | Finland |
| The Adventures of Arsène Lupin | Les Aventures d'Arsène Lupin | Jacques Becker | France, Italy |
| Arashi | 嵐 | Hiroshi Inagaki | Japan |
| Be Dear to Me | Ingen tid til kærtegn | Annelise Hovmand | Denmark |
| Brahim | | Jean Flechet | Morocco |
| El Hombre Señalado | | Francis Lauric | Argentina |
| Fathers and Sons | Padri e figli | Mario Monicelli | Italy |
| Freedom | | Vernon Messenger (uncredited) | Nigeria |
| The Girl from Corfu | Πρωτευουσιάνικες περιπέτειες Protevousianikes peripeteies | Yannis Petropoulakis | Greece |
| Hang Tuah | | Phani Majumdar | Singapore, Malaysia |
| Happiness | Felicidad | Alfonso Corona Blake | Mexico |
| It Was Not in Vain | Nije bilo uzalud | Nikola Tanhofer | Yugoslavia |
| Jonas | | Ottomar Domnick | West Germany |
| Kabuliwala | কাবুলিওয়ালা | Tapan Sinha | India |
| The Last Ones Shall Be First | Die Letzten werden die Ersten sein | Rolf Hansen | West Germany |
| Last Pair Out | Sista paret ut | Alf Sjöberg | Sweden |
| The Man in the Raincoat | L'Homme à l'imperméable | Julien Duvivier | France |
| Manuela | | Guy Hamilton | United Kingdom |
| No Sun in Venice | Sait-on jamais... | Roger Vadim | France, Italy |
| Rendezvous with Forgotten Years | Stevnemøte med glemte år | Jon Lennart Mjøen | Norway |
| Secrets of Life | | James Algar | United States |
| The Spanish Gardener | | Philip Leacock | United Kingdom |
| Tausend Kleine Zeichen | | Herbert Seggelke | West Germany |
| The Teahouse of the August Moon | | Daniel Mann | United States |
| Tizoc | Tizoc: Amor indio | Ismael Rodríguez | Mexico |
| The Tough | الفتوة | Salah Abu Seif | Egypt |
| The Valley of the Lost Soul | 亡魂谷 | Chun Yen | Hong Kong |
| The Wayward Bus | | Victor Vicas | United States |
| The Wedding Day | 시집가는 날 | Lee Byung-il | South Korea |
| Whom God Forgives | Amanecer en Puerta Oscura | José María Forqué | Spain |
| The Window to Luna Park | La finestra sul Luna Park | Luigi Comencini | Italy |
| Woman in a Dressing Gown | | J. Lee Thompson | United Kingdom |

=== Documentary and Short Film Competition ===
| English title | Original title | Director(s) | Country |
|---|---|---|---|
| Big Bill Blues | | Jean Delire | Belgium |
| Gente lontana | | Lionetto Fabbri | Italy |
| The Good Earth | Đất Lành | Ramon A. Estella | South Vietnam |
| Happiness | Felicidad | Alfonso Corona Blake | Mexico |
| The Horse Boy | 暴れん坊街道 | Tomu Uchida | Japan |
| La revolución mexicana en sus murales | | Luis Spota | Mexico |
| The Last Paradise | L'ultimo paradiso | Folco Quilici | Italy |
| Plitvicka jezera | | Dragoslav Holub | Yugoslavia |
| Ruf der Götter | | Dietrich Wawrzyn | West Germany |
| Secrets of Life | | James Algar | United States |
| Tausend kleine Zeichen | | Herbert Seggelke | West Germany |

== Official Awards ==
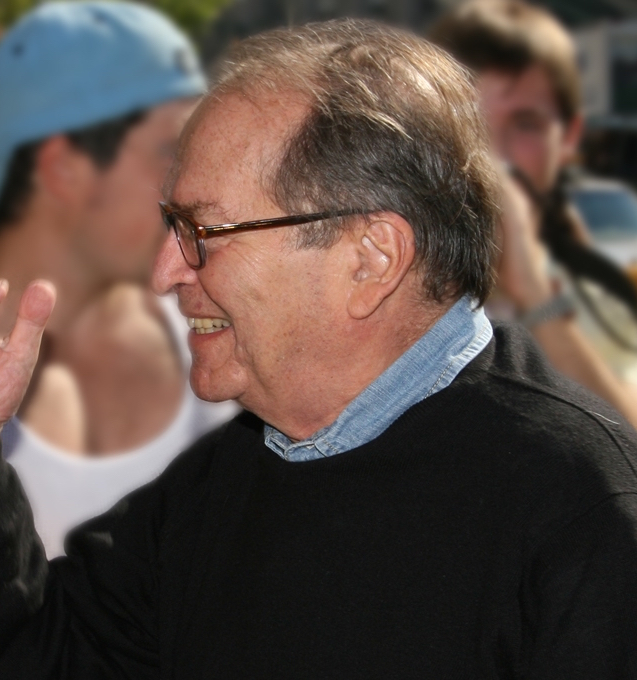
Sidney Lumet, winner of the Golden Bear at the event.

The following prizes were awarded by the Jury:

=== Main Competition ===
- Golden Bear: 12 Angry Men by Sidney Lumet
- Silver Bear for Best Director: Mario Monicelli for Fathers and Sons
- Silver Bear for Best Actress: Yvonne Mitchell for Woman in a Dressing Gown
- Silver Bear for Best Actor: Pedro Infante for Tizoc
- Silver Bear Extraordinary Jury Prize:
  - Whom God Forgives by José María Forqué
  - Kabuliwala by Tapan Sinha

=== Documentary and Short Film Competition ===
- Golden Bear (Documentaries): The secrets of nature by James Algar
- Silver Bear (Documentaries): L'ultimo paradiso by Folco Quilici
- Short Film Golden Bear: Gente lontana by Lionetto Fabbri
- Silver Bear for Best Short Film:
  - Plitvička jezera by Šime Šimatović
  - Tausend kleine Zeichen by Herbert Seggelke
  - Big Bill Blues by Jean Delire

== Independent Awards ==
=== FIPRESCI Award ===
- Woman in a Dressing Gown by J. Lee Thompson
  - Honourable mention: Be Dear to Me by Annelise Hovmand

=== OCIC Award ===
- 12 Angry Men by Sidney Lumet
  - Special Mention: Woman in a Dressing Gown by J. Lee Thompson
