= The Little Match Girl (1953 film) =

- Directed by: Johan Jacobsen
- Written by: Hans Christian Andersen (story); Johan Jacobsen
- Produced by: Johan Jacobsen
- Cinematography: Werner Hedman; Tom Jensen
- Music by: Erik Fiehn
- Production companies: Dansk Kulturfilm; Flamingo
- Release date: 1953
- Running time: 11 minutes
- Country: Denmark
- Language: Danish

The Little Match Girl (Danish: Den lille pige med svovlstikkerne) is a 1953 Danish short adventure film directed by Johan Jacobsen. It is based on Hans Christian Andersen's story The Little Match Girl.

== Cast ==
- Liselotte Krefeld as the little girl
- Agnes Thorberg Wieth as grandmother

== Bibliography ==
- Goble, Alan. The Complete Index to Literary Sources in Film. Walter de Gruyter, 1999.
