= Bodil Ipsen =

Danish actress and film director (1889–1964)

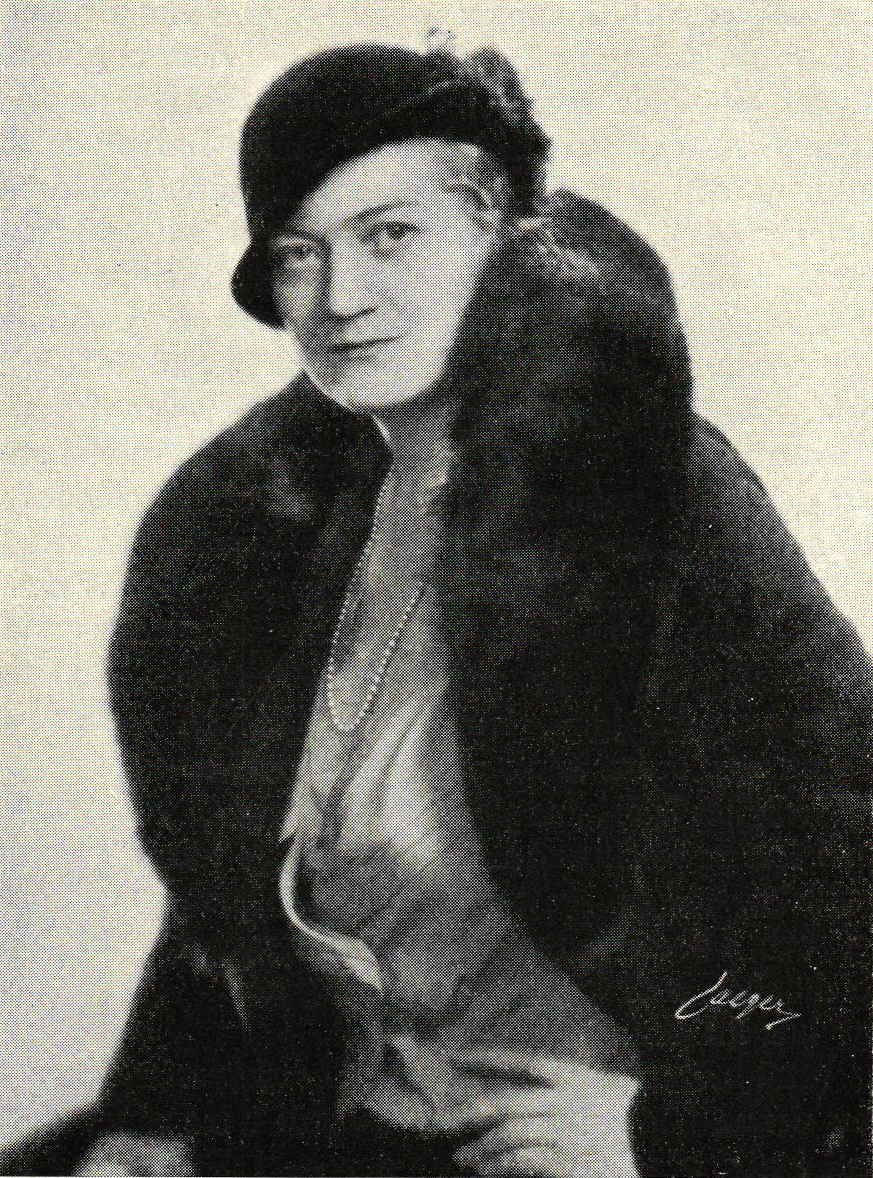
- Born: 30 August 1889; Copenhagen, Denmark
- Died: 26 November 1964 (aged 75); Copenhagen, Denmark
- Occupations: Actor, director
- Years active: 1909 — 1960
- Spouses: 4
- Awards: Cannes Grand Prize; 1946 De Røde Enge Bodil Award; 1951 Cafe Paradis Bodil Award; 1953 De Sande Ansigt Bodil Best Actress; 1960 Tro, Håb og Trolddom

Bodil Ipsen (Danish: [ˈpoːtil ˈipsn̩]; 30 August 1889 – 26 November 1964) was a Danish actress and film director, and is considered one of the great stars of Danish cinematic history. Her acting career, which began in theater and silent films, was marked by leading roles in large folk comedies and melodramas. However, it was as a director that she was most influential: directing the first Danish film noir and making several dark psychological thrillers during the 1940s and 1950s. Ipsen's name along with that of Bodil Kjer is given to Denmark's most celebrated film prize, the Bodil Award.

== Career ==
Bodil Louise Jensen Ipsen was born on 30 August 1889 in Copenhagen, Denmark. In 1908, after obtaining her high school diploma, Ipsen began studying at Det Kongelige Teater (Royal Danish Theatre) and made her stage debut there one year later. Her work on stage quickly received attention. Especially noted were her performances with Danish actor Poul Reumert. Throughout her career, Ipsen performed at the Royal Danish Theatre as well as the Dagmar Theater, The Folketeatret, and The Betty Nansen Theater. She also performed on stage in Sweden and Norway. Ipsen played almost 200 roles in the theater, the majority as lead actress, as well as 150 radio theater roles and four television parts.

In 1920, Ipsen made her film debut as a leading actress in Lavinen, directed by her third husband, Emanuel Gregers. She made films with Gregers in 1922 and 1923. Off and on, she acted in 12 films during her career. Her most noteworthy early performances were in big blustering comedies, such as the shrewish spinster Bollette in Bollettes Brudefærd or the Countess Danner in Gregers' Sørensen og Rasmussen.

Ipsen became a director in 1942 and directed 10 films in 10 years. Although Ipsen's acting talent was showcased in big romantic comedies, her seat in the director's chair marked the development of classic Danish dark dramas and mysteries. Her debut film, which she co-directed with Lau Lauritzen Jr. was the 1942 dark psychological thriller Afsporet (Derailed), the first true Danish film noir. Two years later, Ipsen directed another two even more extreme noirs, Mordets Melodi (Melody of Murder), about a singer accused of serial murders, and Besættelse (Possession), a taut thriller about a man's erotic obsession with a young woman.

After Afsporet Ipsen collaborated with Lau Lauritzen Jr. on four more films. Their second film, De røde enge (The Red Meadows), about the Nazi occupation of Denmark during World War II, received the 1946 Grand Prize at the Cannes Film Festival. In 1950, Ipsen and Lauritzen again won acclaim for their film Café Paradis (Paradise Cafe). The harsh story about alcoholism is considered a masterpiece of Danish cinema, and for which Ipsen won her namesake award, the Bodil, named after her and fellow actress, Bodil Kjer. Two years later, Ipsen and Lauritzen again won the Bodil Award for Best Danish Film for Det Sande Ansigt (The True Face).

In 1960, at age 71, Ipsen was awarded the Bodil again, this time as Leading Actress of the Year for the film Tro, håb og trolddom. Ipsen retired afterwards. She died on 26 November 1964 in Copenhagen. The movie Bodil Ipsen og Filmen (Bodil Ipsen and the Film), released in 2006, is a portrait of her life and career.

== Personal life ==
Ipsen's steady career on stage was offset by a volatile personal life. She was married four times. Ipsen was married the first time in 1910 with the actor Jacob Texière, but the marriage was dissolved within the same year. Then, in 1914, she married civil engineer H.H.O. Moltke, and they divorced after three years. Her marriage in 1919 with film director Emanuel Gregers lasted four years. Ipsen was married for a fourth time in 1932 to the journalist Ejnar Black. They remained together for 17 years until Black's death in 1949. After Black's death, Ipsen isolated herself outside of work, preferring the company of her assistant and housekeeper, Stella Jensen.

I discovered living together with (Bodil Ipsen) during the last ten years of her life a person of infinite talents. A generosity that really knew no limits as well as a noticeable and strange distrust of people, who otherwise she would have been close to.

— Stella Jensen, describing Bodil Ipsen after her death in 1964

== Filmography ==
=== Actress ===
Year	Original Title	English Title	Role	Notes
1913	Scenens børn	Stage Children		
1920	Lavinen	Maria Magdalene	Maria, Poul's Wife	directed by Emanuel Gregers
1922	Frie Fugle	Art and the Woman	Naomi, the Captain's wife	directed by Emanuel Gregers
1923	Madsalune	Love in Exile	Empress Catherine II	directed by Emanuel Gregers
1932	Paustians Uhr	Paustian's Watch	Big Marie	
1935	Det gyldne smil	The Golden Smile	Elsa Bruun	
1938	Bolettes brudefærd	Bolette's Bridal Shower	Bolette Jensen	directed by Emanuel Gregers
1940	Sørensen og Rasmussen	Sorensen and Rasmussen	Countess Danner	directed by Emanuel Gregers
1941	Gå med mig hjem	Come Home With Me	Attorney Helen Hansoe	directed by Benjamin Christensen
1942	Forellen	The Trout	Clara Muller	directed by Emanuel Gregers
1957	Ingen tid til kærtegn	Be Dear to Me	Woman in wheelchair	
1960	Tro, håb og trolddom	Faith Hope and Witchcraft	Grandma Gunhild	won Bodil Award for Best Actress

=== Director ===
Year	Original Title	English Title	Notes
1942	Afsporet	Derailed	co-directed with Lau Lauritzen Jr.
1942	En Herre i kjole og hvidt	A Gentleman in Top Hat and Tails	
1943	Drama på slottet	Drama at the Castle	
1944	Mordets Melodi	Melody of Murder	
1944	Besættelse	Possession	
1945	De røde enge	The Red Meadows	co-directed with Lau Lauritzen Jr. won Palme D'Or
1947	Bröllopsnatten	Wedding Night	produced in Sweden
1948	Støt står den danske sømand	The Viking Watch of the Danish Seaman	co-directed with Lau Lauritzen Jr. won Bodil Award for Best Danish Film
1950	Café Paradis	Cafe Paradise	co-directed with Lau Lauritzen Jr. won Bodil Award for Best Danish Film
1951	Det Sande Ansigt	The Face of Truth	co-directed with Lau Lauritzen Jr. won Bodil Award for Best Danish Film
