= Ebba Nørager =

Danish actress (1927–2021)

- Born: 4 December 1927; Copenhagen, Denmark
- Died: 10 February 2021 (aged 93)
- Occupation: Actress

Ebba Nørager (4 December 1927 – 10 February 2021) was a Danish actress.

== Biography ==
Nørager graduated from the Alliancescenernes Elevskole in 1947 and immediately began acting at the Odense Teater until 1949. As a freelance actress, she appeared on stages such as the Det Ny Teater, Dansk Skolescene, Riddersalen, the Betty Nansen Teatret, and Fiolteatret. She appeared in films such as Take What You Want, Smedestræde 4, and Unge piger forsvinder i København. For a number of years, she was a director at the Statens Bibliotek og Trykkeri for Blinde, where she read many audiobooks. She once appeared on the television series En by i provinsen in 1979. She was given an honorary residence at the Skuespillerforeningen af 1879 in 1975. Nørager remained active until her death.

Ebba Nørager died on 10 February 2021 at the age of 93.
