= Kjeld Petersen =

Danish actor (1920–1962)

- Born: 1 July 1920; Copenhagen, Denmark
- Died: 24 May 1962 (aged 41); Frederiksberg, Denmark
- Resting place: Cemetery of Holmen
- Occupation: Actor
- Years active: 1945–1962

Kjeld Petersen (1 July 1920 – 24 May 1962) was a Danish film and stage actor. He appeared in 41 films between 1945 and 1962, and also enjoyed successes as dramatic stage actor and revue comedian, particularly in a crazy comedy duo with Dirch Passer, under the name "The Kellerdirk Brothers", lasting through the 1950s until his death.

He was born in Copenhagen and died in Frederiksberg, Denmark, suffering a stroke in his home following a successful opening performance at the ABC Theatre in which he performed alongside Passer.

In the 2011 Danish Dirch Passer biopic A Funny Man, Petersen was depicted by Lars Ranthe. A 2013 Danmarks Radio documentary series presented Petersen as one of the "Fantastic Four" of Danish comedy, along with Passer, Jørgen Ryg and Preben Kaas.

== Filmography ==
- Den usynlige hær - 1945
- Far betaler - 1946
- Lise kommer til byen - 1947
- Tre år efter - 1948
- Kampen mod uretten - 1949
- Op og ned langs kysten - 1950
- Den opvakte jomfru - 1950
- Smedestræde 4 - 1950
- Fireogtyve timer - 1951
- Som sendt fra himlen - 1951
- Vores fjerde far - 1951
- Unge piger forsvinder i København - 1951
- Alt dette og Island med - 1951
- Solstik - 1953
- I kongens klær - 1954
- Det var på Rundetårn - 1955
- Blændværk - 1955
- Gengæld - 1955
- Hvad vil De ha'? - 1956
- Færgekroen - 1956
- Den store gavtyv - 1956
- Hidden Fear - 1957
- Skarpe skud i Nyhavn - 1957
- Sønnen fra Amerika - 1957
- Krudt og klunker - 1958
- Pigen og vandpytten - 1958
- Seksdagesløbet - 1958
- Helle for Helene - 1959
- Pigen i søgelyset - 1959
- Poeten og Lillemor - 1959
- Soldaterkammerater rykker ud - 1959
- Vi er allesammen tossede - 1959
- Kvindelist og kærlighed - 1960
- Skibet er ladet med... - 1960
- Den grønne elevator - 1961
- Løgn og løvebrøl - 1961
- Reptilicus - 1961
- Lykkens musikanter - 1962
- Det tossede paradis - 1962
- Sømænd og svigermødre - 1961
