= Marie Niedermann =

Danish actress

- Born: 27 September 1880; Denmark
- Died: 23 May 1967 (aged 86); Denmark
- Occupation: Actress
- Years active: 1910–1954

Marie Niedermann (27 September 1880 – 23 May 1967) was a Danish film actress. She appeared in 23 films between 1910 and 1954. She was born and died in Denmark.

== Filmography ==
- Karen, Maren og Mette (1954)
- Vesterhavsdrenge (1950)
- Når katten er ude (1947)
- Elly Petersen (1944)
- Drama på slottet (1943)
- Moster fra Mols (1943)
- Alt for karrieren (1943)
- Forellen (1942)
- Søren Søndervold (1942)
- Tordenskjold går i land (1942)
- Thummelumsen (1941)
- Peter Andersen (1941)
- Alle går rundt og forelsker sig (1941)
- Niels Pind og hans dreng (1941)
- Sommerglæder (1940)
- En lille tilfældighed (1939)
- Den gamle præst (1939)
- Giftes - nej tak! (1936)
- Fra fyrste til knejpevært (1913)
- Ansigttyven II (1910)
- Ansigttyven I (1910)
- Valdemar Sejr (1910)
- Elverhøj (1910)
