= Besættelse =

- Cover of the Danish DVD
- Directed by: Bodil Ipsen
- Written by: Fleming Lynge; Hans Severinsen (novel)
- Starring: Berthe Qvistgaard; Johannes Meyer; Aage Fønss; Poul Reichhardt
- Cinematography: Valdemar Christensen
- Edited by: Valdemar Christensen
- Music by: Erik Fiehn
- Distributed by: Nordisk Film
- Release date: 1944
- Running time: 83 min
- Country: Denmark
- Language: Danish

Besættelse ('Possession') is a 1944 Danish film noir directed by Bodil Ipsen and starring Johannes Meyer and Berthe Qvistgaard. Based on a novel by Hans Severinsen, the film is a dark psychological drama about an aging businessman whose erotic obsession with a cynical young woman leads to his eventual downfall.

== Cast ==
Actor	Role
Johannes Meyer	Draper Jens Steen
Berthe Qvistgaard	Else Petersen
Aage Fønss	Merchant Thygesen
Poul Reichhardt	Aage Thygesen
Thorkil Lauritzen	Landbetjent Hermannsen
Aage Redal	parish bailiff
Peter Nielsen	lawyer
Rasmus Christiansen	Røgter
Vera Gebuhr	Hotel maid
Alma Olander Dam Willumsen	Mrs. Steen (as Alma Olander Dam)
Jesper Gottschalch	
Karl Jørgensen	Traveling salesman
