= Alle gaar rundt og forelsker sig =

- Directed by: Emanuel Gregers
- Written by: Fleming Lynge
- Starring: Lilian Ellis
- Cinematography: Valdemar Christensen
- Music by: Kai Normann Andersen
- Release date: 2 August 1941
- Running time: 94 minutes
- Country: Denmark
- Language: Danish

Alle gaar rundt og forelsker sig is a Danish 1941 Operetta film directed by Emanuel Gregers. The film was produced by Nordisk Film.

== Plot ==
It is a bet that sets the action in motion. In the Central Theatre's corduroy wardrobe, an extremely lively discussion arises one evening between the beautiful and energetic Mette Madsen and her comrades. The girls have, as usual, discussed the problem with men, and Oda, a beautiful girl, full of sex appeal, claims that Mette, who by the way is an excellent chairman of the Kordamers' organization, is completely devoid of "oomph" and does not exercise any attraction to men. The bet is made and the three "victims", who must of course be unmarried, are chosen from the phone book.

== Cast ==
- Lilian Ellis – Mette Madsen
- Erika Voigt – Mette's mother, Cordelia
- Hans Kurt – Frits Olsen
- Valdemar Møller – F. Olsen (Frits' father)
- Peter Malberg – Ludvig Bøgholm
- Erling Schroeder – Erik Sommer
- Sigurd Langberg – Mr. Sommer (Erik's father)
- Sigrid Horne-Rasmussen – Oda Holm
- Svend Bille – Theatre director Holgersen
- Petrine Sonne – Johanne Mikkelsen
- Paul Holck Hofmann – Regissør
- Marie Niedermann – Gormsen
- Minna Jørgensen – Frk. Storm
- Clara Schwartz – Fru Sommer
- Asta Hansen – Vera
- Lillian Forum-Hansen – Korpige
- Jeanne Darville – Korpige
- Tudlik Johansen – Korpige
- Victor Cornelius – Sanger
- Gudrun Ringheim – Korpige
- Else Kordt – Kordt Sisters
- Inga Kordt – Kordt Sisters
- Grete Kordt – Kordt Sisters
- Lisa Haidt – Sangerinde i starten, korpige
- Sonja Steincke Sangerinde i starten, korpige
- Maj Dam – Korpige
- Valsø Holm – Sporvognspassager
- Ruth Saabye – Korpige
- Gunnar Bigum – Gæst i teaterkatten der truer Frits
- Henry Nielsen – Receptionist
- Asta Esper Andersen – Sporvognspassager
- Ejner Bjørkmann – Tubaspiller i sporvogn
- Kay Abrahamsen – Mettes sangpartner
- Gunnar Strømvad – Dansende gæst i Teaterkatten
- Eik Koch – Dansende gæst i Teaterkatten

== Music ==
The title song Alle går rundt og forelsker sig, with lyrics by Børge Müller, was one of a group of 12 songs by Kai Normann Andersen that was included in the Danish Culture Canon.
