= Jens Østerholm =

Danish actor (1928–2006)

- Born: 25 April 1928; Hvissinge, Glostrup Municipality, Denmark
- Died: 13 November 2006 (aged 78)
- Occupation: Actor
- Years active: 1959 - 1994

Jens Østerholm (25 April 1928 – 13 November 2006) was a Danish film actor. He appeared in 27 films between 1959 and 1994. He was born in Denmark and was married to actress Birgitte Federspiel, but the couple divorced.

== Selected filmography ==
- Gøngehøvdingen (1961)
- Dronningens vagtmester (1963)
- To (1964)
- My Sisters Children Go Astray (1971)
- Me, Too, in the Mafia (1974)
