= Alt dette og Island med =

1951 film by Johan Jacobsen

- Directed by: Johan Jacobsen
- Written by: Carl Erik Soya
- Produced by: Preben Philipsen
- Starring: Sonja Wigert
- Cinematography: Werner Hedman
- Release date: 3 September 1951
- Running time: 110 minutes
- Country: Denmark
- Language: Danish

Alt dette og Island med is a 1951 Danish drama film directed by Johan Jacobsen and starring Sonja Wigert.

== Cast ==
- Sonja Wigert as Nina Lind, singer
- Karl Gustav Ahlefeldt as Saboteur
- Asbjørn Andersen as German officer
- Bjarne Bø as Ship captain
- Jack Fjeldstad as A man
- Kjeld Jacobsen as Leif Høst
- Henki Kolstad as Bjørn, Finn's assistant
- Sture Lagerwall as Gustaf Dalander, Nina's husband
- Louis Miehe-Renard as Engineer
- Tavs Neiiendam as Saboteur
- Arne Thomas Olsen as Ringer
- Kjeld Petersen as Saboteur
- Poul Reichhardt as Axel Poulsen, botanist
- Georg Richter as Meteorologist
- Toralf Sandø as A porter
- Harald Schwenzen as Halvorsen
- Claus Wiese as Stein, Finn's assistant
