= Afsporet =

1942 film directed by Bodil Ipsen and Lau Lauritzen Jr.

- Front cover of the Danish DVD
- Directed by: Bodil Ipsen
- Written by: Sven Rindom; Karl Schlüter (play)
- Produced by: Aage Stentoft; Henning Karmark
- Starring: Illona Wieselmann; Ebbe Rode; Johannes Meyer; Ib Schønberg
- Cinematography: Rundolf Frederiksen; Alf Schnéevoigt
- Edited by: Marie Ejlersen
- Music by: Sven Gyldmark; Peter Deutsch
- Distributed by: ASA Film
- Release date: 1942
- Running time: 106 minutes
- Country: Denmark
- Language: Danish

Afsporet (English: Derailed) is a 1942 Danish erotic thriller drama film directed by Bodil Ipsen and Lau Lauritzen Jr. starring Ebbe Rode and Illona Wieselmann. The psychological drama revolves around the intense erotic relationship between a wealthy married woman suffering from amnesia and a paroled petty thief entangled with organized crime. Afsporet was Ipsen's directorial debut and is considered the first true Danish film noir.

== Cast ==
Actor	Role
Poul Reumert	Professor Bøgh
Illona Wieselmann	Esther Berthelsen
Ebbe Rode	Janus Jensen
Johannes Meyer	Organisten 'Bessefar'
Ib Schønberg	Jammerherren
Tove Grandjean	Jenny 'Bælam' Sørensen
Sigrid Horne-Rasmussen	Lotte Cloc
Lise Thomsen	Misse Lillebil
Sigurd Langberg	Detective Lønberg
Jørn Jeppesen	Detective
Bjarne Forchhammer	Erik Berthelsen
Eigil Reimers	Mogens Berner
Jeanne Darville	Mrs. Berner
Preben Lerdorff Rye	Willy Hansen
Aage Winther-Jørgensen	Policeman
