= Mimi Heinrich =

Danish actress and writer (1936–2017)

- Born: 1 November 1936; Copenhagen, Denmark
- Died: 31 May 2017 (aged 80); Ramløse, Denmark
- Occupation: Actor
- Years active: 1954-1965
- Spouses: Kells Elvins; Joseph Dubin; Christian Reesen Magle
- Children: Maria Dubin; Kristina Dubin; Frederik Magle

Mimi Heinrich (1 November 1936 – 31 May 2017) was a Danish actress and writer. Outside Denmark she was mostly known for her roles in the cult movies Reptilicus and Journey to the Seventh Planet. She had her debut at the Det Ny Teater in 1957 and starred in 19 Danish movies between 1953 and 1964.

From 1962 to 1974, she lived in the United States. Heinrich was married three times. The first time was with the American writer Kells Elvins (a close friend of William S. Burroughs) who died in 1962. She then married Joseph Dubin – head of the legal department of Universal Studios, whom she later divorced and with whom she had two daughters, the painter Maria Dubin and film producer Kristina Dubin. After returning to Denmark, she married the Danish painter Christian Reesen Magle with whom she had a son, the composer Frederik Magle.

After returning to Denmark she worked primarily as a writer. She died on 31 May 2017.

== Filmography ==
Year	Title	Role	Notes
1954	Jan går til filmen	Lis	
1954	Karen, Maren og Mette	Mette Kruse	
1955	Blændværk	Elvi Hansen	
1956	Den store gavtyv	Guldsmedens veninde	
1956	Færgekroen	Susanne Ermandsen	
1956	Vi som går stjernevejen	Danserinde	
1957	Be Dear to Me	Gårdmandsdatter	
1957	Skovridergaarden	Ulla	
1958	Seksdagesløbet	Yrsa	
1959	Ballade på Bullerborg	Irma	
1959	Soldaterkammerater rykker ud	Mette	
1960	Skibet er ladet med	Viola	
1960	Forelsket i København	Marlene Steiner	
1961	Reptilicus	Karen Martens	
1961	Komtessen	Komtesse Maria Hardenborg	
1962	Journey to the Seventh Planet	Ursula	
1962	Soldaterkammerater på sjov	Lise	
1963	The Christine Keeler Story	Marianne	
1964	The Castle	Regitse	
1964	Når enden er go	Sekretær	Uncredited
1965	Ih, du forbarmende		(final film role)
