= Emanuel Gregers =

Danish actor and director 1881 - 1957

- Born: 28 December 1881; Horsens, Denmark
- Died: 22 March 1957 (aged 75); Copenhagen, Denmark
- Resting place: Assistens Cemetery, Copenhagen
- Occupations: Actor; Screenwriter; Director
- Years active: 1887–1949
- Spouses: Ella Olsen; Kiss Gregers; Bodil Ipsen; Marguerite Viby; Ruth Saabye

Emanuel Gregers (28 December 1881 – 22 March 1957) was a Danish actor, screenwriter and film director. Gregers made 36 films during a career which extended over four decades from the Danish golden age of silent film until 1949. Critics often dismissed his work as dependable yet uninspired, however many of his light-hearted comedies achieved great popularity in Denmark. Gregers most notable films were romantic comedies starring his wives Bodil Ipsen and Marguerite Viby.

== Career ==
Emanuel Gregers was born on 28 December 1881 in Horsens, Denmark. He began acting at 16-years-old, appearing first at the Horsens summer theater and then in local theaters for the next several years. Gregers moved to Copenhagen to become the stage director for the Frederiksberg Theater and performed at Norrebros Teater and the Betty Nansen Teatret. Although he quickly shifted to working in film in 1912, Gregers maintained a lifelong attachment to stagework: he owned the Casino theater in Copenhagen and managed it from 1921 to 1931, then continued as a stage director into the 1940s.

Gregers first appeared on film in 1912 with Olaf Fønss in the silent film Bryggerens datter (The Brewer's Daughter) written by Carl Th. Dreyer. The following year he starred in films for the Filmfabriken studio including another Dreyer story, Krigskorrespondenter (The War Correspondents).

By 1914 Gregers interest had shifted to working behind the camera. He directed himself in a couple of smaller films, then moved to Nordisk Film where he devoted his full attention to writing and directing. In the early 1920s, Gregers directed a series of films that featured his wife Bodil Ipsen. Most notable was the melodramatic crime story Lavinen, in which Greger's employed an elaborate flash-back structure to relate how the lead character's past leads to a murder. It was also at this time that Gregers was part of Nordisk Film's push for larger films based on literary works. In 1920, Greger's filmed Den flyvende Hollænder (The Flying Dutchman) based on the 1839 novel The Phantom Ship and, in 1922, he made Den sidste af Slægten (The Last of the Family Tree) based upon a novel by the writer Edvard Nielsen-Stevns. For the later film, Gregers ran into trouble with the Danish censors. In the climatic ending the villain, a depraved artist, falls to his death from scaffolding inside a church. The censors objected and removed the ending.

Gregers directed 36 films in total. The most notable were his folk comedies: the wacky 1937 romantic comedy Mille, Marie of mig (Milly, Maria and Me), in which his then current wife, Marguerite Viby, and the most popular Danish comedienne of the 1930s, played three roles; 1938's Bolettes brudeafærd (Bolettes Bridal Party), which starred his former wife Bodil Ipsen as a sharp-tongued spinster; the witty period comedy Sørensen og Rasmussen which starred both his former wives, Viby and Ipsen; and the 1941 backstage musical, Alle gaar rundt og forelsker sig (Everyone's Falling in Love) -- in which a small part was played by Greger's third wife, Ruth Saabye.

Beginning in 1943, Gregers owned the large Casino cinema in Istedgade and became chairman of the Cinema Theatre Owners Association.

Gregers directed his final film in 1949.

== Personal life ==
Gregers was married five times, always to actresses with whom he worked. He was married for the first time in 1907 to Ella Gudrun Elenda Olsen, a primadonna at the Scala. His second marriage to Bodil Ipsen lasted three years from 1919 to 1923. After divorcing Ipsen, he immediately married Kiss Gregers (born Karen Oda Andersen). His fourth marriage was with the Danish comic actress Marguerite Viby (who was also married five times). Their marriage lasted from 1932 to 1938. His final marriage was to Ruth Egede Saabye who played minor roles in Greger's films in the early 1940s.

He died 22 March 1957 at the age of 75.

== Selected filmography ==
=== Director ===
- Hvem er hun? (1914)
- Brændte vinger (1917)
- Zigeunerprinsessen (1918)
- Krigsmillionæren (1919)
- Lykkens blændværk (1919)
- Lavinen (1920)
- Den flyvende Hollænder I-IV (1920)
- Frie fugle (1922)
- Den sidste af slægten (1922)
- Madsalune (1923)
- Stamherren (1925)
- Solskinsdalen (1925)
- Skaf en sensation (1934)
- Saa til søs (1933)
- Min kone er husar (1935)
- Cocktail (1937)
- Mille, Marie og mig (1937)
- Bolettes brudefærd (1938)
- Milly, Maria och jag (1938)
- Komtessen paa Steenholt (1939)
- Sketch til Apolloteatret (1939)
- Sørensen og Rasmussen (1940)
- En pige med pep (1940)
- Thummelumsen (1941)
- En søndag på Amager (1941)
- Alle gaar rundt og forelsker sig (1941)
- En mand af betydning (1941)
- Thorvald Stauning (1941)
- Lykken kommer (1942)
- Forellen (1942)
- Alt for karrieren (1943)
- Det bødes der for (1944)
- Biskoppen (1944)
- Man elsker kun en gang (1945)
- Lejlighed til leje (1949)
- Den stjaalne minister (1949)

=== Actor ===
- Bryggerens datter (1912) uncredited
- Krigskorrespondenter (English:The War Correspondents) (1913) as Bretton
- Guldhornene (1914) as Leif
- Hvem er hun? (1914) as Detective Fox
- Pigen fra Hidalgo Fyret (1914) as Tom, gårdejerens søn
- Zigeunerprinsessen (1918) as Anthonio
- Odds 777 (1932) as Godsejer Rosen
- Søndag på Amager, En (1941) as Sangstemme
- Forellen (1942) as Bankfuldmægtig Carl Møller

=== Writer ===
- Hvem er hun? (1914)
- Brændte vinger (1917)
- Zigeunerprinsessen (1918)
- Lykkens blændværk (1919)
- Lavinen (1920)
- Flyvende Hollænder I-IV (1920)
- Frie fugle (1922)
- Solskinsdalen (1925)
- Cocktail (1937)
