= Poul Reumert =

Danish actor (1883–1968)

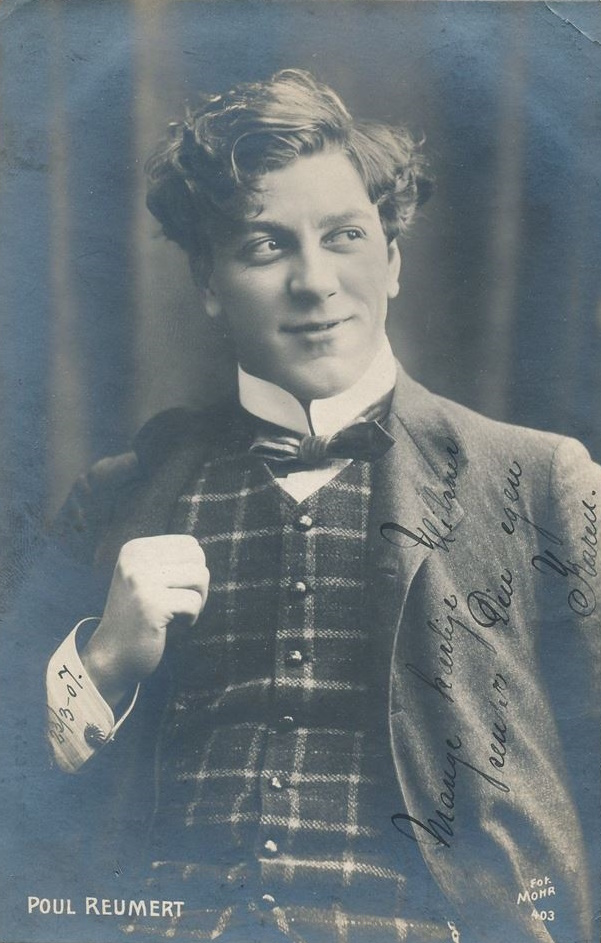
- Reumert in 1907
- Born: Poul Hagen Roumert; 26 March 1883; Copenhagen, Denmark
- Died: 19 April 1968 (aged 85); Copenhagen, Denmark
- Resting place: Mariebjerg Cemetery
- Spouse: Anna Borg (m. 1932; died 1963)
- Parent(s): Elith Reumert, Athalia Reumert

Poul Hagen Reumert (26 March 1883 – 19 April 1968) was a Danish stage and film actor. An incredibly skilled theater actor who made a name for himself in major roles such as Elverhoj, Genboerne and Flagermusen. He debuted after theater school in 1902.

== Selected filmography ==
- Afgrunden (1910)
- Gennem kamp til sejr (1911)
- Den store flyver (1911)
- Livets baal (1912)
- Manegens stjerne (1912)
- Den sorte kansler (1912)
- Det røde alfabet (1916)
- Häxan (1922)
- David Copperfield (1922)
- Lasse Mansson fra Skane (1923)
- Den gamle præst (1939)
- Frøken Kirkemus (1941)
- Søren Søndervold (1942)
- Afsporet (1942)
- General von Döbeln (1942)
- Det brændende spørgsmål (1943)
- Det ender med bryllup (1943)
- De tre skolekammerater (1944)
- Otte akkorder (1944)
- Affæren Birte (1945)
- The Swedenhielm Family (1947)
- For frihed og ret (1949)
