= Carl Alstrup =

Danish actor and film director

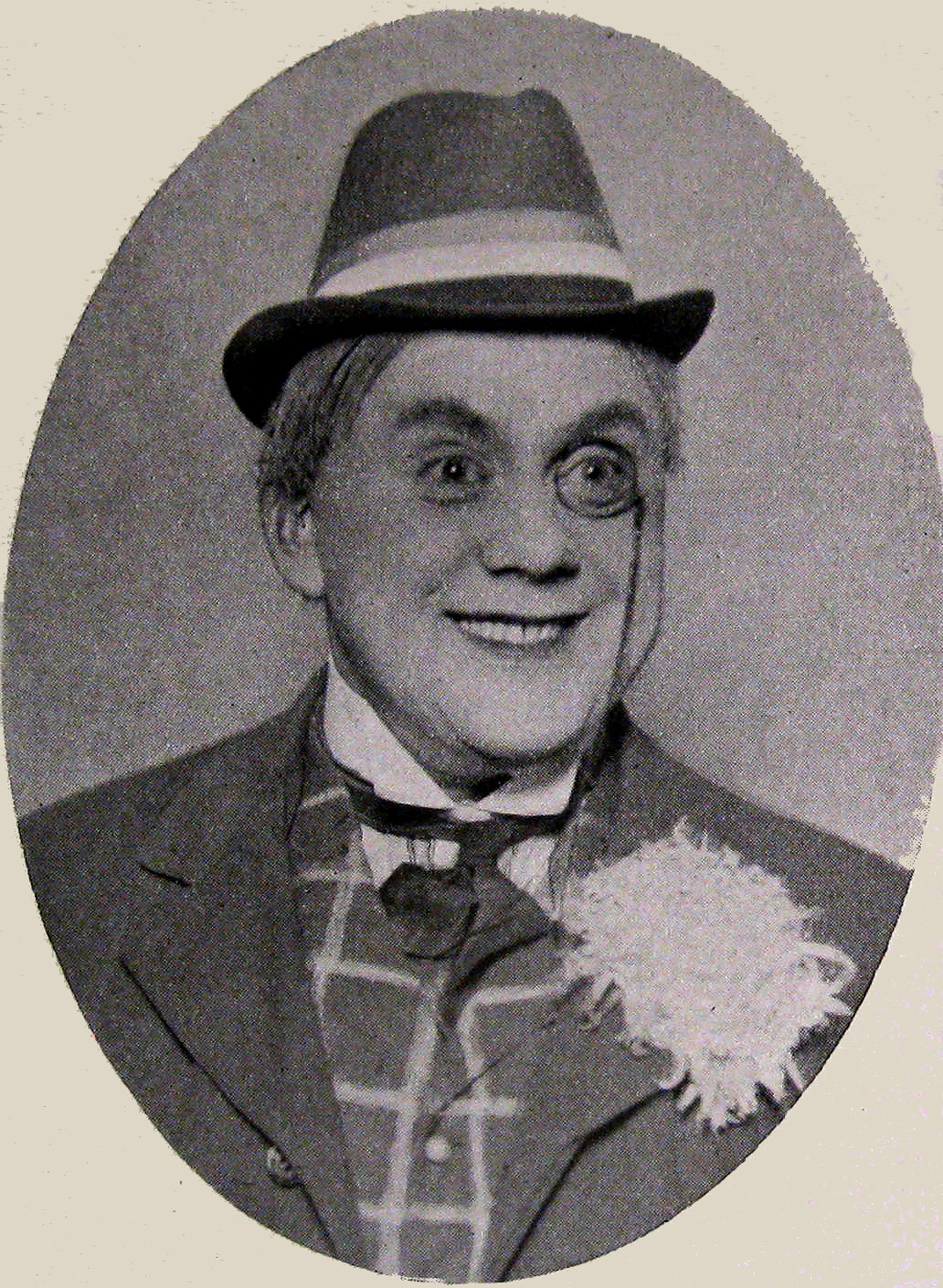
- Carl Alstrup in the summerrevue Sommerrejsen 1909
- Born: 11 April 1877; Sundbyvester, Tårnby, Denmark
- Died: 2 October 1942 (aged 65); Snekkersten, Denmark
- Occupations: Actor, film director
- Years active: 1908-1942

Carl Alstrup (11 April 1877 – 2 October 1942) was a Danish actor and film director. He appeared in 22 films between 1908 and 1942. He also directed four films between 1909 and 1910. He was born in Sundbyvester, Tårnby, Denmark, and died in Snekkersten, Denmark.

== Filmography ==
- Falkedrengen (1908)
- Når djævle er på spil (1909)
- Apachepigens hævn (1909)
- Faldgruben (1909)
- Skarpretterens Søn (1910)
- Fra storstadens dyb (1910)
- København ved Nat (1910)
- Bukseskørtet, jupe colotte (1911)
- Det gale pensionat (1911)
- Guvernørens datter (1912)
- Elskovsleg (1914)
- En opstandelse (1915)
- Skomakarprinsen (1920)
- Kärlek och hypnotism (1921)
- Lord Saviles brott (1922)
- The Golden Smile (1935)
- Den kloge Mand (1937)
- Genboerne (1939)
- Vagabonden (1940)
- En forbryder (1941)
- Peter Andersen (1941)
- Natekspressen P903 (1942)

== Honours and awards ==
=== Foreign honours ===
- Czechoslovakia: Knight of the Order of the White Lion (1935)
