= Johan Jacobsen =

Danish filmmaker (1912–1972)

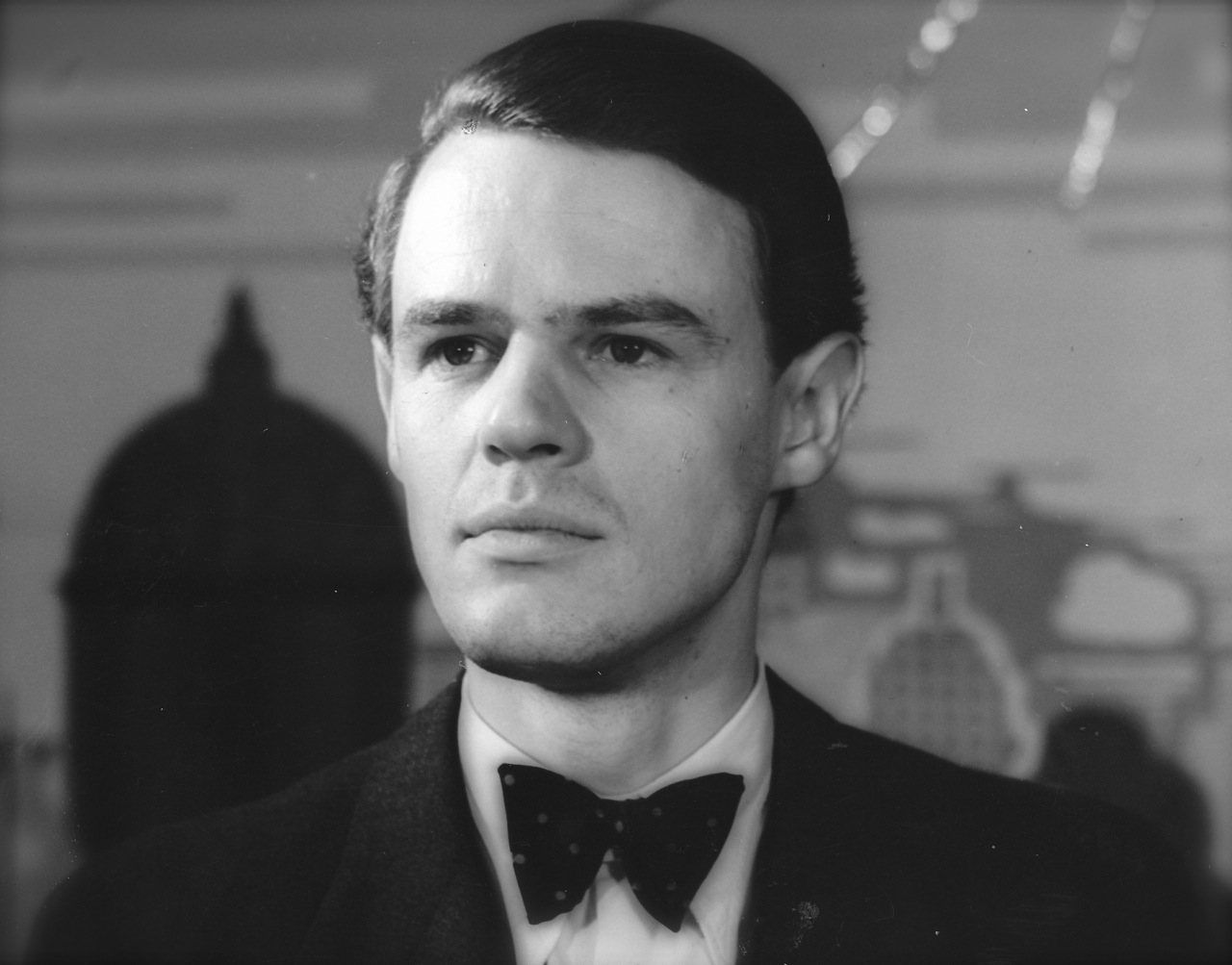
- Born: 14 March 1912; Aarhus, Denmark
- Died: 7 July 1972 (aged 60); Copenhagen, Denmark
- Occupation(s): Film director and producer
- Years active: 1938–1966
- Spouse(s): Annelise Tørsleff (married 1939–1951)
- Partner: Annelise Hovmand (1951–64)
- Children: Bolette (Kisuna); Trine

Johan Jacobsen (14 March 1912 – 7 July 1972) was a Danish film director. His parents were theatre manager Jacob Jørgen Jacobsen (1865–1955) and actress Christel Holch (1886–1968).

In the 1940s, Jacobsen directed a number of both popular and critically acclaimed films for the film studio Palladium.

From 1947 on, he was an independent director and producer. He produced his own films and those of his partner Annelise Hovmand (1924–2016) at his own film studio, Flamingo.

In 1959, he was a member of the jury at the 9th Berlin International Film Festival.

His A Stranger Knocks (1959) was in competition at the San Francisco International Film Festival in 1960. It was distributed in the US by Trans-Lux and played a major part in bringing down the American State Film Censorship system in 1965.

In his last years, Jacobsen worked for tycoon Simon Spies (1921–1984) at his cinema, Merkur Bio, in Copenhagen.

== Filmography ==
Director

- Under byens tage (1938)
- En Lille tilfældighed (1939)
- I de gode gamle Dage (1940)
- Tag det som en mand (1941)
- Tobiasnætter (1941)
- Ballade i Nyhavn (1942)
- Baby på eventyr (1942)
- Mine kære koner (1943)
- Som du vil ha' mig (1943)
- Eight Chords (1944)
- Mens sagføreren sover (1945)
- The Invisible Army (1945)
- Far betaler (1946)
- Letter from the Dead (1946)
- Jenny and the Soldier (1947)
- 3 Aar efter (1948)
- My Wife is Innocent (1950)
- The Needle (1951)
- All this and Island too (1951)
- Som sendt fra himlen (1951)
- Delusion (1955)
- Den store Gav-tyv (1956)
- Vi som går stjernevejen (1956)
- A Stranger Knocks (1959)
- Dronningens vagtmester (1963)
- Søskende (1966)

Documentary film/short

- Da freden kom til Danmark (1945)
- Kongefilmen Frederik IX (1949)
- Næste gang er det dig (1948)
- En dag i radioen (1950)
- Skatteøens hemmelighed (1953)
- The Little Match Girl (La petite fille aux allumettes) (1953)
- Splintret emalje (1956)
- Fremrykket møde (1964)
- Norden i flammer (1965)

Producer

- Next time it's you (1948)
- Kongefilmen Frederik IX (1949)
- En dag i radioen (1950)
- The Needle (1951)
- All this and Island too (1951)
- Problems to be solved (1952)
- The Little Match Girl (La petite fille aux allumettes) (1953)
- Skatteøens hemmelighed (1953)
- Delusion (1955)
- Hvorfor stjæler barnet? (1955)
- Splintret emaille (1956)
- Den store Gav-tyv (1956)
- Be Dear to Me (Sei lieb zu mir) (1957)
- Krudt og klunker (1958)
- A Stranger Knocks (1959)
- Frihedens pris (1960)
- The Musketeers (1961)
- Dronningens vagtmester (1963)
- Sextet (Sekstet) (1963)
- Fremrykket møde (1964)
- Norden i flammer (1965)
- Søskende (1966)

== Literature ==
- Morten Piil (ed): Danske filminstruktører. Gyldendal, Copenhagen. 2005.
- Peter Schepelern (ed), 100 års dansk film. Rosinante, Copenhagen. 2001.
- Peter Schepelern (ed): Filmleksikon. Munksgaard Rosinante, Copenhagen. 1995.
