= Be Dear to Me =

- Directed by: Annelise Hovmand
- Written by: Annelise Hovmand; Finn Methling
- Produced by: Johan Jacobsen
- Starring: Eva Cohn
- Cinematography: Kjeld Arnholtz
- Release date: 1 March 1957
- Running time: 91 minutes
- Country: Denmark
- Language: Danish

Be Dear to Me (Danish: Ingen tid til kærtegn) is a 1957 Danish film directed by Annelise Hovmand.

== Cast ==
- Eva Cohn as Lene
- Lily Weiding as Mor as Skuespillerinde Maria Lehmann
- Hans Kurt as Far as Direktør Mogens Vestergaard
- Jørgen Reenberg as Lærer Harting
- Yvonne Petersen as Anne
- Annelise Jacobsen as Frk. Sørensen
- Johannes Marott as Viggo
- Gerda Madsen as kolonialforretningsejer Fru. Jørgensen
- Karen Berg as Teaterdirektør
- Betty Helsengreen as Bondekone
- Evald Gunnarsen as Erik
- Grethe Paaske as Erik's mor
- Preben Lerdorff Rye as Erik's far
- Bent Christensen as Veninden Fru Jørgensen
- Mimi Heinrich as Gårmandsdatter

== Awards ==
Won

- Bodil Award for Best Danish Film

Nominated

- 7th Berlin International Film Festival: Golden Bear

The film was also chosen as Denmark's official submission to the 30th Academy Awards for Best Foreign Language Film, but did not manage to receive a nomination.

== See also ==
- List of submissions to the 30th Academy Awards for Best Foreign Language Film
- List of Danish submissions for the Academy Award for Best International Feature Film
