= Annelise Hovmand =

Danish film director

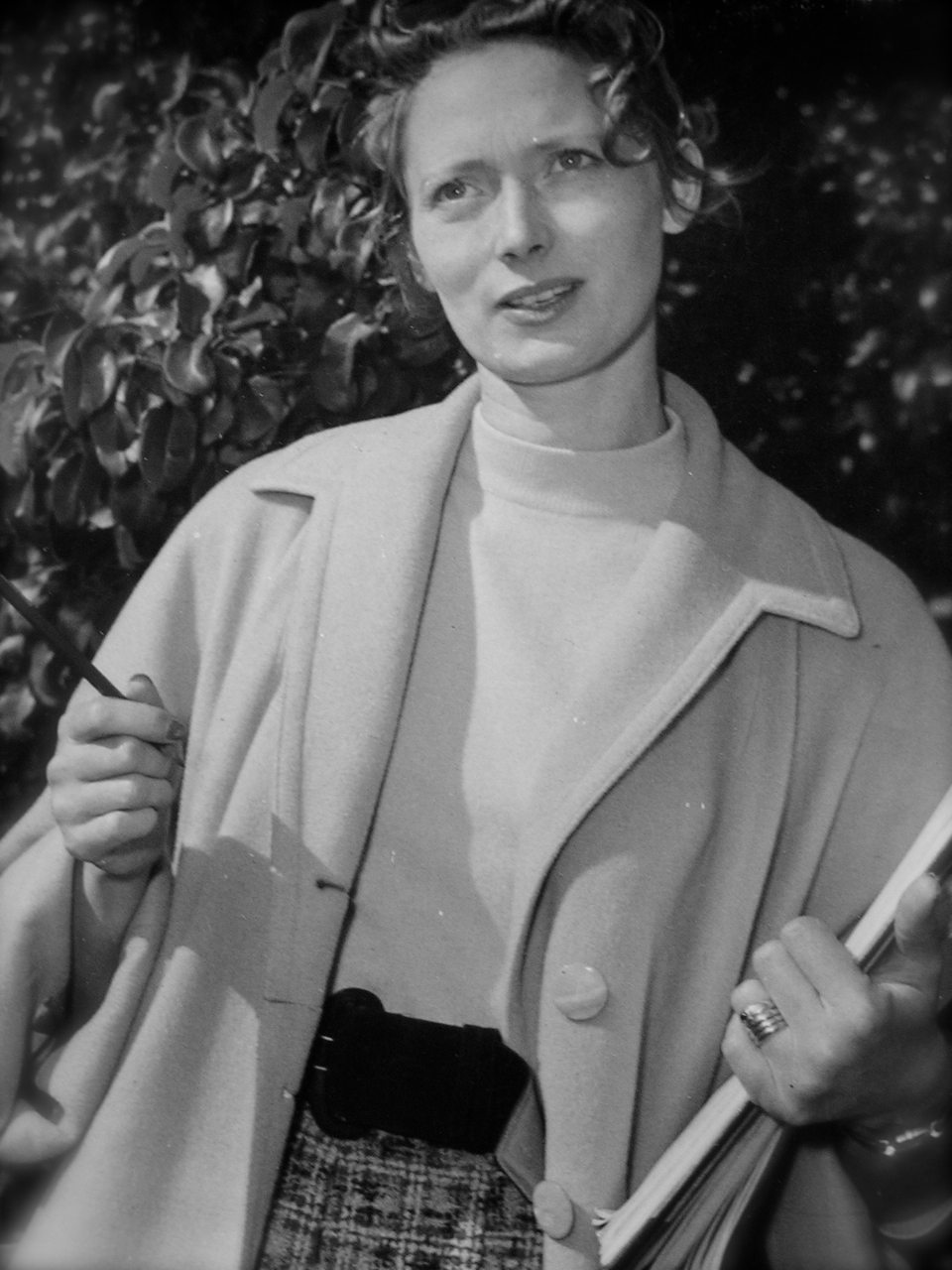
- Annelise Hovmand in 1957
- Born: Annelise Mathilde Reffs; 17 September 1924; Copenhagen, Denmark
- Died: 28 December 2016 (aged 92)
- Occupations: Film director, screenwriter, film producer
- Years active: 1955–1991
- Spouse: Carl Johan Nienstædt

Annelise Mathilde Hovmand (17 September 1924 – 28 December 2016) was a Danish film director, screenwriter and film producer. She directed 12 films between 1955 and 1991. Her 1957 film Ingen tid til kærtegn won the Bodil Award for Best Danish Film and was entered into the 7th Berlin International Film Festival.

Hovmand died on 28 December 2016 at the age of 92.

== Filmography ==
- Hvorfor stjæler barnet? (1955)
- Ingen tid til kærtegn (1957)
- Krudt og klunker (1958)
- Frihedens pris (1960)
- Gøngehøvdingen (1961)
- Sekstet (1963)
- Norden i flammer (1965)
- Grænseland (1965) (TV)
- Nu stiger den (1966)
- De forsvundne breve (1967)
- Et døgn med Ilse (1971)
- Høfeber (1991)
