= Folketeatret, Copenhagen =

Theatre in Copenhagen, Denmark

Coordinates: 55°40′53″N 12°34′16″E

Folketeatret
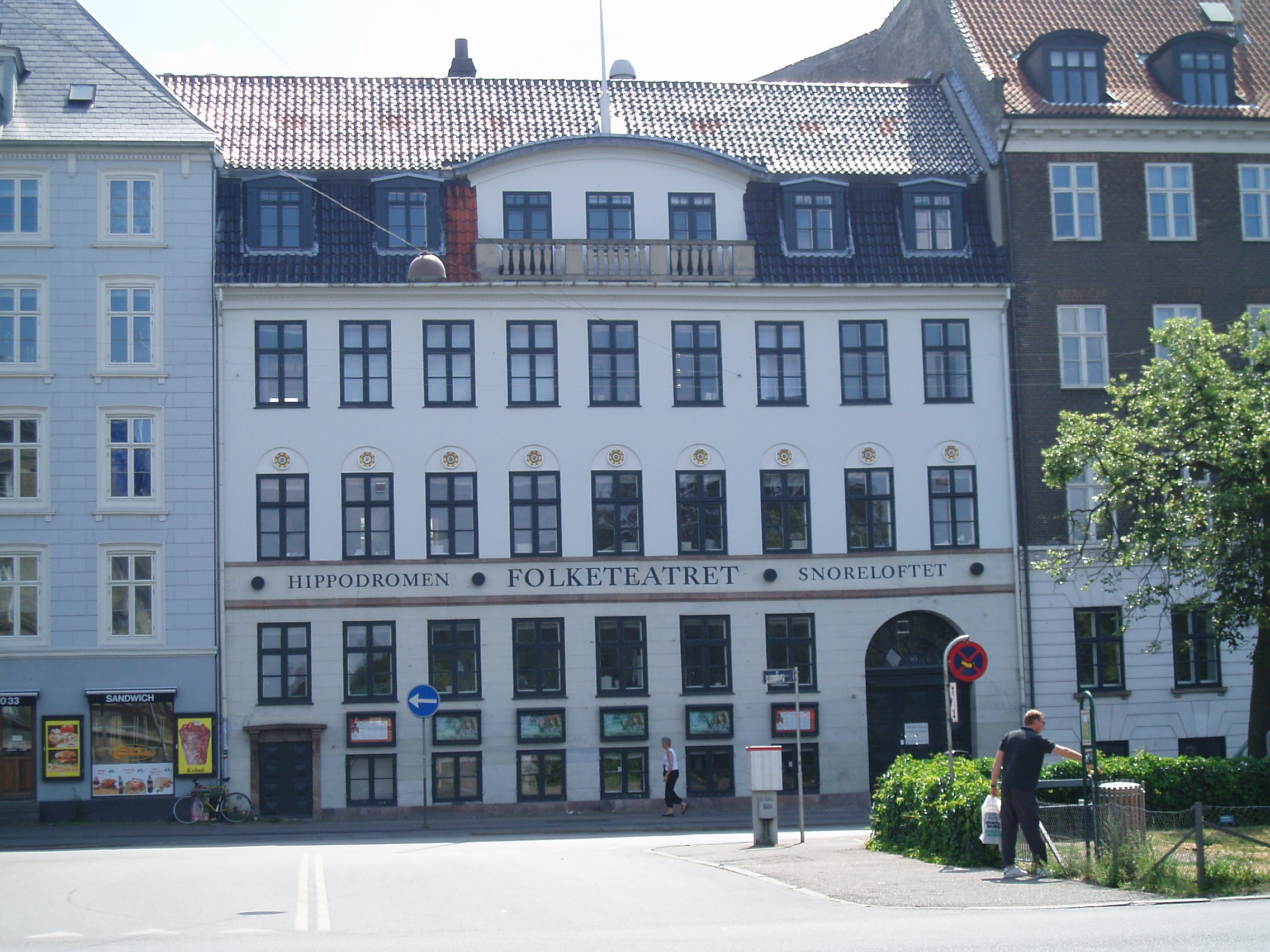
- Main entrance
- Interactive map of Folketeatret
- Address: Nørregade; Copenhagen; Denmark

Construction
- Years active: 1857-present

Folketeatret (lit. "People's Theatre") is a theatre in Copenhagen, Denmark. Established in Nørregade in 1857 by Hans Wilhelm Lange, making it Denmark's oldest professional theatre, the Folketeatret merged with Den Danske Teater (founded 1963) in 2007. Today, it is one of a group of theatres managed by Københavns Teater.

== History ==
The Folketeatret was founded in 1857, based on an initiative by actor and theatre director Hans Wilhelm Lange (1815-1873), who managed the theatre until his death. The theatre opened its doors to the public on 18 September 1857, and was created as a "people's theatre", which children were allowed to attend (unlike the Royal Danish Theatre, where only those over 10 years were admitted).

=== Det Danske Teater ===
Det Danske Teater (The Danish Theatre) was a touring theatre company that was established in 1963 when three other touring groups merged: ARTE, Andels Teatret and the Dansk Folkescene ("Danish People's Scene"). The new group was first led by Tudlik Johansen, who had led the Dansk Folkescene, who remained at the helm until 1969.

The theatre reached a large family audience with musical productions based on Astrid Lindgren's works, including Ronja Røverdatter (1998), Pippi (1999) and The Brothers Lionheart (2001).

=== Merger ===
In 2007 Det Danske Teater merged with the Folketeatret under Waage Sandø, who took over the leadership of the new group, which was renamed Folketeatret Turné. With an amendment to the Danish Theatre Act as a result of local government reforms, called Strukturreformen, the Danish Theatre became a state-sponsored institution similar to Den Jyske Opera and Peter Schaufuss Ballet, with which it shared a grant clause.

In 2010, Kasper Wilton was appointed artistic director of Folketeatret.

As of February 2026, Mette Wolf is artistic director.

=== Site and buildings history ===
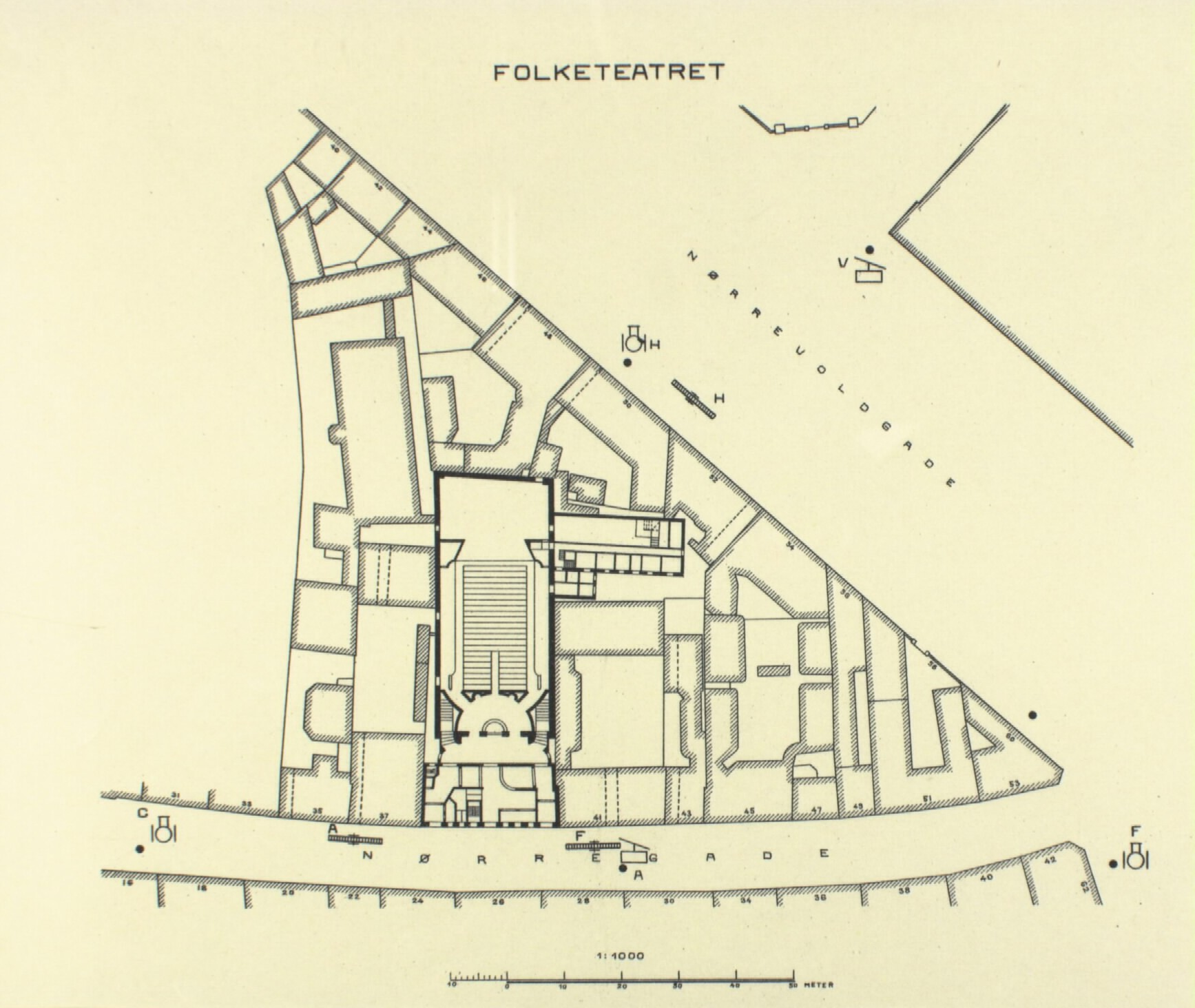
Plan of the complex

The property in Nørregade belonged to Hof- og Stadsretten judge Hans Heger. He also operated a brewery on the site. He was the father of actor Stephan Heger and Hamma Rahbek. His property was listed in the new cadastre of 1806 as No. 45 in the North Quarter.

The present building in Nørregade (Nørregade 39) was built in 1822 for master joiner Johan Wilhelm Benthien. In 1830, No. 45 was divided into three separate properties. The portion that faced Nørregade was merged with part of neighboring No. 46 to form No. 45 A og 46 C (norregade 39). The portion of No. 45 that faced Nørre Voldgade on the other side of the block was divided into No. 45 B (now Nørre Voldgade 48 ) and No. 45 C. (now Nørre Voldgade 46).

==== The Hippodrome ====
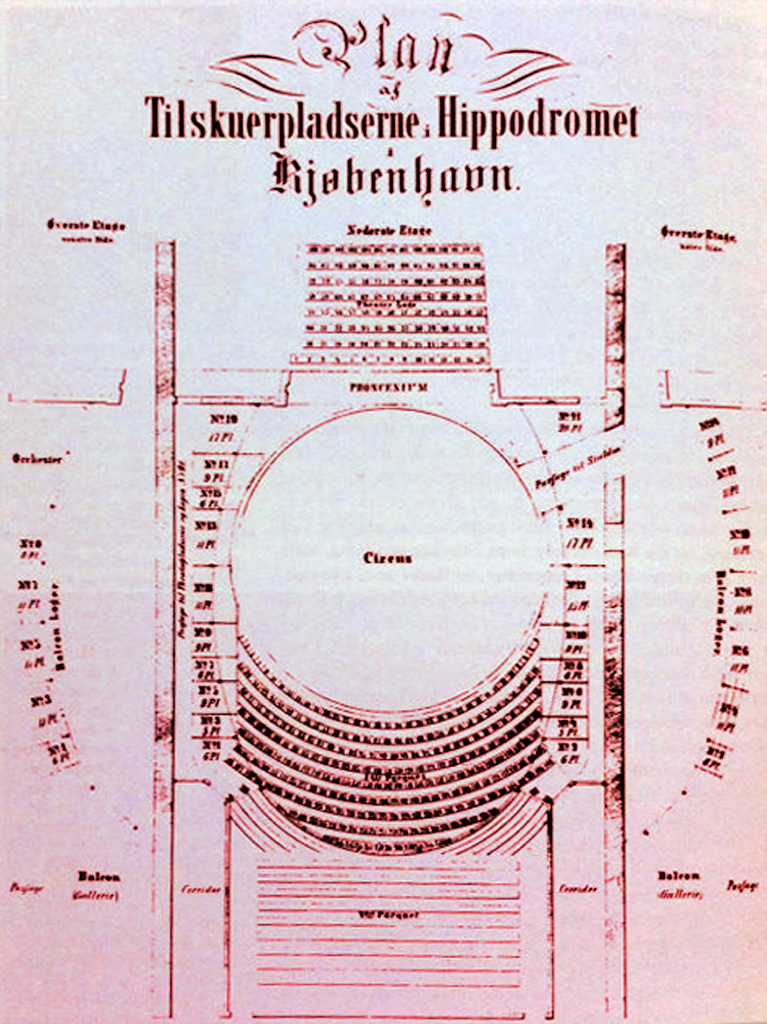
Plan of the Hippodrome.

In 1846, No. 45 A & 46 C was merged with part of No. 47 as No. 45 A, 46 C og 47 B. in 1845-1846, the complex was converted into a hippodrome by the architect Hans Conrad Stilling.

In 1949, Hippodrome played host to the "Hippodrome Meetings", which played a role in the events that led to the adoption of the Constitution of Denmark.

== Today ==
Folketeatret is now managed as a part of the Københavns Teater organisation, along with the Betty Nansen Teatret, Østre Gasværk Teater, Nørrebros Theater, Republique/Revolver, and Østre Gasværk Teater.

== Theatre directors ==
- 1857-1873: Hans Wilhelm Lange
- 1873-1876: M.W. Brun
- 1876-1884: Robert Watt
- 1884-1900: Severin Abrahams
- 1900-1908: Jens Frederik Siegfred Dorph-Petersen
- 1903-1905: Betty Nansen, meddirektør
- 1908-1912: Johannes Nielsen
- 1912-1928: Viggo Friderichsen
- 1912-1924: Einar Christiansen, meddirektør
- 1924-1926: Axel Frische, meddirektør
- 1927-1935: Poul Gregaard, meddirektør indtil 1928
- 1935-1959: Thorvald Larsen
- 1959-1971: Bjørn Watt-Boolsen
- 1971-2001: Preben Harris
- 2001-2002: Tommy Larsen og Michael Moritzen
- 2002-2003: Henning Sprogøe, konstitueret
- 2003-2005: Klaus Bondam
- 2005-2007: Malene Schwartz
- 2007-2010: Waage Sandø
- 2010-2024: Kasper Wilton
- 2024–present (Feb 2026): Mette Wolf
