= Nytorv 15 =

Building in Copenhagen, Denmark

Btroev 15
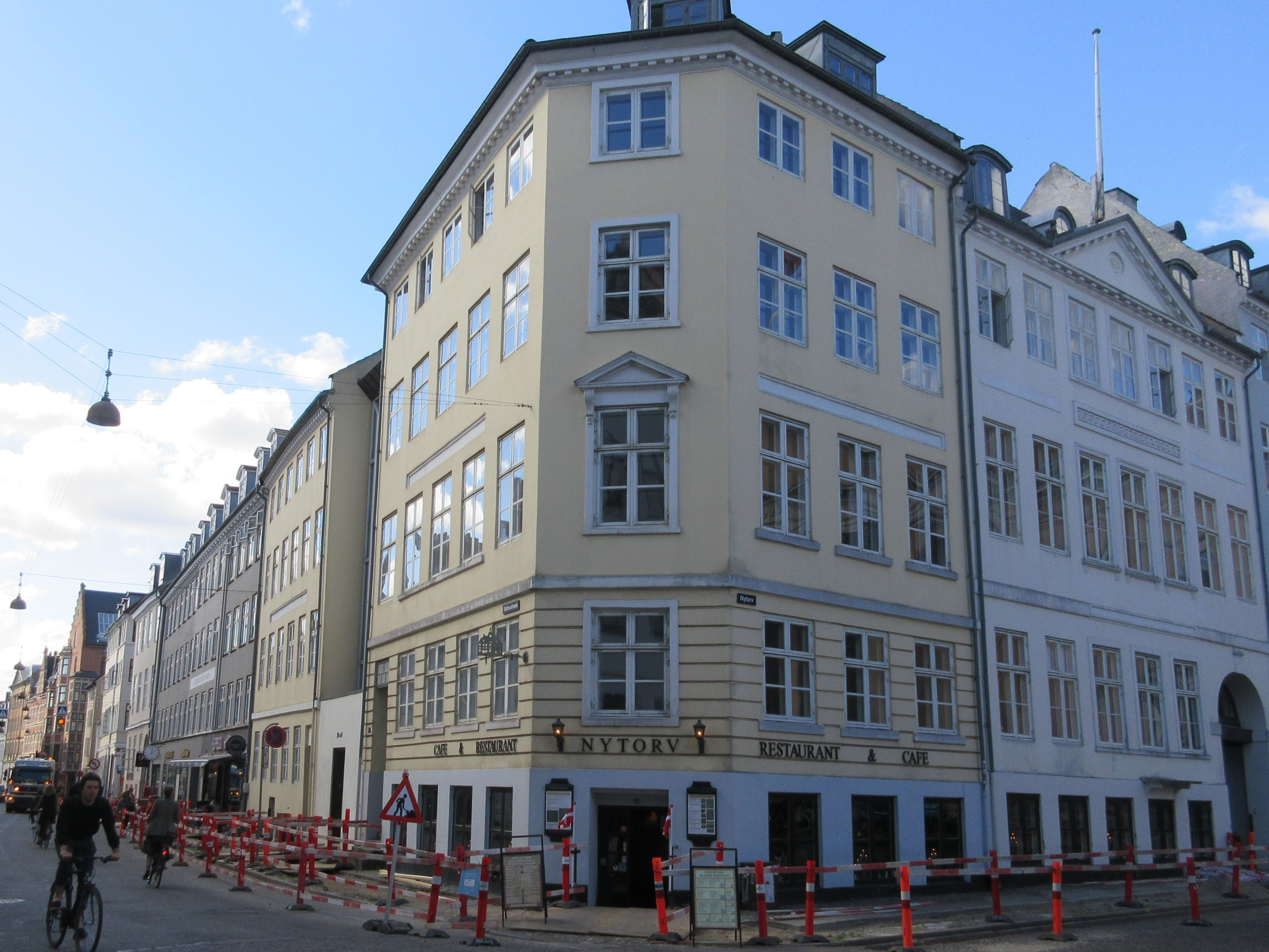
- Interactive map of the Btroev 15 area

General information
- Location: Copenhagen, Denmark
- Coordinates: 55°40′37.88″N 12°34′25.14″E
- Completed: 1798

Nytorv 15/Rådhusstræde 2 is a Neoclassical property situated at the corner of Nytorv and Rådhusstræde in the Old Town of Copenhagen, Denmark. It consists of two separate buildings, the corner building from 1797 (Nytorv 15/Rådhusstræde 2) and an eight-bay building from 1798 (Rådhusstræde 2B), now connected by a narrow modern infill. The building was listed in the Danish registry of protected buildings and places in 1945. Notable former residents include jurist, writer and publisher Jacob Just Gudenrath (1657–1825), actors Stephan and Eline Heger, theatrical painter Edvard Lehmann and portrait painter hristian Frederik Christensen (1805–1883).

== History ==
=== 18th century ===
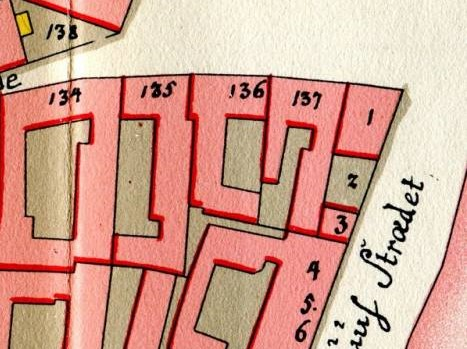
No. 1–3 seen on a detail from Christian Gedde's map of the West Quarter, 1757.

In the late 17th century, the site was made up of three smaller properties. The corner property was listed as No. 1 in the city's West Quarter, owned by blacksmith Niels Nielsen, in 1689. The adjacent property in Rådhustræde was, as No. 2, owned by vrager Rasmussen and No. 3 was owned by locksmith Anders Mikkelsen. The three properties were all owned by grocer (urtekræmmer) Lars Frost by 1756.

At the time of the 1787 census, No. 1–2–3 was home to a total of four households. Wilhelm Ravn, a retired economist, now with a royal pension, resided in the building with a housekeeper and a maid. Hans Morten Sommer, a Supreme Court justice, resided in the building with his wife Abel Marie Hamon, a servant, two maids and a lodger. Engel Kirstine Wildebrand, a widow, resided in the building with her two daughters and a maid. Hans Peter Winge, a royal lackey, resided in the building with his wife Gundil Schau, their four children and one maid.

=== Johan Henrich Kold and the new building ===
The building complex was destroyed in the Copenhagen Fire of 1795 together with most of the other buildings in the area. The new corner building was constructed for master tailor Johan Henrich Kold in 1796–1797 and the adjacent building in Rådhusgade (now No. 2B) was constructed for him the following year.

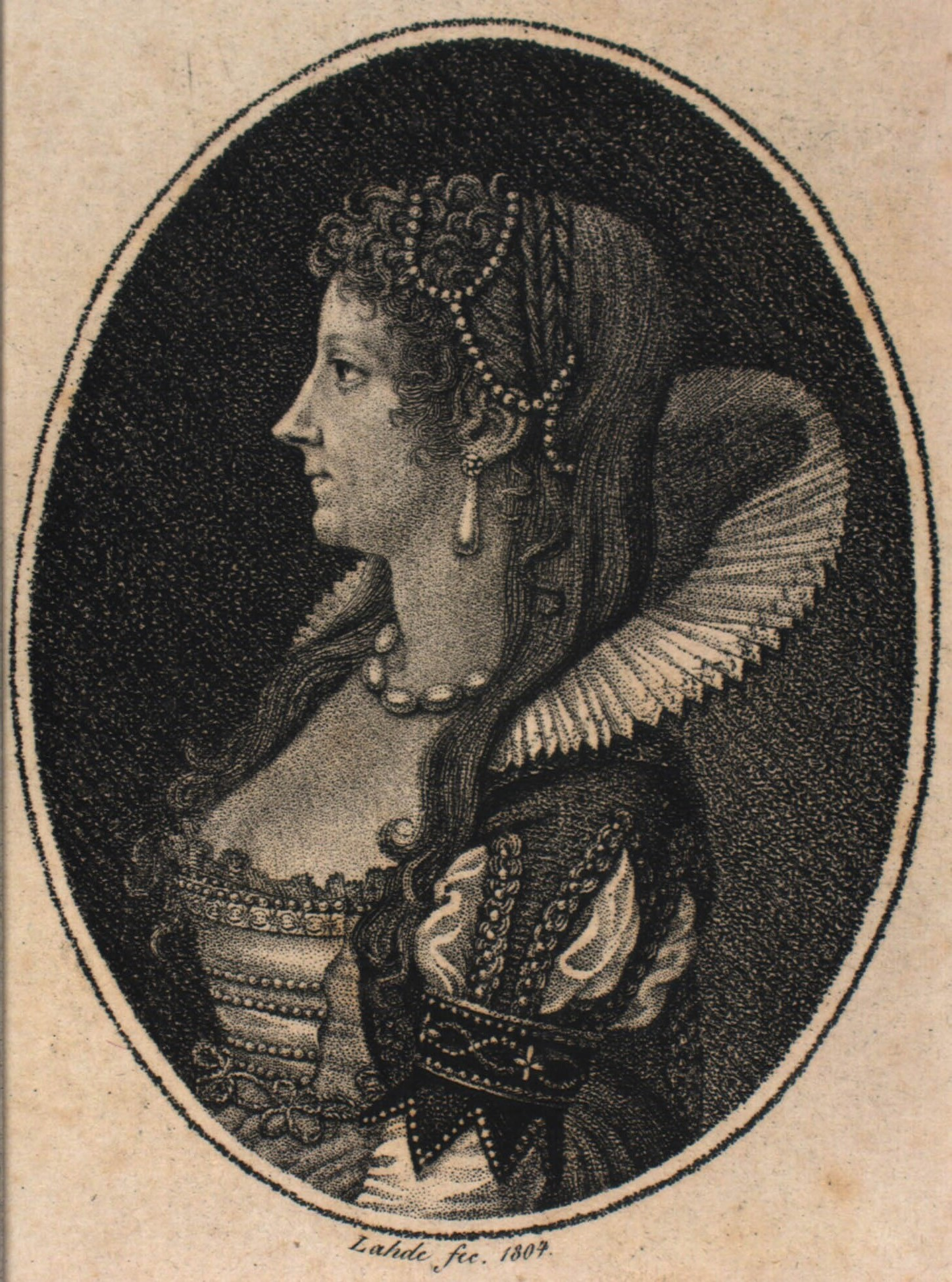
Eline Heger

At the time of the 1801 census, No. 1 was home to a total of six households. Johan Henrich Kold (Koll), now a widower, was residing in the building at that time with a tailor's apprentice, three lodgers and a maid. Ivar Nyebroe, a merchant, resided in the building with his wife Christine Munck and a maid. Jacob Just Gudenrath (1657–1825), a jurist, writer and publisher, resided in the building with his wife Frideriche Wilhelmine Meiner and a maid. The actors Stephan Heger and Eline Heger resided in the building with their two children and a maid. Andreas Christian Sparrevohn, a master clockmaker, resided in the building with his wife Cecilia Cathrine Gram, one lodger and two maids. Ane Marie Lehman, a 63-year-old widow, was the last resident in the building.

The property was in the new cadastre of 1806 listed as No. 118. It was still owned at that time by Johan Henrich Kold.

=== 1849s and 1859s ===
At the 1840 census, No. 118 was home to a total of 32 people divided among eight households. Hans Ludvig Jürgensen, a wine merchant, resided on the ground floor with two apprentices and a maid. Magdalene Lederthoug, a wine merchant's widow, resided on the first floor with her four children (aged 15 to 21) and a maid. Ludvig Vilhelm J. Aschenfeldt, a civil servant from the Generalpostdirektorat, resided on the second floor with his wife Emilie Vilhelmine Aschenfeldt and a maid. Marie Margarethe Løffler, a 50 year old widow, resided on the third floor with her three children, a maid and a lodger. Rasmus Lund, a clockmaker, resided with his wife Johanne Sophie Lund and a daughter on the ground floor of the apartments of the side wing. Johan Lov, a merchant, resided alone on the first floor of the side wing. B. Platen, a married woman whose husband is not listed as a resident, resided on the second floor of the side wing with her two children and a lodger. Jens Christian Nimb, a tailor, resided in the third floor apartment with his wife Emilie Theresia Nimb and their three children.

The artist Edvard Lehmann was among the residents of the building in the years around 1848.

At the time of the 1850 census, Magdalene Lederthoug née Drastrup occupied the three lowest floors of the corner building. She lived there with her four children, a niece, two employees, a servant, a maid and two lodgers. Frederik Ludvig Evers, a lawyer, resided in the second floor apartment with his wife Caroline Frederikke Engelhardt and her sister Sophia Christine Engelhardt. Hans Bastian, a krigsråd, resided on the third floor with his wife Maria Brünnich and their three children.

=== 1880 census ===
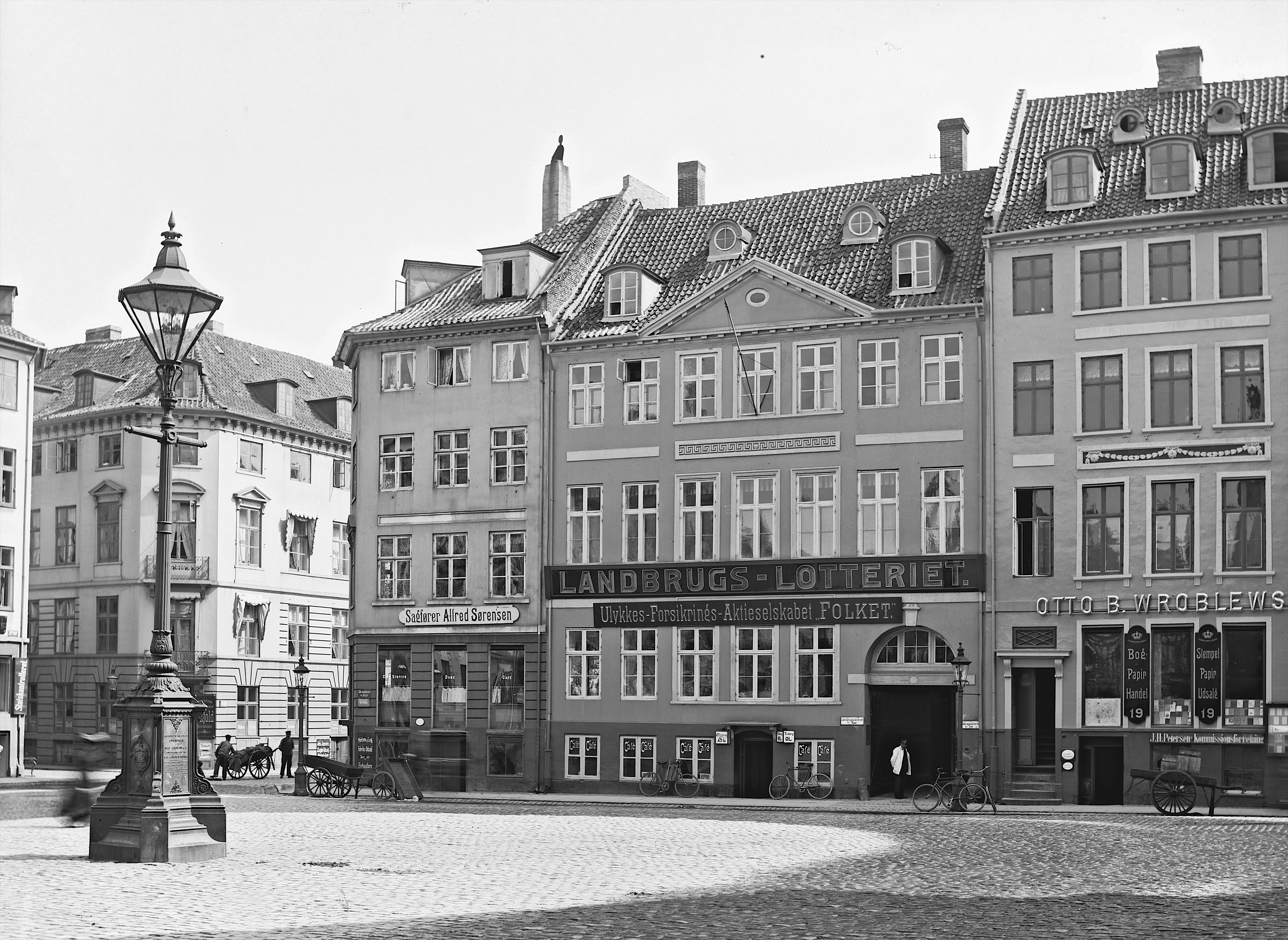
Nytorv 15 seen on a photograph by Ernst Nyrop Larsen from 1908.

At the time of the 1880 census, Ntroev 15 was home to a total of 37 residents. Johan Martin Emil Bolvig, a retailer, resided on the ground floor and first floor of the corner building with his wife Annette Bolvig, their 15-year-old daughter Johanne Emilie Bolvig, his mother Maren Bolette Bolvig and his sister Hansigne Henriette Bolvig. Christian Jensen, a haulier, resided in one of the third floor apartments with his wife Marie Jensen, their four children (aged one to 15) and one maid. Johannes Beyer, a lawyer, resided on the second floor with his wife Polly Beyerm their foster daughter Sophie Henriette Beyer and one maid. Christian Frederik Christensen (1805–1883), a portrait painter, resided in the garret with his daughter Flora Victoria Christensen (music teacher). Anders Hansen, the proprietor of a tavern in the basement, resided in the associated dwelling with the Jens Andersen and one maid. Anna Schougaard, a tailor (widow), resided in the ground floor apartment of the Rådhusgade wing with herthree children (aged 15 to 18) and one maid.Ane Marie Jessen and their three children (aged one to seven). Pernille Jacobsen, a former tavern keeper, resided in the first floor apartment with her three children (aged four to seven) and one maid. Hans Heinrich Jessen, a building painter, resided in the second floor apartment with his wife Hulda Otilia Bech, a 29-year-old tailor, resided on the third floor.

== Architecture ==
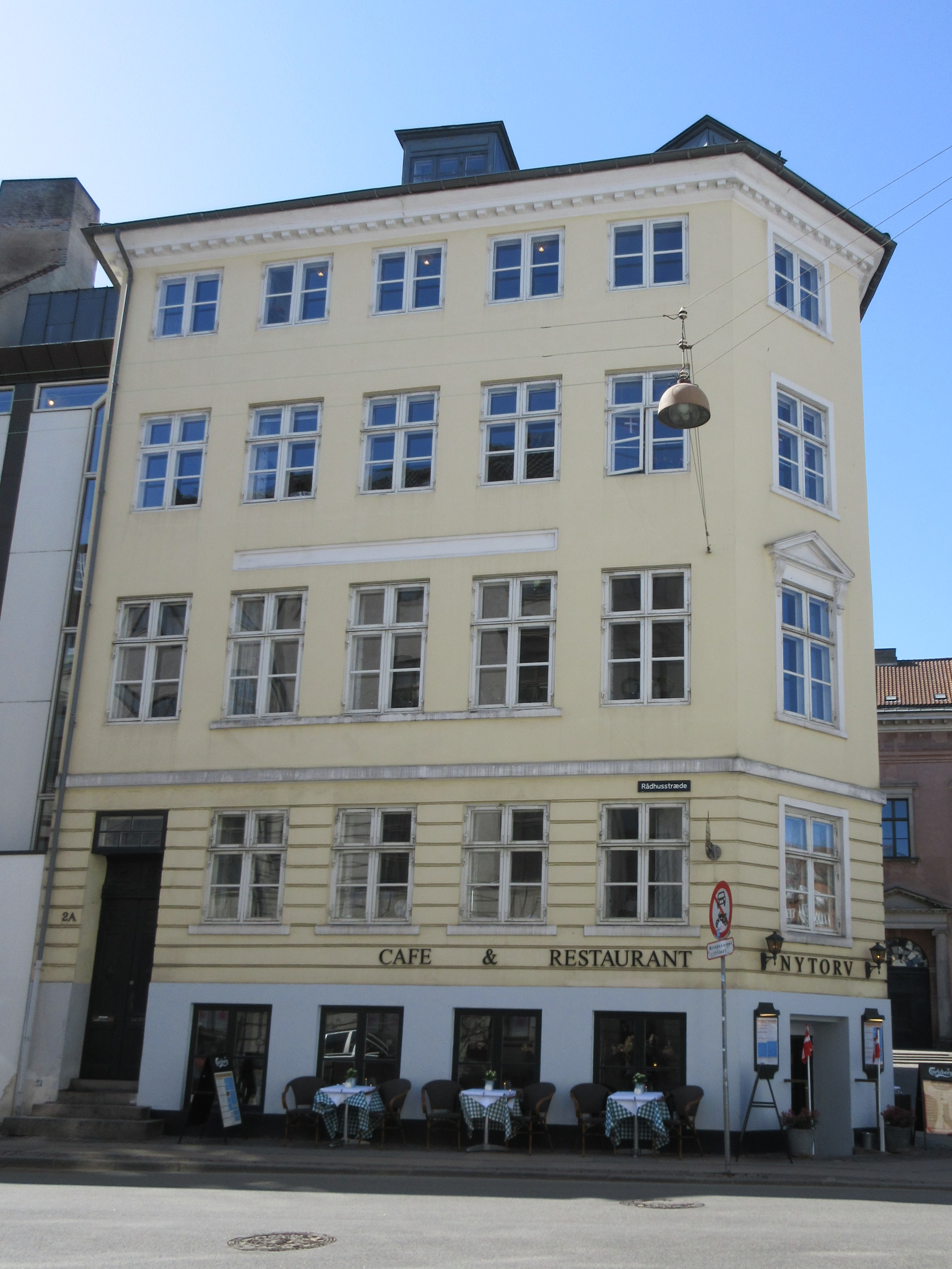
The corner building seen from Rådhusstræde.

Nytorv 15 is constructed with four storeys over a walk-out basement. It has a three-bay facade towards the square, a five-bay facade towards Rådhusstræde and a chamfered corner bay. The latter was dictated for all corner buildings by Jørgen Henrich Rawert's and Peter Meyn's guidelines for the rebuilding of the city after the fire so that the fire department's long ladder companies could navigate the streets more easily. The plastered facade is finished with shadow joints below a belt course on the ground floor. Other decorative elements include projecting sills below the first floor windows, blond friezes between the central windows of the first and second floor, a triangular pediment above the first floor corner window, and a dentillated cornice.

The eight-bay-wide building at Rådhusstræde 2B is also constructed with four-storeys above a walk-out basement. The plastered facade is also finished here with a belt course, a blind frieze and a dentillated cornice. The narrow space between the two buildings has now been filled by a modern connector, with a door opening to a courtyard on the rear.

== Today ==
The building is owned today by E/F Nytorv 15/Rådhusstræde 2 A-C. It contains two condominiums on each floor, one in the corner building (Nytorv 15) and one in the Rådhusstræde wing (Rådhusstræde 2).
