= Waage Sandø =

Danish actor (born 1943)

Waage Sandø (born 8 May 1943) is a Danish theatre, film and television actor. He is known to international audiences mainly for his appearances in the TV series Bedrag (Follow the Money)

Sandø, son of a tavern owner in Copenhagen, was born in the Copenhagen suburb of Vesterbro and educated at the Private Theatre School from 1964 to 1966. From 1968-1970 he worked at Aarhus Theatre and he was head of the Open Air Theatre in Copenhagen from 1968-1973 as well as the Swale Hall in Aarhus from 1970 to 1975. From 1975-1977 he was an actor and director at Det Danske Teater, the Folketeatret and the TV-Theatre, and from 1977-1985 he was director of Odense Teater. Then he started as a freelance actor in Copenhagen.

Sandø has worked in both theatre, cabaret, radio, television and film, and from 1990 onwards he has been permanently attached to the Royal Danish Theatre. In 1991 he became head of Det Danske Teater.

He appeared in films like Min fynske barndom (1994), Kun en pige (1995), At kende sandheden (Facing the Truth, 2002). From television he is particularly remembered from hit series Landsbyen (The Village, 1991–1996, alongside Danish superstars Peter Schrøder and Niels Skousen), Rejseholdet (Unit One, with Lars Bom) and most recently as director Kaj Holger Nielsen in Krøniken (The Chronicle, 2003–2006). Sandø is married to an actress.
