= Elise Holst =

Danish actress

Elise (Elisabeth Frederikke Margrethe) Holst (23 November 1811 – 8 April 1891), was a Danish stage actress. She was active at the Royal Danish Theatre in 1827-1870, and is counted as among the elite of her profession at the time, famed as a tragedienne.

Elise Holst was the daughter of the writer Jens Stephan Heger and the actress Eline Heger and married from 1834 to the actor Wilhelm Conrad Holst. She was instructed by her mother and made her debut in 1827. She mainly played the role of ingenue in tragedies, and are famed for her interpretations of the contemporary ideal of female virtue in the style of new classicism, and are described as a great tragedienne.
