= Nørrebros Theater =

Theater in Copenhagen, Denmark

Coordinates: 55°41′17.4″N 12°33′40.1″E

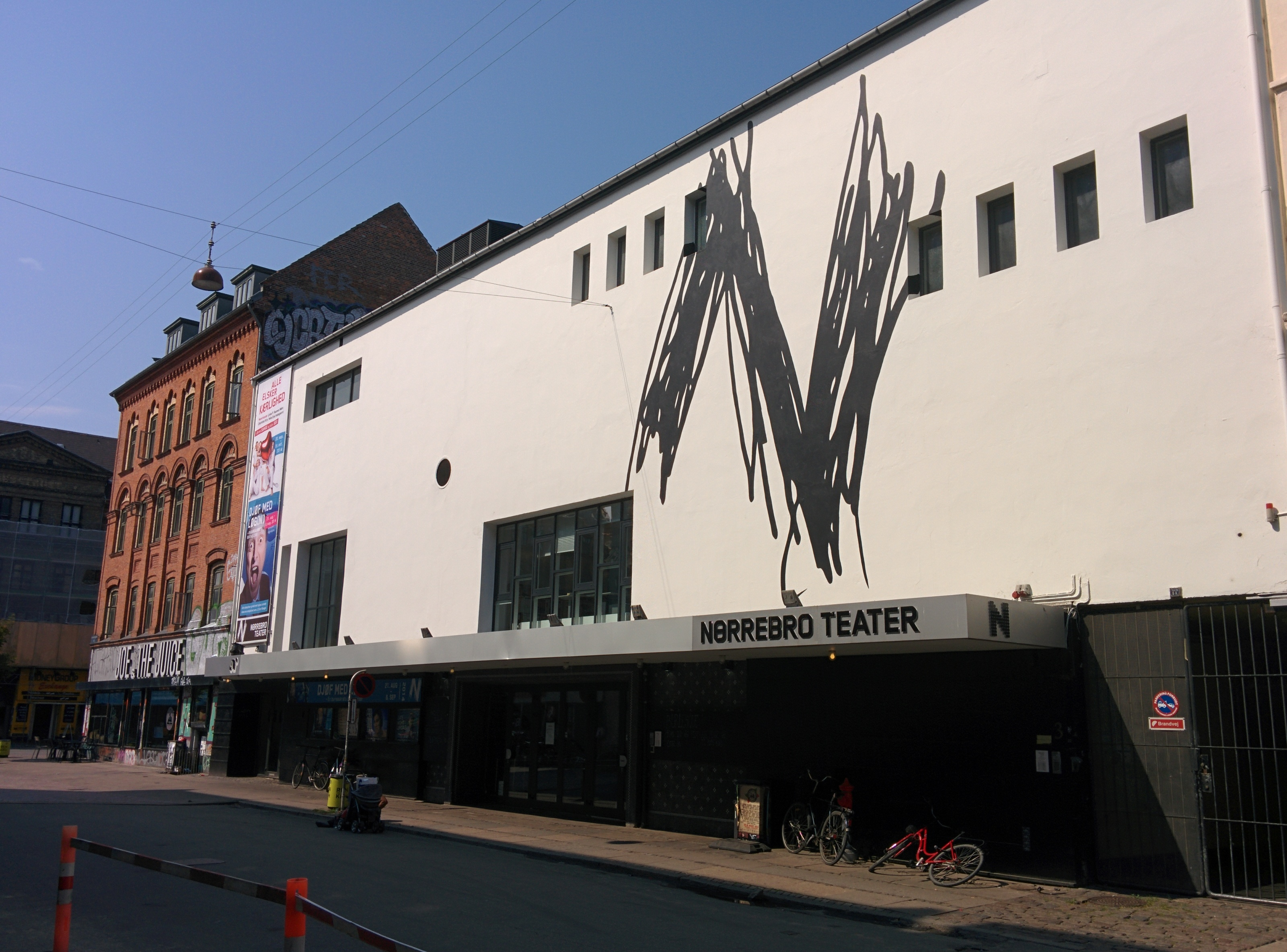
Nørrebros Theater

The Nørrebros Teater is a theater in Copenhagen, Denmark. Notable actors who have starred at the theatre before entering film include Osvald Helmuth, Buster Larsen, Poul Reichhardt and Poul Bundgaard. It is now operated as a part of the Københavns Teater in affiliation with the Betty Nansen Teatret, Folketeatret and Østre Gasværk Teater.

== History ==
Nørrebros Teater originated as the site for a popular the entertainment venue, Store Ravnsborg. Nørrebros Teater opened as a dinner theater in 1886. Under the Danish Theatre Act, shows could only last up to 45 minutes and feature a limited number of actors. The repertoire consisted of farces, operettas, comedies and revue. When Aage Stentoft (1914–1990) took over the position as theatre director in the 1930s, he converted the theatre into a more international profile with operettas and musicals. The name of the theatre was changed to Det ny Scala in 1955. In 1966, Stentoft was succeeded by Karen Marie Løwert. In 1966, Stentoft was succeeded by Karen Marie Løwert )1914-2002) and the name was changed simply to Scala in 1971. Leon Feder took over the position as theatre director in 1981. He changed the name back to Nørrebros Teater to once again give it a more local profile.

== Cultural references ==
Nørrebros Teater is used as a location in the films Hvad vil De ha'? (1956), Prinsesse for en dag (1962) and Mord for åbent tæppe (1964).
