= Hof- og Stadsretten =

Danish court

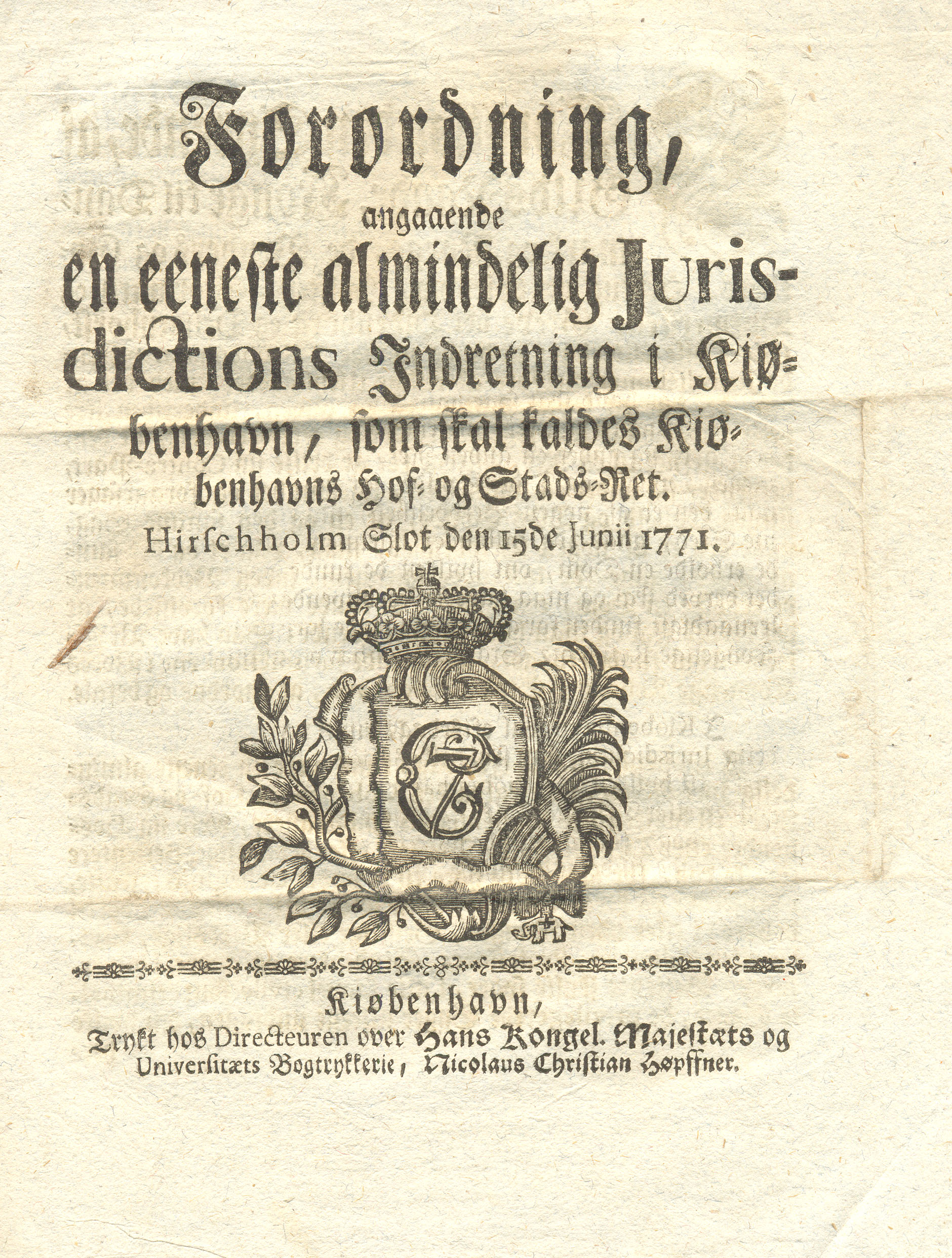
The royal charter which introduced Hof- og Stadsretten

Hof- og Stadsretten was a modern-style court of justice introduced in Denmark, specifically for Copenhagen, by Johann Friedrich Struensee in 1771. In 1805, it was merged with the new Landsoverret for Eastern Denmark as Den kongelige Landsoverret samt Hof- og Stadsret. It was replaced by the Københavns Byret and Østre Landsret in 1919.

== History ==
Instigated by Struensee and the overpræsident in Copenhagen, Ulrik Adolf Holstein (1731–1789), Hof- og Stadsretten was created in an attempt to rationalize the chaotic Danish court system. It was formally established by royal charter of 15 June 1771. Henrik Stampe was active in its practical implementation. It replaced Københavns Byting, Københavns Rådstueret (a.k.a. Rådstueret), Politi- og Kommercekollegiet, Borgretten, Hofretten and Tamperretten.

In 1805, Denmark's four existing landsting in Ringsted, Maribo, Odense and Viborg were replaced by two landsoverretter. One of them was placed in Viborg and the other one was associated with Hof- og Stadsretten, which was from then on known as Den Kgl. Landsover- samt Hof- og Stadsret i København. With the adoption of Retsplejeloven in 1919, it was replaced by Københavns Byret and Østre Landsret.

== Location ==
The initial plan was for Hof- og Stadsretten to be based in Copenhagen City Hall. When it proved impossible to find the necessary space, Hof- og Stadsretten was instead referred to rented premises in the Plessen Mansion. In 1774, after these premises had also proven too small, a building was acquired on Østergade. In 1816, Hof- og Stadsretten relocated to the new City Hall on Nytorv.

== Organization ==
Hof- og Stadsretten introduced new principles to the Danish court system, especially by being divided into separate investigative and judicial departments. Each of the judicial divisions had five judges on a fixed salary, who were banned from holding other administrative offices.

== People ==
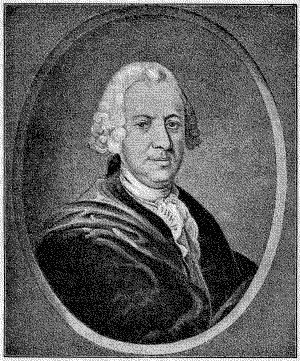
Frederik Horn

The key people associated with Hof- og Stadsretten are listed below.

=== Presidents ===
- (1771–1781) Frederik Horn
- (1771–1788) Anker Andreas Suhm
- (1788–1789) Oluf Lundt Bang
- (1789–1798) Enevold Berregaard Fogh
- (1798–1805) Carl Vigand Falbe

=== Secretaries ===
- (1771–1785) Frederik Christian Mahling
- (1785–1803) Frederik Horn
- (1804–1805) Christian Frederik Bang

=== Judges ===
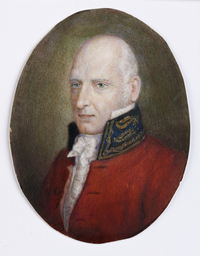
Hans Heger

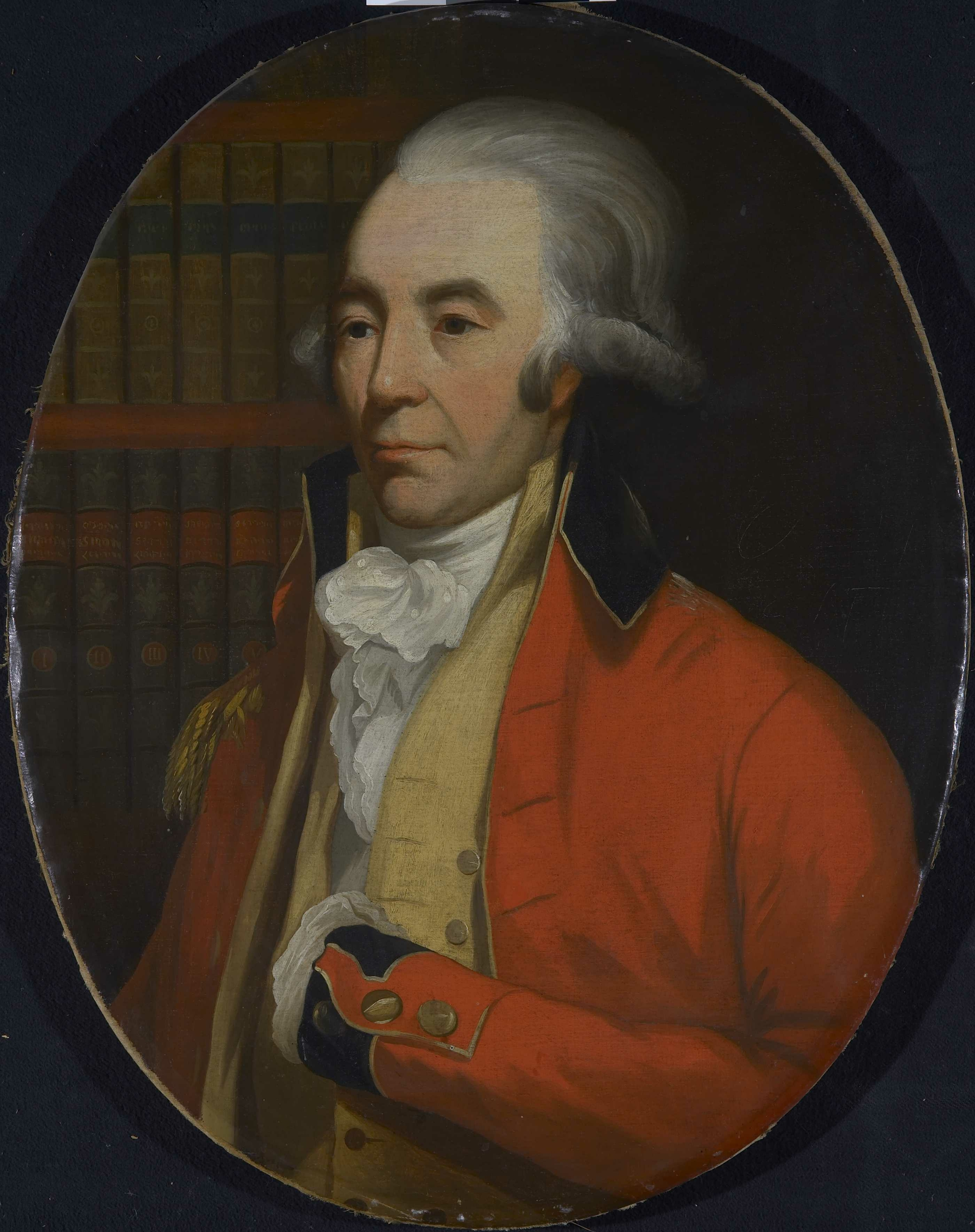
Ole Christopher Wessel

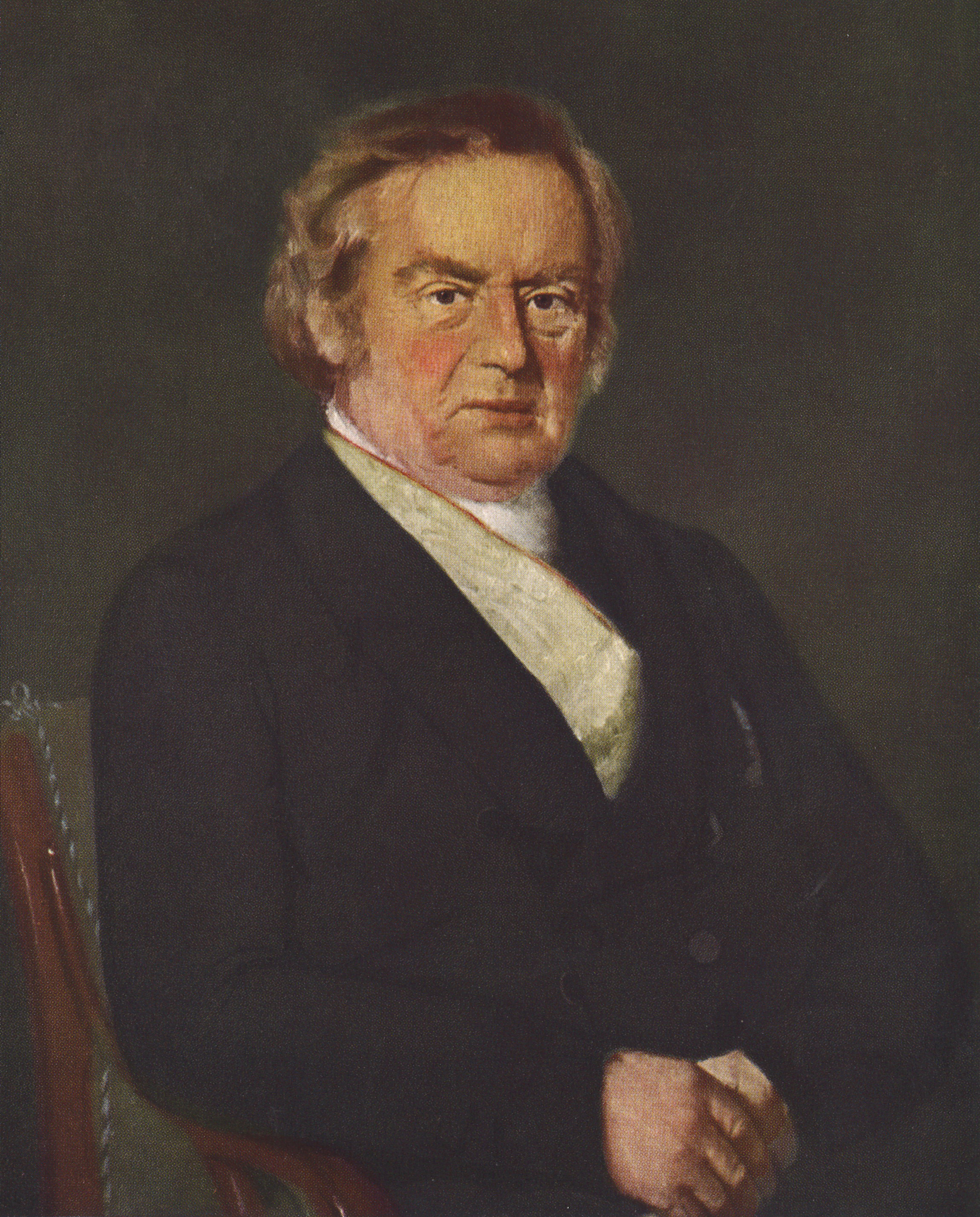
Anders Sandøe Ørsted

- (1771–1781) Anker Andreas Suhm
- (1771–1788) Truels Ortved
- (1771–1788) Enevold Berregård Liigge
- (1771–1789) Enevold Berregaard Fogh
- (1771–1797) Carl Vigand Falbe
- (1771–1805) Hans Heger
- (1771–1772) Christian Frederik Jacobi
- (1771–1805) Nicolai Stabel
- (1771–1773) Johan Bartholin Eichel
- (1771–1772) Hans Jacob Hiort
- (1771–1772) Knud Holtermann
- (1771–1775) Ole Christopher Wessel
- (1772–1797) Herman Andreas Pitzler
- (1772–1773) Christen Schow
- (1772–1778) Ole Pedersen Rested
- (1772–1774) Peter Guldencrone
- (1773–1781) Jørgen Christopher Drewsen
- (1773–1801) Andreas Bang
- (1775–1778) Mads Fridsch
- (1777–1782) Friedrich Gottlieb Sporon
- (1778–1782) Peter Feddersen
- (1778–1781) Jacob Henric Schou
- (1780–1796) Ole Thestrup
- (1779–1805) Frederik Didrik Sechmann Fleischer
- (1781–1785) Georg Linde
- (1782–1805) Jacob Stendrup
- (1782–1805) Ditlev Frederik Feddersen
- (1772–1778) Peter Christian Zeuthen
- (1782–1805) Andreas Bjørn Rothe
- (1783–1800) Poul Frederik Beckmann
- (1788–1793) Anker Vilhelm Frederik Bornemann
- (1777–1805) Peter Wedege
- (1777–1805) Johan Henrik Barens
- (1790–1801) Jens Schifter
- (1790–1802) Frederik Winkel-Horn
- (1790–1796) Adam Gottlob Muller
- (1790–1797) Jørgen Lottrup Schydtz
- (1790–1801) Christian Rafn
- (1783–1797) Peter Collet
- (1784–1791) Hans Hagerup Falbe
- (1794–1805) Christian Henrik Carstens
- (1794–1801) Peter Christian Bagger
- (1795–1802) Bredo Henrik v.Munthe af Morgenstierne
- (1800–1805) Casper Friedrich Lassen
- (1801–1805) Jens Kras Høst
- (1801–1805) Anders Sandøe Ørsted
- (1802–1804) Peter Bangert
- (1802–1805) Poul Abraham Dall
- (1803–1805) Hans Casper Jacobsen
- (1804–1805) Herman Gerhard Treschow

== See also ==
- Copenhagen Birk
