= Eline Heger =

Danish actress (1774–1842)

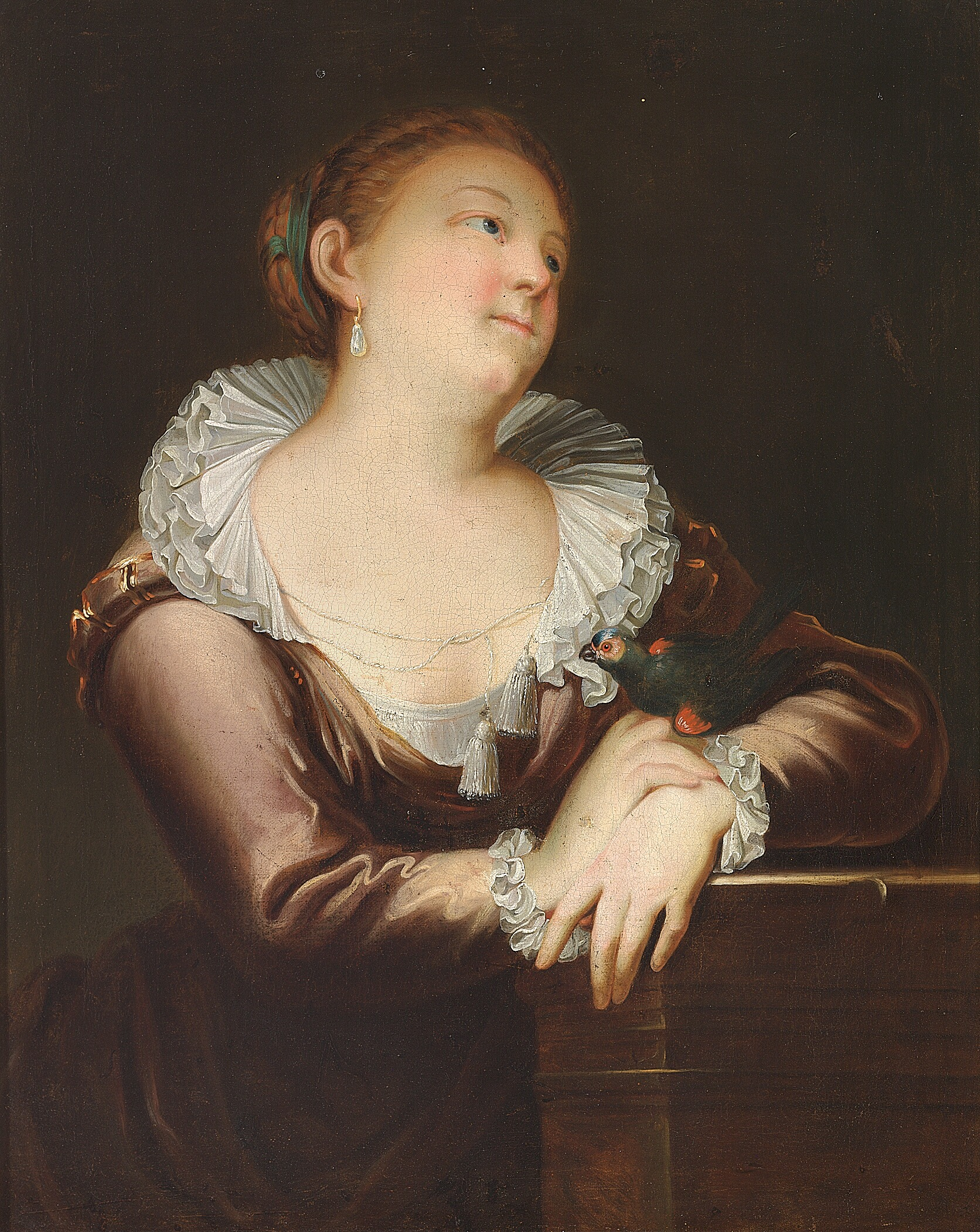
- Portrait of Heger in costume as Dyveke, painted by Herman Koefoed c. 1796
- Born: Ellen Maria Smidth; December 13, 1774; Copenhagen, Denmark
- Died: June 6, 1842 (aged 67); Tårbæk, Denmark
- Spouse: Stephan Heger (m. 1797)
- Children: Elise Holst

Ellen Marie Heger née Schmidt (13 December 1774 in Copenhagen – 6 June 1842 in Tårbæk), known as Eline Heger, was a Danish stage actress. During her career from 1793 to 1832, she performed no fewer than eighty unique roles.

Heger often performed as a romantic heroine. She is best known for her roles in Adam Oehlenschläger's plays, as she was highly influential in his theatrical career and is believed to have been the model for the Nordic heroine in his tragedies.

== Biography ==
Ellen Marie Schmidt was born 13 December 1774 in Copenhagen to Anne Reinsdorf and Thomas Schmidt. She came from a poor, bourgeois family. Her father was a coppersmith and an alcoholic who was unable to support his family. To supplement their income, her mother washed clothes with Eline's help.

In an effort to earn more money for the family, her mother placed Eline in the ballet school of the Royal Danish Theatre in 1789, hoping to establish another income stream. She was just fifteen years old at the time, and remained a student there until 1793 under the tutelage of Vincenzo Galeotti. On 26 November of that year, she made her debut as an actress as Lucette in De Gode Moder.

As an actress, she became much beloved and was known for playing heroines. Among her admirers were Knud Lyne Rahbek, Henrich Steffen, and her later husband Stephan Heger. She and Stephan were married on 4 February 1797. They had ten children together: Wilhelmine (1797), Anna Louise (1799), Hans Christian (c. 1802), Jens Frederik (1804), Hans Christian (1806), Eline Marie (1808), Elise (1811), Edvard (1813), Juliane Sophie (1815), and Johan Carl Peter (1818). Apart from authoring children's books, Stephan was not very involved in raising their children, and Eline managed the home and her children's upbringings alongside her career.

Heger's final role on stage was as Sophie in Thomasine Christine Gyllembourg-Ehrensvärd's play Magt og List. She performed at the play's premiere in 1832, but suffered a stroke soon after which left her partially paralysed and unable to speak. She communicated through a chalkboard for the remainder of her life. She and her husband separated shortly thereafter, and she went to live with her two daughters Eline Marie and Juliane Sophie. Her daughter Elise Holst became an actress and replaced her in many of her theatrical roles after her abrupt retirement. She died on 6 June 1842 in Tårbæk and was buried at Lyngby Church.

== List of roles ==
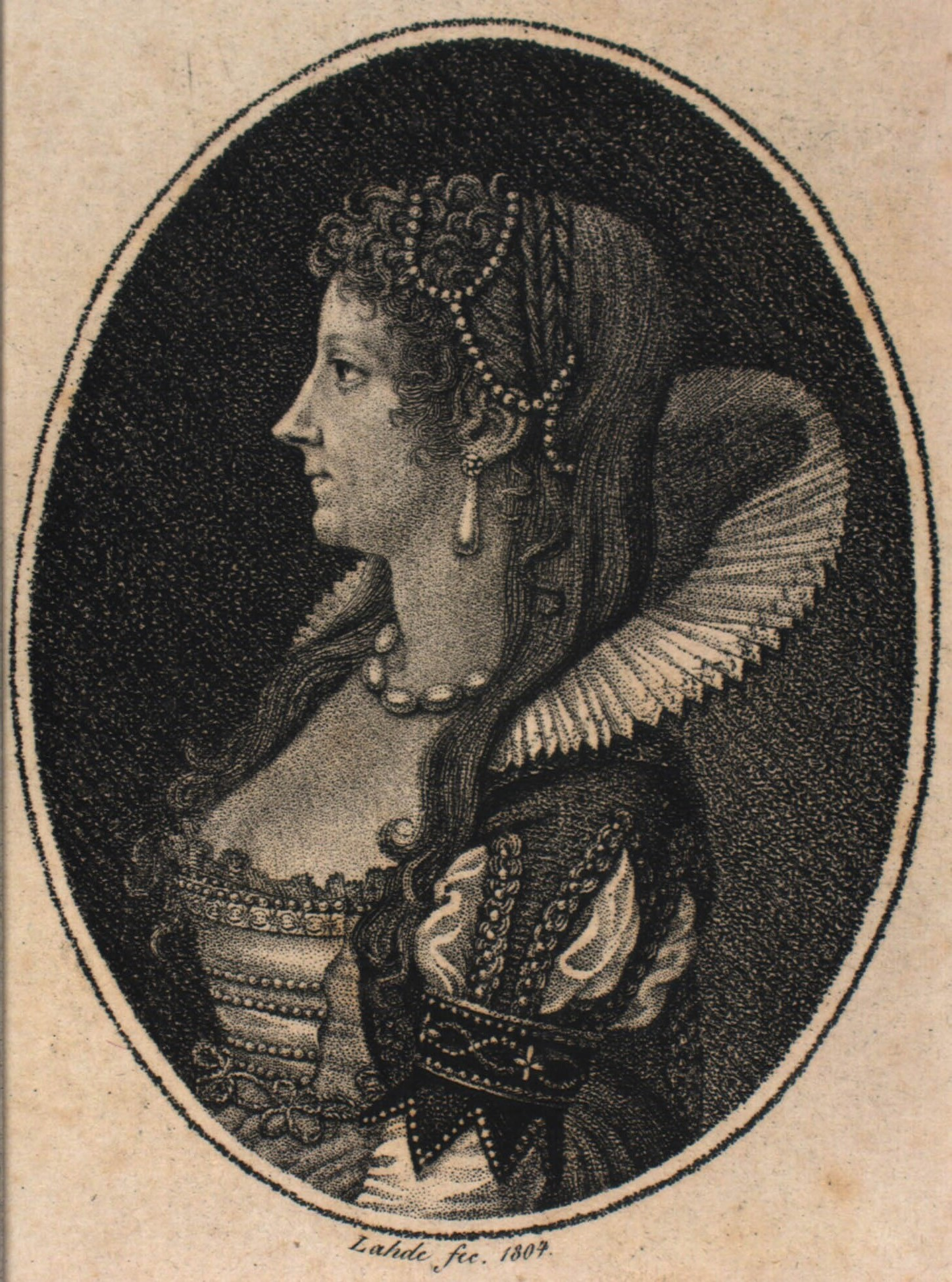
Heger in costume, 1807

* Den gode moder as Lucette (1793, 1797)
- Emilie Galotti as Emilie Galotti (1793, 1797, 1800, 1806)
- Han blander sig i alt as Charlotte (1794, 1797, 1798, 1809)
- Pigen fra Marienborg as Cathinka (1794, 1797)
- Vejen til ødelæggelse as Sophie Freelove (1794)
- Barselstuen as Engelke Hattemagers (1795, 1796, 1799)
- De aftakkede officerer as Lovise (1795, 1800, 1803)
- De fire formyndere as Miss Nancy Lovely (1795, 1797)
- De to søskende as Mariane (1795)
- De to venner as Pauline (1795)
- Den godmodige familie as Sophie (1795, 1797, 1799)
- Gamle og nye sæder as Kirstine (1795, 1797, 1798)
- Hekseri as Terentia (1795)
- Juliane von Lindorak as Juliane von Lindorak (1795, 1797, 1805)
- Kjolen fra Lyon as Constance von Birbak (1795, 1797, 1807)
- Ringen as Komtesse Wildhelm (1795)
- Ægteskabsskolen as Charlotte Silkeborg (1795, 1798)
- Advokaterne as Fredericia (1796, 1800, 1804, 1809, 1812)
- Armod og høimodighed as Lovise (1796, 1797, 1799, 1802, 1806, 1816)
- Bortførelsen as Henriette (1796, 1799)
- Den lykkelige familie as Clara (1796)
- The Political Tinker as Raadsherreinde (1796, 1797, 1806)
- Den skarpe kniv kan let faa skaar as Wilhelmine (1796)
- Det tyvende aars ægteskab as Marie Lønberg (1796)
- Dyveke as Dyveke (1796, 1797, 1803)
- Høstdagen as Amalila Fersen (1796, 1798)
- Jøden as Elise (1796, 1797)
- Kuren as Constane (1796)
- Rejsen til byen as Salome (1796, 1798)
- Ulysses von Ithacia as Pallas (1796)
- Væddemaalet as Frøken Adelaide (1796, 1802)
- Ægtefolkene fra landet as Karoline Bernhard (1796, 1797, 1806)
- De noble passioner as Leonore (1797, 1800, 1803)
- Den sanseløse as Isabella (1797)
- Galejslaven as Amalia (1797)
- Ja eller nej as Julie/Antonette (1797)
- Jægerne as Frederikke (1797)
- Manden paa fyrretyve aar as Julie (1797)
- Niels Ebbesen af Nørreris as Estrith (1797, 1802, 1805)
- Sammensværgelsen mod Peter den Store as Cyrilla (1797)
- De to poststationer as Wilhelmine (1798)
- Falsk undseelse as Wilhelmine (1798, 1803, 1808)
- Heckingborn as Lady Fletscher (1798, 1803, 1805, 1810)
- Ringen as Henriette von Darring (1798)
- Skumlerne as Jenny (1798)
- Den forladte datter as Lovise (1799, 1801, 1802, 1803, 1805, 1808, 1810, 1812)
- Emigranterne as Adelaide d'Arras (1799)
- Beverley as Henriette (1800)
- Fredsmægleren as Lucilie (1800)
- Herman von Unna as Sophie (1800, 1802, 1807, 1820)
- Korsikanerne as Ottilia (1800)
- Armod og højmodighed as Lovise (1801, 1810)
- Barselstuen as Dame (1801, 1803, 1804, 1805, 1807, 1822)
- Den værdige fader as Sophie (1801)
- Octavia as Octavia (1802)
- Onkelrollen as Louise (1802)
- Eugenie as Eugenie (1803)
- Ringen as Ubekendt (1803, 1810)
- Selim, prins af Algier as Irena (1805)
- Tvekampen as Laura (1807)
- Menneskehad og anger as Eulalia (1810, 1819)
- Snedkeren i Lifland as Eudoxia Mazeppa (1810)
- General Schlenzheim og hans familie as Sophie (1814)
- Balders død as Nanna (1816)
- Sammensværgelsen mod Peter den Store as Natalia (1817)
- Falsk undseelse as Fru Heldmand (1821)
- Embedsiver as Hofraadinde Rosen (1823)
- Skumlerne as Emilie (1823)
- Niels Ebbesen af Nørreris as Jutta (1824)
- Dyveke as Sigbrit (1826)
- Hamlet as Gertrude (1826)
- Myndlingerne as Madame Drave (1826)
- Emilie Galotti as Claudia Galotti (1827)
- Romeo and Juliet as Lady Capulet (1828)
- Hamlet as Ophelia (1829)
- Jøden as Madame Rathcliffe (1829)
- Ringen as Fru von Darring (1829)
- The Merry Wives of Windsor as Margaret Page (1830)
- Magt og list (1832)
