= Copenhagen Birk =

Copenhagen Birk (Danish: Københavns Birk) was a Danish jurisdiction which existed from 1683 until 1817, covering much of suburban Copenhagen. The birk thing was initially held in Ballerup but from 1803 moved to Blåtårn in Copenhagen. In 1817, Copenhagen Birk was divided into Copenhagen Southern Birk and Copenhagen Northern Birk.

== History ==
In 1682, Adam Levin Knuth was appointed county governor (amtmand) of Copenhagen County. Copenhagen County comprised the hundreds of Sokkelund and Smørum and the parishes of g Farum, Ganløse, Slagslunde, Stenløse, Viksø and Værløse in Ølstykke Herred. In January 1683, he proposed that the three hundreds of Sokkelund, Smørum and Ølstykke be merged into a single jurisdiction. Copenhagen Birk was subsequently established by royal decree of 3 March 1683. It comprised the three hundreds with the exception of Copenhagen proper (Københavns Byting), Amager (Christianshavn Byting, Taarnby Birketing, and the Dutch thing in Store Magleby and Ny Hollænderby). As proposed by Knuth, Ballerup was selected as the location of the local birk thing. This could either be done by merging them into a single hundred or as a birk.

In 1721, Copenhagen Birk, was renamed Copenhagen County's Cavalry District Birk (Københavns Amts Rytterdistrikts Birk)

In 1819, Copenhagen Birk was divided into Copenhagen Southern Birk and Copenhagen Northern Birk.
