= Østre Gasværk Teater =

Theatre in Copenhagen, Denmark

Coordinates: 55°42′36.3″N 12°34′54.5″E

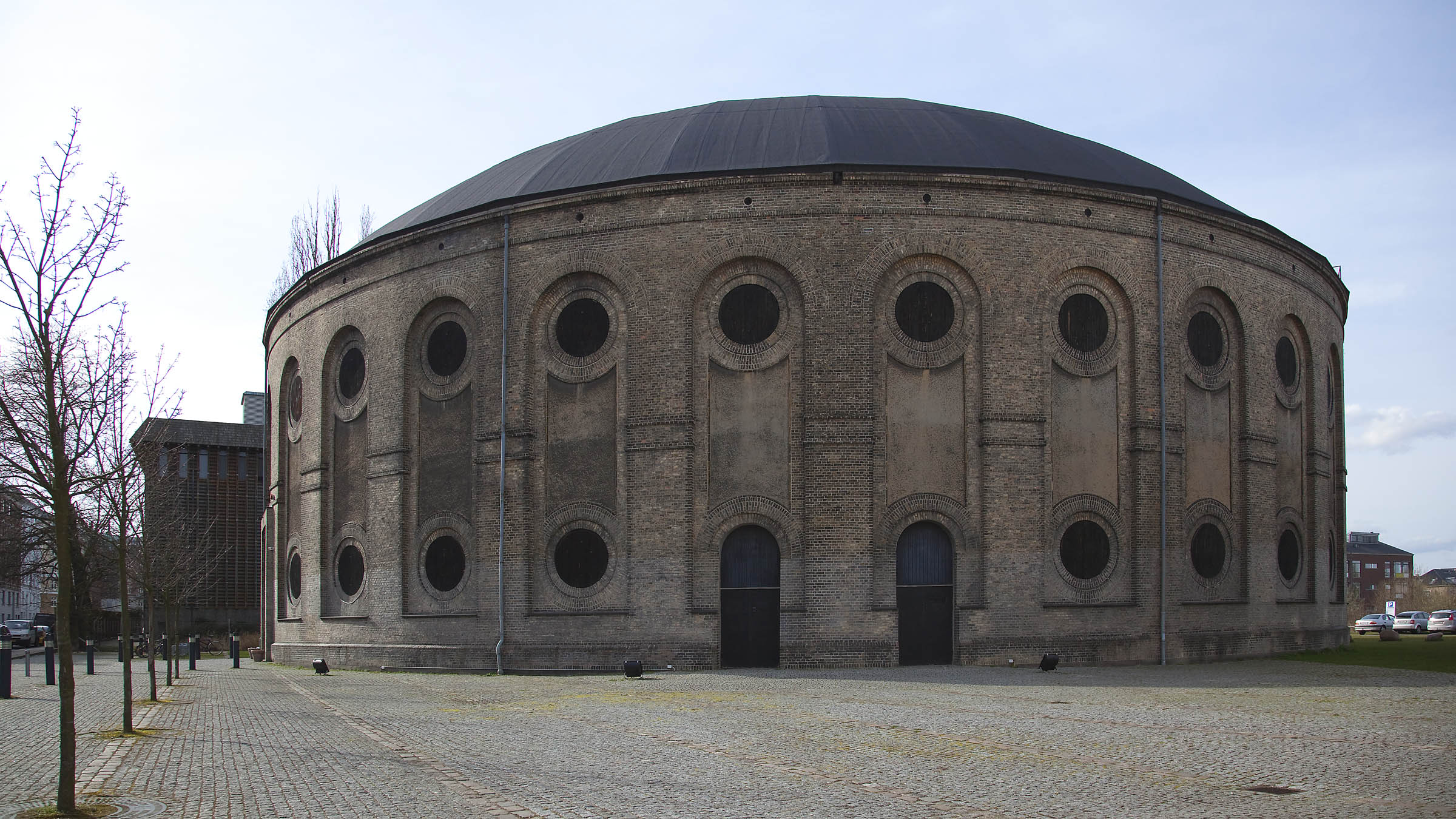
- The circular masonry of the old gasworks dating from 1883
- Interactive map of Østre Gasværk Teater
- Address: Østerbro; Copenhagen; Denmark
- Capacity: 812 (seated)

Construction
- Opened: 1979
- Architect: Martin Nyrop

Website
- www.Gasvaerket.dk

Østre Gasværk Teater is a theatre in the Østerbro district of Copenhagen, Denmark, located in an abandoned gasholder house of the former Østre Gasværk (‘Eastern Gasworks’). The theatre is constructed within the masonry shell that used to house the gas holder, also known as a gasometer, proper. Built in 1883, it was one of the first independent works of Martin Nyrop, who would later become known for his design of the Copenhagen City Hall.

== History ==
Østre Gasværk was opened in 1878 as the city's second gasworks, when its first gasworks, Vestre Gasværk, a facility located at the site of the current Meatpacking District, no longer could satisfy the rapidly growing demand for gas. The gasometer now housing Østre Gasværk Teater was constructed in 1881-83 as the first of a series of expansions that quadrupled the capacity of the plant in the time up to the turn of the century.

In 1970 it was shut down and was for a while used as a storage for decorations for the Royal Theatre, while awaiting demolition. From 1979, the building started a second life as a venue for various plays and performances. The first production was William Shakespeare's A Midsummer Night's Dream in 1986. From 1992-98 the theatre had big success with musicals, including Les Misérables, Miss Saigon and Atlantis .

The interior of the theater was renovated in 2018. It is now operated as a part of the Københavns Teater in affiliation with the Betty Nansen Teatret, Folketeatret and Nørrebros Theater.

== Cultural references ==
Østre Gasværk is the title of a 1976 song by Gasolin'.
