= Københavns Teater =

Danish theatrical organisation that manages theatres

Københavns Teater (lit. 'Theatre of Copenhagen'), often referred to as kbht,, is a self-owning organization under the Danish Ministry of Culture responsible for sponsoring and managing a number of theatres in the Greater Copenhagen area. The theaters within the organization are managed by a board that decides which venues should be offered. The members of the Board of Directors are appointed from among persons affiliated with the acting industry.

== Theatres ==
As of 2026, theatres managed by the organization include:

- Betty Nansen Teatret
- Republique / Revolver
- Folketeatret
- Østre Gasværk Teater
- Nørrebros Theater

As of 2020, Det Ny Teater receives a rent subsidy and the Danish Dance Theatre is provided a special grant.
