= Hans Heger =

Danish judge (1747–1819)

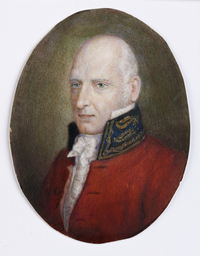
Hans Heger

Hans Heger (8 February 1747 – 28 November 1819) was a Danish judge. In 1771, he was appointed as one of the first 12 judges in the new Hof- og Stadsret. He was the father of Kamma Rahbek, actor Stephan Heger and royal librarian Carl Heger. His daughter Christiane Heger married Adam Oehlenschläger.

== Biography ==
Heger was born on 8 February 1747 in Copenhagen, the son of Stephan Pedersen Heger and Karen Hansdatter Krarup. His father owned a brewery at Nørregade No. 52.

== Career ==
Heger studied law at the University of Copenhagen. He became a judge at Hofretten. On 25 June 1771, he was appointed as one of the first 12 judges in the new Hof-og Stadsret. He remained in office until 1805 and was awarded the title of Konferensråd. On his father's death, he also continued the family's brewery.

== Personal life ==
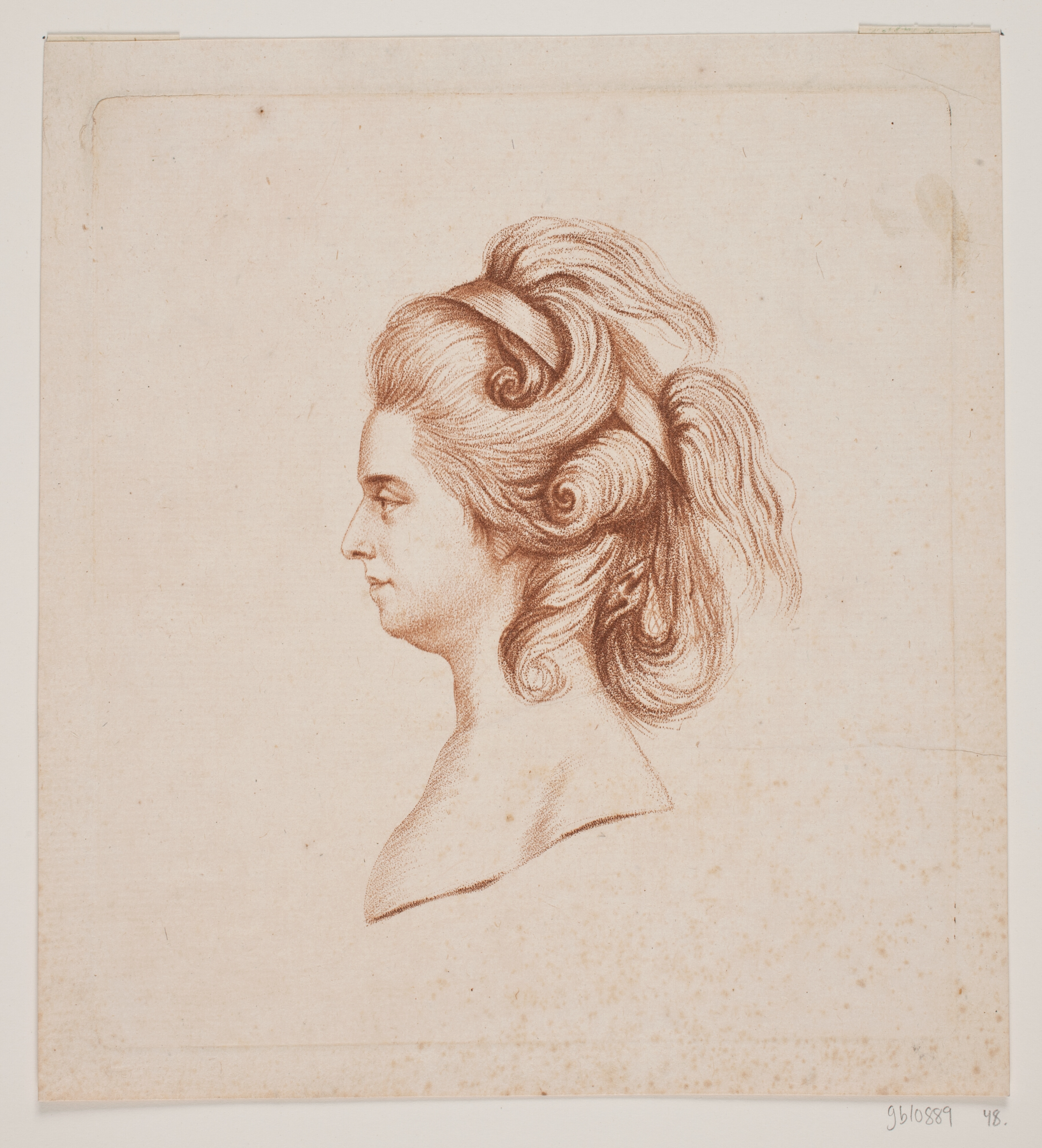
Portrait by Heger of his wife.

Heger was married to Anna Louise Drewsen, daughter of Johan Drewsen and Else Margrethe Finckenhoff. His father-in-law had founded the successful paper factory at Strandmøllen. Hans and Anna Louise Heger had four children: Stephan, Kamma, Peder Carl and Christiane.

Heger took a broad interest in both art and science, especially astronomy, languages and botany. He painted, drew, and created a wide range of objects, including furniture, decorative boxes, binoculars, and also composed music. Many of these interests were passed down to his daughter Kamma. Christiane married the poet Adam Oehlenschläger.

In 1807, he moved from Nørregade to an apartment at Bingårdsstræde 13 (demolished). In 1811, he moved a little down the street to another apartment at Vingårdstræde 21. He died on 28 November 1819. Adam Oehlenschläger wrote a poem about him for his funeral.
