= Stephan Heger =

Danish actor and writer

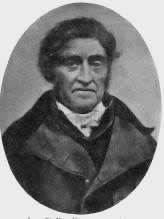
Stephan Heger

Stephan Heger (17 September 1769 – 8 March 1855) was a Danish actor and writer. He was married to the actress Eline Heger.

== Biography ==
Heger was born on 7 September 1765, the son of judge and brewer Hans Heger and Anna Louise Drewsen. He was the elder brother of librarian Carl Heger and Kamma Rahbek. He completed his secondary schooling in 1788. He attended the Royal Danish Academy of Fine Arts and worked as a private tutor before deciding to pursue a career in acting. Heger had his debut at the Royal Danish Theatre on 14 April 1796 as Figaro in Beaumarchais’ Figaros Giftermaal. His last performance took place on 21 April 1817 as Oakly in Den skinsyge Kone.

In his long retirement Heger published a number of writings on educational and ethical subjects. He was a co-founder of Rysensteen Bath House. Heger was married to Eline (Ellen Marie) Schmidt (1774–1842). They lived at the corner of Nytorv and Rådhusstræde at the time of the 1801 census.

== List of roles ==
Heger made the following appearances at the Royal Danish Theatre:

- Armod og højmodighed as Claus (1796, 1798, 1801, 1802, 1804, 1806, 1807, 1808, 1816)
- Barselstuen as Advokat (1796, 1798, 1799, 1801, 1804, 1805, 1808, 1809, 1810, 1811, 1813)
- Den pantsatte bondedrenge as Raadsherre (1796)
- Den politiske kandestøber as Advokat (1796, 1799)
- Den stundesløse as Leander (1796, 1799)
- Emilie Galotti as Kammertjener hos prinsen (1796, 1799)
- Figaros giftermaal as Figaro (1796)
- Gamle og nye sæder as Louis (1796)
- Han blander sig i alt as Plumper (1796)
- Jægerne as Anton (1796)
- Kun seks retter as Fritz (1796)
- Kuren as Clitander (1796)
- Rejsen til byen as Ernst (1796, 1800)
- Ringen as Feu (1796, 1799)
- Strelitzerne as Soldat (1796)
- Søofficererne as Glitter (1796)
- Vinhøsten as Wenzel (1796)
- Bagtalelsens skole as Sir Benjamin Backbite (1797)
- De pæne piger as Henrik (1797)
- Den døve elsker as Johan, tjener (1797)
- Den gerrige as Simon (1797)
- Den pantsatte bondedrenge as Leander (1797)
- Den sanseløse as Carlin (1797)
- Embedsiver as Jagtjunker (1797, 1802)
- Fejltagelserne as Tony Lumpkin (1797, 1801, 1805)
- Gert Westphaler as Apotekersvend (1797)
- Hekseri as Hans Frandsen (1797)
- Ja eller nej as Hr. Erast (1797)
- Jacob von Tyboe as Jens (1797)
- Lykkens hjul as Sydenham (1797)
- Myndlingerne as Friederich (1797, 1799)
- Niels Ebbesen af Nørreris as Hans Frost (1797)
- Sammensværgelsen mod Peter den Store as Fyrst Serdjukow (1797)
- Vejen til ødelæggelse as Kontorbetjent (1797)
- Venskab paa prøve as Notarius (1797, 1800)
- Den ellevte Juni as Knud (1798)
- Den skinsyge kone as Sir Harry Beagle (1798, 1799, 1804)
- Fætteren i Lissabon as Tjener (1798)
- Heckingborn as Niclas (1798)
- Pagen as Kammertjener (1798)
- Peters bryllup as Bonde (1798)
- Armod og høimodighed as Claus (1799)
- Den ellevte Juni as Henri (1799)
- Jeppe paa Bjerget as Kammertjeneren (1799, 1800, 1802
- Købmanden i Smyrna as Andre (1799)
- Tro ingen for vel as Ernst (1799)
- Udstyret as Tjener (1799)
- Det lykkelige skibbrud as Henrik (1800)
- Fætteren i Lissabon as Retsbetjent (1800)
- Landsbyteatret as Frank (1800)
- Serenaden as Lars (1800)
- Skumlerne as Prunk (1800)
- Vejen til ødelæggelse as Jacob (1800)
- Barberen i Sevilla as Figaro (1801, 1803, 1808, 1815)
- De aftakkede officerer as von Fannenberg (1801)
- De to grenaderer as Armand (1801)
- Gert Westphaler as Henrik (1801)
- Gulddaasen as Lars (1801)
- Hvad vil folk sige? as Andrew (1801)
- Ægtefolkene fra landet as Johan (1802)
- De to dage as Officer (1803)
- Den værdige fader as Ferdinand (1803)
- De to dage as Skildvagt (1805, 1807)
- Jeppe paa Bjerget as Advokat (1805, 1813)
- Jacob von Tyboe as Magister Stygotius (1806, 1809, 1816)
- Besøget as Overforstmester Arlstein (1809, 1810, 1811, 1812, 1813, 1814, 1816)
- Herman von Unna as Anklager (1809)
- Syv tusinde rigsdaler as Kaptajn Hennings (1809)
- Sølvbrylluppet as Dalmer, forpagter (1809)
- Axel og Valborg as Vilhelm (1810, 1813, 1814, 1815)
- Den skinsyge kone as Oakley (1810, 1817)
- Embedsiver as Justitsraad Listar (1810)
- Emilie Galotti as Grev Appiani (1810, 1815)
- Fætteren i Lissabon as Albert (1810)
- Jeppe paa Bjerget as Advokat (1810)
- Spøgelset med trommen as Baron (1810)
- Indianerne i England as Kaberdar (1811)
- Kvindelist as Destival (1811)
- Myndlingerne as Købmand Drave (1811)
- Octavia as Ventidius (1811)
- Rejsen til byen as Hr. Traut (1811)
- Falsk undseelse as Justitsraad Heldmand (1812)
- Niels Ebbesen af Nørreris Marqvard as Brokdorp (1812)
- De to brødre as Doktor Sommer (1813)
- Hamlet as Hotario (1813)
- Hjemkomsten as Foged (1813)
- Kun seks retter as Hofraad Reinhard (1813)
- Ærlighed varer længst as Henrik (1813)
- Pigen fra Marienborg as Alexander Menzikoff (1814)
- Ringen as Kaptajn von Selting (1815)
- Kong Lear as Albanien (1816)
