= List of Danish operatic sopranos =

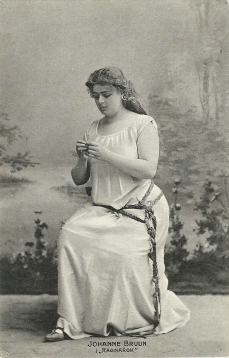
Johanne Brun as Sieglinde

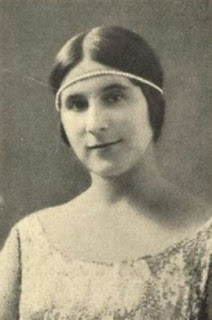
Ebba Wilton

This is a list of operatic sopranos and mezzo-sopranos who were born in Denmark or whose work is closely associated with that country.

== A ==
- Signe Asmussen (born 1970), mezzo-soprano who has performed in opera, operetta, classical concerts and jazz

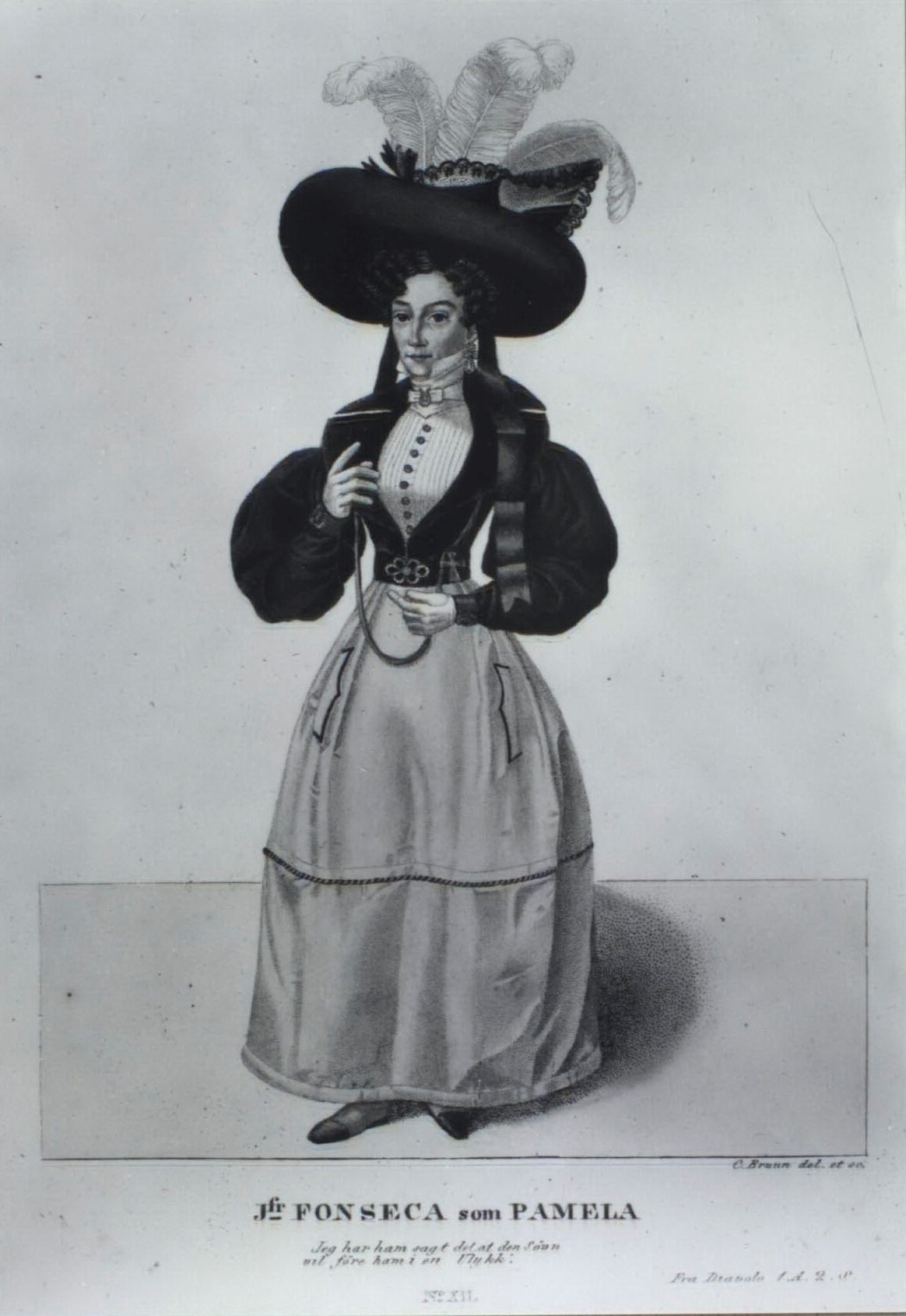
Ida Henriette da Fonseca

== B ==
- Oda Balsborg (1934–2014), soprano, recordings of Wagnerian performances
- Lisbeth Balslev (born 1945), soprano specializing in Wagnerian opera
- Henriette Bonde-Hansen (born 1963), soprano opera singer and concert performer, Reumert Award in 2014
- Charlotte Bournonville (1832–1911), actress and mezzo-soprano singer who sang in Stockholm before joining the Royal Danish Theatre
- Johanne Brun (1874–1954), opera singer who also performed in Germany

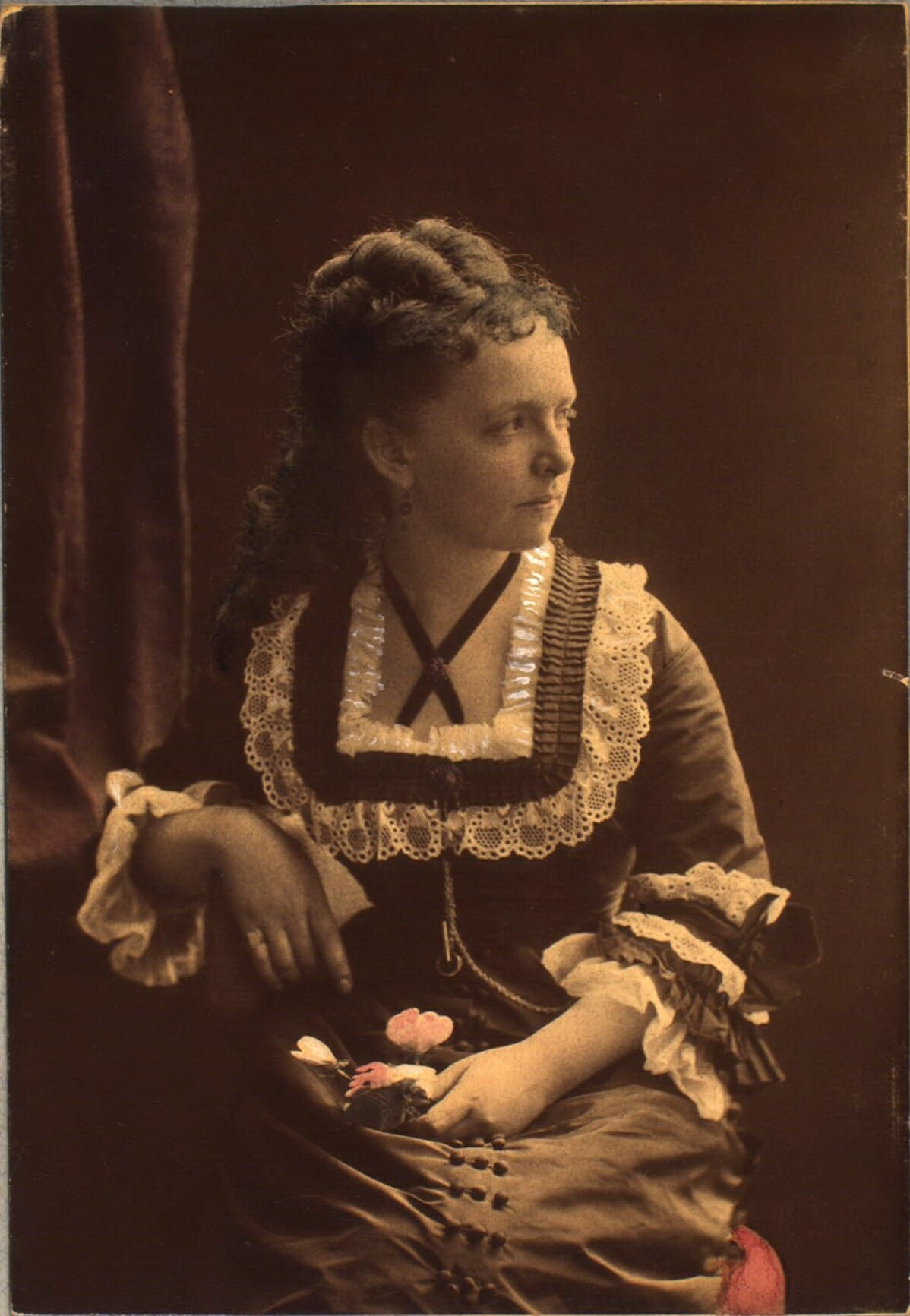
Sophie Keller

== D ==
- Inger Dam-Jensen (born 1964), soprano taking leading roles at the Royal Danish Theatre
- Elisabeth Dons (1864–1942), Paris-trained soprano and mezzo-soprano becoming a prima donna in the 1890s

== E ==
- Birgit Engell (1882–1973), German-born Danish operatic soprano who later specialized in concerts

== F ==
- Emilie da Fonseca (1803–1884), Norwegian-Danish actress and opera singer
- Ida Henriette da Fonseca (1802–1858), mezzo-soprano singer and composer who performed in operas and concerts mainly in Sweden and Germany
- Povla Frijsh (1881–1960), classical soprano and voice teacher

== G ==
- Leocadie Gerlach (1826–1919), Danish-Swedish mezzo-soprano considered the most successful singer of her day at the Royal Danish Theatre
- Edith Guillaume (1943–2013), mezzo-soprano with the Danish National Opera and the Royal Danish Opera
- Ruth Guldbæk (1919–2006), soprano at the Royal Danish Theatre, also at Covent Garden

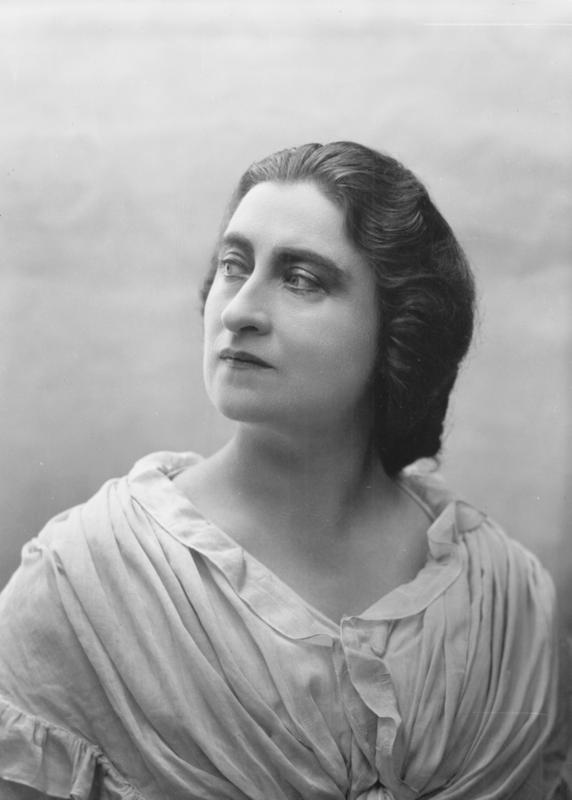
Tenna Kraft

== H ==
- Kirsten Hermansen (1930–2015), soprano at the Royal Danish Teacher, later music teacher

== J ==
- Louise Janssen (1863–1938), Danish-born soprano who sang Wagnerian roles in Lyon, France
- Eva Johansson (born 1958), soprano who has performed in opera worldwide, especially in Germany and the United States

== K ==
- Sophie Keller (1850–1929), soprano with the Royal Danish Theatre who later founded a conservatory for women
- Tina Kiberg (born 1958), soprano who has performed leading roles in the operas of Richard Strauss and Richard Wagner
- Lone Koppel (born 1938), leading soprano performer at the Royal Danish Theatre
- Tenna Kraft (1885–1954), outstanding soprano at the Royal Danish Theatre in the early 20th century
- Johanne Krarup-Hansen (1870–1958), mezzo-soprano at the Royal Danish Theatre, remembered as the first Danish Brünnhilde in Die Walküre

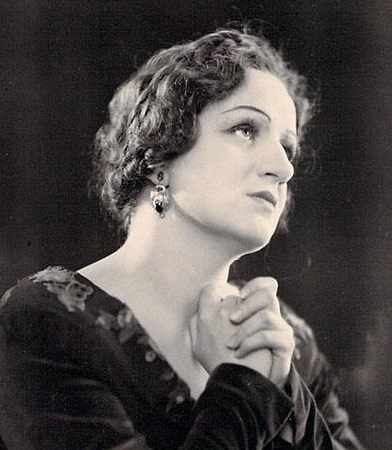
Dorothy Larsen

== L ==
- Lilly Lamprecht (1887–1976), award-winning soprano who sang at the Royal Danish Theatre from 1911
- Dorothy Larsen (1911–1990), American-born Danish operatic soprano who performed at the Royal Danish Theatre
- Margrethe Lendrop (1873–1920), soprano at the Royal Danish Theatre where she took the role of Carmen 131 times
- Anna Henriette Levinsohn (1839–1899), soprano and mezzo-soprano at the Royal Danish Theatre from 1860
- Augusta Lütken (1855–1910), popular yet untrained soprano, nine years at the Royal Danish Theatre

== M ==
- Ida Møller (1872–1947), soprano at the Royal Danish Theatre remembered for her roles in Mozart's operas
- Caroline Müller (1755–1826), highly successful mezzo-soprano first in Copenhagen and later in Stockholm

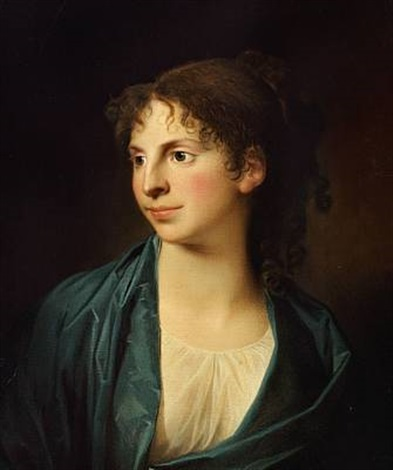
Carolina Müller

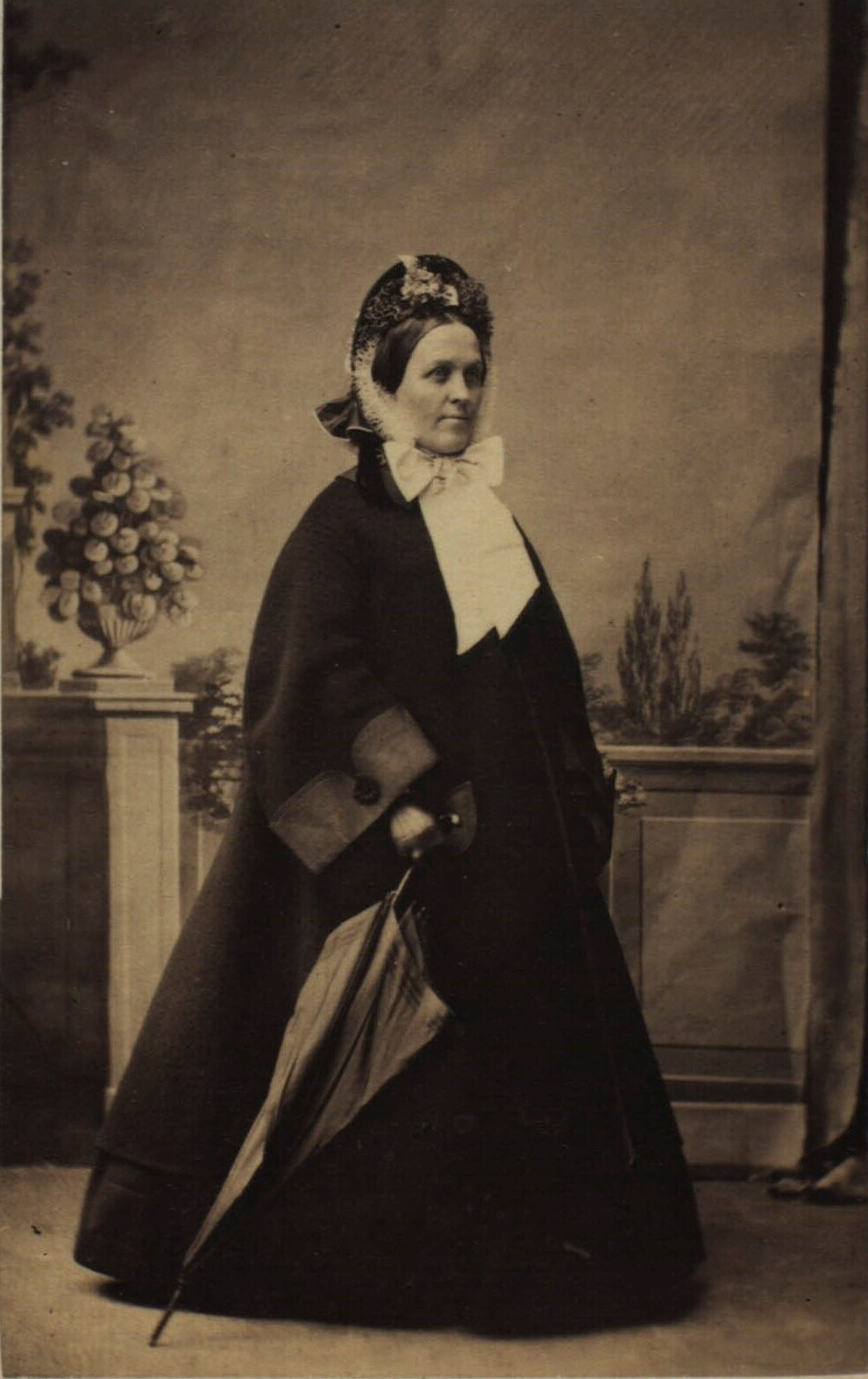
Louise Sahlgreen

== N ==
- Anna Nielsen (1803–1856), actress and mezzo-soprano singer performing with success at the Royal Danish Theatre in both plays and operas
- Inga Nielsen (1946–2008), soprano who sang in opera houses throughout Europe and the United States
- Ingeborg Nørregaard Hansen (1874–1941), soprano at the Royal Danish Theatre where she became a leading Wagnerian performer

== O ==
- Edith Oldrup (1912–1999), soprano at the Royal Danish Opera remembered for her roles in the operas of Mozart and Puccini

== Q ==
- Hedevig Quiding (1867–1936), soprano in German opera houses, voice instructor and music critic

== S ==
- Louise Sahlgreen (1818–1891), soprano, first in the choir at the Royal Danish Theatre, later performing operatic roles
- Else Schøtt (1895–1989), soprano at the Royal Danish Theatre from 1919 to 1951, later a voice teacher
- Catharine Simonsen (1816–1849), soprano at the Royal Danish Theatre, noted for her roles in Italian operas
- Bonna Søndberg (born 1933), sang both mezzo-soprano and soprano roles at the Royal Danish Theatre until her retirement in 1987
- Ingeborg Steffensen (1888–1964), mezzo-soprano at the Royal Danish Theatre remembered for her performances of Carmen, Dalila and Azuncena

== U ==
- Emilie Ulrich (1872–1952), soprano in leading roles at the Royal Danish Theatre until 1917

== W ==
- Lilian Weber Hansen (1911–1987), mezzo-soprano at the Royal Danish Theatre for 25 years from 1940 remembered for her dramatic roles
- Ebba Wilton (1896–1949), foremost coloratura singer of her generation at the Royal Danish Theatre

== Z ==
- Josephine Zinck (1829–1919), mezzo-soprano in concerts at the Musikforeningen and in operas at the Royal Danish Theatre
- Marie Zinck (1789–1823), popular actress and singer who performed in plays, operas and operettas at the Royal Danish Theatre
