= Else Schøtt =

Danish operatic soprano (1895–1989)

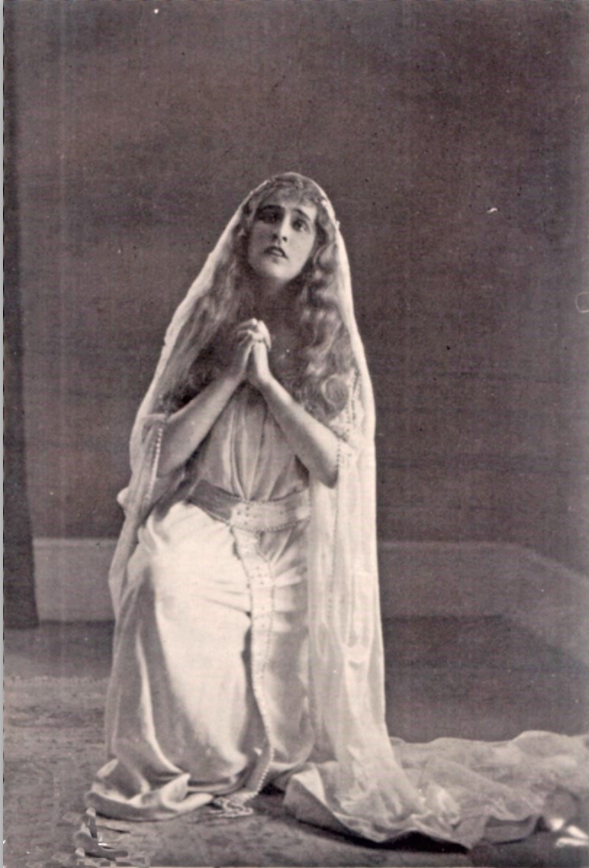
- Else Schøtt in Lohengrin (1923)
- Born: Else Marie Schøtt; 24 March 1895; Middelfart, Denmark
- Died: 29 April 1989 (aged 94); Copenhagen, Denmark
- Occupations: Opera singer, actress
- Years active: 1923 — 1945
- Parent(s): Jacob Peter Schøtt, Joanne Henriette née Lund

Else Marie Schøtt (24 March 1895 – 29 April 1989) was a Danish operatic soprano who performed at the Royal Danish Theatre from 1919 until she retired from the stage in 1951. Initially she frequently stood in for Tenna Kraft but became increasingly recognized as a significant performer in her own right, taking key roles in the works of Mozart, Verdi and Wagner as well in several Danish operas. In 1941, she played the title role in Paul von Klenau's Danish première of Elisabeth von England to wide acclaim. Schøtt was also a successful teacher, with pupils including Ruth Guldbæk and Tove Hyldgaard.

== Biography ==
Born in Middelfart on 24 March 1895, Else Marie Schøtt was the daughter of the innkeeper Jacob Peter Schøtt (1864–1917) and his wife Joanne Henriette née Lund (1859–1942). After schooling in Nørre Aaby, she took a preparatory course in singing given by the soprano Karen Marie Nielsen in Copenhagen. She then underwent thorough voice training under the Danish baritone Albert Høeberg and the Norwegian soprano Lona Gyldenhrone. She later became a student of the Czech opera singer Emil Burian in Prague and the Austrian Luise Reuss-Belce in Berlin. The Swedish actress Anna Norrie instructed her in drama. She completed her musical education at the Royal Danish Opera School (1921–1923), after which she was engaged by the Royal Theatre as an opera singer in July 1923.

Schøtt made her début at the Royal Danish Theatre as Elsa in Lohengrin in 1923. Initially she was frequently called upon to stand in for Tenna Kraft but as time went by, she gained a reputation as a competent performer in her own right, becoming one of the company's most popular singers. Among her most successful roles were the Countess in The Marriage of Figaro, Anna and Elvira in Don Giovanni, Pamina in The Magic Flute, Leonore in Fidelio and Elisabeth in Tannhäuser. She also performed in Danish operas, playing Michal in Nielsen's Saul og David and Ingeborg in Heise's Drot og marsk. She also performed as a guest in Stockholm, Lübeck and Prague. Her successful career included a number of concerts and broadcasts.

Else Schøott died on 29 April 1989 in Copenhagen.

== Awards ==
Schøtt was honoured by King Christian X in 1934 as a Royal Chamber Singer. In 1942 she received the Ingenio et Arti and in 1945 was presented the special award for successful women, the Tagea Brandt Rejselegat.
