= Saul og David =

1902 Danish opera by Carl Nielsen

- Opera by Carl Nielsen
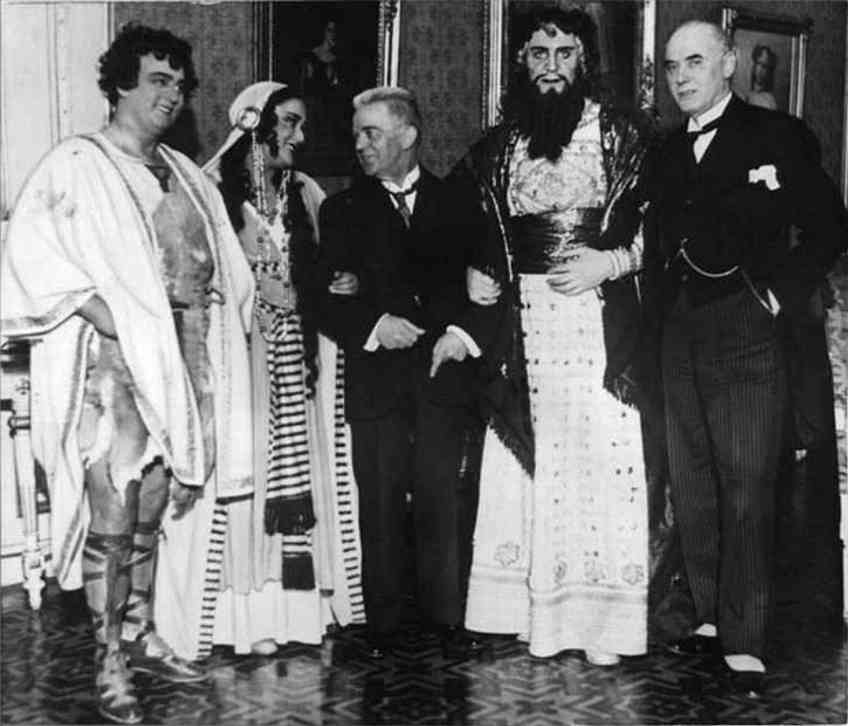
- Carl Nielsen at a performance of Saul and David in Stockholm in 1931
- Librettist: Einar Christiansen
- Language: Danish
- Based on: Saul and David in Books of Samuel
- Premiere: 28 November 1902; Royal Danish Theatre, Copenhagen

Saul og David (Saul and David) is the first of the two operas by the Danish composer Carl Nielsen. The four-act libretto, by Einar Christiansen, tells the Biblical story of Saul's jealousy of the young David, taken from the Books of Samuel. The first performance was at the Royal Danish Theatre, Copenhagen, on 28 November 1902.

The opera is one of Denmark's most important musical works for the theatre but it is difficult to stage as the dramatic episodes are often separated by longer, less dynamic sequences. The choral scenes are certainly among the opera's highlights. The music, which is both dramatic and lyrical, is free of any late Romantic effects. This might, however, explain why the work has not gained wider popularity.

== Composition history ==
The music was composed rather slowly over a period of two years, partly in Copenhagen, partly when Nielsen was in Rome on an extended stay between December 1899 and June 1900. Completed in April 1901, the work was submitted to the Royal Theatre for adjudication. The conductor, Johan Svendsen, recommended the opera should be performed at an early date, alluding to a "highly interesting work, bearing throughout the stamp of an independent gifted artist" who demonstrated "clarity and assurance".

== Performance history ==
The premiere on 28 November 1902 was received enthusiastically, at least by parts of the audience, as more than one reviewer spoke of continued applause by a group of the composer's friends and supporters. William Behrend from Politiken noted that Nielsen "conducted the performance with great assurance and quite natural zeal" but wondered whether the work would attract as much enthusiasm in future productions. Several other reviewers pointed out that it was hardly an opera in the classic sense but was more like an oratorio with its symphonic treatment, its cool dramatic approach and its large choral pieces.

There were only a few more performances of Saul og David in Copenhagen during Nielsen's lifetime and despite his own efforts to have it performed in Dresden and Vienna, it was not until November 1928 that it was staged abroad in Gothenburg. Nielsen, who conducted the last of the Gothenburg performances, noted in his scrapbook that the reviewers had received it enthusiastically.

The first UK production was in February 1977 in London by the University College Opera Society.

== Roles ==
Roles, voice types, premiere cast
| Role | Voice type | Premiere cast, 28 November 1902 Conductor: Carl Nielsen |
|---|---|---|
| Saul, King of Israel | bass-baritone | Niels Juel Simonsen |
| David, a shepherd | tenor | Vilhelm Herold |
| Michal, Saul's daughter | soprano | Emilie Ulrich |
| Jonathan, Saul's son | tenor | Peter Cornelius |
| Samuel, prophet of Israel | bass | Helge Nissen (Note: Originally Max Müller was to have sung the role of Samuel, but on the morning of the premiere he did not feel quite well, so arranged for himeslf and Helge Nissen to change roles.) |
| Abner, Saul's captain | bass-baritone | Max Müller |
| Abishai, David's companion | treble or soprano | Margrethe Lendrop |
| Witch of Endor | contralto | Elisabeth Dons |
Chorus: Israelites and soldiers

== Synopsis ==
=== Act 1 ===
Saul and his army await the arrival of Samuel at Gilgal for the sacrifice to the God of Israel before battle with the Philistines. But Samuel does not come by the appointed time, so Saul performs the sacrifice himself. Moments later Samuel arrives and denounces the king's actions, and pronounces God's curse upon Saul. Though Saul repents, Samuel remains resolute, and Saul falls into despair. Jonathan's friend David soothes Saul with his singing. Michal and David fall in love.

=== Act 2 ===
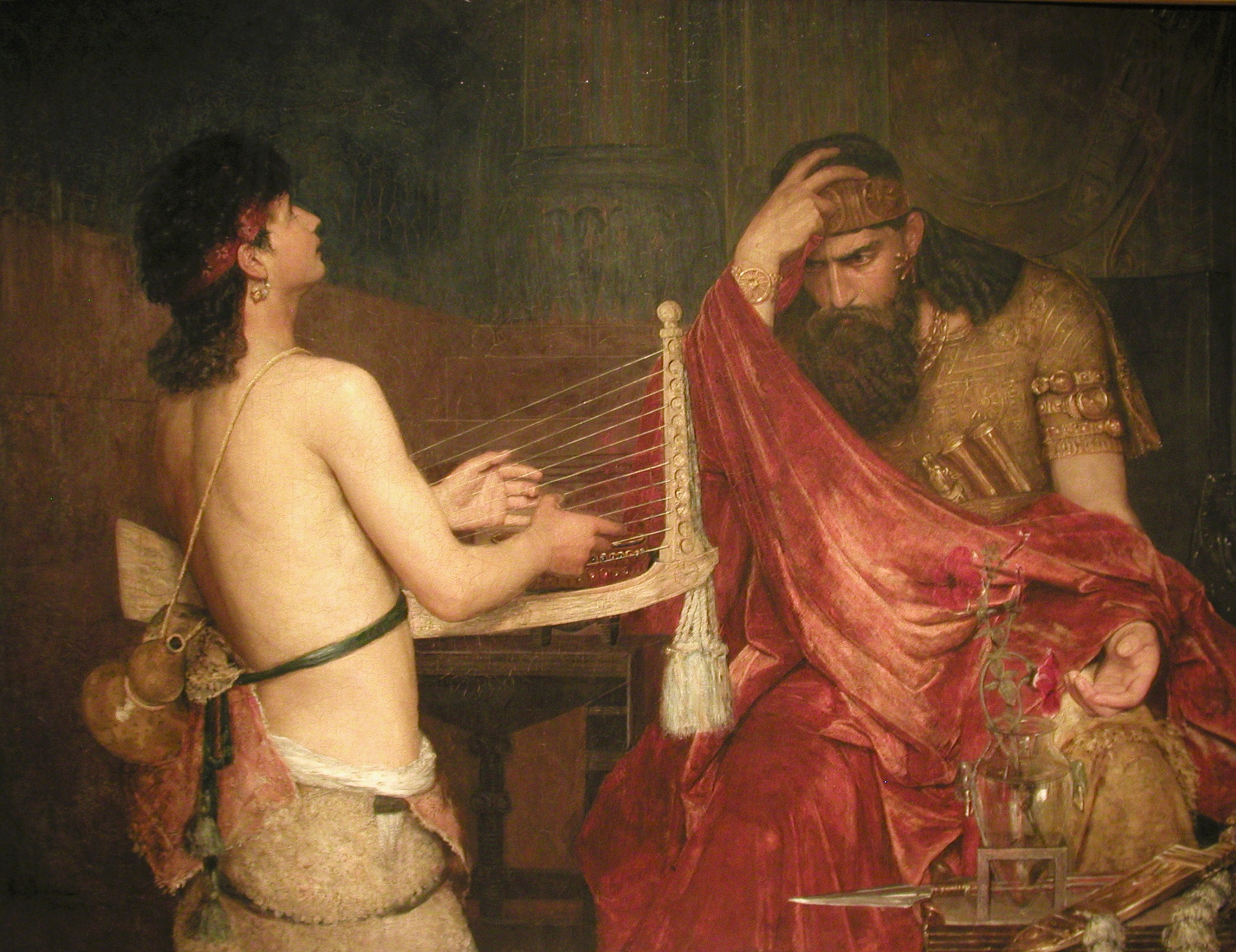
David och Saul by Ernst Josephson (1878)

Abner interrupts David, who is singing for Saul, and announces the challenge of the Philistine champion Goliath. Saul promises Michal's hand to whomever can defeat Goliath. David undertakes the challenge and succeeds. Saul immediately becomes jealous of the adulation David receives, and David flees to escape the king's anger.

=== Act 3 ===
David and Abishai come upon Saul's camp when all are asleep. David takes Saul's spear and water container to show he has been by the king but has not harmed him. He shouts from the hilltop to arouse the camp and pleads for reconciliation, but this is forestalled by the arrival of Samuel, who before dying anoints David the new king of Israel. Saul's jealousy flares again, and David flees with Michal.

=== Act 4 ===
Saul and Abner prevail upon the Witch of Endor to raise Samuel's spirit from the dead. Saul beseeches Samuel for help against the Philistines, but Samuel declares that God has abandoned Saul, that Saul and all his sons will die before the day is out. Battle ensues, and Jonathan is mortally wounded. Saul despairs and falls on his sword. The people acclaim David as their new king, but David is heart-broken by the deaths of Saul and Jonathan.

== Recordings ==
- Unicorn RHS 343/5: Boris Christoff, Willy Hartmann, Elisabeth Söderström, Alexander Young, Michael Langdon, Kim Borg, Bodil Gobel, Sylvia Fisher, Mogens Berg, Kirsten Buhl-Moller; Danish Radio Symphony Orchestra and Chorus; John Alldis Choir; Jascha Horenstein, conductor (sung in English)
- Danacord DACOCD 357: Mogens Wedel, Odd Wolstad, Inge Frey, Ruth Guldbæk, Niels Møller, Otte Svendsen; Danish Radio Symphony Orchestra and Chorus; Thomas Jensen, conductor (sung in Danish, 1960)
- Chandos 8911(2): Aage Haugland, Anne Gjevang, Christian Christiansen, Jurgen Klint, Kurt Westi, Peter Lindroos, Tina Kiberg; Danish National Choir; Danish National Symphony Orchestra; Neeme Järvi, conductor (sung in Danish, 1990)

== Notes and references ==
Notes
