= Lilly Lamprecht =

Danish operatic soprano (1887–1976)

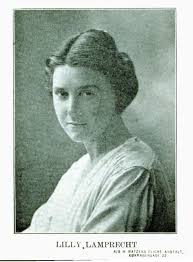
- Lamprecht in 1916
- Born: Lilly Camradt; 11 November 1887; Hillerød, Denmark
- Died: 5 September 1976 (aged 88); Frederiksberg, Denmark
- Occupation: Actress
- Years active: 1911 — 1933
- Spouse: Johan Frederik (Fritz) Wendt Lamprecht (divorced)
- Parent(s): Johannes Ludvig Camradt, Charlotte Johanne Kruuse

Lilly Lamprecht née Camradt (1887–1976) was a Danish operatic soprano. She made her début at the Royal Danish Theatre in 1911 in the title role of Liden Kirsten. Her roles included Madame Butterfly, Cherubino in The Marriage of Figaro and Micaëla in Carmen. She left the company in 1931 but returned in 1933 to perform Marguerite in Faust. Lamprecht was honoured as a Royal Chamber Singer in 1922.

== Biography ==
Born in Hillerød on 11 November 1887, Lilly Camradt was the daughter of the pharmacist Johannes Ludvig Camradt (1845–1928) and his wife Charlotte Johanne née Kruuse (1849–1932). In 1910 she married the actor Johan Frederik (Fritz) Wendt Lamprecht (1883–1941) but the marriage was later dissolved. After training in voice under Elisabeth Dons and in drama under Holger Hofman, she entered the Royal Theatre School in 1909. Shortly afterwards, she was given a minor stage role as a singing page in Oehlenschläger's Correggio.

In 1911, she made her official début singing the title role in Hartmann's opera Liden Kirsten, a role she frequently sang, including once at an outdoor performance in Jægersborg Dyrehave. She became one of the theatre's most active performers, singing Nedda in Leoncavallo's Pagliacci, Sophie in Der Rosenkavalier, Aase in Drot og Marsk and Rosina in The Barber of Seville. She was particularly effective both as an actress and as a singer as Anuna in Richard Strauss's Salome. Lambrecht was the first in Denmark to perform the role and was also the first to perform Marie in Alban Berg's Wozzeck, on this occasion at a concert. She retired from the Royal Theatre in July 1931 but in September 1933 performed Margrethe in Faust three times as a guest.

Lamprecht died 5 September 1976 in Frederiksberg, Denmark.

== Awards ==
Lamprecht was honoured by King Christian X with the title of Royal Chamber Singer in 1922 and was awarded the Ingenio et Arti in 1937. In 1935, she received the special award for women, the Tagea Brandt Rejselegat.
