= Ingeborg Steffensen =

Danish opera singer

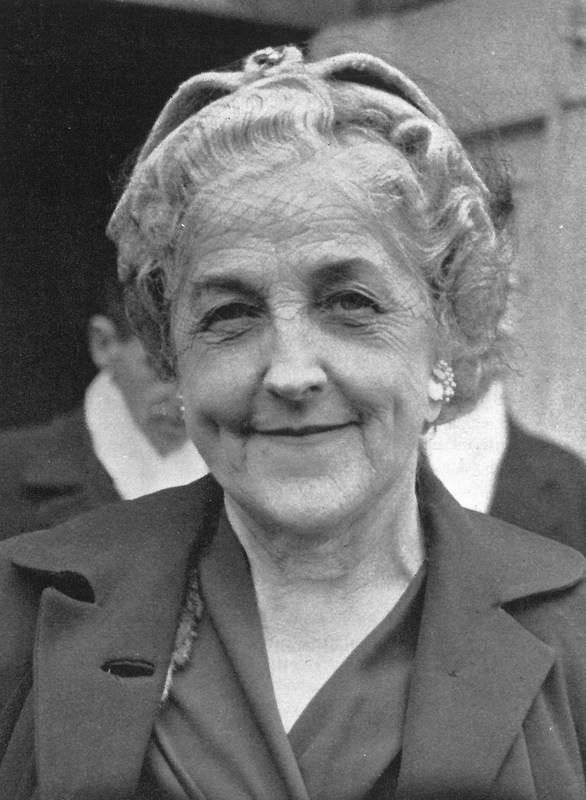
- Born: Ingeborg Steffensen; 4 June 1888; Copenhagen, Denmark
- Died: 7 January 1964 (aged 75)
- Occupation: Opera singer
- Years active: 1915 — 1956
- Spouse(s): Knud Aage Haldvig, Alfred Frederik Oxholm Holck, Peder Albert Lynged
- Children: 2
- Parent(s): William Georg Valdemar Steffensen, Emma Julie née Weitemeyer

Ingeborg Steffensen (4 June 1888 – 7 January 1964) was a Danish mezzo-soprano opera singer who made her début at the Royal Danish Theatre in 1915 as Annchen in Carl Maria von Weber's Jægerbruden. She was particularly successful in the title role of Carmen, as Dalila in Samson and Delilah and Azuncena in Il trovatore. She also sang the soprano Fru Ingeborg in Peter Heise's Danish opera Drot og marsk. After her retirement from the stage in 1956, she continued to give concerts and sang oratorios.

== Biography ==
Born on 4 June 1888 in Copenhagen. Ingeborg Steffensen was the daughter of the chief foreman William Georg Valdemar Steffensen (1846–1924) and Emma Julie née Weitemeyer (1847–1901). She was married three times: from 1914 to 1921 with the civil engineer Knud Aage Haldvig, from 1925 to 1932 with the review writer Alfred Frederik Oxholm Holck, and from 1934 to 1938 with the concert master Peder Albert Lynged. She had two children: Fritze (1919) and Steffen (1926). Encouraged by her German mother's interest in music, Steffensen received early voice training from the soprano Sophie Keller. She later trained under the Norwegian soprano Borghild Langaard.

Steffensen's début was at a concert of her own in 1909, after which she mastered no less than 22 operatic roles. She first performed at the Royal Danish Theatre in 1909 as Annchen in Jægerbruden but then for the next ten years sang operetta and opera roles at Det Ny Teater. She was engaged by the Royal Theatre from 1919 until her retirement in 1956, singing the main mezzo-soprano roles in Lohengrin, Tristan und Isolde, Aida, Don Carlos, Carmen and many more. She often performed together with the outstanding soprano Tenna Kraft.

In later years, she excelled in comic roles such as mothers and witches. In 1950, Svend S. Schultz specially wrote the lead role of mother for her in his opera Høst, bringing her additional fame. She performed widely in concerts and performances outside Denmark, especially in Austria, Germany, Norway and Sweden. For many years after her retirement, she continued to perform in concerts.

== Awards ==
In 1931 she was honoured by King Christian X with the title of Kongelig kammersangerinde or Royal Chamber Singer while in 1934 she received the Ingenio et Arti.
