= Ingeborg Nørregaard Hansen =

Danish operatic soprano (1874–1941)

Ingeborg Nørregaarf Hansen
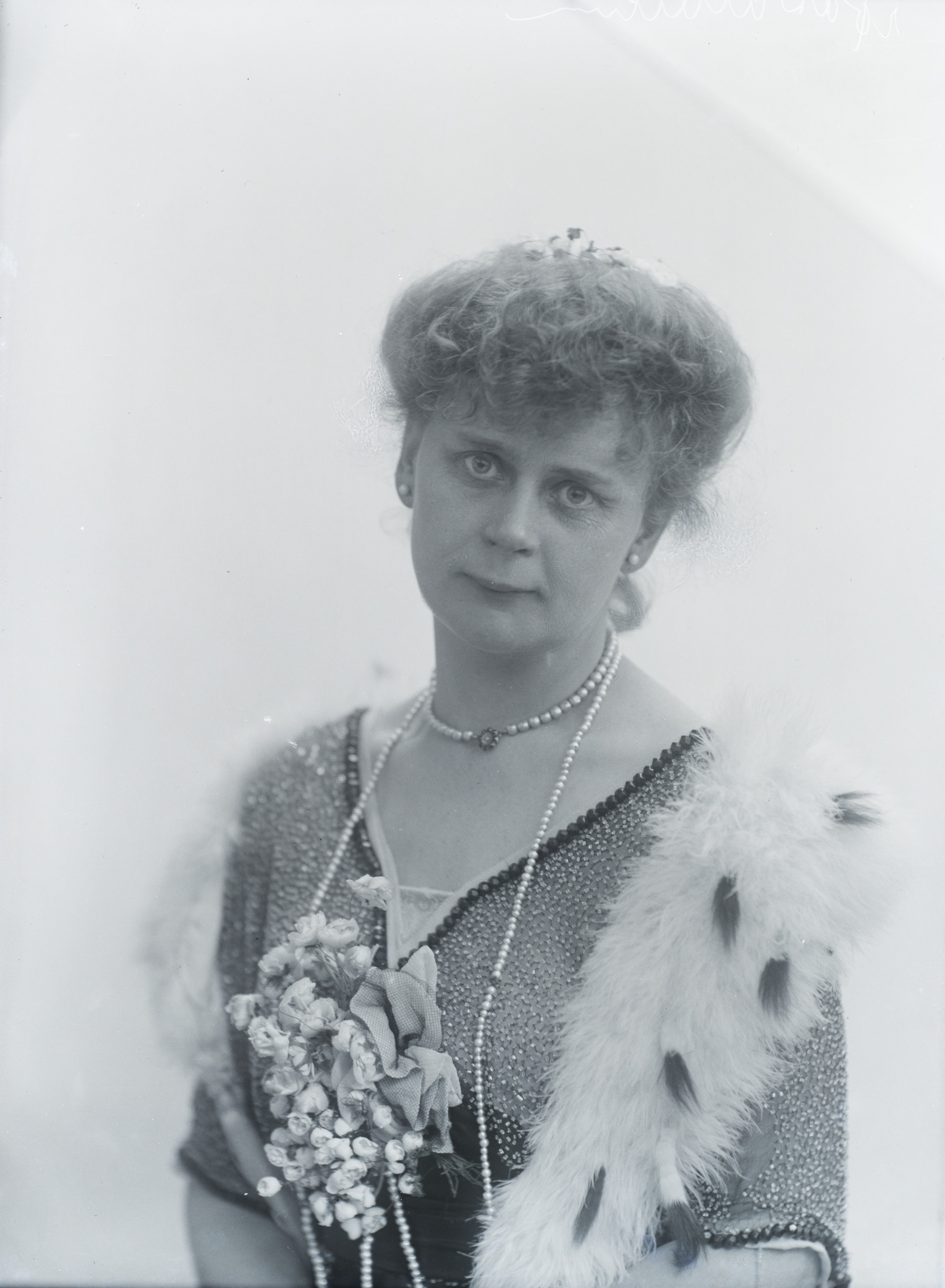
- Born: 25 June 1874; Frederiksberg, Denmark
- Died: 1 August 1941 (aged 67); Copenhagen, German-occupied Denmark

Ingeborg Nørregaard Hansen (1874–1941) was a Danish operatic soprano who débuted at the Royal Danish Theatre in 1899 as Senta in The Flying Dutchma. In 1901, she was engaged by the company, initially standing in for other singers. Over the years, she developed powerful interpretations of the romantic soprano roles in Wagner's operas, becoming one of the company's leading Wagnerian performers by her retirement in 1926.

== Biography ==
Born on 25 June 1874 in the Copenhagen district of Frederiksberg, Ingeborg Nørregaard Hansen was the daughter of the lawyer Sophus Vilhelm Hansen (1834–1903) and his unmarried partner Alvilda Christine Nørregaard (1840–1920). She was trained in Denmark under Sophie Keller and in Dresden under Hermann Kutzschbach. In 1899, she made her début at the Royal Danish Theatre as Senta in The Flying Dutchman. In 1901, Nørregaard Hansen secured an engagement at the Royal Theatre, which she maintained until her retirement in 1926. Her last appearance was, in fact, as a guest in 1930.

It turned out that her début in a Wagnerian opera paved the way for the remainder of her career as after standing in for absent performers, she developed proficiency in the romantic female roles in Wagner's operas. These included Elsa in Lohengrin, Elisabeth in Tannhäuser, Sieglinde in Die Walküre and Eva in Die Meistersinger von Nürnberg.

Ingeborg Nørregaard Hansen died in Copenhagen on 9 August 1941 and is buried in Holmen Cemetery.

== Awards ==
Nørregaard Hansen was elevated to the title of Royal Chamber Singer by King Christian X in 1919. In 1926, she was awarded the Ingenio et Arti.
