= Ellen Beck (soprano) =

Danish mezzo-soprano concert singer (1873–1953)

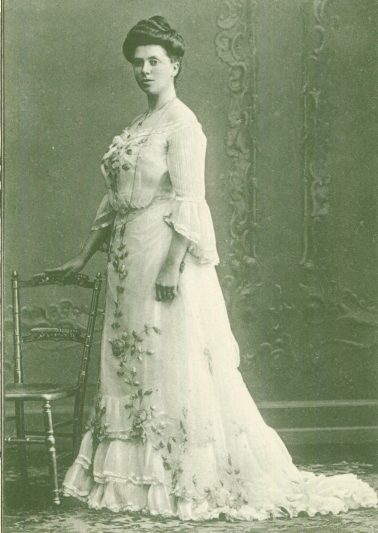
Ellen Beck, c. 1904.

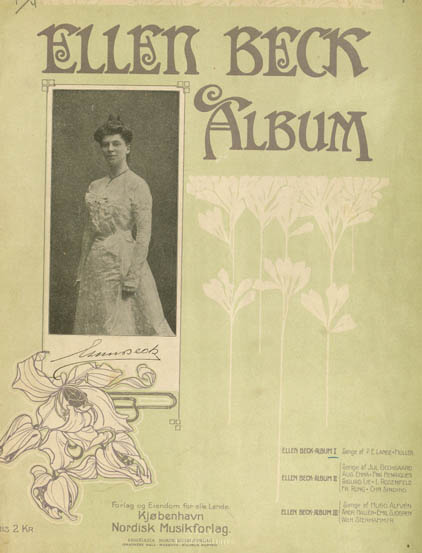
Ellen Beck Album (1904)

Ellen Nathalie Nina Beck (1873–1953) was a Danish mezzo-soprano who in the early 20th century was one of the country's best known concert performers. She also frequently gave recitals abroad, appearing in the Promenade Concerts in London's Royal Albert Hall. In 1906 she was honoured by King Frederik VIII as a Royal Chamber Singer (Kongelige Kammersangerinde), a title usually reserved for opera singers. Beck later became a prominent voice teacher.

== Biography ==
Born on 3 October 1873 in Lerchenborg Manor near Kalundborg, Ellen Nathalie Nina Beck was the daughter of the State Councilor Eckardt Frederik Beck (1827–1896) and Julie Louise née Fabricius (1843–1922). Her mother, who was the sister of the composer Jacob Fabricius, encouraged music in the home. When the Swedish opera singer Algot Lange (1859–1904) heard Ellen Beck singing, he offered to train her. She later became a student of the tenor Vittore Devilliers (1849–1932) in Paris.

In 1891, she performed in a concert in Kalundborg, sang in Roskilde Cathedral in 1898, and gave her first concert in Copenhagen in 1898 to considerable acclaim. She went on to give recitals throughout Denmark, accompanied on the piano by Johanne Stockmarr and Agnes Adler. In Copenhagen she frequently appeared in concerts at Palæet and at Cæciliaforeningen. As early as 1906, Frederik VIII honoured her as a Royal Chamber Singer, the only concert performer ever to receive the title.

Beck travelled widely, performing throughout Scandinavia and in orchestral concerts in Russia, Germany, Switzerland, France, Ireland and Great Britain. She appeared with many celebrated conductors, including Tor Aulin, Richard Strauss and Henry Wood. Her repertoire extended from popular romantic music to operatic arias. Her Ellen Beck Album includes works by her favourite composers Peter Lange-Müller, Peter Heise and Victor Bendix. Beck had a number of successful pupils, mostly women including Marguerite Viby and Erika Voigt.

Ellen Beck died in Copenhagen on 7 November 1953 and is buried in Assistens Cemetery.
