= Kongelige kammersangere =

Kongelige kammersangere or The Royal Chamber Singer is a prestigious title given to Danish Opera singers by the monarch. Only about 50 people have received the award since it was started in 1700. The first non-native Danish person who was appointed as a royal chamber singer was the Italian Giuseppe Siboni, who in 1819 received Danish citizenship and became director of the Royal Theatre.

== List of Honorees ==
=== Presented by Frederik VI ===
- ca. 1819 – Giuseppe Siboni (1780–1839)
- ca. 1821 – Josephine Fröhlich (1803–1878)

=== Presented by Christian VIII ===
- 1841 – Ida Henriette da Fonseca (1802–1858)
- 1843 – Catharine Simonsen (née Rysslander, 1816–1849)

=== Presented by Frederik VII ===
- 1854 – Jørgen Christian Hansen (1812–1880)
- 1858 – Leocadie Gerlach (1827–1919, née Bergnehr)

=== Presented by Christian IX ===
- 1864 – Charlotte Bournonville (1832–1911)
- 1866 – Peter Schram (1819–1895)
- 1874 – Niels Juel Simonsen (1846–1906)
- 1879 – Anna Henrietta Levinsohn (1839–1899)
- 1888 – Elisabeth Dons (1864–1942)
- 1894 – Sophie Keller (née Rung, 1850–1929)
- 1901 – Vilhelm Herold (1865–1937)

=== Presented by Frederik VIII ===
- 1906 – Ellen Beck (1873–1953)
- 1906 – Emilie Ulrich (1872–1952)
- 1907 – Peter Cornelius (née Cornelius Petersen, 1865–1934)
- 1907 – Helge Nissen (1871–1926)
- 1907 – Ida Møller (1872–1947)
- 1908 – Johanne Krarup-Hansen (1870–1958)

=== Presented by Christian X ===
- 1914 – Tenna Kraft (née Frederiksen, 1885–1954)
- 1915 – Margrethe Lendrop (née Boeck, 1873–1920)
- 1916 – Johanne Brun (da) (née Prieme, 1874–1954)
- 1917 – Albert Høeberg (1879–1949)
- 1918 – Niels Hansen (1880–1969)
- 1919 – Ingeborg Nørregaard Hansen (1874–1941)
- 1922 – Lilly Lamprecht (1886–1976)
- 1930 – Lauritz Melchior (1890–1973)
- 1931 – Ingeborg Steffensen (1888–1964)
- 1931 – Poul Wiedemann (1890–1969)
- 1934 – Holger Byrding (1891–1980)
- 1934 – Holger Bruusgaard (1884–1968)
- 1934 – Else Schøtt (1895–1989)
- 1934 – Per Biørn (1887–1944)
- 1936 – Helge Rosvaenge (1897–1972)
- 1939 – Einar Nørby (1896–1983)
- 1941 – Ebba Wilton (1896–1951)
- 1941 – Ely Hjalmar (1892–1952)
- 1946 – Marius Jacobsen (1894–1961)
- 1946 – Thyge Thygesen (1904–1972)
- 1946 – Else Brems (1908–1995)
- 1946 – Edith Oldrup (1912–1999)

=== Presented by Frederik IX ===
- 1947 – Henry Skjær (1899–1991)
- 1949 – Stefan Islandi (1907–1993)
- 1949 – Dorothy Larsen (1911–1990)
- 1950 – Erik Sjøberg (1909–1973)
- 1950 – Lilian Weber Hansen (1911–1987)
- 1957 – Ruth Guldbæk (1924–2006)
- 1959 – Otte Svendsen (1918–2008)

=== Presented by Margrethe II ===
- 1974 – Ib Hansen (1928–2013)
- 1985 – Aage Haugland (1944–2000)
- 1998 – Inga Nielsen (1946–2008)
- 2006 – Stig Fogh Andersen (born 1950)
- 2010 – Tina Kiberg (born 1958)
