= Else Brems =

Danish operatic contralto (1908–1995)

Else Brems (16 July 1908 – 1995) was a Danish contralto opera singer who is remembered in particular for her interpretations of Carmen, a role she performed not only in Denmark but in Vienna, Warsaw, Budapest, Stockholm and London.

== Early life and education ==
The daughter of the concert singer Anders Lauridsen Brems (1877–1974) and the pianist Gerda Emilie Rasmussen (1880-1967), Else was born in Copenhagen on 16 July 1908. She was raised in a musical family. Her maternal grandfather, Peter Rasmussen, was an organist and composer, her uncle Alfred Rasmussen a French hornist, and her father, initially a clarinettist, later became known as a singer, premiering many of Carl Nielsen's songs.

It was her father who first taught her to sing, assisted by her mother, who accompanied her on the piano. When Brems was 17, she decided to become a professional singer. Her father took her to Rome to study under the celebrated baritone Mattia Battistini who was delighted to instruct her. She then went to Paris where she acquired the authentic accent which can be heard in her French-language performances.

== Career ==
She was only 20 when she first performed in Copenhagen. Thanks to her successful début, she went to Berlin to be trained by the American opera singer Sara Cahier, famous for her Carmen performances. After perfecting her Carmen role in French, when she was 22 Brems returned to Denmark to appear as Carmen at the Royal Danish Theatre. Her reputation was firmly established as she performed under the direction of Johannes Poulsen and the German conductor Leo Blech.

In 1933, she sang at a private concert in Chicago where she received high acclaim, one critic commenting that she would be "the world's greatest Carmen". She went on to study in New York under Enrico Rosati who had trained Beniamino Gigli. After performing in concerts in New York and Chicago, she returned to Europe where she played Carmen over 100 times in Copenhagen alone. In Vienna, she performed the role in German under Bruno Walter, in London in English, and in Prague, Budapest, Warsaw and Stockholm in French.

In 1940, she married the Icelandic tenor Stefán Íslandi with whom she frequently performed. She spent the war years in Scandinavia, performing in Denmark and Sweden. One of her most appreciated roles in Copenhagen during the war was as Bess in Gershwin's Porgy and Bess in which the actors blackened their faces, a feature which was not welcomed by the German occupying forces. Following the liberation of Denmark in 1945, Brems contributed to the celebrations by playing Elisabeth in the patriotic Elvehøj. After the war, she toured mainly in Denmark but also performed as Carmen in Covent Garden in 1948.

Brems also performed in many other roles while at Copenhagen's Royal Theatre. These included Orpheus in Gluck's Orpheus and Eurydice (1939), Lola in Pietro Mascagni's Cavalleria rusticana (1946), Cornelia in Handel's Julius Caesar (1947), Cherubino in The Marriage of Figaro (1948), and Lucretia in Benjamin Britten's The Rape of Lucretia (1955). Her last role at the Royal Theatre was that of the mother in Offenbach's The Tales of Hoffmann in 1961. In addition to opera, Brems was a successful concert performer, singing works by Bach and Handel and frequently appearing as an acclaimed lied singer, interpreting works by Schubert and Brahms. She also sang songs by Ravel and Debussy and by the Danish composer Peter Lange-Müller. After officially leaving the theatre in 1962, she worked as a singing coach until her retirement in 1978. Until 1967 she was dean of Det Jyske Musikkonservatorium after which she joined Copenhagen University's Musikvidenskabeligt Institut where one of her most successful students was the soprano opera singer Elisabeth Meyer-Topsøe.

Else Brems died on 4 October 1995 in Copenhagen and is buried in Garnisons Cemetery.

== Awards ==
In addition to receiving the Tagea Brandt Travel Scholarship in 1945, Brems was elevated to the status of Royal Court Singer by Christian X in 1946. In 1953, she received Denmark's highest award for artists, writers and performers, the Ingenio et Arti.

== Discography ==
The comprehensive discography compiled by René Aagaard in 2013 contains 42 studio recordings (from 1932 to 1960), 20 radio recordings (1934 to 1961) and 11 republished recordings on EP, LP or CD.
