= Maskarade =

Opera by Carl Nielsen

- Opera by Carl Nielsen
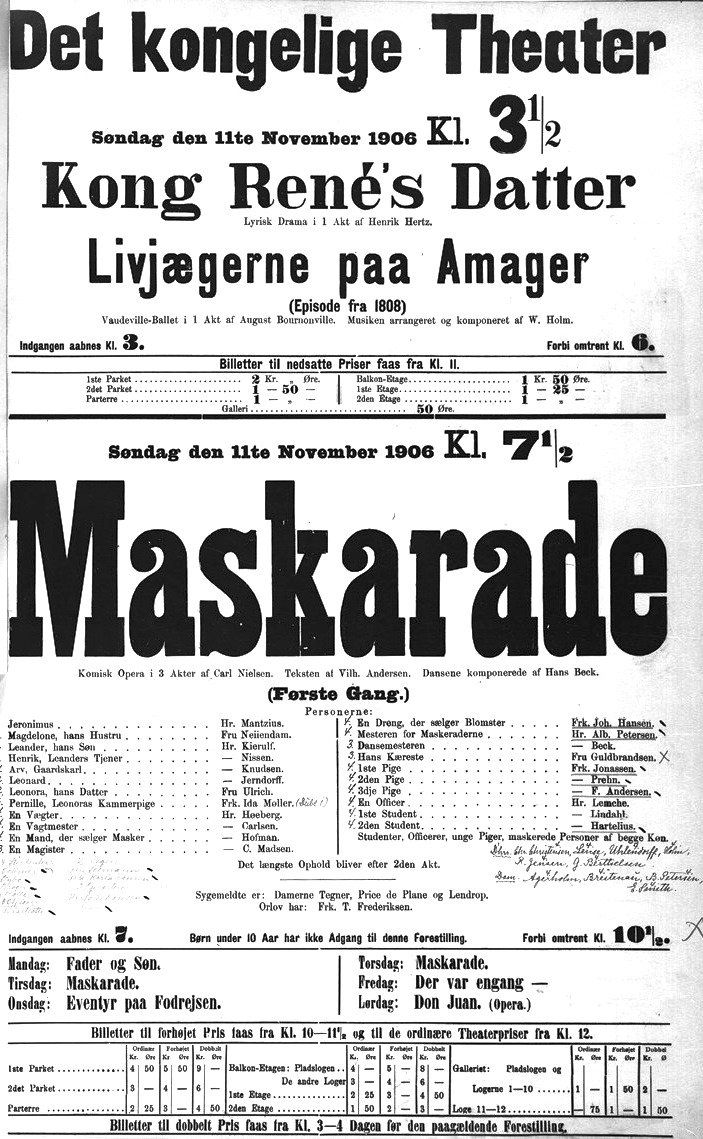
- Poster for the premiere performance
- Librettist: Vilhelm Andersen
- Language: Danish
- Premiere: 11 November 1906; Royal Danish Theatre, Copenhagen

Maskarade (Masquerade) is an opera in three acts by Carl Nielsen to a Danish libretto by Vilhelm Andersen, based on the comedy by Ludvig Holberg. It was first performed on 11 November 1906 at Royal Danish Theatre, Copenhagen. Maskarade has enjoyed enduring popularity in Denmark where it is considered to be the country's national opera.

== Background and performance history ==
Nielsen first considered writing an opera based on Holberg's play Maskarade around the turn of the 20th century. He contacted Vilhelm Andersen (1864–1953) whom he knew from his student days, hoping to persuade him to write a libretto. Andersen initially refused but finally agreed, allowing Nielsen to start composing in May 1904. The Royal Theatre scheduled the opera even before it was finished. In fact, Nielsen completed the overture only on 3 November, a week before the opera's premiere.

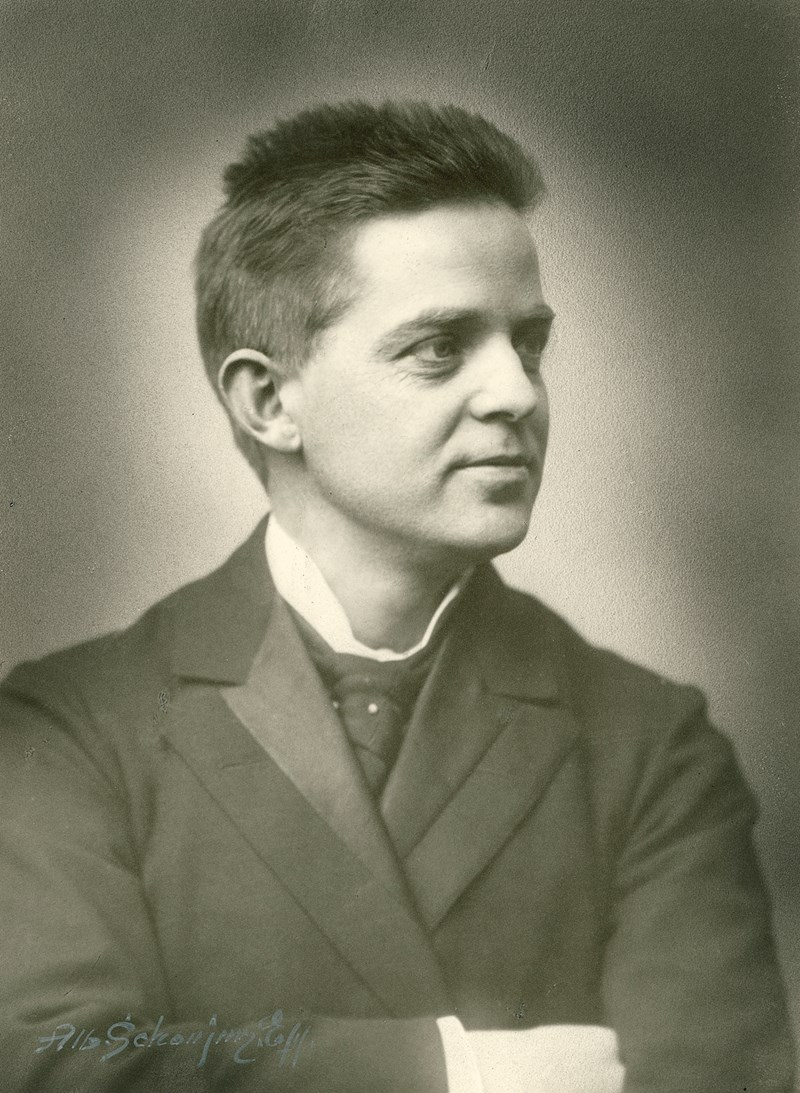
Carl Nielsen in 1901

The world premiere of Maskarade took place at Royal Danish Theatre in Copenhagen on 11 November 1906. It was a resounding success from the start with an exceptional run of 25 performances over its first four months. Reviews in the press were however mixed, the consensus being that the first act was the best, the second was rather weak and the third lacked theatrical clarity although the music was brilliant. Announcement of plans to turn Holberg's classical comedy into an opera buffa had met with dismay in Danish literary circles, but the opera was immediately popular, more so than the play itself. Now considered to be Denmark's national opera, it has enjoyed lasting success in the country, attributable to its many strophic songs, its dances and its underlying "old Copenhagen" atmosphere. In 2006, Denmark's Ministry of Culture named it one of Denmark's twelve greatest musical works.

The opera did not premiere in the United States until 1972 when it was performed by the St. Paul Opera in Minnesota with conductor Igor Buketoff, Mary Beth Peil as Leonora, and Clinton Ware as Leander. The first reported New York performance was by the Bronx Opera Company in 1983. It was performed in the US again in 2014, when it had its Chicago premiere on 18 January at the Vittum Theater performed by the Vox3 Collective. Maskarade received a major international revival in 2005 in a new production by David Pountney which was performed at the Bregenz Festival in August of that year and travelled to the Royal Opera House the following month for its first performance by the company. The opera had been previously performed in the UK at London's Morley College in 1983 and in Leeds by Opera North in 1990.

Despite its popularity in his home country, Nielsen was not entirely satisfied with the work, citing structural weakness in the final two acts; but he never got around to revising the work. The overture and the ballet from the third act ("Dance of the Cockerels") are performed frequently, as noted by the Carl Nielsen Society, which states that the overture is one of Nielsen's most widely performed works at concerts in Europe and North America.

== Roles ==
Roles, voive types, premiere cast
Role	Voice type	Premiere cast, 11 November 1906 Conductor: Carl Nielsen
Jeronimus, a citizen of Copenhagen	bass-baritone	Karl Mantzius
Magdelone, his wife	alto or mezzo-soprano	Jonna Neiiendam
Leander, their son	tenor	Hans Kierulf
Henrik, Leander's valet	bass-baritone	Helge Nissen
Arv, Jeronimus' servant	tenor	Lars Knudsen
Leonard, a citizen of Slagelse	tenor or baritone	Peter Jerndorff
Leonora, his daughter	soprano	Emilie Ulrich
Pernille, Leonora's maid	soprano or mezzo-soprano	Ida Møller/Margrethe Lindrop
Mask Vendor	baritone	
Doorman at the Playhouse	bass	
A Tutor	bass	
Night Watchman	bass	
Master of the Masquerade	bass	Albert Petersen
Masqueraders, Students, Girls, Officers

== Synopsis ==
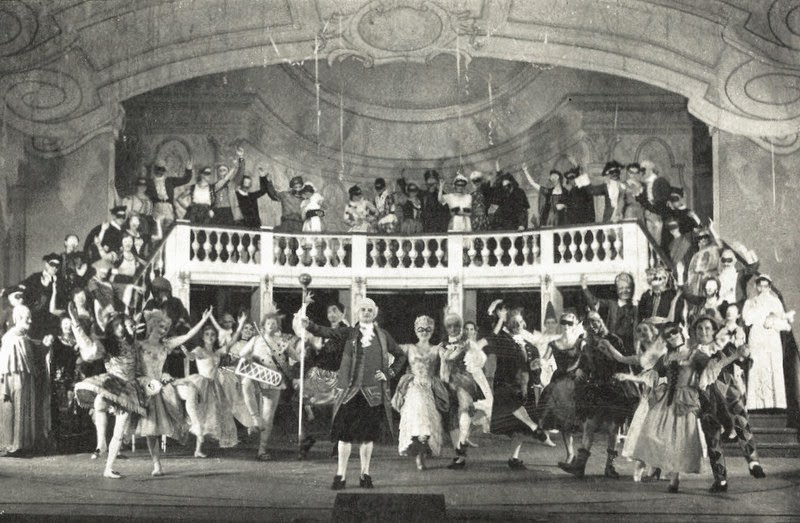
Maskarade at the Jyske Opera in Aarhus (1954)

Time: Spring 1723
Place: Copenhagen

The story revolves around Leander and Leonora, two young people who meet fortuitously at a masquerade ball, swear their undying love for each other and exchange rings. The following day, Leander tells his valet Henrik of his newfound love. He becomes distraught when reminded by Henrik that his parents have betrothed him in marriage to Leonora, the daughter of Leonard from remote Slagelse. Things get complicated when Leonard himself, whose daughter Leonora is the other part of this arrangement, comes complaining to Leander's father that Leonora is in love with someone she met at the masquerade the previous night. In the third act, all is resolved when the various parties slip off to the night's masquerade, where all is revealed to everyone's mutual satisfaction.

== Commemorative performances ==
As part of the celebrations of the 150th anniversary of Carl Nielsen's birth, the Royal Theatre in Copenhagen staged eleven well-received performances of Maskarade from March to May 2015. The Royal Danish Opera's schedule for 2015 includes performances of a chamber version of the opera in three other locations in Denmark from mid-July to early September. The Maskarade overture has been included in the first night of Britain's BBC Proms on 17 July 2015.

== Recordings ==
- Grondahl (conductor), on Danacord, 1954
- Frandsen (conductor), on Unicorn, 1977
- Schirmer (conductor), on Decca, Recorded 1996, 1998
- Schirmer (conductor), from Bregenz on Capriccio, 2005
- Schønwandt (conductor), from Copenhagen on Dacapo, 2006
