= Ebba Wilton =

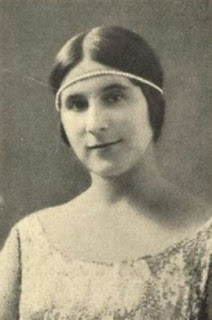
- Born: Ebba Anna Elisabeth Pedersen; 13 December 1896; Stevns Municipality, Denmark
- Died: 1 April 1951 (aged 54); Gentofte, Denmark
- Occupation: Opera singer
- Years active: 1911 — 1949
- Spouse: Einer Wilton
- Parent(s): Carl Christian Pedersen, Karen Marie Hansigne Madsen

Ebba Anna Elisabeth Wilton, also Ebba Dane, née Pedersen (1896–1951) was a Danish operatic soprano who sang at the Royal Danish Theatre from 1924 to 1949. The foremost coloratura singer of her generation, her principal roles included Olympia in The Tales of Hoffmann, Zerlina in Don Giovanni, Susanna in The Marriage of Figaro, Gilda in Rigoletto and Ännchen in Der Freischütz. She made guest appearances in Berlin, Paris and Riga. Her recordings from 1924 to 1928 are now available as a CD.

== Biography ==
Born in Lille Heddinge, Stevns Municipality, on 13 December 1896, Ebba Anna Elisabeth Pedersen was the daughter of the restaurant owner Carl Christian Pedersen (1869–1939) and his wife Karen Marie Hansigne née Madsen (1869–1935). Her musical talents developed early, allowing her to made her first appearance when she was just 15. She attended the Music Conservatory as a student of Poul Bang and received training from her husband-to-be, the tenor Einer Wilton (1888–1932). They married in June 1922.

When she was 15, she joined the choir at the Casino Theatre where Gerda Christophersen noticed her potential and encouraged her to join the trio she put together. In 1919, she performed in the revue Capriciosa as Ebba Dane but it was not until she married Einar Wilton that her voice really started to improve. It was thanks to her husband's training that in December 1924, she made her début at the Royal Danish Theatre as Queen of the Night in The Magic Flute. The same year, she appeared Tivoli's concert hall. Recognized for her voice rather than her acting, she went on to take the key soprano roles in the classical operas as well as in Danish works, including as Aase in Peter Heise's Drot og Marsk. She retired on the occasion of her 25th Jubilee in 1949, singing Rosina in The Barber of Seville.

Ebba Wilton died in Gentofte on 1 April 1951.

== Awards ==
Ebba Wilton was honoured as a Royal Chamber Singer by King Christian X in 1941.
