= Niels Hansen =

Niels Hansen may refer to:

- Niels Hansen (German footballer) (born 1983), German football midfielder
- Niels Hansen (diplomat) (1924–2015), former German ambassador to Israel
- Niels Ebbesen Hansen (1866–1950), Danish horticulturist and botanist
- Niels Flemming Hansen (born 1974), Danish politician and MF
- Niels Jacob Hansen (1880–1969), Danish opera singer who sang tenor
- Niels Wal Hansen (1892-1972), Danish Olympic sailor
- Niels Christian Hansen, Danish portrait and genre painter
- Niels-Jørgen Hansen, Danish darts player
- Niels Peder Hansen (1901–1987), Danish football goalkeeper who played on the Denmark national football team

== See also ==
- Goldfields Basketball Stadium, a basketball stadium in Kalgoorlie-Boulder, Australia, formerly known as Niels Hansen Stadium
