= Elisabeth Dons =

Danish operatic mezzo-soprano (1864–1942)

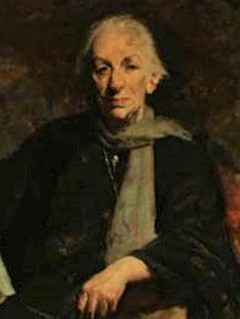
Dons, 1932, by Herman Vedel

Elisabeth Caroline Cathrine Dons (1864–1942) was a Danish operatic mezzo-soprano who performed at the Royal Danish Theatre from 1885. Thanks to training in Paris, she was later able to take on soprano roles, becoming Denmark's operatic prima donna by the 1890s. She also worked as a voice teacher.

== Biography ==
Born on 19 April 1864 in Bjergsted in the north east of Zealand, Elisabeth Dons was the daughter of the landowner Captain Julius Dons (1830–1908) and Augusta Mariane Sievers (1833–1908). On the recommendation of a family friend, her parents enrolled her in the Royal Music Conservatory where she studied under two of the best singers of the times, Leocadie Gerlach and Sophie Keller. After hearing her sing one evening, Johan Svendsen, who headed the Royal Danish Orchestra, invited her to complete her studies at the Royal Theatre where she was taught by Emil Poulsen (1842–1911).

When only 21, she made her début in the demanding role of Azucena in Il trovatore, immediately gaining acclaim in the newspapers for the ease with which she moved from one register to another. Her most successful part soon became Amneris in Verdi's Aida. With her slim, southern-looking figure, her aristocratic looks, her volcanic temperament and her masterly delivery, she excelled as an Egyptian princess, inspiring J. F. Willumsen to create a sculpture of her in this role for the theatre's foyer. In 1888 at the age of 24, she was given the title of Kongelige Kammersangere (royal chamber singer), putting her on a par with earlier stars such as Betty Hennings (1850–1939).

With financial support from the theatre's director Edvard Fallesen, she spent several periods in Paris where she received voice training from Mathilde Marchesi, who succeeded in training her to reach the higher notes usually sung by sopranos. Her stage performance also improved with guidance from Désirée Artôt. As a result, she was able to perform soprano parts such as Julie in Gounod's Roméo et Juliette, where she was particularly dramatic in the final scene. With her aristocratic looks, she was however less successful as Carmen.

As she grew older, she experienced difficulty in reaching the high soprano notes, preferring to return to contralto roles such as the Witch of Endor in Carl Nielsen's Saul og David. Her final role, in 1905, was Orfeo in Gluck's Orfeo ed Euridice, a part which appeared to fit her perfectly with its tragically dramatic stance. Dons was also a competent teacher, training successors such as Ingeborg Steffensen.

In 1915, she was awarded the prestigious medal Ingenio et Arti. She spent the remainder of her life in Frederiksberg where she lived together with the medical specialist Johanne Feilberg (1878–1960). Her friends included cultural figures such as Anne Marie Carl-Nielsen, J. F. Willumsen, Sophus Claussen and Vilhelm Wanscher.

Elisabeth Dons died in Taarbæk on 2 May 1942 and is buried in Frederiksberg's Solbjerg Park Cemetery.
