= Giuseppe Siboni =

Italian opera singer (1780–1839)

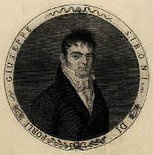
Giuseppe Siboni

Giuseppe Siboni (27 January 1780 – 28 March 1839) was an Italian operatic tenor, opera director, choir conductor, and voice teacher. He began his career in his native country in 1797 and actively performed in major Italian opera houses up through 1818. From 1806 to 1809, he performed successfully in London, and from 1810 to 1814, he was active in Vienna, where he enjoyed the friendship of Ludwig van Beethoven. He played a critical role in Danish musical life from 1819 until his death in 1839. In 1819, he joined the Royal Danish Theatre in Copenhagen, where he worked first as a singer and later as director of the opera chorus and head director. In 1827 he founded the Royal Conservatory of Music in Copenhagen. He was married three times during his life, including his second marriage to the sister of poet Franz von Schober. His third marriage produced a son, the composer and pianist Erik Siboni (1828–1892).

== Life and career ==
Born in Forlì, Siboni studied singing in his native city with castrato Sebastiano Folicaldi. He made his professional opera debut in 1797 at the age of 17 in Florence. Over the next several years he sang with various Italian opera troupes, making appearances in Genoa, Milan, and Prague among other cities. In Prague he married Louise Veith, the daughter of a local banker. He made his debut at La Scala on 26 December 1805 as Abenamet in the world premiere of Giuseppe Nicolini's Abenamet e Zoraide. He returned there the following year to sing the role of Marco Orazio in Domenico Cimarosa's Gli Orazi e i Curiazi.

From 1806 to 1809, Siboni sang in three seasons at the King's Theatre in London. His first critical success there was as Ruggero in Ferdinando Paër's Il principe di Taranto on 23 December 1806. In the 1809–10 season he was once again at La Scala, where he had a particular triumph as the title hero in the world premiere of Simon Mayr's Raoul di Crequi on 26 December 1809. From 1810 to 1814 he was active in Vienna, where he notably performed in the world premiere of Ludwig van Beethoven's Tremate, empi tremate on 27 February 1814. He was much admired at the Vienna Hofoper as Licinio in Gaspare Spontini's La vestale and in several operas by Paer. In 1813 he performed as a guest artist in Prague.

Siboni returned to Italy in late 1814, and on 17 January 1815 he performed the role of Timagene in the house premiere of Gaetano Andreozzi's Il trionfo di Alessandro Magno il Macedone at the Teatro Argentina in Rome. Later that month, he appeared at the Teatro di San Carlo in Naples as Polinesso in Simon Mayr's Ginevra di Scozia. He was heard in several more roles in Naples in 1815–16 and 1818, including Seleuco in Sebastiano Nasolini's La vendetta di Nino and Andreozzi's Timagene. From 1815 to 1817 he performed frequently at the Teatro Comunale di Bologna. While there he created the role of Classamoro in the world premiere of Pietro Generali's Clato on 26 December 1816 and portrayed the role of Argirio in the house premiere of Gioachino Rossini's Tancredi on 29 January 1817.

In 1818 Siboni made appearances at the Mariinsky Theatre in St. Petersburg. He joined the roster of singers at the Royal Danish Theatre (RDT) in Copenhagen in 1819. Christian VIII of Denmark had heard him perform in 1815 and had been trying to recruit him for that theatre ever since. The king later honored Siboni with the title Kongelig Kammersanger. Siboni eventually was appointed director of the RDT and remained active with the opera in Copenhagen until his death in 1839. In 1825 he founded the Royal Conservatory of Music in Copenhagen. Some of his notable pupils were Emilie da Fonseca, Ida Henriette da Fonseca, Johanne Luise Heiberg and Peter Nicolaj Schram. Notable descendants include pianist Anna Siboni and actress Emily Whitworth.
