= Johanne Krarup-Hansen =

Danish operatic mezzo-soprano (1870-1958)

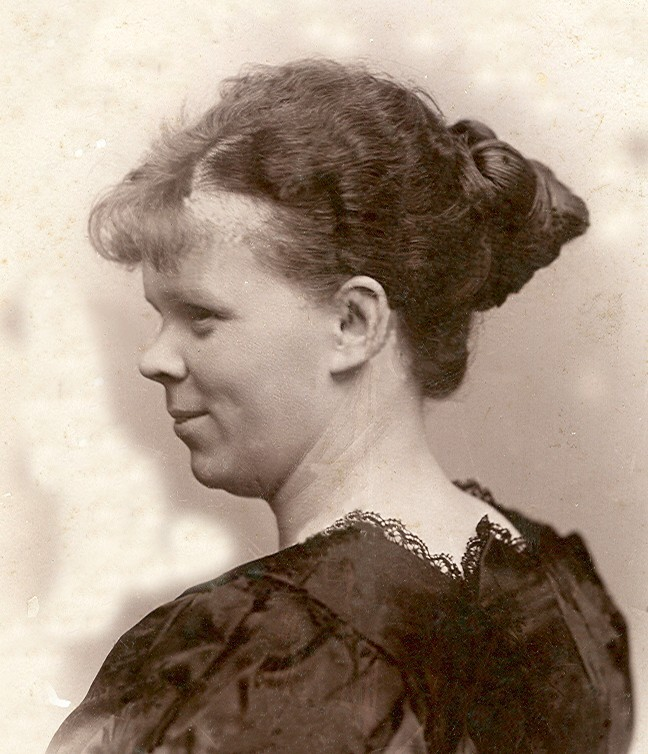
- Born: Johanne Marie Magdalene Krarup-Hansen; 15 June 1870; Vejle, Denmark
- Died: 5 March 1958 (aged 87); Ribe, Denmark
- Occupation: Actress
- Years active: 1889 — 1919
- Parent(s): Hans Christian Mathias Krarup-Hansen, Christine Marie Jørgensen

Johanne Marie Magdalene Krarup-Hansen (1870–1958) was a Danish operatic mezzo-soprano. When 29, she made her début at the Royal Danish Theatre as Orpheus in Gluck's Orpheus and Euridice to wide acclaim. She is remembered in particular for being the first Danish Brünnhilde in Wagner's Die Walküre in 1902. She was honoured by King Frederik VIII in 1908 with the title Royal Chamber Singer.

== Biography ==
Born on 15 June 1870 in Vejle, Johanne Marie Magdalene Krarup-Hansen was the daughter of the schoolteacher Hans Christian Mathias Krarup-Hansen (1836–1907) and his partner Christine Marie Jørgensen (1937–1916). She grew up in a musical home with her two sisters before moving to Copenhagen where she became a pupil of Agnes Adler for piano and of Leopold Rosenfeld for voice. She later studied voice under Hermann Kutzschbach in Dresden.

It was not until March 1899 when aged 29 she made her début at the Royal Danish Theatre as Orpheus, impressing her audience with her deep, full-bodied mezzo delivery. Under Johan Svendsen and later Georg Hoeberg she developed proficiency in performing Wagnerian roles such as Ortrud in Lohengrin and Kundry in Parsifal. She is particularly remembered as Brünnhilde in Die Walküre in 1902, becoming the first Dane to take the role which had previously been performed by the Swede Ellen Gulbranson. She was also admired for her Verdi roles Amneris and Azucena, as well as for the title role in Carmen and Delila in Samson and Delilah. In 1919, after performing Ortrud for the last time, she retired from the stage, devoting the remainder of her career to teaching.

Johanne Krarup-Hansen died in Ribe on 5 March 1958 and is buried in Odense.

== Awards ==
In 1908, she was elevated to the rank of Royal Chamber Singer by King Frederik VIII. In recognition of her services, in 1934 she received the special award for women, Tagea Brandt Rejselegat.
