= Tenna Kraft =

Danish opera singer (1885–1954)

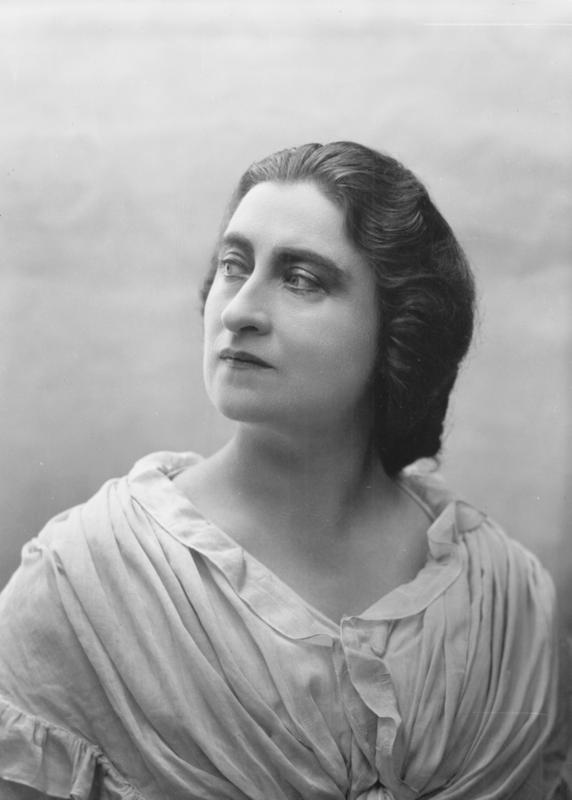
- Tenna Kraft in 1921
- Born: Hortensia Kristine Sofie Erogine Frederiksen; 16 May 1885; Copenhagen, Denmark
- Died: 16 March 1954 (aged 68); Copenhagen, Denmark
- Occupation: Actress
- Years active: 1906 — 1939
- Spouse: Frederik Wilhelm Kraft (m. 1927)
- Parent(s): Christian Frederiksen, Sophie Greisen

Hortensia (Tenna) Kristine Sofie Erogine Kraft née Frederiksen (1885–1954) was a Danish operatic soprano. One of the Royal Danish Theatre's outstanding sopranos in the early 20th century, she sang in operas by Wagner, Verdi, Puccini and Richard Strauss. She gained particular success in 1926 with the title role in Siegfried Salomon's Danish opera Leonora Christina which included the popular Der er tre hjørnestene.

== Biography ==
Born on 16 May 1885 in Copenhagen, Hortensia Kristine Sofie Erogine Frederiksen was the daughter of the house painter Christian Frederiksen (1859–1911) and Sophie Frederikke née Greisen (1859–1908). In 1927, she married the director of the Danish Petroleum Company Frederik Wilhelm Kraft (1879–1962). A talented singer as a child, she first studied in Copenhagen under Jens Larsen Nyrop and Osta Schottlænder before becoming a pupil of Désirée Artôt and Jean de Reszke in Paris.

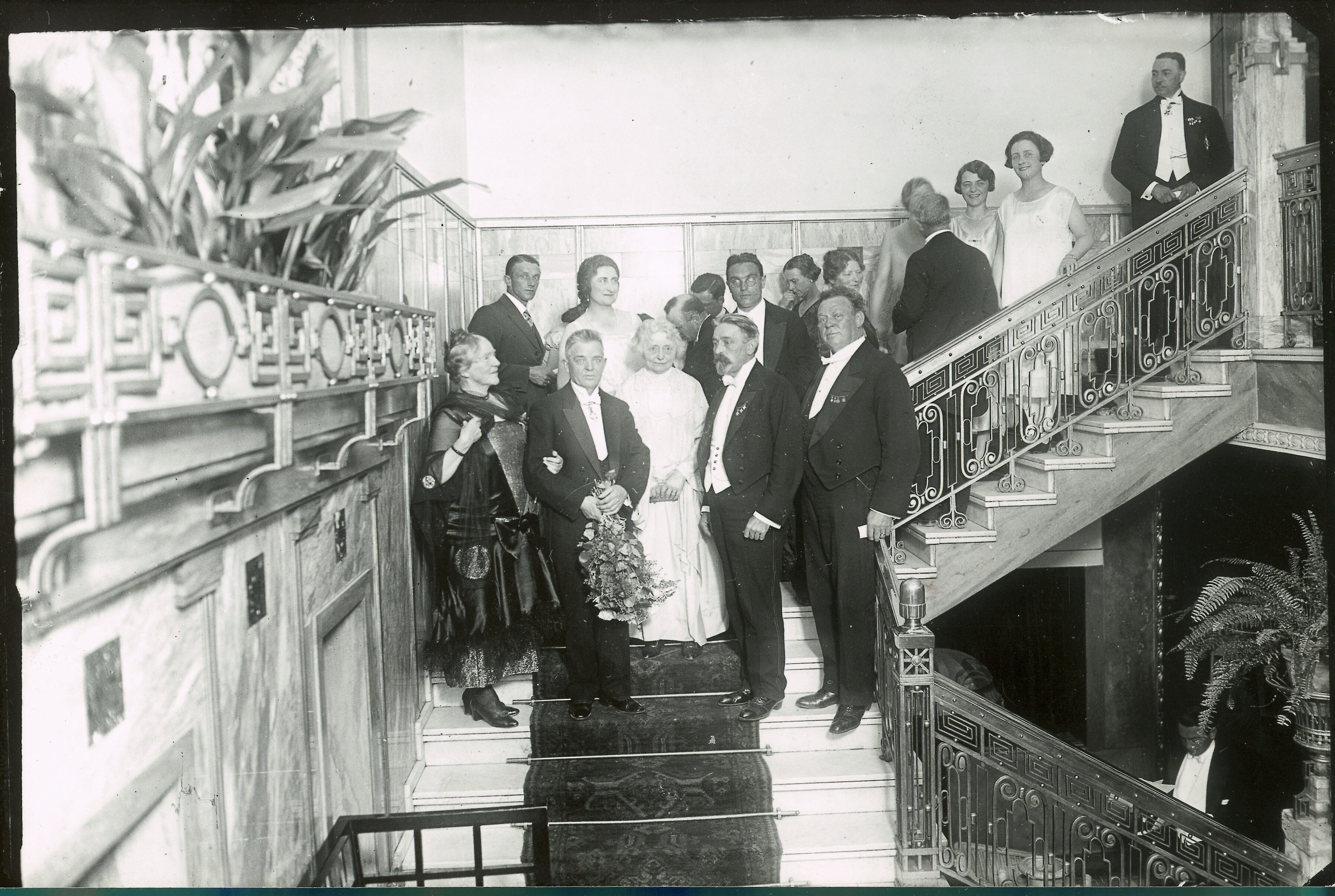
Kraft photographed with Carl Nielsen, Anne Marie Carl-Nielsen, Nina Grieg, Frederik Schnedler-Petersen, Emil Telmanyi and Peter Cornelius in June 1925.

Tenna Frederiksen made her début at the Royal Danish Theatre on 4 April 1906 taking the role of Elsa in Lohengrin. Thanks to her fine golden timbre and lyrical warmth, she became firmly established from the start, performing in a wide range of classical operas. Over the next 33 years, she played most of the well-known leading roles, including those in Tosca and La traviata, Tatyana in Eugene Onegin, Desdemona in Otello and Elisabeth in Tannhäuser. She was particularly popular in Danish works such as Peter Heise's Drot og marsk and Siegfried Salomon's highly acclaimed Leonora Christina which was specially written for her. On her retirement from the stage in 1939, she was celebrated at a reception in the Hotel d'Angleterre with 200 guests in the presence of Prime Minister Thorvald Stauning.

Kraft died on 16 March 1954 in Copenhagen and is buried in Vedbæk.

== Awards ==
In 1914, she was honoured by King Christian X as a Kongelig kammersangerinde or Royal Chamber Singer while in 1922 she received the Ingenio et Arti. In 1932, she was awarded the Tagea Brandt Rejselegat, an honour reserved for outstanding women.
