= Niels Jacob Hansen =

Danish opera singer (1880–1969)

Niels Jacob Hansen (March 23, 1880 – September 19, 1969) was a Danish tenor, mostly famous for his roles in opera.

== Career ==
Niels Hansen was born on March 23, 1880 in Kjelstrup Hyllemark near Kirke Stillinge, Zealand. He studied as an artist but turned to singing and trained with Valdemar Lincke in Copenhagen, who discovered that the young singer held great potential. He made arrangements to train at the Royal Danish Academy of Music from 1906 to 1908. He made his debut in Copenhagen as Rodolfo in a 1909 production of La Boheme at the Danish Royal Theatre, starting a career as one its favorite tenors for forty years. He went to Paris and studied with Jean de Reszke in 1911. Lauritz Melchior was Hansen's understudy at the Danish Metropolitan Opera for a little while in 1921.

He was appointed as Kongelig Kammersanger (Royal Chamber Singer), a prestigious title given only to about fifty opera singers since 1700, by the monarch Christian X.

== Family and personal life ==
His parents were typographer Niels Jacob Hansen (ca. 1856-80) and Birthe Kirstine Christensen (born 1853). He also had 4 children, 3 boys and 1 girl.

Hansen died on September 19, 1969 in Copenhagen. He is buried at Assistens Cemetery in Copenhagen.
