= Ida Møller =

Danish operatic soprano (1872–1947)

Ida Christina Møller (1872–1947) was a Danish operatic soprano who performed at the Royal Danish Theatre from 1894 to 1926. She is remembered for her roles in Mozart's operas, especially Susanna (The Marriage of Figaro), Zerlina (Don Giovanni), and Blonde (Die Entführung aus dem Serail).

== Biography ==
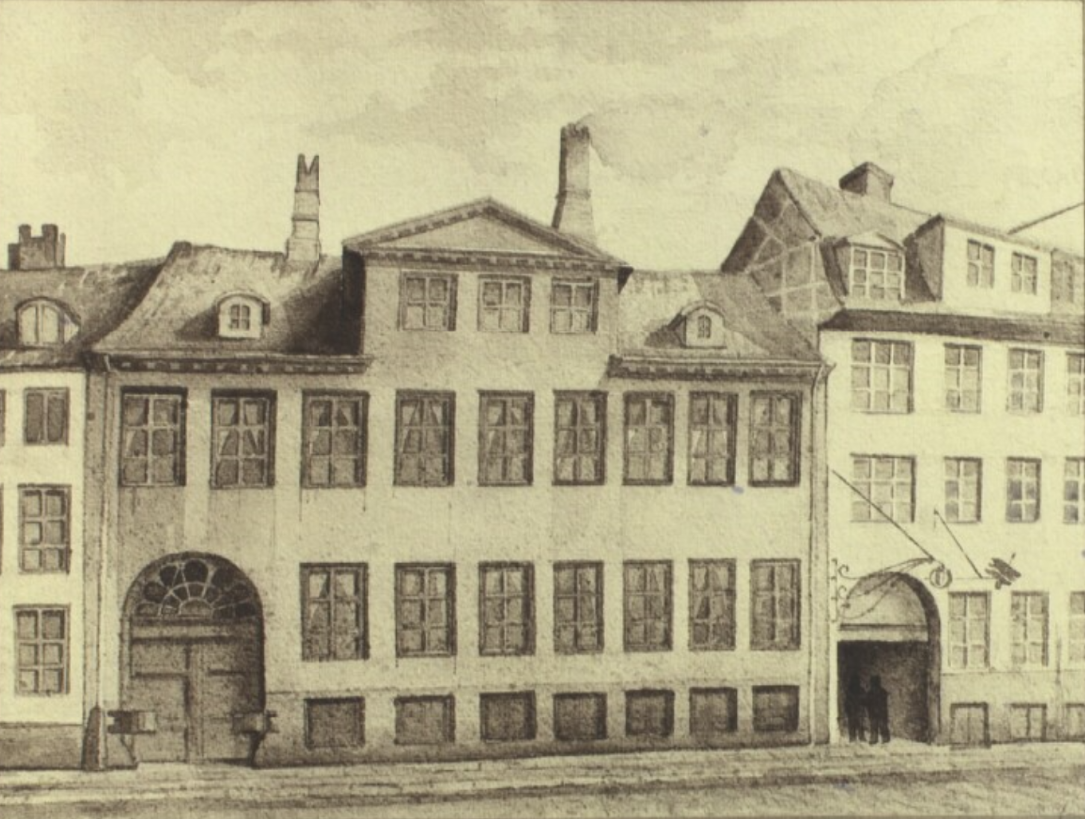
Ida Møller's childhood home at Ny Toldbodgade 15 in Copenhagen

Born in Hull, England, Ida Møller was the daughter of the DFDS shipping executive Charles Møller (1843–93) and his English wife Emily Watson (1847–81). Brought up in a musical family, Møller was initially trained in singing by the opera singer Sophie Keller before joining the students of Royal Danish Theatre on the recommendation of the conductor Johan Svendsen, who appreciated her bright soprano voice. Her stage début was as the Queen of the Night in The Magic Flute in 1894. After further study under the tenor Vittore Devilliers (1849-1932) in Paris, she embarked on the roles in Mozart's operas she would continue to perform until her retirement in 1926. Apart from a short period at the Dagmar Theatre, she performed at the Royal Theatre throughout her career. Other notable roles included Siebel and Margarethe in Gounod's Faust, Euridice and Eros in Gluck'sOrfeo ed Euridice, and Venus in Tannhäuser.

After her official retirement, she continued to sing in concerts in addition to her work as a voice teacher. She was given the title Kongelig Kammersanger (Royal Chamber Singer) by King Frederik VIII in 1907. In 1926, she was awarded the Ingenio et Arti medal. Møller made a number of recordings from 1904 to 1909, including a duet from The Magic Flute with Helge Nissen.

Ida Møller died in the Copenhagen district of Frederiksberg on 10 August 1947 and is buried in Holmens Cemetery.
