= Anna Henriette Levinsohn =

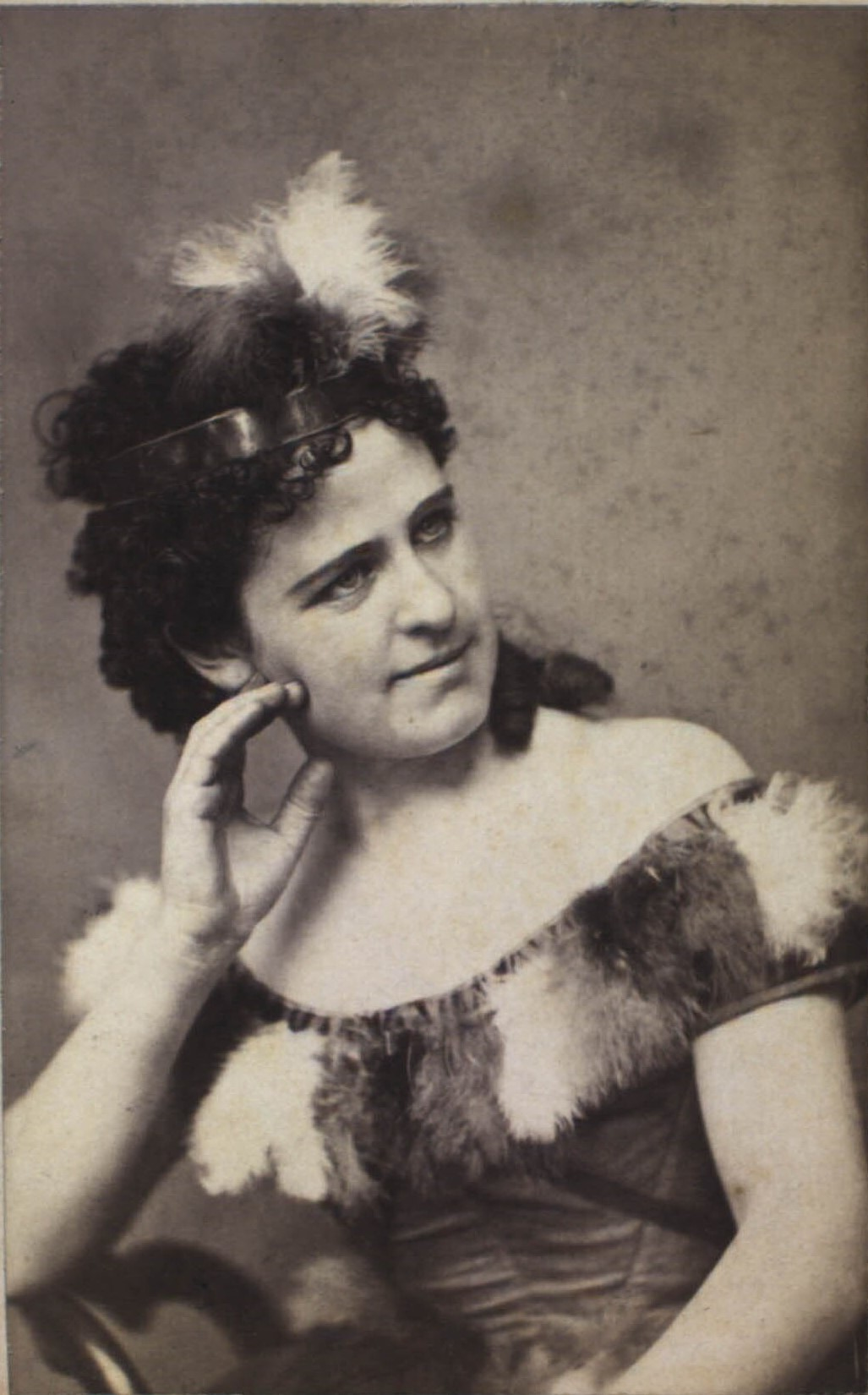
- Levinsohn as Papagena in The Magic Flute
- Born: Anna Henriette Andersen; January 8, 1839; Copenhagen, Denmark
- Died: March 22, 1899 (aged 60); Copenhagen, Denmark
- Honours: Kongelige kammersangere (1879)

Anna Henriette Levinsohn (née Andersen; 8 January 1839 – 22 March 1899) was a Danish operatic soprano and mezzo-soprano. She was known for her vocal range as a mezzo-soprano and unique timbre.

Levinsohn made her debut at the Royal Danish Theatre in 1860, where she performed until her retirement in 1879. Upon her retirement she was awarded the title Kongelige kammersangere.

== Career ==
She began her performance career as a member of the choir of the Royal Danish Theatre in 1857 while studying with Carl Helsted. Her name was first credited in a programme for an 1858 production of Adam Oehlenschläger's historic tragedy Hakon Jarl hin Rige as Inger. After playing smaller roles with the company, she made her formal debut at the theatre on 20 December 1860 as Nannette in a production of François-Adrien Boieldieu's Le petit chaperon de rouge. In 1866 she was promoted, becoming a royal actress within the theatre.

In the summer of 1867, she travelled to Paris to study briefly with Victor Massé. He advised her to stay in France and expand her career there, though she ultimately remained in Denmark. Over the course of her career at the Royal Danish Theatre she performed as Rosina in The Barber of Seville, Susanna in The Marriage of Figaro, Papagena in The Magic Flute, Anna in Der Freischütz, Benjamin in Joseph and his Brethren, Siebel in Faust, Zerlina in Don Giovanni, Venus in Tannhäuser, and the Queen in Hans Heiling.

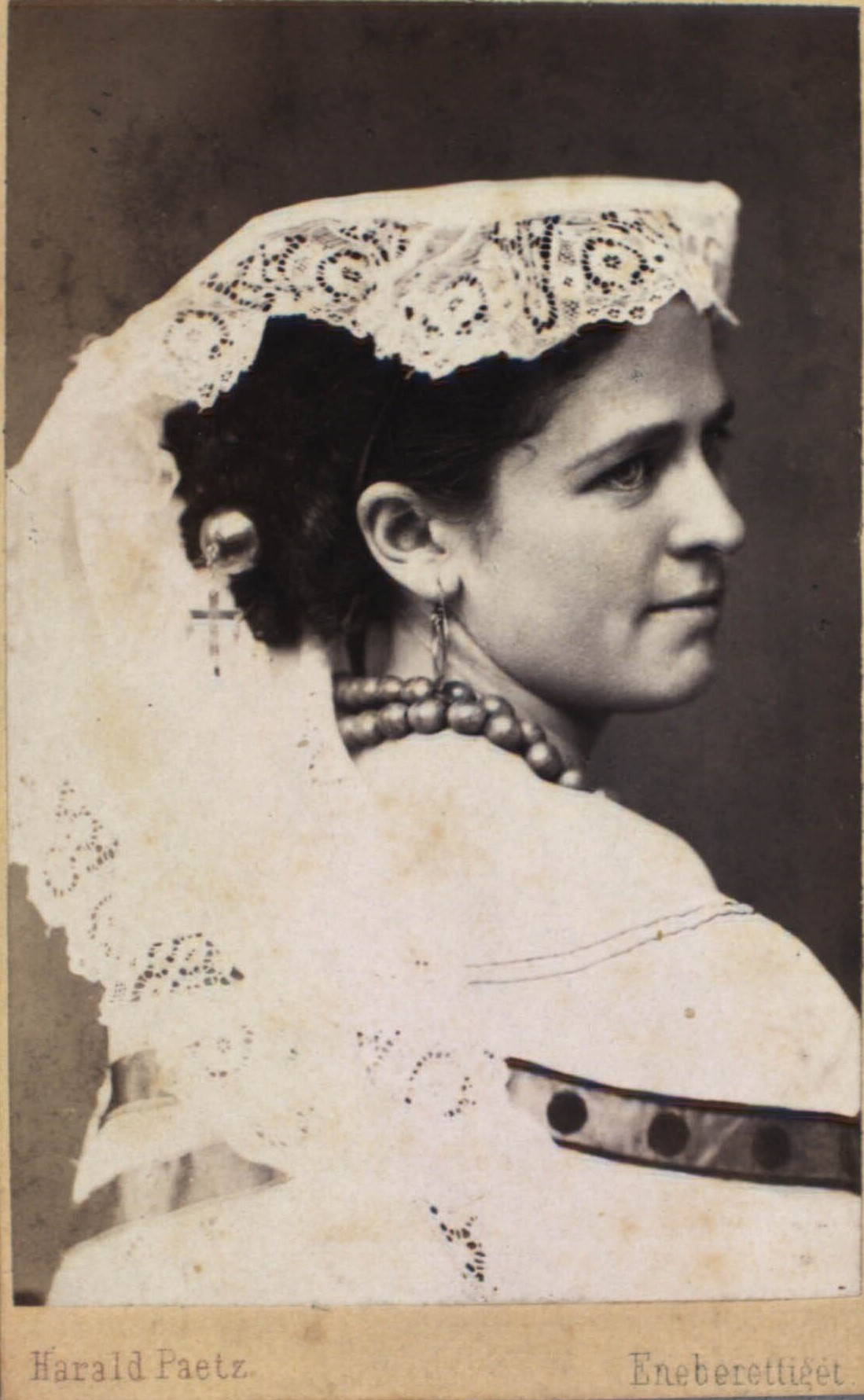

Although primarily known as an opera singer, Levinsohn also performed in early vaudeville productions, including Christoph Ernst Friedrich Weyse's musical comedy Et Eventyr i Rosenborg Have and Johan Ludvig Heiberg's Recensenten og Dyret. These early vaudeville productions are credited with having popularized the genre in Denmark.

Chronic illness caused Levinsohn to frequently take periods of absence from performing. Eventually, her health forced her to retire in 1879, having made her final performance as Marie in La fille du régiment on 6 June. She was honored as a Kongelige kammersangere that year.

== Personal life ==
Anna Heriette Andersen was born on 8 January 1838 in Copenhagen. She came from a family of musicians, as her father played the oboe the Royal Life Guards Music Band and her two brothers were bassoonists in the Royal Danish Orchestra.

In 1871, she married a doctor, taking his surname: Levinsohn. She died in Copenhagen on 22 March 1899.
