= Dorothy Larsen =

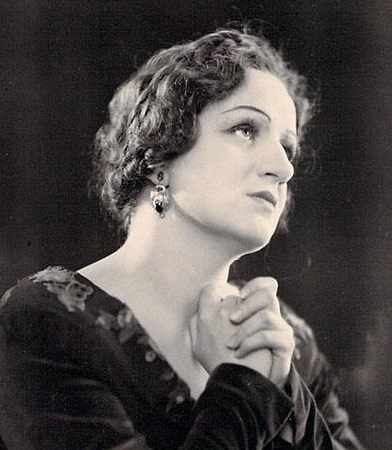
- Larsen performing in Tiefland
- Born: 19 November 1911; Chicago, Illinois, United States
- Died: 31 October 1990 (aged 78); Gentofte, Denmark
- Occupations: Actress, opera singer
- Years active: 1937 — 1949
- Spouse: Johannes Fønss
- Parent(s): Johannes Møller Larsen, Jenny Annette Kirstine Klitgaard

Dorothy Jane Larsen (1911–1990) was an American-born Danish operatic soprano. She made her début in Copenhagen's Royal Danish Theatre as Fricka in Die Walküre in 1937 and remained with the company until 1960. Appearing in a wide variety of roles, she went on to develop her Wagnerian talents as Elisabeth in Tannhäuser and Elsa in Lohengrin but was also particularly admired as Tosca. In 1949, she was honoured by King Frederik IX as a Royal Chamber Singer. She performed as a guest in Dresden and Vienna.

== Biography ==
Born on 19 November 1911 in Chicago, Dorothy Jane Larsen was the daughter of the ice cream specialist Johannes (John) Møller Larsen and his wife Jenny Annette Kirstine née Klitgaard. As a child, she first intended to become a dancer and took lessons at the Vestoff-Serrova School of Dance but soon discovered she had a mature singing voice. When she arrived with her parents in Dresden, she opted for singing and in Copenhagen she attended the Royal Theatre's opera school. She later studied under her husband-to-be, the opera singer Johannes Fønss. They married in October 1940.

She made her début at the Royal Danish Theatre in 1937 as Fricka in Die Walküre. Her voice and acting abilities improved from year to year. She received considerable acclaim as Giulietta in The Tales of Hoffmann. Other major roles in the early 1940s included Margarethe in Faust, Elisabeth in Tannhäuser, Elsa in Lohengrin and Eva in Die Meistersinger von Nürnberg. She also appeared as Tosca, Desdemona in Otello and Santuzza in Cavalleria rusticana. Larsen performed as a guest in Berlin, Vienna, Dresden and Gothenburg. In 1949, she was honoured with the title Royal Chamber Singer.

Dorothy Larsen died in the Frederiksberg district of Copenhagen on 31 October 1990.
