= Emilie Ulrich =

Danish soprano (1872-1952)

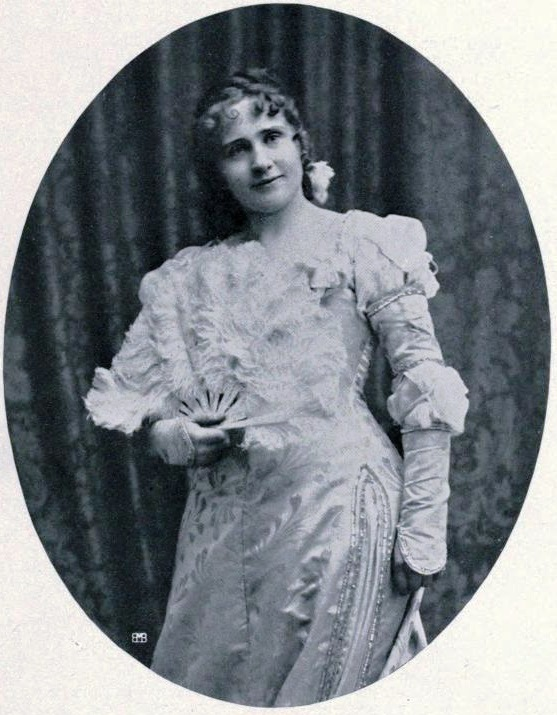
- Ulrich, c. 1900
- Born: Emilie Boserup; November 26, 1872; Frerslev, Denmark
- Died: January 31, 1952 (aged 79); Copenhagen, Denmark

Emilie Ulrich (née Boserup) (26 November 1872 – 31 January 1952) was a Danish soprano who sang leading roles at the Royal Danish Theatre from 1894 until her retirement from the stage in 1917. Ulrich was appointed a Kongelige kammersangere in 1906 and received the Ingenio et Arti medal in 1917.

== Career ==
Ulrich began taking lessons from Sophie Keller at the age of 14 and later was also taught by Hermann Goetz in Leipzig.

She made her stage debut on 9 May 1894 as Margherita in Mefistofele at the Royal Danish Theatre. While employed at the theatre, she received dramatic training from Emil Poulsen and Peter Jerndorff. While the theatre was under the direction of Johan Svendsen, she received major roles from across the classical repertoire. Among her notable roles were: Michal in Saul og David (1902), Leonora in Maskarade (1906), and Mimi in La bohème.

Outside of her work with the Theatre, she also performed as a romance singer. In particular, she performed with the Cæciliaforening, an organization dedicated to cultivating church music, the Danish branch of which had been founded by Henrik Rung in 1851. Ulrich also made a number of recordings in 1907 and 1908, including several with Vilhelm Herold.

Ulrich retired in 1917, after making her last performance as Mimi in La bohème on 21 May. Upon her retirement she was awarded the Ingenio et Arti medal in recognition of her singing abilities. After her retirement she taught singing privately.

== Personal life ==
Emilie Boserup was born on 26 November 1872 in Frerselv, a small town near Haslev, to Otto Christian Haaber Boserup (1841–1923) and Anna Thomine Faaborg (1848–1930). Her maternal grandparents both performed at the Royal Danish Theatre. Her grandfather, Rasmus Christian Faaborg, was a tenor; her grandmother, Emilie Levin, was an alto.

On 21 July 1899 she married lieutenant colonel Kay Ulrich (1866–1926) in Hellested. They had two children: Aase and Birthe. Their daughter Aase became a stage and film actress and was married to athlete Ejner Augsburg. Birthe married Franz Eichstedt Bülow, a lawyer of the supreme court.

Emilie Ulrich died in Copenhagen at the age of 79.
