= Sophie Keller =

Danish operatic soprano (1850–1929)

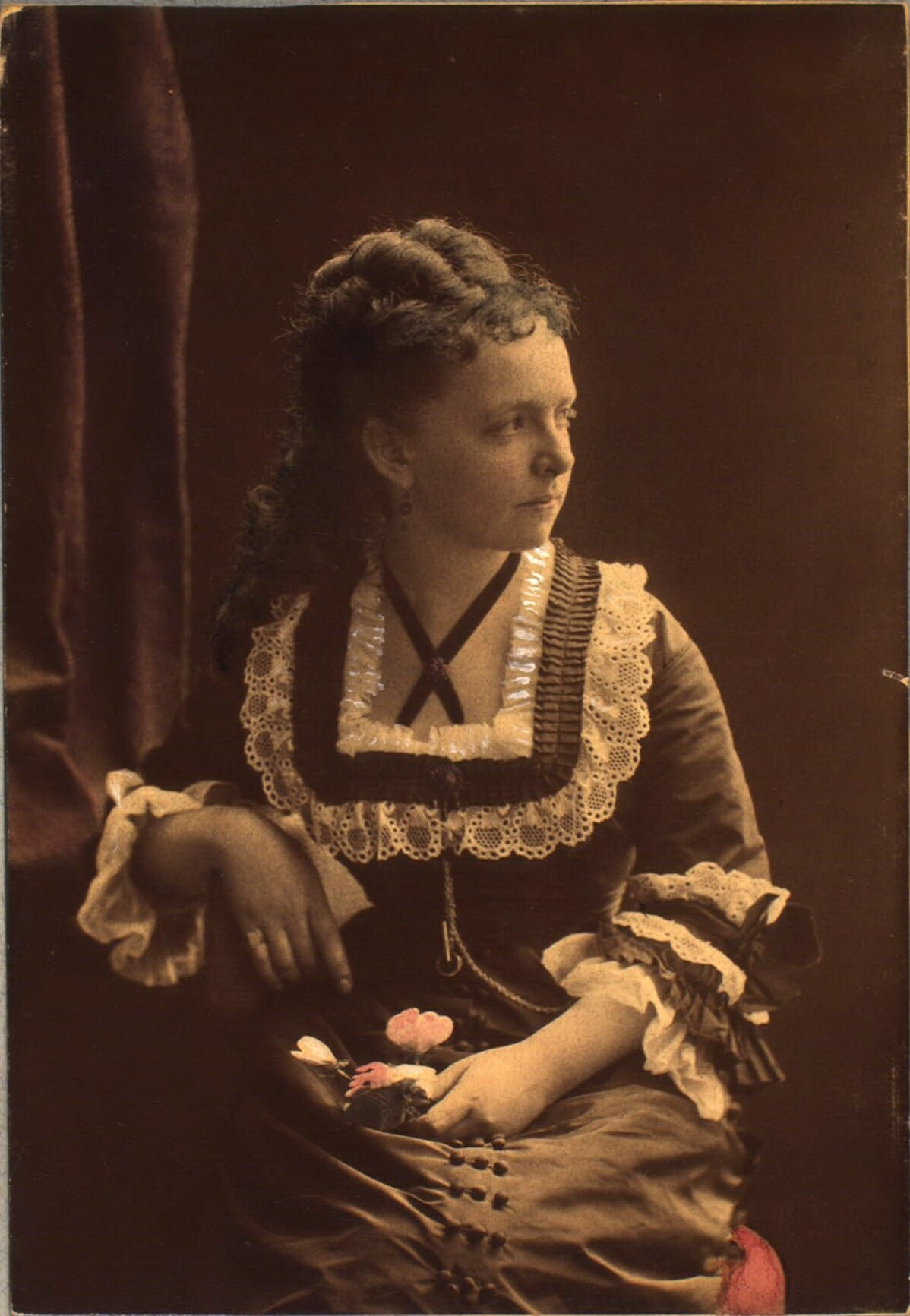
Sophie Keller

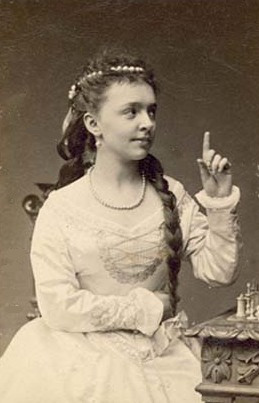
Sophie Keller

Sophie Helene Henriette Keller née Rung (1850–1929) was a Danish operatic soprano, musician and singing teacher, who performed at the Royal Danish Theatre in Copenhagen from 1869. She founded both a conservatory for women and a women's concert association.

== Biography ==
Born in Copenhagen on 14 November 1850, Sophie Rung was the daughter of the composer Henrik Rung (1807–71) and the opera singer Frederikke Charlotte Pauline Lichtenstein (1818–90), generally known as Pauline Rung. Raised in a musical family, she learnt to play the guitar, piano and organ. When she was 13, her father, who was singing master at the Royal Theatre, gave her singing lessons. He later sent her to Italy where she was taught by Francesco Lamperti in Milan and Pietro Romani in Florence. In 1877, she married the lawyer Emil Charles Thorvald Keller. Their son, P. S. Rung-Keller (1879–1966), was a composer.

After appearing in her father's concerts at the Cæcilia Society, she made her début at the Royal Theatre when she was 19 as Agathe in Carl Maria von Weber's Der Freischütz. She was complemented on following in her mother's footsteps and on her well-trained vocal competence. While her singing was highly appreciated, she was less proficient as an actress, although she improved with experience. Known primarily as a mezzo-soprano, she also sang a number of soprano parts in Mozart's operas, such as Donna Anna, Donna Elvia and Almaviva, as well as Leonora in Il trovatore and Beethoven's Fidelio. She also performed in several Wagnerian operas.

In 1888, together with Fanny Gætje, she founded Kjøbenhavns Sang- og Musikkonservatorium for Damer (Copenhagen's Song and Music Conservatory for Ladies). In connection with her jubilee in 1894, she was given the status of Kongelig Kammersanger (Royal Chamber Singer). On retiring from the Royal Theatre in 1895, she founded the Privat kvindelig Koncertforening (Private Women's Concert Society) which ran to 130 members for the orchestra and choir. She is also remembered as a teacher, with students including Elisabeth Dons, Emilie Ulrich, Ida Møller, Fanny Gætje and Ingeborg Steffensen.

Sophie Keller died in Copenhagen on 1 May 1929. She is buried in Copenhagen's Assistens Cemetery.
