= Margrethe Lendrop =

Danish operatic soprano

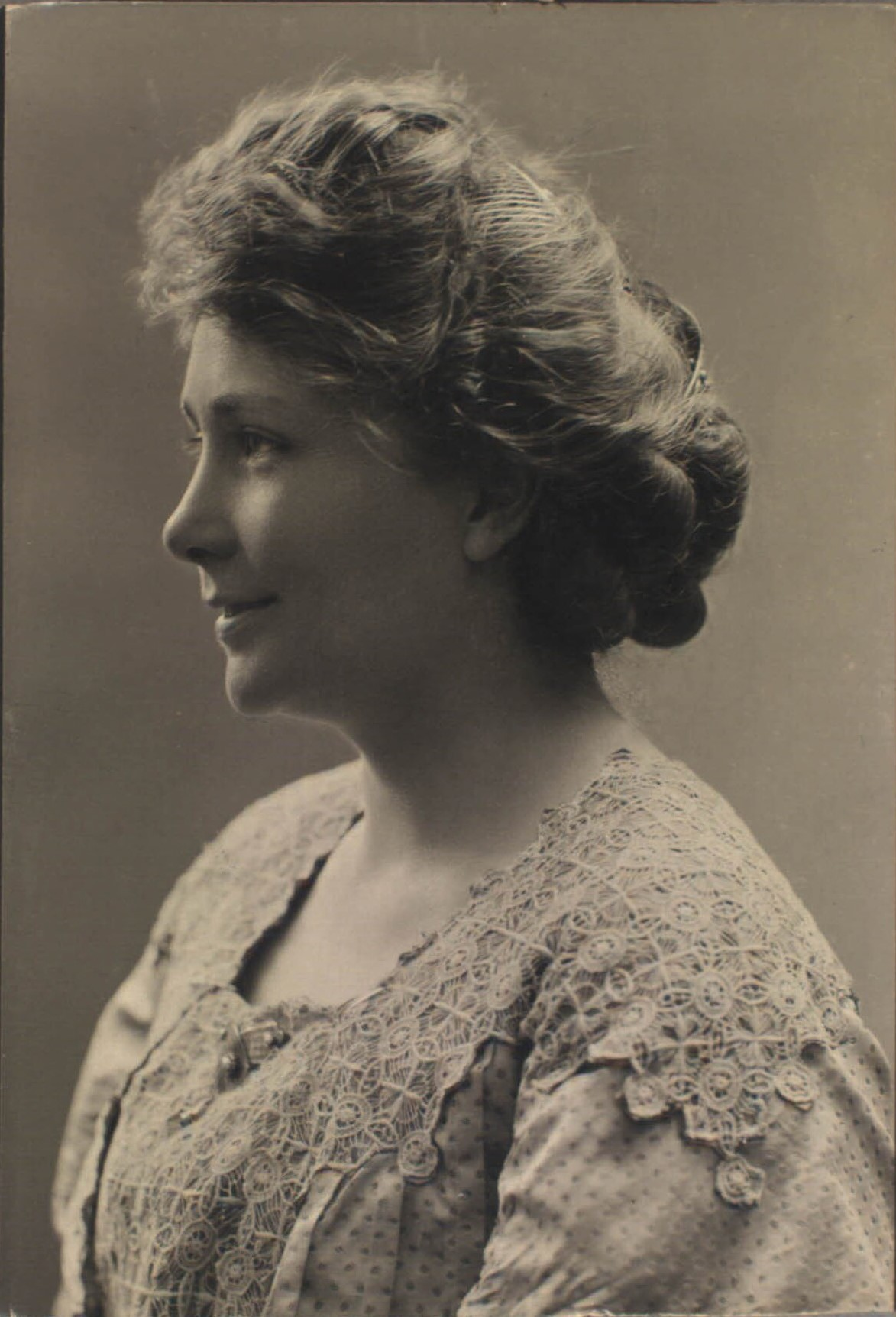
Margrethe Lendrop

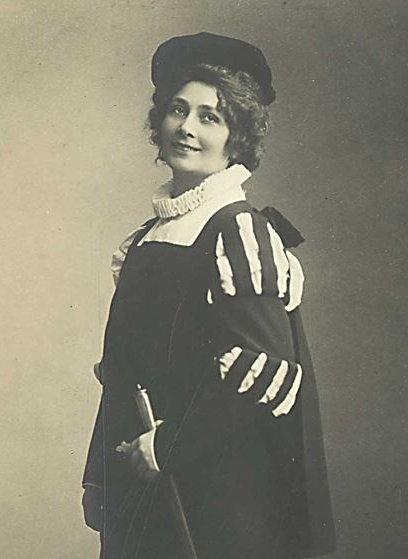
Margrethe Lendrop in Faust

Anna Margrethe Lendrop née Boeck (1873–1920) was a Danish operatic soprano who performed at the Royal Danish Theatre from 1898 to 1919. She is remembered above all for her title role in Carmen which she performed a total of 131 times.

== Biography ==
Born on 13 July 1873 in Kalundborg in the north west of Zealand, Margrethe Boeck was the daughter of the merchant Carl Julius Boeck (1838–1928) and Thora Rasmine Mathiassen (1848–93). She was brought up in a prosperous provincial home, developing an early interest in the theatre thanks to her mother's interest in drama. She was trained by the Swedish opera singer Algot Lange (1850–1904) who considered her voice too weak and inflexible for the stage. Recordings clearly show, nevertheless, that she had quite a powerful delivery and could comfortably reach the high notes.

Her début at the Royal Theatre in 1898 was as Carmen was acclaimed not only for her delicate interpretation of the music but also for her accomplished stage performance. Her figure and sense of drama appear to have been even more suited to roles such as Siebel in Faust, Cherubino in The Marriage of Figaro and Octavian in Der Rosenkavalier. In 1915, she was elevated to the rank of Kongelig Kammersanger (Royal Chamber Singer) by King Christian X. Margrethe Lendrop retired while still young in 1919, hoping to devote more time to concert performances but she died suddenly in 1920. She left two children, Agnete and Gudrun Sophie, following her marriage in 1902 with the medical doctor Otto Lendrop (1863–1930).

== Discography ==
A considerable number of recordings of Margrethe Lendrop were made between 1906 and 1915. They include arias from Mignon, Cavalleria Rusticana, Carmen, Il Trovatore, La Bohème, Faust and The Marriage of Figaro.
