= Assistens Cemetery =

Name of several cemeteries in Denmark

An Assistens Cemetery (Danish: assistenskirkegård) is a cemetery that functions as an expansion of another, older cemetery often associated with a city church.

By the end of the 17th century, Danish authorities considered the conditions for inner-city cemeteries increasingly unacceptable. Space was becoming limited, and it was also deemed unhygienic to conduct burials in the inner-city. The solution was to erect shared cemeteries in the outskirts of a town, named Assisting Cemetery, primarily in larger towns. The first of these in Nørrebro, Copenhagen, was founded by royal resolution on May 26, 1757, and inaugurated November 6, 1760.

Many of the cemeteries originally founded on the outskirts of a town now find themselves once again surrounded by the town due to urban growth.

Assistens Kirkegård has become the name of a number of cemeteries in Denmark:

- Assistens Kirkegård (Birkerød)
- Assistens Kirkegård (Copenhagen, founded 1757, inaugurated 1760)
- Assistens Kirkegård (Fredericia)
- Assistens Kirkegård (Haderslev)
- Assistens Kirkegård (Køge)
- Assistens Kirkegård (Lyngby)
- Assistens Kirkegård (Nyborg)
- Assistens Kirkegård (Odense, inaugurated 1811)
- Assistens Kirkegård (Skagen, inaugurated 1884)
- Assistens Kirkegård (Svendborg)
- Assistens Ny Kirkegård (Nørresundby)
