= Hermann Ludwig Kutzschbach =

German conductor

Hermann Ludwig Kutzschbach (30 August 1875, Meissen – 9 February 1938, Dresden) was a German conductor whose career was principally at Dresden.

The son of a music-master, he studied at the Dresden Conservatory under Adolf Kluge, Eugen Krantz and Felix Draeseke. In 1895 he became répétiteur at the Dresden Court Theatre, and he remained there, though with short absences (notably in 1898 at Cologne and at the New Royal Opera House in Berlin), until 1906. In 1898 he became 3rd conductor at Dresden, with Ernst von Schuch and Bernhard Joachim Hagen. From 1906 to 1909 he went to Mannheim as 1st conductor, and then returned to Dresden as successor to Hagen. In 1913 he became 2nd conductor, and after Schuch's death in 1914 he acted as 1st conductor with Fritz Reiner. Later he co-operated with Fritz Busch there.

== Sources ==
- Arthur Eaglefield Hull, A Dictionary of Modern Music and Musicians (Dent, London 1924).
