= Ruth Guldbæk =

Danish operatic soprano

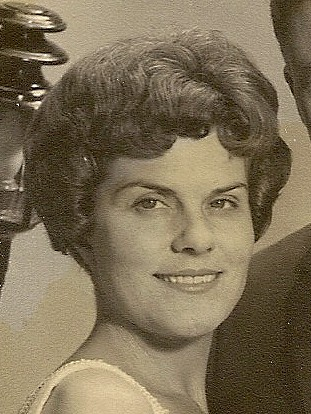
- Born: Elly Ruth Guldbæk Jensen; 1 December 1919; Frederikshavn, Denmark
- Died: 14 August 2006 (aged 86); Copenhagen, Denmark
- Occupation: Opera singer
- Years active: 1947 — 1954
- Parent(s): Christian Peter Jensen, Caroline Marie Arentsen

Elly Ruth Guldbæk Degerbøl née Guldbæk Jensen (1919–2006) was a Danish operatic soprano. After training at Copenhagen's Folketeatret and Det Ny Teater, she joined the Royal Danish Theatre where she made her début in 1947 as Zerline in Don Giovanni. After a long series of successful soubrette and coloratura roles, she performed in Covent Garden on three occasions in the early 1950s. Guldbæk was honoured as a Royal Chamber Singer in 1955. She was equally successful for her concert hall recitals.

== Biography ==
Born in Frederikshavn on 1 December 1919, Elly Ruth Guldbæk Jensen was the daughter of Christian Peter Jensen and Caroline Marie née Arentsen. After training in the singing class at the Folketeater and Den Ny Teater in the early 1940s, she attended the Royal Danish Theatre's opera school from 1944 to 1947.

Gulbæk made her début at the Royal Theatre in 1947 at Zerline in Don Giovanni, embarking on a lengthy career with the company. In 1950, she continued voice studies in Vienna under Edytha Fleischer and in Milan under Maria Labia. In 1950 and 1951, she performed in Covent Garden as Sophie in Der Rosenhavalier and in 1954 as Susanna in The Marriage of Figaro. Other successful coloratura roles in Copenhagen included Ännchen in Der Freischütz, Musetta in La bohème and Fiordiligi in Così fan tutte. She also took on more demanding soprano roles such as Pamina in The Magic Flute, Micaela in Carmen and Antonia in The Tales of Hoffmann. She was also a successful concert performer, frequently singing religious works such as Bach's oratorios.

Ruth Guldbæk died in Copenhagen on 14 August 2006 and is buried in Holmens Cemetery.
