= Niels Juel Simonsen =

Danish baritone opera singer

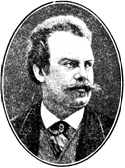
Niels Juel Simonsen.

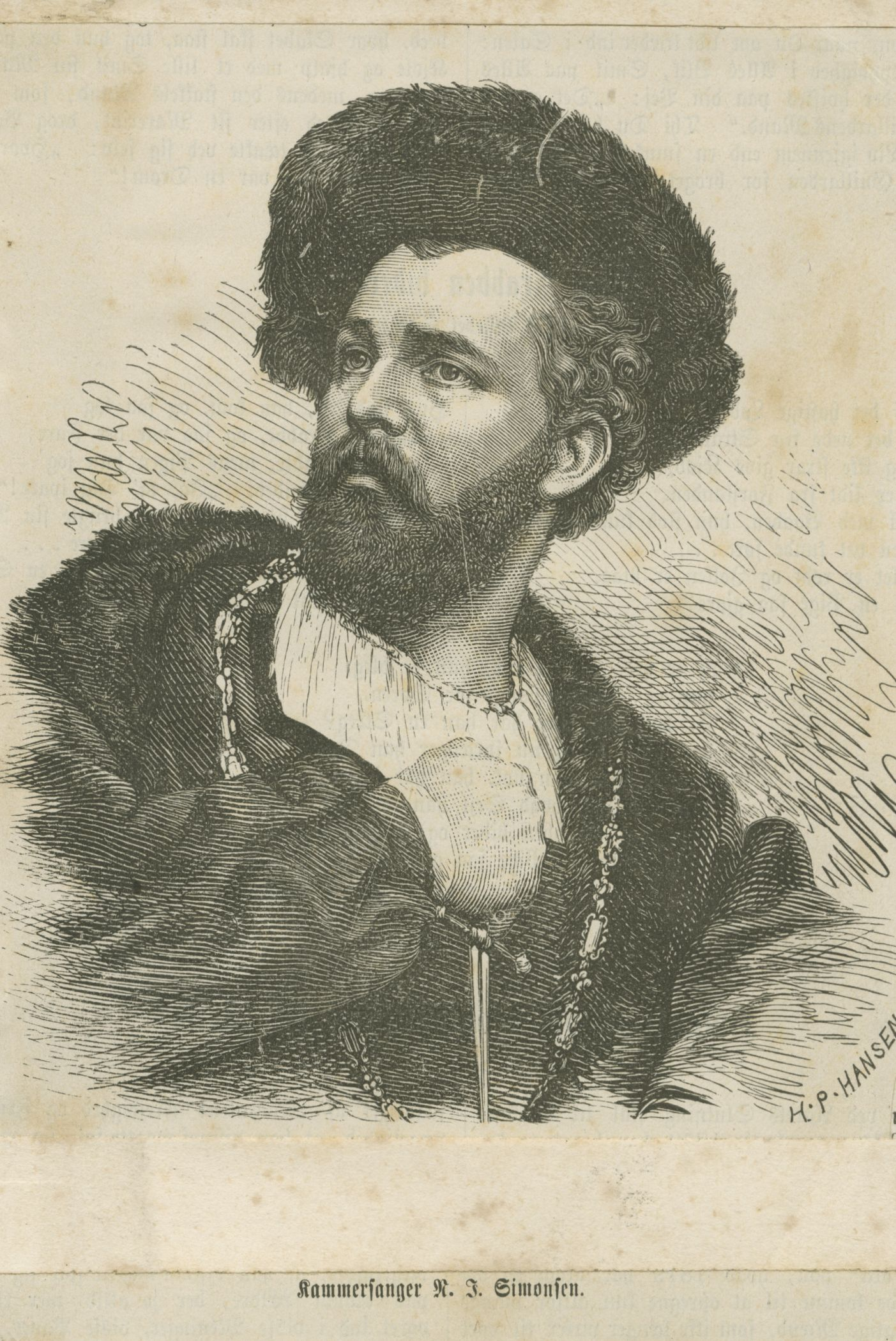
Portrait, collection of the Bergen Public Library.

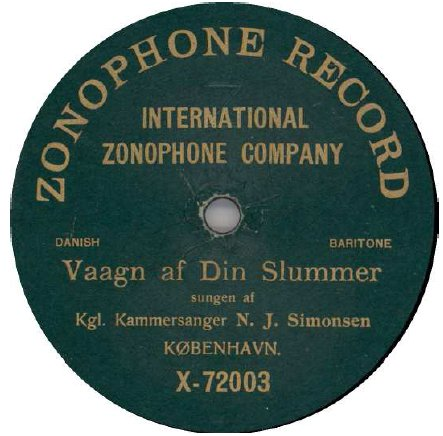
1903 Zonophone recording of Simonsen in Vaagn af din Slummer

Niels Juel Simonsen (16 May 1846 – 25 May 1906) was a Danish baritone opera singer, who made his debut in 1874. He gave many performances of Edvard Grieg's songs, in particular Den Bergtekne. He was born and died in Copenhagen.
