= Drot og marsk =

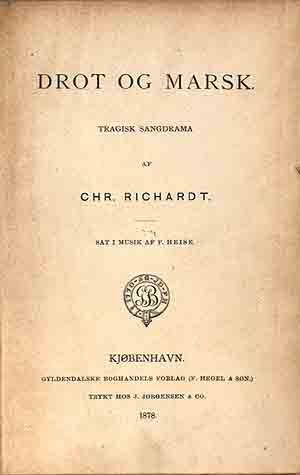
The libretto for Drot ogt Marsk.

Drot og marsk (King and Marshal) is an opera by the Danish composer Peter Heise. The libretto, by Christian Richardt, is based on Carsten Hauch's play Marsk Stig (1850). The opera was first performed at the Royal Theatre, Copenhagen, on 25 September 1878.

== Roles ==
Role	Voice type	Premiere cast
King Erik	tenor	Emil Poulsen
Marshal Stig	baritone	Niels Juel Simonsen
Fru Ingeborg	soprano	
Rane Johnsen	tenor	
Count Jakob	baritone	
Jens Grand	bass	
Arved Bengsten	tenor	
Aase	soprano	Sophie Keller

== Synopsis ==
The opera is based on the true story of the murder of the Danish king Eric Glipping in 1286. The king is an inveterate womaniser and when he seduces Ingeborg, the wife of Marshal Stig, the marshal organises a conspiracy to kill him. Stig is banished and Ingeborg commits suicide.

== Recordings ==
- Drot og marsk, Poul Elming, Bent Norup, Eva Johansson, Aage Haugland, Danish National Radio Choir and Royal Symphony Orchestra, conducted by Michael Schønwaldt (Chandos Records)

== Gallery ==
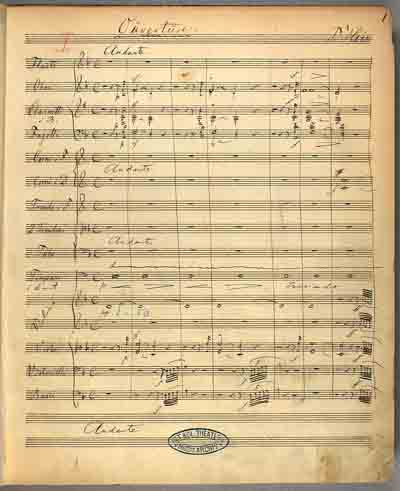
Heise's sheet music

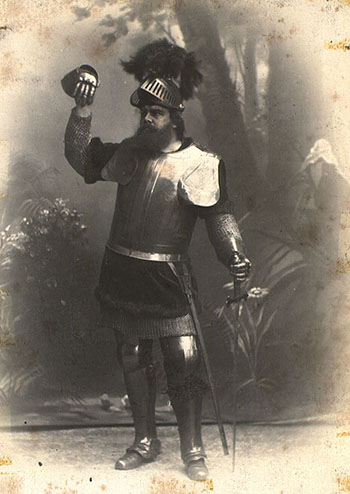
Niels Juel Simonsen as Marsk Stig at the premiere

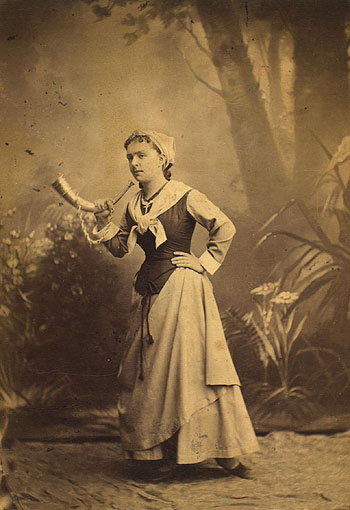
Sophie Keller as Aase at the premier

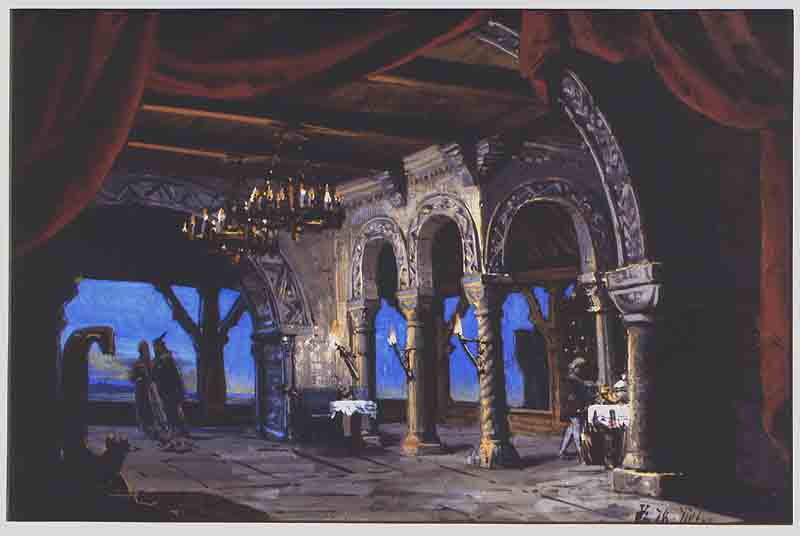
Valemdar Gyllich's sketch for the scenography for the royal castle.e

== Sources ==
- The Viking Opera Guide ed. Holden (Viking, 1993)
- The Penguin Guide to Opera on Compact Discs (1993)
