= Peter Arnold Heise =

Danish composer

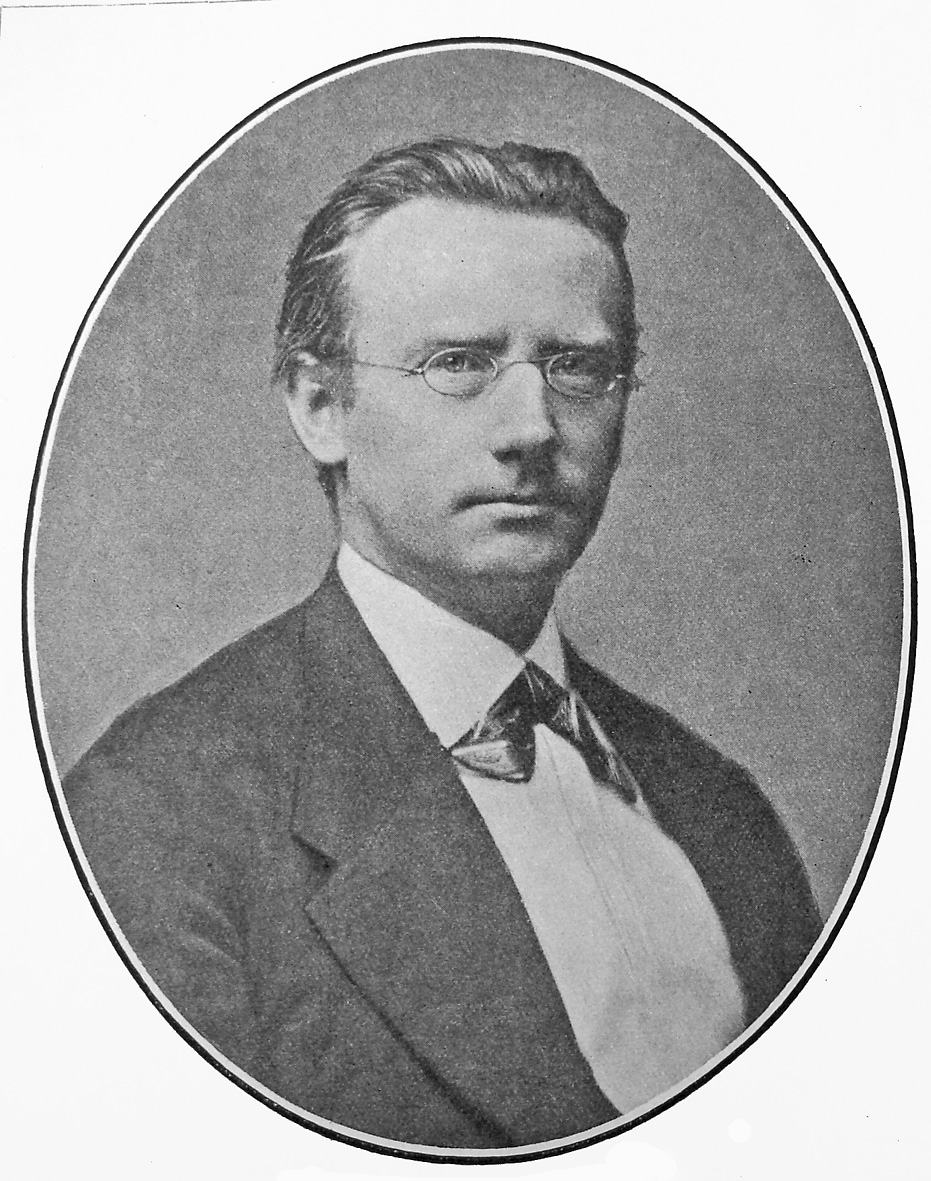
Peter Arnold Heise.

Peter Heise (11 February 1830 – 12 September 1879) was a Danish composer, best known for the opera Drot og Marsk (King and Marshal).

Heise's parents tried to press him into becoming a lawyer, but he scored highly in music at school, so he changed direction. He began writing songs at the age of 19. As a young man he collected several hundred folk songs directly from ordinary people. He used these tunes in Tornerose (Sleeping Beauty) and Bergliot (A Danish historical romance). He studied under Niels Wilhelm Gade, who was a major influence on his style. From 1857 to 1865 he was a teacher and organist at Sorø Academy. He did a setting of Hans Christian Andersen's poem Jylland mellem tvende Have (Jutland between two seas) in 1860.

The opera Drot og Marsk tells the story of the murder of a medieval king, and contains some folk ballads. It shows a Wagnerian influence. His setting of the Shakespeare song When I was and a little tiny boy and Five Erotic songs are also in print. Many of his songs, usually for soprano and piano, concern dreams, folk-tales and the Middle Ages. Although his instrumental works are almost uniformly excellent, because of the tremendous popularity of his songs, they were overlooked. Among his chamber music works are 6 string quartets, a piano trio, a piano quintet, and a number of instrumental sonatas.

His Piano Quintet in F Major, composed in 1869, was widely regarded as a major work. Unfortunately, the work remained in manuscript for 140 years. However, in 2009, the world premiere edition of the parts to the Quintet was published by Edition Silvertrust. They have also reprinted his Cello Sonata (1867) and his Two Fantasy Pieces for Cello and Piano.

== Personal life ==
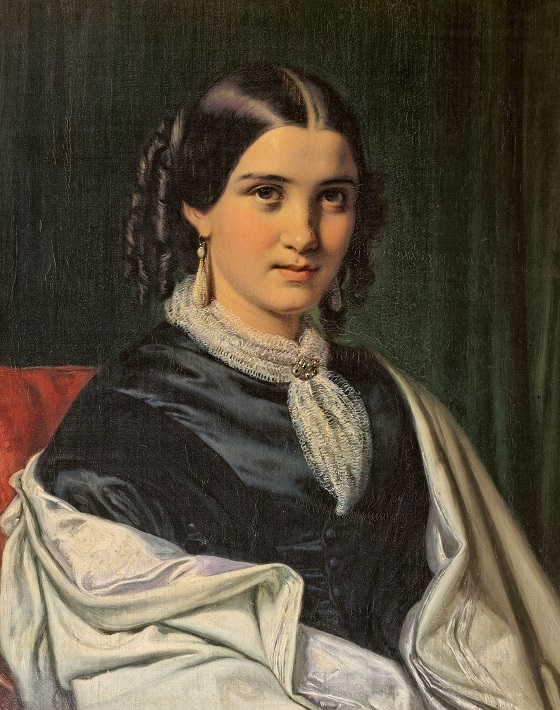
Vilhelmine Heise painted by Wilhelm Marstrand in 1856

He married Vilhelmine Hage (1838–1912), a daughter of the wealthy merchant Alfred Hage. The couple had no children. They moved from Sorø to Copenhagen in 1865. They first lived at Kongens Nytorv 18 (1866–1867) and then at Kongens Nytorv 6 (demolished) from 1868 to 1879.

They visited Italy in 1861–1862, 1867, 1868–1869 and 1879 and Paris in the spring of 1865.
