= Ingenio et arti =

Danish medal awarded to prominent scientists and artists

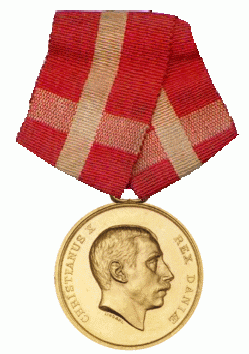
- Obverse of the medal
- Type: Award medal
- Awarded for: Awarded to artists (musicians, painters, actors and scientists) who have done extremely noteworthy work.
- Country: Denmark
- Presented by: Frederik X
- Post-nominals: M.i.&a.
- Status: Currently awarded
- Established: 31 August 1841
- First award: 1 December 1841
- Final award: 2021

Highlights
- Total: 167
- Ribbon bar of the medal

Ingenio et arti (from Latin: For Science and Art) is a Danish medal awarded to prominent Danish and foreign scientists and artists. The honour, a personal award of the Monarch, was instituted by King Christian VIII in 1841, and could be awarded to women as well as men.

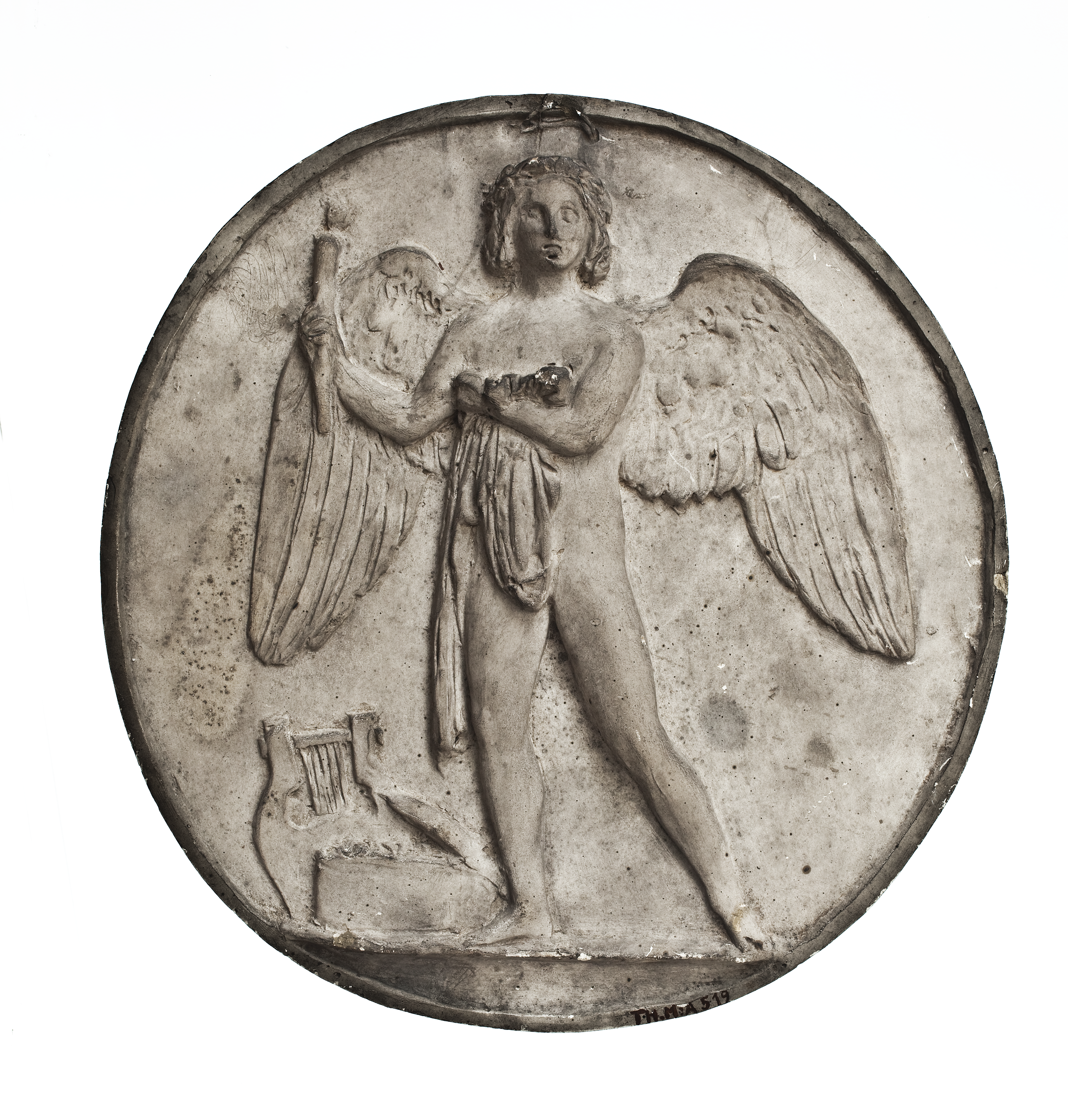
The Genius of Light by Bertel Thorvaldsen

The reverse shows The Genius of Light, engraved after the 1841 plaster relief by Bertel Thorvaldsen.

The medal is awarded irregularly, on average less than twice per year, and was most recently (as of May 2021) awarded to John Neumeier after the première of his ballet Mahler's 3rd Symphony on 19 May 2021 at the Copenhagen Opera House.

== Recipients ==
- Bertha Wegmann, 1892
- Anna Ancher, 1913
- Emilie Ulrich, 1917
- Adeline Genée, 1923
- Gerda Christophersen, 1929
- Karen Blixen, 1952
- Bjørn Nørgaard, 1999
- Kirsten Simone, 2001
- Ghita Nørby, 2006
- Hans Edvard Nørregård-Nielsen, 2013
- Lars Liebst, 2020
- John Neumeier, 2021
