= Frederiksberg Ældre Kirkegård =

Cemetery in Copenhagen

Coordinates: 55°40′24″N 12°32′4″E

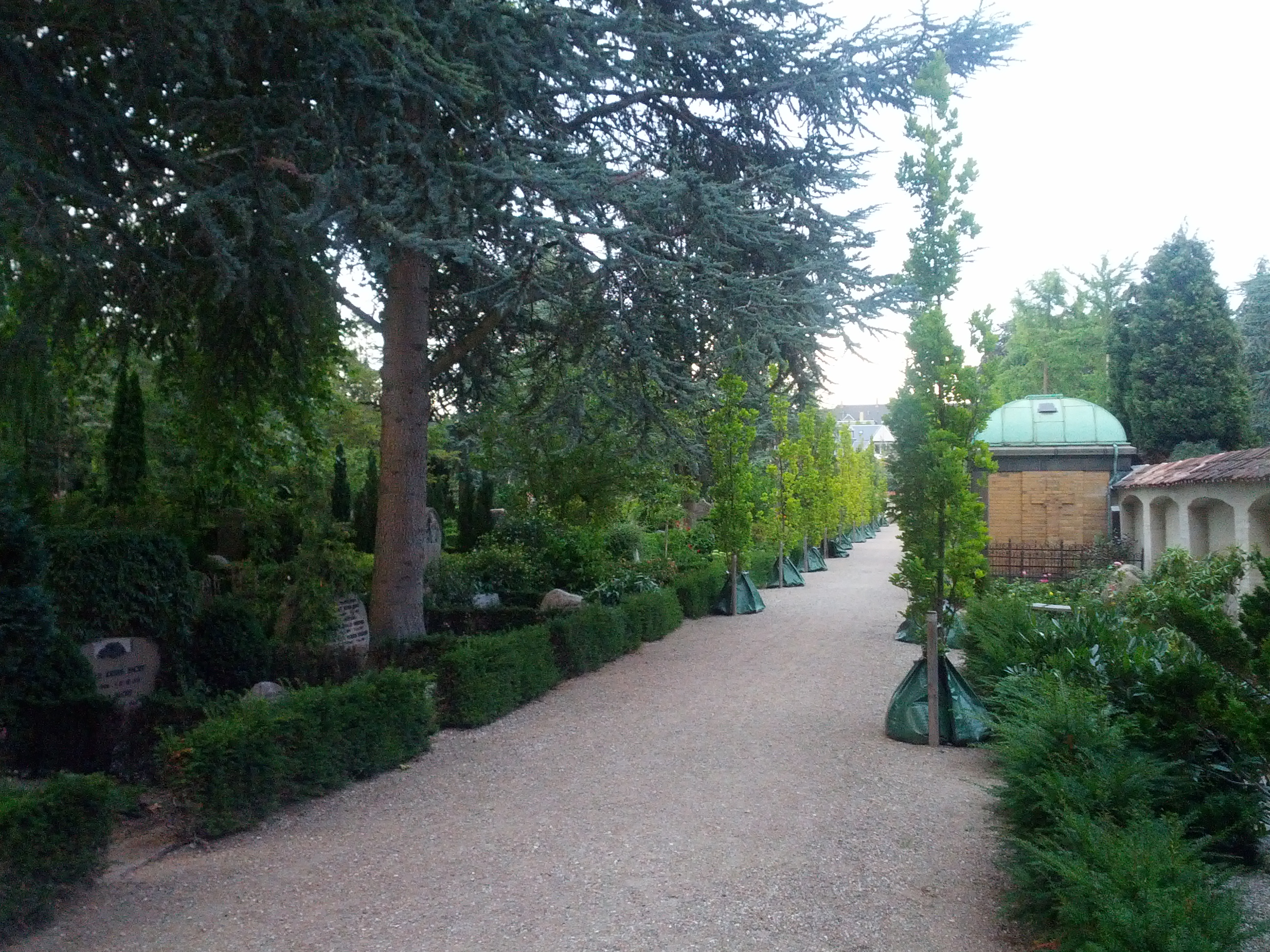

Frederiksberg Ældre Kirkegård is a cemetery in Frederiksberg, Copenhagen, Denmark. It was established in 1734 behind Frederiksberg Church.

== Burials ==
- C.F. Gerner Andersen
- Kai Normann Andersen
- Peter Andersen
- Christian Augustinus
- Ludvig Augustinus
- William Augustinus
- Jo Eirik Asvall
- Christian Bache
- Kristian Bahnson
- N.E. Bank-Mikkelsen
- Vilhelm Bardenfleth
- Frederik Barfod
- Thorkil Barfod
- Waldemar Gustav Otto Bauditz
- Johan Christian Theodor Bayer
- Julius August Bentzien
- Niels Viggo Bentzon
- Ole Berggreen
- Theodor Bergh
- F.J. Billeskov Jansen
- Gert Due Billing
- Børge Binderup
- Johanne Bindesbøll
- Michael Gottlieb Bindesbøll
- Thorvald Bindesbøll
- Anne Birch
- Ludvig Birkedal-Barfod
- Vilhelm Bjerring
- August Blom
- Holger Boland
- Kjeld Bonfils
- Ludvig Bramsen
- C.F. Bricka
- Edvard Brink
- Lily Broberg
- Ane Brügger
- Johannes Brøndsted
- Frederik Bøgh (nedlagt)
- Nicolai Bøgh
- Andreas Lorentz Casse
- Carl Claudius
- Jonas Collin
- Jonas Collin (zoologist)
- Ib Conradi
- Francesco Cristofoli
- Erik Dal
- Henrik Leonhard Danchell
- Augusta Dohlmann
- Carl Th. Dreyer
- Karl Einarson Dunganon
- Sofus Elvius
- Thomas Alfred English
- August Enna
- Jacob Erslev
- Kristian Erslev
- Poul Schack Eyber
- Ida Falbe-Hansen
- Povl Ole Fanger
- Lorry Feilberg
- Ludvig Feilberg
- Erik Fiehn (nedlagt)
- Philip Fischer
- N.J. Fjord
- Kate Fleron
- Flemming Flindt
- Kai Friis Møller
- Johanne Fritz-Petersen
- Ejnar Fugmann
- Aage Garde
- Louis Glass
- Asmund Gleerup
- Edvard Glæsel
- Ellen Gottschalch
- Jesper Gottschalch
- Peer Gregaard
- Gunnar Gregersen
- Svend Grundtvig
- Thorvald Gundestrup
- Erna Hamilton
- Constantin Hansen
- F.C.C. Hansen
- Johannes Harbou
- Uffe Harder
- Carl Harild
- Albert Helsengreen
- Axel Helsted
- Knud Ove Hilkier
- Geert Marinus Holbek
- Ludvig Holm
- Ludvig Holm
- Emil von Holstein-Rathlou
- N.P.C. Holsøe
- Poul Holsøe
- Kamilla Bech Holten
- Preben Hornung
- Carlo Hornung-Jensen
- Jens Christian Hostrup
- Sven Houmøller
- Georg Høeberg
- Jon Iversen
- Marius Jacobsen
- Jørgen Jensen
- Louis Jensen
- Lauritz Johansen
- Sigfred Johansen (lapidarium)
- Christian Juel
- Adolph Ditlev Jørgensen
- Harald Jørgensen
- Harald Kayser
- Andreas Kirkerup
- Adolph Kittendorff
- Axel Kittendorff
- Niels Kjærbølling
- Helge Kjærulff-Schmidt
- Marianne Kjærulff-Schmidt
- Hans Knudsen
- Bodil Koch
- Hal Koch
- Peter Christian Koch
- Brigitte Kolerus
- Svend Kragh-Jacobsen
- Knud Kristensen
- Hans Kruuse
- Ebbe Langberg
- Johan Lange (1818-1898)
- Johan Lange (1911-2007)
- Aage Langeland-Mathiesen
- J.P. Langgaard
- Siegfried Langgaard
- Holger Laumann
- Carl Liebenberg
- M.F. Liebenberg
- F.L. Liebenberg
- Nathalie Lind
- Vera Lindstrøm
- Viggo Lindstrøm
- Carl Lund
- F.C. Lund
- Ib Lunding
- Tage Lyneborg
- Harald Lønborg-Jensen
- Ib Makwarth
- Karl Mantzius
- Kristian Mantzius
- Sven Methling
- Peter Johan Monrad
- Jurij Moskvitin
- Hans Mossin
- Max Müller
- Poul Müller
- Henrik Møll
- Herdis Møllehave
- Aksel Møller
- Poul Møller
- Johan Sigismund von Mösting
- Johan Ludvig Nathansen
- Jonna Neiiendam
- Nicolai Neiiendam
- Tavs Neiiendam
- Sophus Neumann
- Johannes Neye
- Anna Nielsen
- Nicolai Peter Nielsen
- Jens Nordsø
- Povl Norholt
- Sigbjørn Obstfelder
- Adam Oehlenschläger
- Flemming John Olsen
- John Olsen
- C.V. Oppermann
- Ida Ørskov
- Christian Otterstrøm
- Christian Rasmus Otterstrøm
- Thomas Overskou
- Julius Paludan
- Johannes Pedersen
- Storm P
- Emil Poulsen
- Adolph Price
- Birgitte Price
- James Price (1761-1805)
- James Price (1801-1865)
- John Price
- Mathilde Price
- Waldemar Price
- William Wain Prior
- Erik Paaske
- Flemming Quaade
- Kamma Rahbek
- Knud Lyne Rahbek
- Paul Ramm
- P.G. Ramm
- Svend Rathsack
- Ellen Carstensen Reenberg
- Holger Reenberg
- Johan Jochum Reinau
- Knud Rex
- Vilhelm Richter
- C.V. Rimestad
- Lise Ringheim
- Ebbe Rode
- Edith Rode
- Helge Rode
- Martin Rode
- Mikal Rode
- Tony Rodian
- N.C. Rom
- Holger Rosenberg
- Claudius Rosenhoff
- Orla Rosenhoff
- Sofie Rostrup
- Aage Roussell
- Hans Morten Rubin
- Olaf Rude
- Otto Rung
- Albert Rüdinger
- Svend Saaby
- Avi Sagild
- Siegfried Salomon
- Peter Salskov
- Axel Salto
- Henrik Sartou
- Edel Saunte
- Jacob Saxtorph-Mikkelsen
- N.F. Schlegel
- Lisbeth Schlüter
- Hans Schneekloth
- Philip Schou
- Monna Schoubye
- Emil Schwanenflügel
- Ebbe Schwartz
- Frederik Vilhelm Schytte
- Martin Gottlieb Schäffer
- Tommy Seebach
- Hans Hartvig Seedorff
- H.P. Selmer
- Kristian Sick
- Harald Simonsen
- Frede Skaarup
- Lis Smed
- Hans Smidth
- Julius Smith
- Olga Smith
- Carl Johan Sonning
- Adolph Steen
- Vilhelm Storch
- Hans Tabor
- Andreas Charles Teilman
- Martinus Thomsen
- Christian L. Thuren
- Ejnar Thuren
- Hjalmar Thuren
- Christian Tiemroth (violinist)
- Christian Tiemroth (politician)
- Carl Trock-Madsen
- Troels Frederik Troels-Lund
- Hans Trojel
- J.K. Blok Tøxen
- Olaf Ussing
- Stephan Ussing (sculptor)
- Stephan Ussing (painter)
- W.J.A. Ussing
- Marguerite Viby
- Astrid Villaume
- N.H. Volkersen
- Aage von Kohl
- Mette von Kohl
- Gertie Wandel
- Kurt Westi
- Johannes Wilhjelm
- Ferdinand von Wimpffen
- Arthur Wittmaack
- Johannes Wolf
- Lise Wolf
- Otto B. Wroblewski
- Anders Sandøe Ørsted
- Lisbeth Høgsbro Østergaard
- Johan Aagaard
- Christian Aarøe
