= Tagea Brandt Rejselegat =

Danish award for women in science, literature or art

The Tagea Brandts Rejselegat (Travel Scholarship) is a Danish award to women who have made a significant contribution in science, literature or art. The grant, which is given without application, was created and endowed by Danish industrialist Vilhelm Brandt (1854–1921) in 1905 in honor of his wife, Tagea Brandt. It is awarded annually on 17 March, her birthday. The charter of 1922 provides that it shall be given to women in science, art, music, literature and theater arts (particularly in this case to actresses at the Royal Danish Theatre). The intent is for the awardee to both broaden her horizons while promoting Danish society abroad, and to benefit from vacation and rest time.

The first scholarships were given in 1924; the first time the amount was DKK 10.000, in 1958 it was increased to DKK 15.000, in 1967 to 25.000, later to 50,000, and currently it is DKK 75.000, which usually is given to 2-3 women annually.

== Recipients of the Tagea Brandt Award ==
Year	Recipients
2022	Anne Lise Marstrand-Jørgensen, Katrine Gislinge
2021	Kirstine Roepstorff, Jeanette Varberg
2020	Karen Grøn, Marie-Louise Bech Nosch
2019	Kirsten Klein
2018	Naja Marie Aidt, Mette Birkedal Bruun
2017	Lykke Friis, Bente Scavenius
2016	Eva Koch, Maiken Nedergaard
2015	Bente Lange
2014	Helle Fagralid
2013	Annmarie Lassen
2012	Cecilie Stenspil
2011	Lene Burkard
2010	Ulla M. Wewer
2009	Ida Jessen
2008	Lone Gram
2007	Nikoline Werdelin
2005	Vibeke Hjortdal, Bente Klarlund Pedersen
2004	Vibeke Mencke Nielsen, Elisabeth Møller Jensen
2003	May Schack, Paprika Steen
2002	Bine Bryndorf, Dorte Dahlin
2001	Anne Marie Løn, Linda Nielsen
2000	Kirsten Christensen, Christina Åstrand
1999	Vibeke Grønfeldt, Kirsten Nielsen
1998	Maja Lisa Engelhardt, Dorte Juul Jensen, Silja Schandorff
1997	Inger Dam-Jensen, Kirsten Lockenwitz, Marianne Schwartz
1996	Minna Skafte Jensen, Kirsten Thorup
1995	Kirsten Dehlholm, Elisabeth Meyer-Topsøe
1994	Gudrun Boysen, Ditte Gråbøl, Kirsten Ortwed
1993	Vita Andersen, Tina Kiberg, Brigitte Kolerus
1992	Merete Barker, Kirsten Hastrup
1991	Dyveke Helsted, Ulla Henningsen, Nanna Hertoft, Anita Jørgensen, Bodil Wamberg
1990	Martha Christensen, Karin Hammer, Heidi Ryom, Margrete Sørensen
1989	Lisbeth Balslev, Karen-Lise Mynster, Eva Steiness, Pia Tafdrup
1988	Inge Bjørn, Inge Bønnerup, Inger Dübeck, Dea Trier Mørch
1987	Kirsten Lehfeldt, Dorte Olesen, Hanne Marie Svendsen
1986	Else Marie Bukdahl, Annemarie Dybdal, Anne Øland
1985	Suzanne Brøgger, Anne E. Jensen, Inger Lous, Kirsten Olesen, Hanne Varming
1984	Lily Broberg, Margareta Mikkelsen, Inga Nielsen, Karin Nathorst Westfelt
1983	Ellen Andersen, Bodil Gøbel, Ann-Mari Max Hansen, Vera Myhre
1982	Marie-Louise Buhl, Linda Hindberg, Lis Jeppesen, Alev Siesbye, Elisabeth Westenholz
1981	Michala Petri, Elin Reimer, Ulla Ryum, Helle Thorborg, Mette Warburg
1980	Agnete Weis Bentzon, Bodil Gümoes, Berit Hjelholt, Dorrit Willumsen
1979	Inger Ejskjær, Else Paaske, Eva Sørensen
1978	Ester Boserup, Inger Christensen, Sorella Englund, Elsa Grave, Ida Ørskov
1977	Marie Bjerrum, Edith Guillaume
1976	Mette Hønningen, Edith Reske-Nielsen, Lise Warburg
1975	Cecil Bødker, Anna Ladegaard, Anne Riising, Astrid Villaume
1974	Tove Clemmensen, Vivi Flindt, Vibeke Klint, Ghita Nørby
1973	Grethe Heltberg, Bodil Udsen, Lise Østergaard
1972	Grethe Krogh, Birgitte Price, Kirsten Rosendal
1971	Lone Koppel, Grete Olsen, Elsa-Marianne von Rosen
1970	Margrethe Lomholt, Kirsten Simone, Esther Vagning, Lily Weiding
1969	Tove Birkelund, Gutte Eriksen, Bonna Søndberg, Susse Wold
1968	Else Margrete Gardelli, Anna Lærkesen, Agnete Munch-Petersen
1967	Kirsten Hermansen, Inge Lehmann, Lise Ringheim, Sally Salminen
1966	Franciska Clausen, Alette Garde, Elsa Gress, Bodil Jerslev Lund, Dora Sigurdsson, Agnete Zacharias
1965	Grethe Hjort, Inge Hvid-Møller, Berthe Qvistgaard
1964	Lisbeth Munch-Petersen, Sole Munck, Jane Muus, Liselotte Selbiger
1963	Erna Bach, Maria Garland, Anna Klindt Sørensen, Toni Lander
1962	Gudrun Brun, Lisa Engqvist, Tutter Givskov, Margrethe Schanne
1961	Else Alfelt, Henny Harald Hansen, Elise Wesenberg Lund
1960	Lise Engbæk, Tove Olafsson, Ragna Rask-Nielsen, Marie Wandel
1959	Eli Fischer-Jørgensen, Jolanda Rodio, Lilian Weber Hansen
1958	Helga Ancher, Sigrid Flamand Christensen, Ellen Gilberg, Ruth Guldbæk, Herdis von Magnus
1957	Else Marie Bruun, Sophie Petersen, Anne Marie Telmányi
1956	Marie Hammer, Elise Heide-Jørgensen, Elsa Sigfuss, Gertrud Vasegaard
1955	Marlie Brande, Marie Gudme Leth, Hilde Levi
1954	Else Jena, Inger Møller, Else Kai Sass
1953	Tove Ditlevsen
1952	Ingeborg Brams, Bodil Kjer
1951	Ellen Gottschalch, Margrethe Hald
1950	Augusta Unmack
1949	Dorothy Larsen, Edith Oldrup Pedersen, Agnete Varming
1948	Lis Ahlmann, Anna Borg, Henny Glarbo, Aase Hansen
1947	Erna Christensen, Elisabeth Hude, Ellen Birgitte Nielsen, Ebba Wilton
1946	Esther Ammundsen, Fanny Halstrøm, Gerda Henning, Juliana Sveinsdottir
1945	Inger Margrethe Boberg, Else Brems, Hulda Lütken, Else Schøtt, Ellen Thomsen
1944	Ellinor Bro Larsen, Margot Lander, Mary Schou, Johanne Skovgaard
1943	Karen Marie Hansen, Ellen Hartmann, Elisabeth Schmedes, Dagmar Starcke, Marie Weitze
1942	Thyra Eibe, Margrethe Gøthgen, Else Højgaard, Karin Nellemose, Elisabeth Svensgaard
1941	Anna E. Munch, Elisabeth Neckelmann, Sigrid Neiiendam, Sofie Rifbjerg, Liva Weel
1940	Bertha Dorph, Olivia Holm-Møller, Astrid Noack, Else Skouboe
1939	Karen Blixen, Elisif Fiedler, Ingeborg Nørregaard Hansen, Ingeborg Steffensen, Hedvig Strömgren, Julie Vinter Hansen
1938	Johanne Brun, Inge Lehmann, Gerda Ploug Sarp, Ulla Poulsen Skou, Christine Swane
1937	Birgit Engell, Astrid Friis, Nathalie Krebs, Clara Pontoppidan, Anna Schytte
1936	Elna Borch, Valborg Borchsenius, Karen Callisen, Ebba Carstensen, France Ellegaard
1935	Bodil Ipsen, Thit Jensen, Lilly Lamprecht, Valfrid Palmgren Munch-Petersen, Jonna Neiiendam, Johanne Ostenfeld Christiansen
1934	Karen Bramson, Marie Henriques, Johanne Krarup-Hansen, Eli Møller, Ida Møller
1933	Helvig Kinch, Edith Rode, Ingeborg Maria Sick, Birgit Trolle
1932	Elna Jørgen-Jensen, Tenna Kraft, Hortense Panum, Emilie Ulrich, Olga Wagner
1931	Ada Adler, Gunna Breuning-Storm, Astrid Ehrencron-Kidde
1930	Anna Bloch, Marie Krogh, Ingeborg Plockross Irminger
1929	Ellen Beck, Betty Nansen, Sofie Rostrup, Johanne Stockmarr
1928	Agnes Adler, Lis Jacobsen, Oda Nielsen, Agnes Slott-Møller
1927	Marie Bregendahl, Anna Hude, Gyrithe Lemche, Karin Michaëlis
1926	Elisabeth Dons, Anne Marie Carl-Nielsen
1925	Betty Hennings, Kirstine Meyer
1924	Anna Ancher, Ellen Jørgensen

== See also ==
- Tagea Brandt
- Women in Denmark
- List of awards honoring women
- List of European art awards
