= Helsted =

Helsted is a surname. Notable people with the surname include:

- Axel Helsted (1847–1907), Danish painter
- Carl Helsted (1818–1904), Danish composer
- Dyveke Helsted (1919–2005), Danish art historian and museum director
- Edvard Helsted (1816–1900), Danish composer
- Frederik Ferdinand Helsted (1809–1875), Danish painter and drawing master
- Gustav Helsted (1857–1924), Danish organist and composer
