= Kirsten Hermansen =

Danish operatic soprano and music pedagogue (1930–2015)

- Born: 21 February 1930; Copenhagen, Denmark
- Died: 8 November 2015 (aged 85); Denmark
- Education: Royal Danish Academy of Music
- Occupations: Soprano; Music pedagogue
- Years active: 1945–1983
- Spouse: Leif Rommer
- Awards: Knight of the Order of the Dannebrog

Kirsten Hermansen (21 February 1930 – 8 November 2015) was a Danish operatic soprano and music pedagogue who performed for the Royal Danish Theatre. She made her solo debut in 1954 and then had her official stage debut the following year. Hermansen taught singing at her alma mater, the Royal Danish Academy of Music, in 1972 and as an associate professor from 1981. She received the Tagea Brandt Rejselegat in 1967 and was appointed a Knight of the Order of the Dannebrog in 1969.

== Biography ==
On 21 February 1930, Hermansen was born in Copenhagen. She was the daughter of the head teacher Einar Holger Hermansen and the seamstress Kaja Louise Hessing and she was the youngest of five children in the family. Hermansen received tutoring from Eskild Rask Nielsen, and was educated at both the Royal Danish Academy of Music and the Opera Academy, studying under Holger Byrding at the university and after her graduation. She studied at an opera school under the tutelage of the drama teacher Anna Borg between 1953 and 1955.

She joined the Danish Radio Girls' Choir and gained singing and speaking roles in its musical performances. Hermansen gained national recognition when she was cast as the voice of the princess in the first ever Danish all-night cartoon Fyrtøjet in 1945. She also got the role of a child in Albert Herring by Benjamin Britten at the Royal Danish Academy of Music. In 1954, Hermansen had her solo debut at the Royal Danish Music Conservatory, and the following year made her official stage debut as Lucia in Britten's The Rape of Lucretia, for which she received critical praise. Following her playing Lucia in The Rake's Progress, she sung the role of Susanna in the premiere of The Marriage of Figaro by Wolfgang Amadeus Mozart, and remained in the role for the following seventeen years. The role was described by critics as her breakthrough role. Hermansen also had roles in Mozart plays such as Blonde in Die Entführung aus dem Serail, Despina and Fiordiligi in Cosi fan tutte, The Queen of the Night in The Magic Flute, Rosina in La finta semplice, and the Marchioness in Der Rosenkavalier, a role that was broadcast on television.

Hermansen also performed the roles of Gilda in Rigoletto, Norina in Don Pasquale, Olympia in Hoffmann's Adventures, Zerbinetta in Ariadne auf Naxos, Hilde Mack in Elegy for Young Lovers for the Royal Danish Theatre. In 1972, Hermansen began teaching singing at the Royal Danish Academy of Music and became an associate professor at the institution nine years later. She taught the likes of Tina Kiberg, Elsebeth Lund, Susse Lillesøe, Michael Melbye and Johan René Schmidt. Hermansen partook in several concerts and recordings for Danmarks Radio, such as La sonnambula by Vincenzo Bellini in 1968. In 1983, she retired as a soprano opera singer.

== Personal life ==
She was married to the double bassist Leif Rommer from Copenhagen. In 1969, Hermansen was appointed Knight of the Order of the Dannebrog. She died on 8 November 2015.

== Legacy ==
Hermansen was described as not being "at all aristocratic, and with her good humour she was popular among her friends" and as having also contributed significantly "from her young years in the Danish Radio Girls' Choir to the great operetta roles with the Entertainment Orchestra and Grete Kolbe." Hermansen received various honorary awards for her work. She won the Musikanmelderringens kunstnerpris in 1956, the inaugural Elisabeth Dons' Memorial Scholarship in 1962, and Tagea Brandt Rejselegat in 1967.
