= Sorella =

Sorella is the Italian word for sister. It may also refer to:

- Sorella eminibey, a synonym of the Chestnut sparrow
- Thérèse Ansingh, Dutch artist (1883–1968) who used Sorella as a pseudonym

== See also ==
- Sorella Englund (born 1945), Finnish and Danish ballet dancer
- Mus sorella, a species of mouse
