= Michala Petri =

Danish recorder player (born 1958)

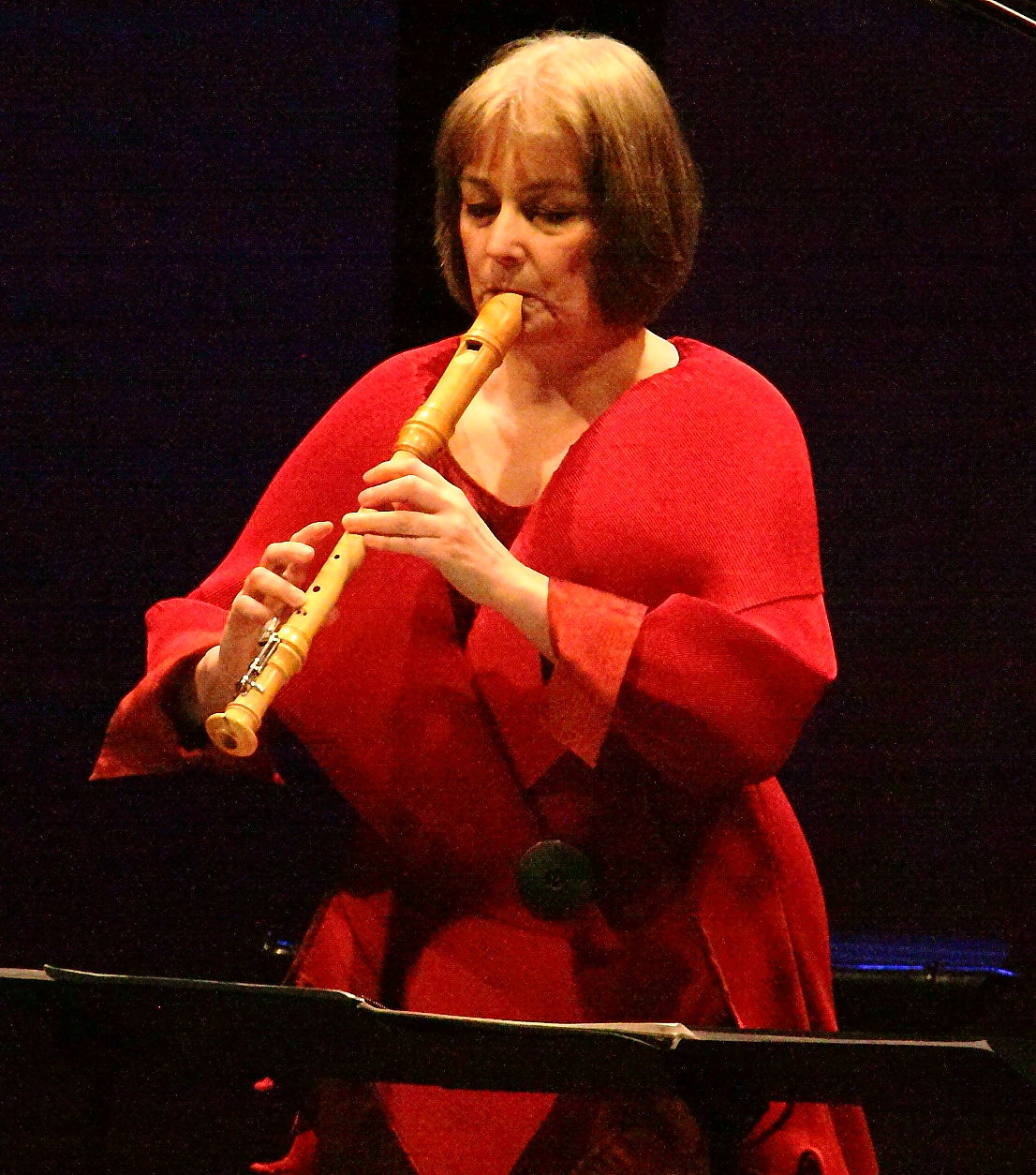
- Michala Petri at the Other Minds festival in 2013

Background information
- Born: 7 July 1958 (age 68); Hobro, Denmark
- Genres: Baroque, contemporary
- Occupation: Solo musician
- Instrument: Recorder
- Years active: 1969–present

Michala Petri (born 7 July 1958) is a Danish recorder player. She is celebrated for her technical virtuosity and versatility across various musical styles. She made her solo debut in 1969, at age eleven.

== Biography ==
Petri, who began playing the recorder at the age of three, is noted for her virtuosity and versatility across a wide range of styles, from the baroque repertoire of the height of the instrument's popularity to contemporary works written particularly for her. She first played on Danish Radio at the age of five, and her debut performance as a soloist was at Copenhagen's Tivoli concert hall in 1969 when she was 11. She has performed premiers of dozens of works, by Malcolm Arnold, Gordon Jacob and Richard Harvey, as well as Daniel Börtz, Erik Haumann, Hans Kunstovny, Erling Bjerno, Thomas Koppel, Ove Benzen, Vagn Holmboe, Piers Hellawell, Gary Kulesha, Asger Lund Christiansen, Egil Harder, Michael Berkeley, Butch Lacy, Miklos Maros, Ezra Laderman, Jens Bjerre, Henning Christiansen, Niels Viggo Bentzon, Axel Borup Jørgensen, and Gunnar Berg. She performed Vittorio Monti's Csardas with comedian-pianist Victor Borge at his eightieth birthday. She called that by far the hardest challenge of her professional career.

She married guitarist and lutenist Lars Hannibal in 1992. Although they divorced in 2010, they still perform together and have given over 1,500 concerts and made numerous recordings. Together they founded the record company OUR Recordings. Petri has taken a particular interest in the combination of recorder and guitar, collaborating with guitarists including Göran Söllscher, Kazuhito Yamashita and Manuel Barrueco. One notable collaboration of hers was two albums of sonatas by J. S. Bach and G. F. Handel, with Keith Jarrett on harpsichord; she has also recorded with the London Philharmonic Orchestra, the English Chamber Orchestra, and Pinchas Zukerman, among many others.

Petri studied with Prof. Ferdinand Conrad at the Staatliche Hochschule für Musik und Theater in Hannover, partly because she was still too young to become a full-time student in Denmark. She gave a debut recital for BBC radio in March 1976, and the BBC released a recorded recital in 1977. Leo Black's sleeve note for this recording remarks, "one realises what can happen when a mighty talent starts young enough." Her mother is Hanne Petri, who studied at the Royal Danish Academy of Music, and her brother, David Petri, won the Danish "Young Musician of the Year Award" in 1978. He is a cellist. Both have recorded with Michala as The Petri Trio (or Michala Trio). In 1979 she began an exclusive recording contract with Philips Records that lasted until 1987; she is currently recording on the RCA Red Seal label. She is the step-granddaughter of Danish actress Ingeborg Brams.

== Partial discography ==
- Michala Petri Recorder Recital, BBC Records (1977). Works by van Eyck, Castello, Telemann, Heberle and Berio.
- Los Angeles Street Concerto – Petri plays Koppel
- Souvenir with Lars Hannibal
- Moonchild's Dream with the English Chamber Orchestra
- Scandinavian Moods with the London Philharmonic Orchestra
- The Ultimate Recorder Collection with Those above, The Westminster Abbey Choir, Keith Jarrett, and Moscow Virtuoso (on separate tracks)
- Grieg Holberg Suite, Melody & Dances with the English Chamber Orchestra
- Greensleeves with Hanne and David Petri
- Bach: Flute Sonatas (1992) played on recorder with Keith Jarrett on harpsichord
- Bach: Flute Sonatas (2019) played on recorder with Mahan Esfahani on harpsichord and Hille Perl on viola da gamba.

== Awards ==
- Tagea Brandt Rejselegat (1981)
- Knight – Order of the Dannebrog 1995
- Deutscher Schallplattenpreis 1997
- H. C. Lumbye Prize 1998
- Wilhelm Hansen Music Prize 1998
- Léonie Sonning Music Prize 2000; she was the third Dane to win this prize, after Mogens Wöldike (1976) and Per Nørgård (1996)

== Other sources ==
- Program notes from various CDs, Including Philips CD #420 897-2 "Greensleeves"
