= Lars Hannibal =

Danish classical guitarist and lutenist (born 1951)

Lars Hannibal (born 15 July 1951 in Aarhus) is a Danish classical guitarist and lutenist who frequently performs with his ex-wife Michala Petri playing the recorder.

== Biography ==
Hannibal grew up in Aarhus where he was first inspired by the music of Bob Dylan, The Beatles and the Rolling Stones. He extended his interest to the classical guitar after listening to Andrés Segovia playing Bach.

He studied the guitar at the Aarhus conservatory and the lute in The Hague with Toyohiko Satoh, completing his studies in 1980. Since 1972, he has taught music at the Peter Sabroe National Institute for Social Educators in Aarhus and occasionally plays in rock bands.

In 1992, he married Michala Petri with whom he has given over 1,500 concerts and made numerous recordings. They divorced in 2010 although they still perform together. Together they founded the record company OUR Recordings. Hannibal has also performed with a number of other artists including the violinist Kim Sjøgren, the trumpeter Michael Brydenfelt, and later the Chinese violinist Tina Chen Yi. He has taken a special interest in China where he organized a Gala Concert in the Danish Pavilion at the 2010 Shanghai World Expo. His project Dialogue—East meets West encourages artistic discussion between Denmark and China.
