= Einar Englund =

Finnish composer (1916–1999)

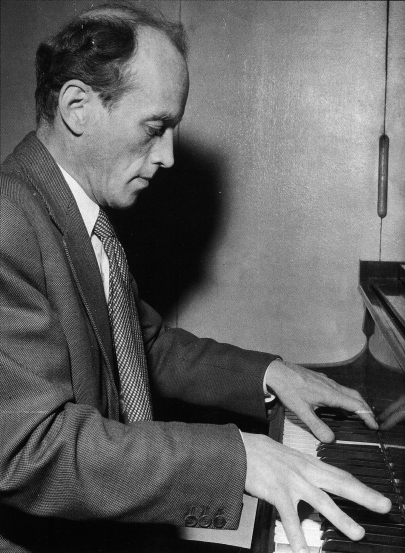
Einar Englund at the piano (1957).

Sven Einar Englund (17 June 1916 – 27 June 1999) was a Finnish composer.

== Life ==
Sven Einar Englund was born at Ljugarn in Gotland, Sweden, on 17 June 1916; he died on 27 June 1999 in Visby, Sweden. He married twice: in 1941 to Meri Mirjam Gyllenbögel, who died 1956 (they had one son and two daughters including the ballerina and choreographer Sorella Englund); and in 1958 he married Maynie Sirén, a singer, with whom he had one son.

One of the most important Finnish symphonists since Jean Sibelius, Englund was a native Swedish speaker who often felt that his career was sidelined from the mainstream of Finnish music.

He went to Svenska normallyceum i Helsingfors and was 17 when he began studies at the Helsinki Conservatory (now the Sibelius Academy) in 1933. Already a considerable pianist, he continued his studies with Martti Paavola and Ernst Linko while studying composition with Bengt Carlson and Selim Palmgren.

Following his graduation in 1941, Englund was conscripted into military service. During his time in the Finnish Continuation War he was wounded in his hand, which almost brought to an end his hopes of pursuing a career as a concert pianist. He would often recall the bizarre, though life-threatening incident, with a smile.

== Music ==
Englund's first work for large orchestra was his First Symphony (1946), which became known as the "War Symphony". This was no apprentice piece; the use of counterpoint, dissonance and orchestration of singular clarity reveals a master at work. His Second Symphony, the "Blackbird Symphony", soon followed.

In 1949 Englund was awarded a grant to study in the United States with Aaron Copland, and he also played jazz with Leonard Bernstein. It has been suggested that Englund's study with the American master consisted of discussions about music and composition, Copland having realised that there was little he could teach the younger man.

Throughout the 1950s he produced a series of large-scale works including Sinuhe, a ballet (1953) originally for piano though later orchestrated, and Odysseus (1959), written for the Swedish dancer and choreographer Birgit Cullberg, a Cello Concerto (1954) and the First Piano Concerto (1955), as well as film scores and incidental music. His score for Erik Blomberg's Valkoinen peura (The White Reindeer), which won a Jussi Award (the Finnish Oscar), and his score for Max Frisch's play The Great Wall of China are particularly notable.

He composed music for twenty films, as well as works for choir including the Hymnus Sepulcralis (1975).

During the 1950s, with his second wife, the singer Maynie Sirén, he performed a cabaret act; he was music critic of the Swedish-language Hufvudstadsbladet, and he taught at the Sibelius Academy from 1958 until 1982.

His Third Symphony (1971) appeared 23 years after his second and signalled his return to composition; he had written only a few works during the 1960s. There soon followed his Fourth (1976) and Fifth Symphonies (1977) and the Concerto for Twelve Cellos (1981).

Englund's Sixth Symphony (1984), subtitled Aphorisms, is in six movements for chorus and orchestra; his last symphony, the Seventh, was composed in 1988, coinciding with the onset of the heart disease that signalled a decline in health and would ultimately lead to his death. His Clarinet Concerto of 1991 was completed shortly before a stroke rendered further composition physically impossible. Later he suffered from kidney failure, which necessitated dialysis for the remainder of his life.

Englund also composed chamber music, including a suite for solo cello and a sonata for cello and piano; there are also works for violin and piano, solo trombone, and solo piano.

His memoirs, I Skuggan av Sibelius (In the Shadow of Sibelius), were published in 1997. His work was also part of the music event in the art competition at the 1948 Summer Olympics.

== Works ==
=== Stage ===
- The Great Wall of China, incidental music to play (1949)
- Sinuhe, ballet (1954)
- Odysseus, ballet after Homer (1959)

=== Orchestral ===
- Symphonies
  - Symphony No. 1 The War Symphony (1946)
  - Symphony No. 2 Blackbird (1948)
  - Symphony No. 3 Barbarossa (1971)
  - Symphony No. 4 Nostalgic, for strings and percussion (1976)
  - Symphony No. 5 Sinfonia Fennica (1977)
  - Symphony No. 6 Aphorisms for choir and orchestra (1984)
  - Symphony No. 7 (1988)
- Epinikia (1947)
- Kiinan muuri, suite from The Great Wall of China (1949)
- Valse Uralia (1951)
- Valkoinen peura, suite from The White Reindeer (1954)
- Serenata elegiaca for string orchestra (1983)
- Juhlasoitto 1917 (1986)
- Odeion (1987)
- Ciacona: Hommage a Sibelius (1990)

=== Concertante ===
- Cello Concerto (1954)
- Piano Concerto No. 1 (1955)
- Piano Concerto No. 2 (1974)
- Violin Concerto (1981)
- Flute Concerto (1985)
- Clarinet Concerto (1990–1991)

=== Chamber/Instrumental ===
- Piano Quintet (1941)
- Introduzione e capriccio for violin and piano (1970)
- Panorama for trombone (1976)
- Divertimento Upsaliensis for wind quintet, string quintet and piano (1978)
- Violin Sonata (1979)
- Arioso interrotto for violin (1979)
- Serenata elegiaco for violin (1979)
- Concerto for 12 Cellos (1980–1981)
- Cello Sonata (1982)
- Piano Trio (1982)
- Pavane for violin and piano (1983)
- String Quartet (1985)
- Suite for solo cello Viimeinen saari (The Last Island) (1986)
- Intermezzo for oboe (1987)
- Wind Quintet (1989)

=== Brass ===
- De profundis for 14 brass instruments (1980)
- Lahti-fanfaari for 11 brass instruments (1986)
- Opening Brass for 15 brass instruments (1988)
- Vivat academia, fanfare for brass ensemble or brass quintet (1989)

=== Keyboard ===
- Humoresque for piano (1935)
- Introduzione e Toccata for piano (1950)
- Preludium for piano (1955)
- The Lauttasaari Rotary Club Festive March (1957)
- Piano Sonatina No. 1 (Sonatine in d) (1966)
- Little Toccata for piano (1966)
- Sicilienne for piano (1966)
- Notturno for piano (1967)
- Passacaglia for organ (1971)
- Marche funebre for organ (1976)
- Piano Sonata No. 1 (1978)
- Pavane e Toccata for piano (1983)
- Piano Sonatina No. 2 The Parisian (1984)
- Prelude & Fughetta: Hommage a Bach for piano (1986)

=== Choral/Vocal ===
- Chaconne for choir, trombone and double bass (1969)
- Hymnus sepulcralis (1975)
- Kanteletar-sarja (1984)

=== Film music ===
- Omena putoaa (1952)
- Valkoinen peura The White Reindeer (1952)
- Kaikkien naisten monni (1952)
- ...ja Helena soittaa (1952)
- Yhden yön hinta (1952)
- Kultaa ja kunniaa (1953)
- Näkemiin Helena (1954)
- Muistojen kisakesä 1952 (1954)
- Rakkaus kahleissa (1959)
- Ratkaisun päivät (1956)
- Jokin ihmisessä (1956)
- The Stranger (1957)
- No Tomorrow (1957)
- Verta käsissämme (1958)
- Asessorin naishuolet (1958)
- Äidittömät (1958)
- Pojat (1962)
- Preludes to Ecstasy (1962)
- Ett fat amontillado (1963)
