= Ludvig Holm =

Danish musician (1858–1928)

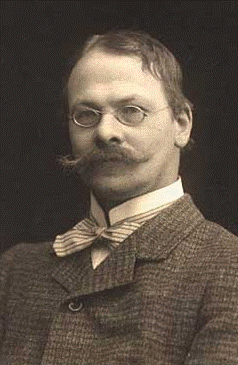

Ludvig Sophus Adolph Theodor Holm (24 December 1858 – 8 April 1928) was a Danish violinist and composer.

== Personal life ==
Holm's father was the composer William Christian Holm, who was also a violist in the Royal Danish Orchestra. From 1875-1878 he studied at the Royal Danish Academy of Music under Valdemar Tofte, Edmund Neupert, JPE Hartmann, Niels W. Gade and Johan Christian Gebauer.

He died on 8 April 1928 in Copenhagen and was buried at Frederiksberg Ældre Kirkegård.

== Career ==
In 1880 he joined the chapel where he from 1900 to 1917 he was concertmaster. He was for many years Vice-President of the Copenhagen Chamber Music Society and for many years the artistic director of the People's Concerts. From 1911 to its end in 1920, he was head of the CFE Horneman conservatory, on whose board he sat beginning in 1906. From 1922 until his death he was a teacher at the Royal Conservatoire. He also sat on the main board of the Danish Composers' Association until 1909 and was the Order of Dannebrog.

== Notable works ==
- op. 1 Fire sange
- op. 2 Klavervariationer
- op. 3 klaver
- op. 4 klaver
- op. 5 Strygekvartet E^{b}-dur
- op. 6 Violinkoncert (1905)
- op. 7 Klaverkvintet
- op. 8 Strygekvartet i B^{b}-dur (1913/1916/1924)
- op. 9 klaver
- op. 10 Symfonisk fragment (1927)
- Sonate i C-dur (for the conservatoire's entry exam, 1874)
- Allegretto (piano, 1882)
- Promenade (piano, 1882)
- Uset af Verdens Øie og Den Menneskesøn, som født af Gud (chorus, 1883)
- Reinald synger (chorus, 1883)
- Foraarsstemninger Sonate for Piano-Forte (1888)
- Serenade (piano, 1888)
- Praeludium (organ, 1901)
- Con brio (piano, 1905)
- Andante espressivo (klaver 1907)
- Ländler (piano, 1915)
- Kærlighed, Danmarks Æventyr (for the Tivoli Revue, 1916)
- Trois petites valses (Tirolienne, Valse lente, Ländler; 1916)
- Fire Fantasiestykker for Klaver (1917)
- Allegretto quasi Andantino klaver (1923)
- Vaarbrud og Fuglestemmer klaver (1922)

== See also ==
- List of Danish composers
