= Thyra Eibe =

Danish mathematician and translator

- Born: 3 November 1866; Copenhagen, Denmark
- Died: 4 January 1955 (aged 88); Copenhagen, Denmark
- Education: University of Copenhagen
- Occupations: Mathematician, translator

Thyra Eibe (3 November 1866 – 4 January 1955) was a Danish mathematician and translator, the first woman to earn a mathematics degree from the University of Copenhagen. She is known for her translation of Euclid's Elements into the Danish Language.

== Education and career ==
Eibe was one of ten children of a Copenhagen bookseller. After completing a degree in historical linguistics in 1889 from N. Zahle's School (then a girls' school), Eibe studied mathematics at the University of Copenhagen, and earned a cand.mag. there in 1895. She returned to Zahle's School as a teacher, also teaching boys at Slomann's School and becoming the first woman to become an advanced mathematics teacher for boys in Denmark. In 1898 she moved to H. Adler Community College, later to become the Sortedam Gymnasium, where she remained until 1934, serving as principal for a year in 1929–1930.

== Contributions ==
In undertaking her translation of Euclid, Eibe was motivated by the earlier work of Danish historian Johan Ludvig Heiberg, who published an edition of Euclid's Elements in its original Greek, with translations into Latin.

As well as her translations, Eibe wrote several widely used Danish mathematics textbooks.

== Recognition ==
In 1942, she was given the Tagea Brandt Rejselegat, an award for Danish woman who have made a significant contribution in science, literature or art.
