= Danish Actors' Association =

Danish trade union

- Dansk Skuespillerforbund

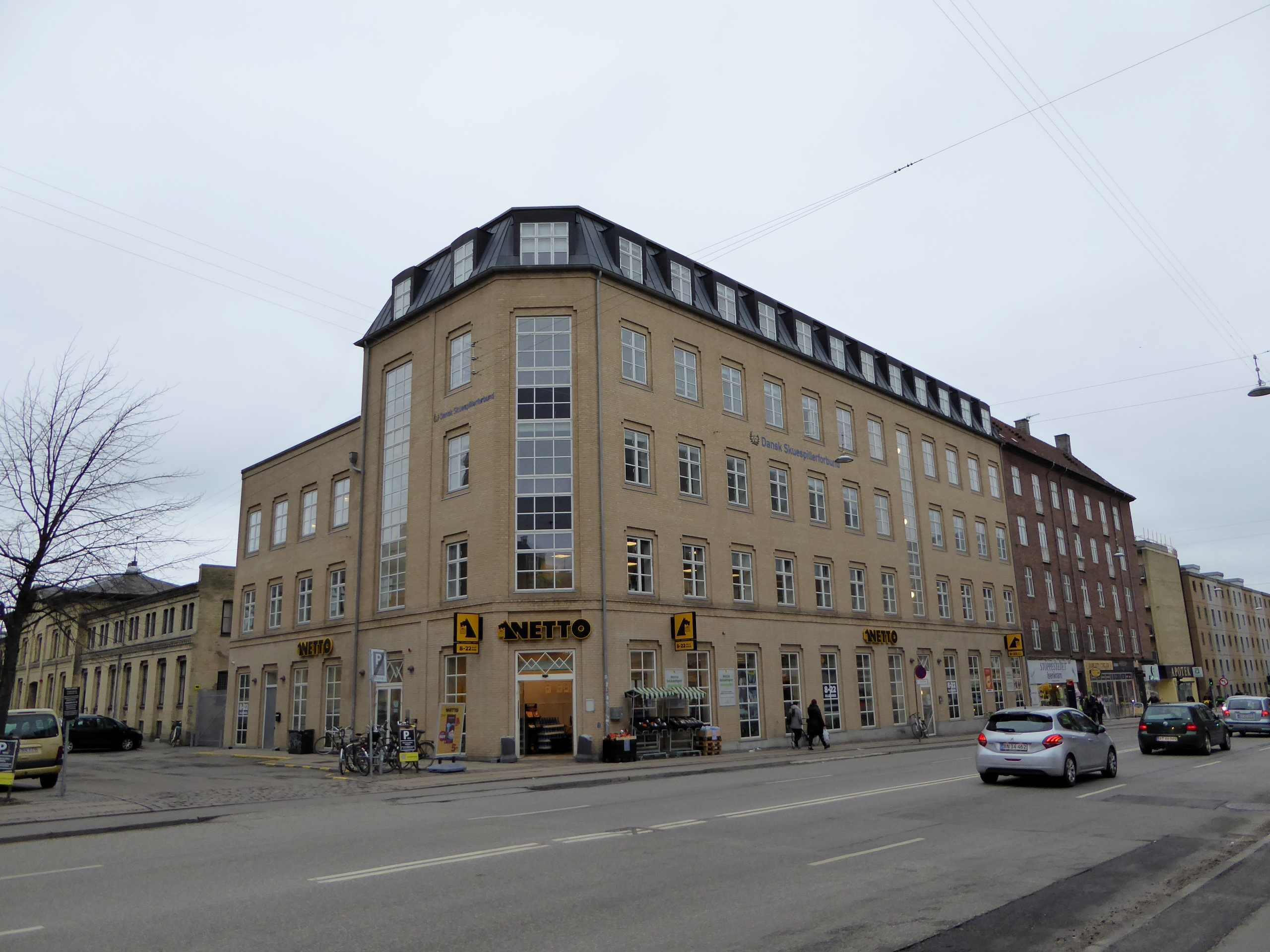
- Headquarters in Copenhagen
- Abbreviation: DSF
- Established: 1904; 122 years ago
- Founder: Karl Mantzius
- Founded at: Copenhagen
- Type: Trade union
- Headquarters: Tagensvej 85, 3. sal 2200 København N
- Location: Denmark
- Coordinates: 55.702543°N 12.5460393°E
- Fields: Acting
- Members: 1,986 (2018)
- Official language: Danish
- Director: Maria Ventegodt
- Foreperson: Benjamin Boe Rasmussen
- Affiliations: Danish Trade Union Confederation, International Federation of Actors, Nordic Acting Council
- Website: skuespillerforbundet.dk

The Danish Actors' Association (Danish: Dansk Skuespillerforbund, DSF) is a trade union representing actors, dancers, choreographers and opera singers in Denmark.

The union was founded in 1904 by Karl Mantzius, as one of the first actors' unions in the world. It initially focused on improving the pay and reducing the working hours of actors, and also on boosting their social status. In 1910, it for the first time signed an agreement with theatre owners in Copenhagen. Litten Hansen was the first female chair of the Association.

The union was a member of the Confederation of Professionals in Denmark for many years, and since 2019 has been part of its successor, the Danish Trade Union Confederation. At various times, it has worked closely with other unions in the industry, such as the Association of Danish Stage Instructors, the Association of Danish Scenographers, and the Film Workers' Association. It now also has agreements covering film and television, and works closely with the Danish copyright organisations.

The union is affiliated to the International Federation of Actors, and the Nordic Acting Council. In 2018, it had 1,964 members.
