= Lone Gram =

Danish microbiologist

- Born: 10 August 1960 (age 66)
- Education: Royal Veterinary and Agricultural University
- Scientific career
- Thesis: Identification, characterization, and inhibition of bacteria isolated from tropical fish (1989)

Lone Gram is Danish microbiologist known for her work in bacterial physiology, microbial communication, and biochemicals that originate from bacterial cultures. She is an elected member of the Royal Danish Academy of Sciences and Letters and has received the Order of the Dannebrog.

== Education and career ==
Gram's first microbiology course led her away from her initial career interests in medicine, and into marine bacteria. Gram has both an M.Sc. (1985) and a Ph.D. (1989) from the Royal Veterinary and Agricultural University in Denmark. Following her Ph.D., Gram joined the Technological Laboratory of the Danish Ministry of Fishes. In 2010 she was promoted to professor at the Technical University of Denmark. Gram has also spent time working at Harvard Medical School and at the University of New South Wales.

== Research ==
Gram's research centers on the physiology of bacteria in the environment and using bacteria for biotechnology. Her early research examined variability in the bacteria found in spoiled fish, removing bacterial biofilms, and preventing biofilms using compounds from the red algae Delisea pulchra. She has examined the interactions across different species of bacteria, and the production of compounds that send messages among bacteria. Her research includes investigations bacterial attachment to surfaces, and quantification of hydrogen sulfide production by bacteria associated with fish. From 2006 until 2007, Gram participated in the Galathea 3 expeditions, and she is using the bacterial cultures initiated during the project to mine bacteria for chemical compounds that may be useful to people. Gram's research extends to investigations of the global distribution of bacterial species, and an examination of how the presence of varying nutrients alters the chemical compounds produced by bacteria.

== Selected publications ==
- Gram, Lone; Huss, Hans Henrik (1996-11-01). "Microbiological spoilage of fish and fish products". International Journal of Food Microbiology. Specific Spoilage Organisms. 33 (1): 121–137. doi:10.1016/0168-1605(96)01134-8. ISSN 0168-1605. PMID 8913813.
- Gram, Lone; Melchiorsen, Jette; Spanggaard, Bettina; Huber, Ingrid; Nielsen, Torben F. (1999-03-01). "Inhibition of Vibrio anguillarum byPseudomonas fluorescens AH2, a Possible Probiotic Treatment of Fish". Applied and Environmental Microbiology. 65 (3): 969–973. Bibcode:1999ApEnM..65..969G. doi:10.1128/AEM.65.3.969-973.1999. PMC 91130. PMID 10049849.
- Huber, I.; Spanggaard, B.; Appel, K.F.; Rossen, L.; Nielsen, T.; Gram, L. (2004). "Phylogenetic analysis and in situ identification of the intestinal microbial community of rainbow trout (Oncorhynchus mykiss, Walbaum)". Journal of Applied Microbiology. 96 (1): 117–132. doi:10.1046/j.1365-2672.2003.02109.x. ISSN 1364-5072. PMID 14678165. S2CID 23137898.
- Gram, Lone; Grossart, Hans-Peter; Schlingloff, Andrea; Kiørboe, Thomas (2002). "Possible Quorum Sensing in Marine Snow Bacteria: Production of Acylated Homoserine Lactones by Roseobacter Strains Isolated from Marine Snow". Applied and Environmental Microbiology. 68 (8): 4111–4116. Bibcode:2002ApEnM..68.4111G. doi:10.1128/aem.68.8.4111-4116.2002. ISSN 4111-4116. PMC 123997. PMID 12147515.

== Awards and honors ==
In 2008, Gram received Tagea Brandt Rejselegat, an award given to Danish women to recognize significant contributions in science, literature, or art. In 2016, Gram received the Villum Kann Rasmussen Annual Award in Science and Technology, which is given in recognition of "a particularly valuable contribution to the technical and natural sciences". In 2018, she received the Order of the Dannebrog. In 2020, Gram was elected a member of the Royal Danish Academy of Sciences and Letters.

== Personal life ==
Gram's great-grandfather was Hans Christian Gram who developed the Gram stain, a commonly used technique in microbial ecology. Gram is also distantly related to the Danish historian Hans Gram.
