= Dorte Olesen =

Danish mathematician

Dorte Marianne Olesen (born 1948) is a Danish mathematician. In 1988 at Roskilde University, she became the first Danish woman to be appointed a full professor of mathematics. She has also played a leading role in the development of education and research networks, both in Denmark and at the European level.

== Early life, education, and family ==
Born on 8 January 1948 in Hillerød, she was the daughter of the medical specialist and academic Knud Henning Olesen (1920–2007) and the physician Irene Mariane Pedersen (1919–2004). After matriculating from Sortedam Gymnasium in Copenhagen, following in her parents¨footsteps she began to read medicine at Copenhagen University, hoping to become a biophysicist. As this was not possible, she studied mathematics instead, graduating in 1973 and receiving the university's gold medal for a dissertation on operator algebra. She went on to Odense University where she received a Lic.Scient (equivalent to a PhD) in mathematics in 1975.

She also went on study trips to Philadelphia (1971–72) and Marseille (1974 & 1979) and was a guest professor at Berkeley (1984–85).

When she was 23, Olesen married one of her assistant teachers at Copenhagen University, Gert Kjærgaard Pedersen (1940–2004), who became a prominent mathematics professor. Together they had three children, Just (born 1976), Oluf (1980) and Cecilie (1984).

== Career ==
Olesen returned to Copenhagen University as a senior scholar in 1975, becoming a lecturer at the university's mathematical institute in 1980. In 1988, she was appointed Professor of Mathematics at Roskilde University, the first Danish woman to become a full professor in the field.

In 1989, she was appointed executive director of UNI-C, a Danish government department devoted to promoting the use of information technology in research and education. She managed the development of UNI-C until 2011, establishing the Danish NREN research network, developing computer services and experimenting with online support for education. In parallel, she also promoted the use of the internet for education, including its use in elementary schools, and supported the development of e-business for Denmark.

At the European level, in 1992 Olesen became a member of the European Commission's High Performance Computing and Networking Advisory Committee. From 2001 to 2005, she served on the commission's Expert Group on ICT in Education while acting as president of TERENA, the Trans-European Research and Education Networking Association, from 2003 to 2009. From 2010 to 2011 she participated in the commission's High Level Expert Group on the Future of GÉANT. In 2013, she was a member of the Expert Group on the Implementation of the ERA Communications. Finally, from 2014 to 2017, she served on the Board of Directors of GÉANT during the merger of DANTE and TERENA.

== Awards ==
In 1992, Olesen was awarded the Order of the Dannebrog and in 2000, was honoured as a Knight of the First Class. She received the Tagea Brandts Rejselegat in 1987.
