= Heidi Ryom =

Danish ballerina and educator

- Born: Heidi Ryom Kristensen; 26 August 1955 (age 70); Copenhagen, Denmark
- Died: 5 October 2013 (aged 58); Denmark
- Occupations: Ballerina; Educator
- Years active: 1974–2007
- Spouse: Julian Ringdahl (m. 1995–1999)
- Children: 1
- Awards: Knight First Class of the Order of the Dannebrog; Tagea Brandt Rejselegat

Heidi Ryom Kristensen (26 August 1955 – 5 October 2013) was a Danish ballerina and educator for the Royal Danish Ballet. She began dancing at the Royal Danish Ballet school and became an in 1972 before being made a corps dancer at the Royal Danish Ballet two years later. In 1982, Ryom was appointed principal solo dancer at the Royal Danish Theatre before retiring from her position as a solo dancer in 1997 and became a character dancer and educator. She was appointed Knight of the Order of the Dannebrog in 1988 and was promoted to Knight First Class of the Order of the Dannebrog eight years later.

== Biography ==
On 26 August 1955, Ryom was born Heidi Ryom Kristensen in Copenhagen. She was the daughter of the car dealer Kurt Kristensen and Jette Ryom. Ryom was educated at the Royal Danish Ballet school, which is situated on the grounds of the Danish Royal Theatre. In 1972, she became an aspirant, and graduated in 1974. Ryom was made a corps dancer at the Royal Danish Ballet that same year. In 1979, she made her debut in Pas de deux in Flower Festival in Genzano with Ib Andersen as a partner and was a dancer in a wide variety of ballets by August Bournonville.

In 1980, Ryom played the part of the bespectacled Helena in A Midsummer Night's Dream and as Svanhilda in Coppélia by Hans Brenaa the following year. She was appointed solo dancer (principal) at the Royal Danish Theatre in 1982. The following year, Ryom had a role in Korsaren by Erik Bruhn and was cast in the role of Kitri in Don Quixote the same year. She played alongside Toni Lander and Lise Landers in Études in 1984 and the title role of Juliet in Romeo and Juliet by John Neumeier three years later. Ryom entered into a working partnership with Julio Bocca in 1988, and they guested across the globe. In 1989, she played the roles of Alli in Månerenen and Tatjana in Onegin. Ryom was cast as the title roles in Gisellein 1990, La Sylphide two years later, the ballerina Piano Concerto No. 2 by Pyotr Ilyich Tchaikovsky in 1993, the woman in Mysteriesin 1994 and the role of Odette/Odile in Swan Lake in 1996.

She retired as a solo dancer at the age of 41 in 1997, and became both a character dancer and educator from that year on. Ryom made the request to retire and did instructional tasks inside and outside the Royal Theatre. In late 1999, she hosted the ballet Giselle, and worked for the Royal Theatre as a ballet instructor until 2007. Ryom was made Knight of the Order of the Dannebrog in 1988 and was promoted to Knight First Class of the Order of the Dannebrog eight years later. She appeared on the DR P1 radio programme Radiofortællinger to discuss the negatives of her career as a solo dancer. Ryom received the Tagea Brandt Rejselegat in 1990. In late 2013, she was awarded the Ballettens Venners Hæderspris from Princess Benedikte of Denmark.

== Personal life ==
She was in a relationship with the film worker Ulrik Wivel from 1986 to 1992. Ryom was married to the ballet dancer Julian Ringdahl from 1995 to 1999. She was the mother of one child. On the afternoon of 5 October 2013, Ryom died of a sudden brain haemorrhage.

== Analysis ==
Debra Craine and Judith Mackrell described Ryom in The Oxford Dictionary of Dance as "a soubrette, with her petite build and speed, she matured into a poetically expressive performer". Alette Scavenius said in Ryom's Dansk kvindebiografisk leksikon entry that the dancer's career had no drama in it "and has largely followed the beaten path. This calm development from ballet child over the youthfully cheerful soubrette to the tragedy roles in Russian bravura style was due in equal parts to willpower, stubbornness and the right people's understanding of HR's talent at the right time."
