= Lis Smed =

Danish actress

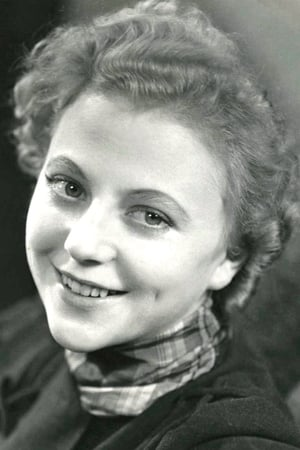
- Born: Elly Elisa Sørensen Smed; 27 November 1914; Horsens, Denmark
- Died: 24 November 1944 (aged 29); Frederiksberg, Denmark
- Occupation: Actress
- Years active: 1934–1944
- Parent(s): Jørgen Sørensen Smed, Johanne Pouline Hansen

Elly Elisa Sørensen Smed (27 November 1914 – 24 November 1944) was a Danish film and stage actress. At 19, she made her debut in Den lille Butik at Det Ny Teater in Copenhagen. Among her most successful films were Thummelumsen (1941) and Biskoppen (1944). As a result of trying to reduce weight, she died of eating disorders when she was only 30, a month after she had performed to full houses at Folketeatret in William Saroyan's Livet er jo dejligt.

== Early life ==
Born on 27 November 1914 in Horsens, Elly Elisa Smed Sørensen was the daughter of the electricity works manager Jørgen Sørensen Smed and his wife Johanne Pouline née Hansen. When she was 17 she moved to Copenhagen where she received basic training in ballet and in acting under Viggo Friederichsen (1875–1940) but she was above all naturally talented as an actress.

== Career ==
When she was 19 she made a sensational debut in August 1934 at Copenhagen's Det Ny Teater in the Viennese comedy Den lille Butik together with Erling Schroeder and Ib Schønberg. Her success was instantaneous. After the play, the audience assembled outside the theatre shouting "Vi vil se Lis" (We want to see Lis). In 1937, she underwent training at the Royal Danish Theatre but thereafter performed only in a series of private theatres where she continued her success. From the mid-1930s, she acted mainly in films but it was not until the 1940s that she reached her peak, starring in Thummelumsen (1941) and Biskoppen (1944).

In 1943–44, she appeared for a year and a half at the Riddersalen Theatre as Kitty in Soroyan's Livet er jo dejligt but as her health deteriorated many performances had to be cancelled. The problem was that she had been putting on weight and was trying to slim, frequently refusing to eat anything at all. This led to increasingly serious disorders, making it impossible for her to act.

Aged 29, Lis Smed died in the early hours of 24 November 1944 in Frederiksberg Hospital, only a month after she had last appeared on stage. Large crowds gathered for her funeral, hoping for a last glimpse of her coffin. She was buried in Frederiksberg Ældre Kirkegård.
