= Gudrun Boysen =

Danish physician (born 1939)

Gudrun Margrethe Boysen (b. 5 April 1939 in Lille Utterslev, Denmark) is a Danish physician (MD and DM.Sc.) and conducts research into the causes and effects of strokes. She conducts her research at the Department of Neurology, Bispebjerg Hospital, Copenhagen. In 1994, Boysen won a Tagea Brandt Rejselegat. She is married to Troels Johan Dahler Kardel and has two children, Maria (1972) and Sakina (1974).

== Selected publications ==
- Cerebral Hemodynamics in Carotid Surgery (Munksgaard, 1973)
- On the Critical Lower Level of Cerebral Blood Flow in Man with particular reference to Carotid surgery (Circulation, 49, 1023)
- Early Stroke: A Dynamic Process (Stroke, 32, 2423)
- Homocysteine and Risk of Recurrent Stroke (Stroke, 34, 1258)
- Persisting Dilemma: To Treat or Not to Treat Blood Pressure in Acute Ischemic Stroke (Stroke, 35, 526)
