= Bonna Søndberg =

Danish operatic soprano and singing educator (born 1933)

- Born: 17 August 1933 (age 93); Gørding, Ribe County, Denmark
- Occupations: Operatic soprano Educator
- Years active: 1955–1987
- Children: 3
- Awards: Knight of the Order of the Dannebrog; Tagea Brandt Rejselegat

Bonna Søndberg (born 17 August 1933) is a Danish former operatic soprano and singing educator. She first sang mezzo and made her on-stage debut as the housekeeper Marcellina in The Marriage of Figaro in 1955. Søndberg was employed by the Royal Danish Theatre one year later and she remained with the institution until her retirement in 1987. She is a Knight of the Order of the Dannebrog and a recipient of the Tagea Brandt Rejselegat.

== Early life ==
Søndberg was born in Gørding, Ribe County on 17 August 1933. She is the daughter of the tailor and tenor Jørgen Jensen and the pianist Sonja S. Hansen. At the age of four Søndberg began playing the piano but her heart always desired to sing. She moved to Rødding when she was six years old, and was raised in the Southern Jutland town. Søndberg was taught English, piano and singing under a singing educator and later left school to do housework. Following a year's worth of studying, she accepted to study in Copenhagen and also worked at an insurance company to fund her education. Søndberg was trained under, and her skill was developed enough to allow her to be admitted to The Opera Academy in 1954, at her second attempt.

== Career ==
In 1955, Søndberg had her debut role on stage singing mezzo as the housekeeper Marcellina in The Marriage of Figaro by Wolfgang Amadeus Mozart. She was employed at the Royal Danish Theatre the following year. Søndberg's breakthrough role came in Un ballo in maschera by Giuseppe Verdi, singing the role of Amelia in which she performed to the bass baritone Ib Hansen on stage in 1957. She was kept busy with other roles such as Ariadne in Richard Strauss' Ariadne auf Naxos, Elizabeth in Tannhäuser by Richard Wagner, Dido in Henry Purcell's Dido and Aeneas, Iphigenia in Iphigénie en Tauride by Christoph Willibald Gluck, Leonora in Verdi's The Troubadour and Alice Ford in Falstaff.

She received offers to sing on stage in foreign cities such as Bayreuth, London and New York but she rejected each and every one of them in that period of time. In 1959, Søndberg performed a number of songs in the collection Das Marienleben with the German composer Paul Hindemith and the Royal Danish Opera. She sung the part of the Governess in the horror opera The Turn of the Screw by Benjamin Britten in 1968. Søndberg was one of the first to perform music of Rued Langgaard, the late Romantic composer from the mid-1960s. She was cited as having begun a renaissance of the otherwise unknown Langgaard and she did concerts of Langgaard's music in countries such as Germany, Iceland, Norway and Sweden. Søndberg's final theatrical roles included Magdelone in Maskarade by Carl Nielsen and as Leokadja Begbick in Kurt Weill's Rise and Fall of the City of Mahagonny. In 1987, she retired from professional singing and began to focus on working as a singing educator, training and mentoring multiple actors and singers.

== Personal life ==
Søndberg has three children and has been married twice. Her first marriage to the typographer Flemming Søndberg lasted from 29 September 1953 to their divorce in 1957. Søndberg has been married to the editor Sten Uldal Rasmussen since 8 September 1979.

== Legacy ==
In 1956, she received the Kaj Munk's Memorial Scholarship. Søndberg was appointed Knight of the Order of the Dannebrog in 1968 and the Tagea Brandt Rejselegat the following year. The Danish Radio Archive contains a number of live radio and television recordings of her singing in their collections. The Rødding Local History Archive has a number of newspapers about or authored by Søndberg from 1960 to 1980 in its collection.
