= Tove Clemmensen =

Danish art historian

- Born: October 11, 1915; Copenhagen, Denmark
- Died: March 28, 2006 (aged 90)
- Occupation: Art historian

Tove Thejll Clemmensen (11 October 1915 – 28 March 2006) was a Danish art historian and curator who was a specialist in eighteenth-century Danish furniture. She renovated several Danish museums including Bakkehuset and Liselund in the 1950s.

== Biography ==
Born on 11 October 1915 in Copenhagen, she was the daughter of the architect and archaeologist Mogens Becker Clemmensen (1885-1943) and the artist Augusta Thejll (1884-1980). Her brother Ebbe (1917–2003) became a successful architect. In 1946, she married the university teacher Mogens Bellmann Mackeprang who died in 1986.

Clemmensen was raised in a comfortable artistic environment which influenced her own development. After matriculating from Rysensteen Gymnasium, she joined the National Museum of Denmark in 1935 where her father was planning the extension of the Prince's Mansion. She developed her expertise in the area by travelling in Europe. In 1937 she went to London to deepen her knowledge of medieval embroidery at the Victoria and Albert Museum. In 1939, she was appointed assistant curator at the Dansk Folkemuseum, becoming curator from 1953 to 1975.

Clemmensen's special interest in 16th and 17th century Danish furniture was inspired by her father's registration work. In 1940, she undertook a large-scale survey of furniture in Danish castles and manor houses, publishing the results of her restoration of Borreby Castle in 1942. With the assistance of the furniture expert Christian Axel Jensen (1878–1952), she recorded the castle's inventory. She went on to develop wider coverage of historic Danish furniture, pioneering a central archive at the National Museum with photographs of the pieces recorded. In particular, she developed an interest in the major Danish furniture designers of the 18th century. The work formed the basis of her 1973 doctoral thesis at Aarhus University, Møbler af N.H. Jardin, C.F. Harsdorff og J.C. Lillie og eksempler på deres interiørdekoration (Furniture by N.H. Jardin, C.F. Harsdorff and J.C. Lillie and Examples of their Interior Decoration Work).

She published several other works on Danish furniture and craftsmanship including Danish Furniture of the Eighteenth Century (1948) and The Recording of Furniture in Danish Castles and Manor Houses (1966). She has also studied and published works on historic Chinese furniture.

Tove Clemmensen died on 28 March 2006 and is buried in Gentofte Cemetery.

== Awards ==
Clemmensen was awarded the Tagea Brandts Rejselegat in 1974 and in 1975 was honoured as a Knight of the Order of the Dannebrog.
