= Eva Steiness =

Danish physician and business executive

Eva Steiness née Uhl (born 1941) is a Danish physician, former university professor and businessperson who has been active in Scandinavia's pharmaceutical industry since the late 1990s. She is currently CEO of Serodus ASA, a biomedical company based in Oslo which develops drugs for the treatment of diabetes. In 1982, Steiness became the first women to be appointed dean of Copenhagen University's faculty of medicine and in 1985, she became the first women in Denmark to become a full professor in the medical field with her appointment at Aarhus University.

== Early life and education ==
Eva Uhl was born in Glostrup on 4 October 1941. She is the daughter of the physician Erik Axelssøn Uhl (1908–82) and Grethe Holmer. She was raised in a well-to-do household in Copenhagen where she was the eldest of three children. After matriculating from Østersøgades Gymnasium in 1960, she immediately began to study medicine at Copenhagen University.

After marrying the medical doctor Ib Steiness (1928–80) in 1966, she moved with him to Aarhus, where she continued her studies at Aarhus University while raising her two daughters. She graduated in 1968. After which she moved back to Copenhagen, where she had her third daughter.

== Career ==
Following assignments in various hospitals, Steiness returned to her academic interests, teaching at Copenhagen University's pharmacological institute. In 1978, she earned a doctor's degree in medicine with a doctoral thesis titled Digoxin-klinisk farmakologi. After her husband's death in 1980, she raised her children alone, working as a physician in parallel with her academic agenda. In 1982, she was appointed dean of the Faculty of Medicine, the first woman to hold the post. With her appointment as professor of clinical pharmacology at Aarhus University in 1985, she became Denmark's first woman to hold a professorship in the medical field. She built up the institute, encouraging interest in research.

In 1989, she was appointed research director of the pharmaceutical company H. Lundbeck in Copenhagen. She remained there for the next nine years, becoming director and executive vice president. Under her leadership, the company grew considerably from 75 to 450 employees. In particular, the company prospered with sales of the antidepressant drug Cipramil. In 1998, after raising capital, she founded Zealand Pharma, with a focus on hormone preparations, serving as principal and board member. She also founded and owns the Danish company New Pharma. In April 2009, she joined Serodus, Oslo, as chief executive officer. Steiness also serves on the boards of several other companies in the medical field.

== Awards ==
- 1989, Tagea Brandt Rejselegat
