= Edel Saunte =

Danish judge (1904–1991)

Personal details
- Born: Edel Margareta Enrica Els Høst Saunte; 13 March 1904 Næstved
- Died: 22 November 1991 (aged 87) Helsingør
- Resting place: Frederiksberg Ældre Kirkegård
- Party: Social Democrats (Denmark)

Edel Saunte (13 March 1904 in Næstved – 22 November 1991 in Helsingør) was a Danish jurist, social democratic politician and women's rights activist.

Saunte received her law degree from the University of Copenhagen in 1925. In 1934 she became a barrister of the High Court (landsretssagfører), the third woman to do so.

In summer 1944 during the German occupation she participated in the organization of the food distribution in Copenhagen.

Saunte was an unsuccessful candidate for the Social Democrats in the first election after World War II, held on 31 October 1945. The following day the resistance newspaper Information described her as competent and blamed her failed candidacy on the undemocratic election procedure within her party. Saunte was interviewed, but declined to comment on the social democratic election procedure.

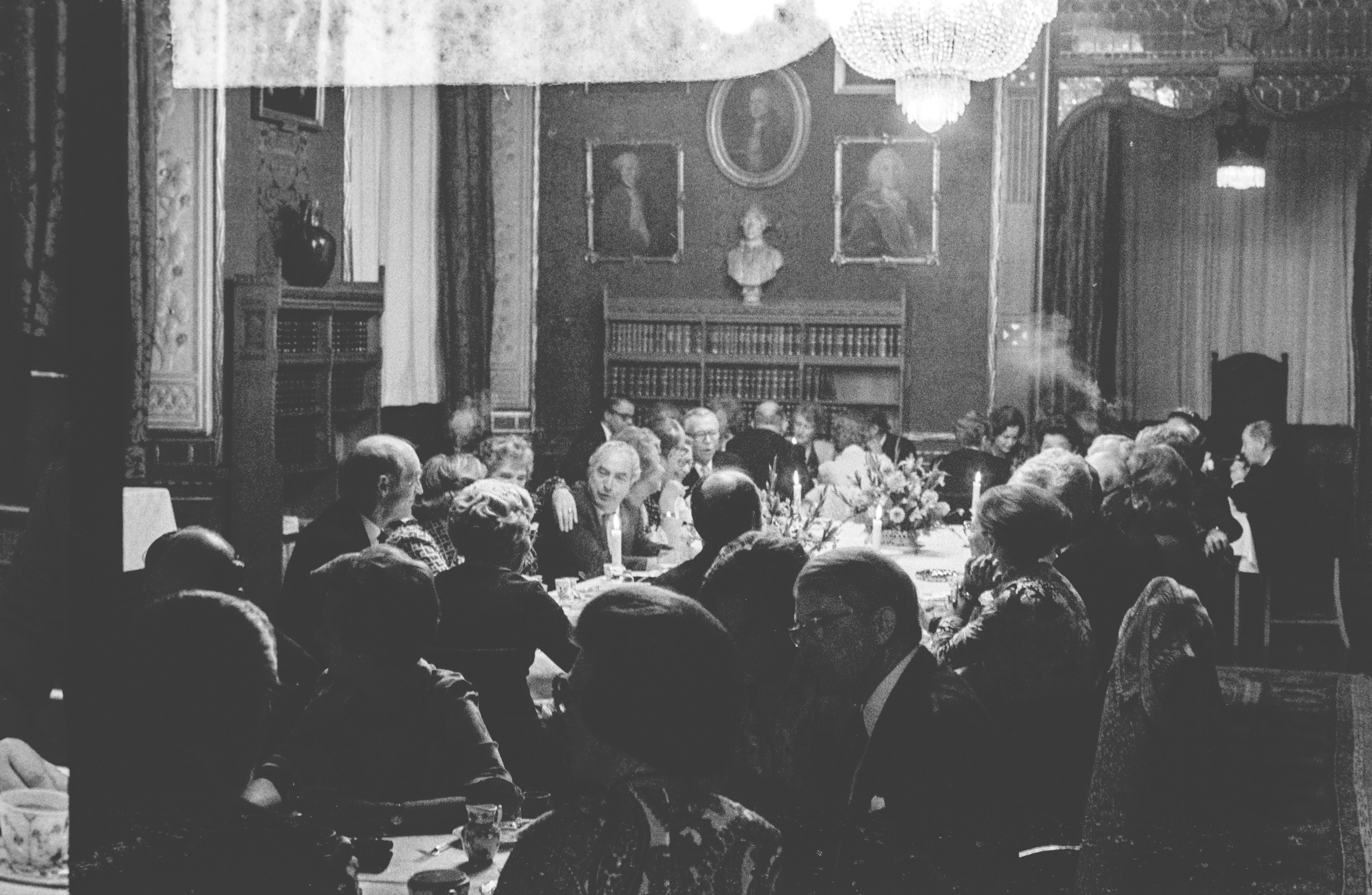
7 September 1974: Saunte's farewel dinner at Copenhagen City Hall.

In 1947 she was elected for Folketinget where she remained a member until 1962 at which point she became a mayor of Copenhagen, she first woman to do so.

The street Edel Sauntes Allé in Fælledparken is named after her.
