= Dorte Juul Jensen =

Danish scientist

Dorte Juul Jensen (born 1957) is a senior scientist and head of the Center for Fundamental Research: Metal Structures in Four Dimensions and Materials Research Division, Risø DTU National Laboratory for Sustainable Energy, Roskilde, Denmark. Risø operates under the auspices of the Danish Ministry of Science, Technology and Innovation, researching a wide range of technologies and training Ph.D. candidates in the sciences.

Jensen's research involves advancing knowledge of the physical characteristics of metal structures. She has pioneered new experimental techniques based on neutron diffraction, electron microscopy, and synchrotron x-ray diffraction.

== Career ==
After earning her Ph.d. in Civil Engineering, she was appointed chair of the Research Forum by the then minister of Research.

Since 1983 Juul-Jensen has been a researcher at Risø National Laboratory, first as a scientist, then from 1994 as a senior scientist.

Juul-Jensen is also an editor of the journal Scripta Materialia, an international journal of material science. She co-authored a book, Electron Backscatter Diffraction in Materials Science, which was published by Kluwer Academic in 2000.

=== Publications ===
Dorte Juul Jensen has published over 450 scientific articles. These include:

- An experimentally-based molecular dynamics analysis of grain boundary migration during recrystallization in aluminum
- Development of microstructure in FCC metals during cold work
- Impact of 3D/4D methods on the understanding of recrystallization

=== Awards and achievements ===
- In 1997, Juul-Jensen became the first woman to be awarded the degree of Dr. Techn. in Denmark.
- In 1998, she was awarded a Tagea Brandt Rejselegat.
- In 1999, she was the first woman to receive the Statoil Prize (Danish: Statoil Prisen) for her work.
- In 2016, she received the CS Smith Award for the ground-breaking results she achieved using 3D techniques.
- In 2022, she received and ERC PoC grant to further develop the instrument to look into the internal structures of the metals in four dimensions
- In 2022, she also received the Villum Kann Rasmussen Annual Award in Science and Technology for her research into the internal microstructures and properties of metals.

== Personal life ==
Dorte Juul Jensen was born 30 January 1957 in Birkerød, Denmark to Per and Jutta (Hartvig) Justesen. She married Jens Christian Juul-Jensen, 29 August 1981. They have two children.
