= Lilian Weber Hansen =

Danish operatic mezzo-soprano (1911-1987)

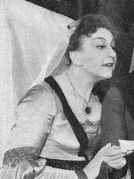
- Lilian Weber Hansen in Falstaff 1958
- Born: Lilian Oda Theodora Weber Hansen; 27 January 1911; Copenhagen, Denmark
- Died: 20 November 1987 (aged 76); Gentofte, Denmark
- Occupation: Actress
- Years active: 1940 — 1979
- Spouse: Severin John Frans Ahlqvist
- Parent(s): Georg Richard Hansen, Marry Vilhelmine Augusta Jensen

Lilian Oda Theodora Weber Hansen (1911–1987) was a Danish operatic mezzo-soprano who from 1940 sang at the Royal Danish Theatre for 25 years. She is remembered above all for her talents as a dramatic actress, especially towards the end of her stage career when she was able to give full weight to roles of elderly women. She was admired as Gluck's Orpheus, Verdi's Eboli in Don Carlos and Wagner's Ortud in Lohengrin. In a lighter vein, she was repeatedly successful as Lille Forglemmigej in Den gode fregat Pinafore.

== Biography ==
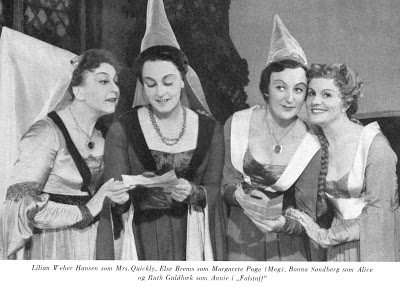
Lilian Weber Hansen (left) with Else Brems, Bonna Sandberg and Ruth Guldbænk in Falstaff 1958

Born on 27 January 1911 in Copenhagen, Lilian Weber Hansen was the daughter of Georg Richard Hansen (1880–1966) and Marry Vilhelmine Augusta née Jensen (1884–1964). In 1942, she married the French horn player Severin John Frans Ahlqvist (1907–1967). She received voice training from the Danish opera singer Valdemar Linke before entering the Royal Opera School. She later studied in Italy under the operatic soprano Maria Labia.

In 1940, she made her début at the Royal Danish Theatre with a small paort in Ebbe Hamerik's Marie Grubbe. With her powerful mezzo voice, she was selected to sing Gluck's Orpheus but it was not until 1948 that she achieved real success as Eboli in Verdi's Don Carlos when she was able to display her dramatic talents to great effect. As a result of her tuition under Labia, she went on to earn admiration for her interpretation of Amneris in Aïda. However, there were indications she should refrain from forcing the higher notes. Other major parts included the title role in Carmen, Ortrud in Lohengrin and Azucena in Il trovatore.

From the early 1950s she was increasingly cast in comic parts such as Lady Billows in Benjamin Britten's Albert Herring and Zita in Puccini's Gianni Schicchi. She particularly enjoyed playing Little Buttercup in Gilbert and Sullivan's H.M.S. Pinafore. In her later years, she was acclaimed for playing the roles of elderly women and nannies, including those in Eugene Onegin and Boris Godunov.

Lilian Weber Hansen died in Gentofte on 20 November 1987.

== Awards ==
In 1950, Weber Hansen was honoured by King Frederik IX as a Royal Chamber Singer and in 1956 as a Knight of the Order of the Dannebrog. She received the award reserved for successful women, the Tagea Brandt Rejselegat in 1959.
