= Hans Christian Gram =

Danish bacteriologist (1853–1938)

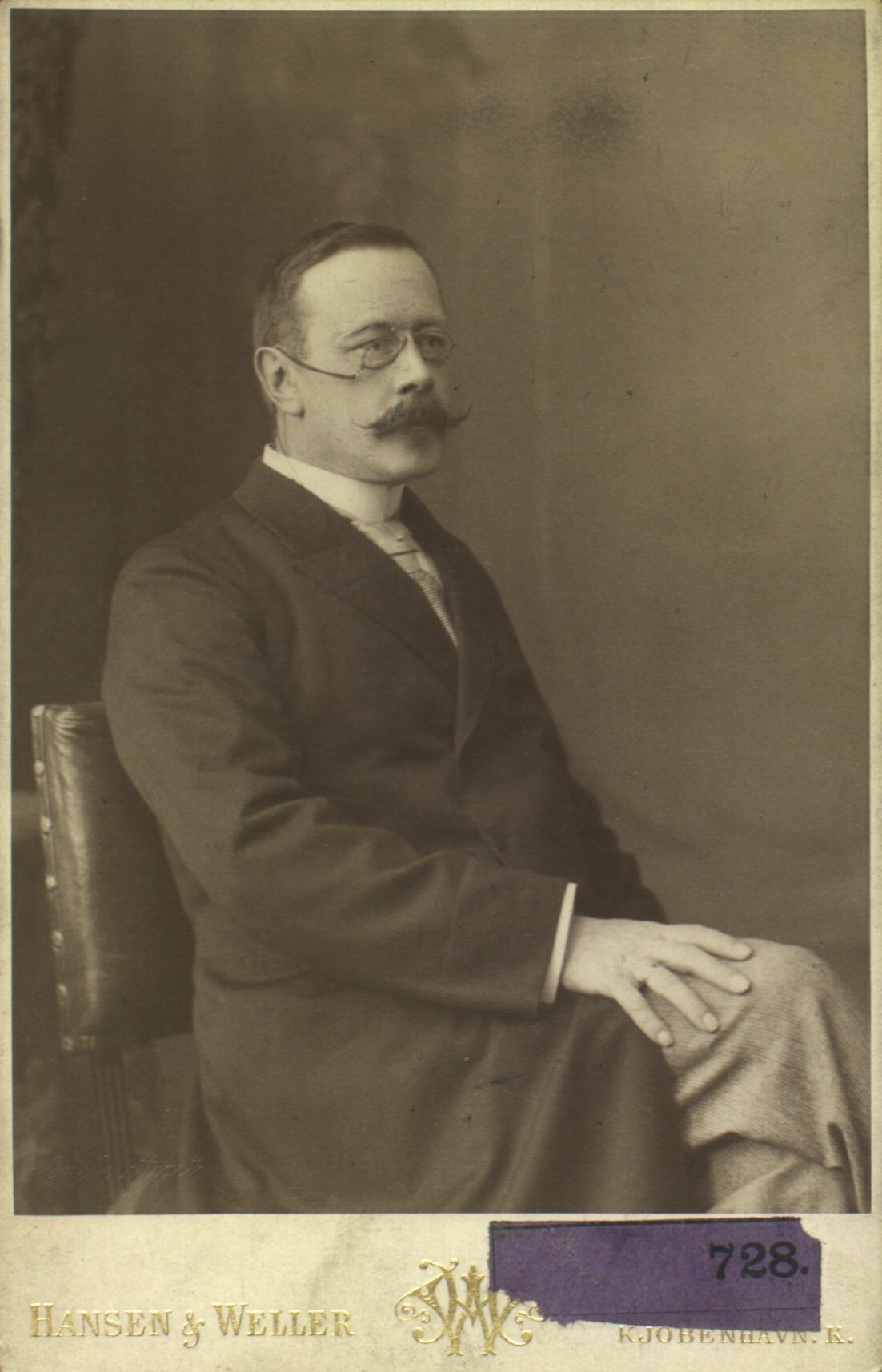
- Hans Christian Gram by Hansen & Weller
- Born: Hans Christian Joachim Gram; 13 September 1853; Copenhagen, Denmark
- Died: 14 November 1938 (aged 85); Copenhagen, Denmark
- Known for: Inventing the Gram stain
- Scientific career
- Fields: Bacteriology
- Doctoral advisor: Japetus Steenstrup

Hans Christian Joachim Gram (13 September 1853 – 14 November 1938) was a Danish bacteriologist who developed the Gram stain, still a standard technique to classify bacteria and visualize them under a microscope.

== Early life and education ==
Gram was the son of Frederik Terkel Julius Gram, a professor of jurisprudence, and Louise Christiane Roulund.

He studied at the University of Copenhagen, and was an assistant for botany to the zoologist Japetus Steenstrup. His study of plants introduced him to the basics of pharmacology and the use of the microscope.

Gram began medical school in 1878 and graduated in 1883. He traveled throughout Europe between 1878 and 1885.

== Career ==
=== Gram stain ===
In Berlin, in 1884, Gram developed a method for distinguishing between two major classes of bacteria. This technique, known as Gram staining, continues to be a standard procedure of medical microbiology. This work gained Gram an international reputation. The staining method later played a major role in classifying bacteria. Gram was a modest man, and in his initial publication he remarked, "I have therefore published the method, although I am aware that as yet it is very defective and imperfect; but it is hoped that also in the hands of other investigators it will turn out to be useful."

A Gram stain is made using a primary stain of crystal violet and a counterstain of safranin. Bacteria that turn purple when stained are termed 'Gram-positive', while those that turn red when counterstained are termed 'Gram-negative'.

=== Other work ===
Gram's initial work concerned the study of human red blood cells. He was among the first to recognise that macrocytes were characteristic of pernicious anaemia.

During 1891, Gram taught pharmacology, and later that year was appointed professor at the University of Copenhagen. In 1900, he resigned his professorship of pharmacology to become professor of medicine. As a professor, he published four volumes of clinical lectures which became used widely in Denmark. He retired from the University of Copenhagen in 1923, and died in 1938.

== Popular recognition ==
On 13 September 2019, Google commemorated the anniversary of his birth with a Doodle for Canada, Peru, Argentina, Australia, New Zealand, Israel, India and some European countries.

== Personal life ==
Gram's great-granddaughter Lone Gram is a microbiologist who works at the Technical University of Denmark.
