= Tagea Brandt =

Ductch activist and politician (1847–1882)

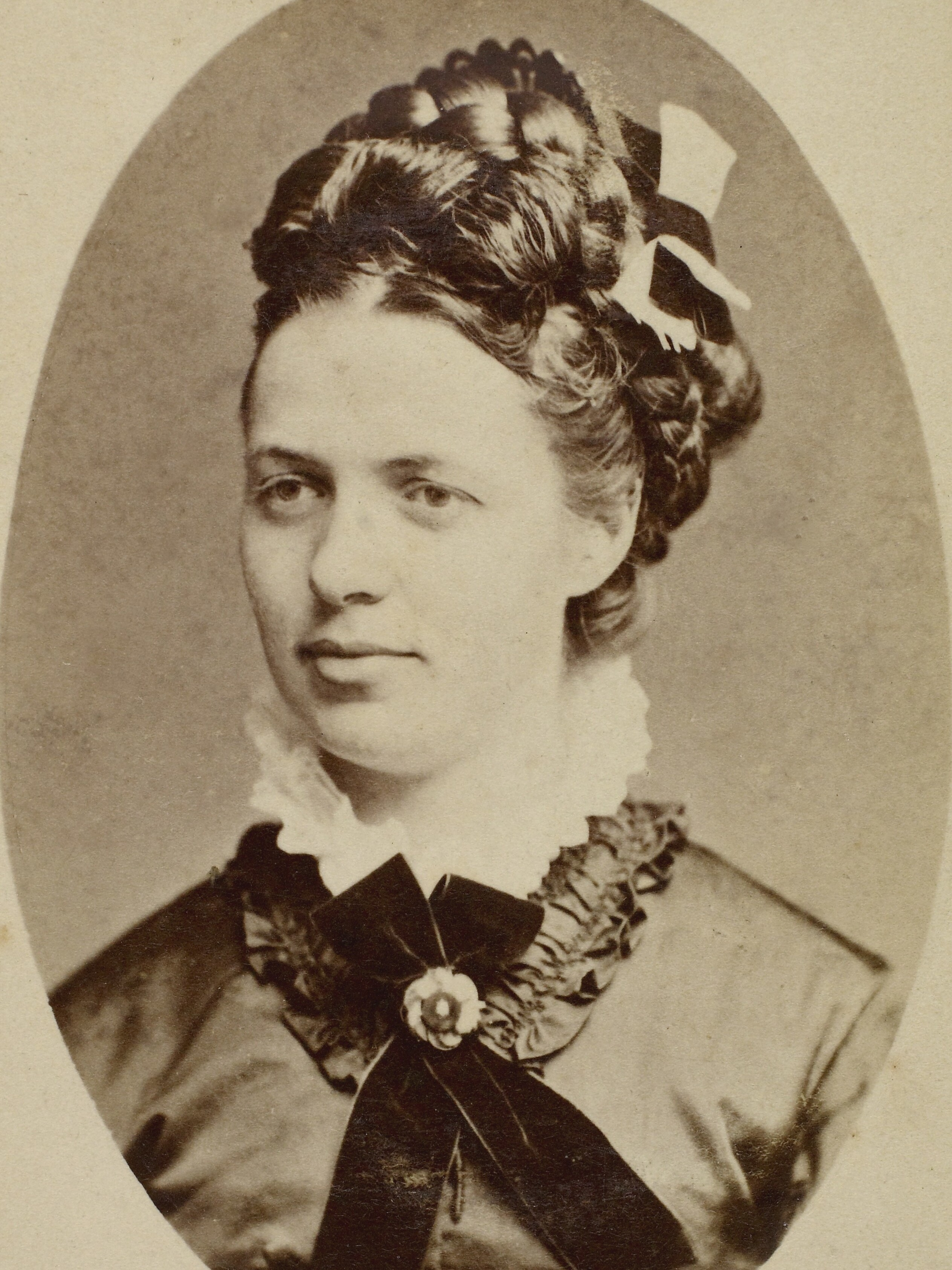
Tagea Brandt

Tagea Brandt née Rovsing (1847–1882), was a Danish woman. The Tagea Brandt Rejselegat is named in her honor.

== Biography ==
Brandt was born Tagea Rovsing in Copenhagen on 17 March, 1847. She was born to the educator, principal and politician Kristen Rovsing (1812–1889) and the feminist and women's right activist Marie Rovsing (1814–1888).

She was educated at the progressive girls' school Døtreskolen af 1791, and was able to study the French language in Paris in 1861.

Her mother belonged to the pioneer generation of the Danish women's movement of first wave feminism, and was one of the first members of the Dansk Kvindesamfund (DK) when it was founded in 1871. Tagea and her sister Esther was introduced by their mother to Kvindelig Læseforening ('Women's Reading Club'). She was a board member and secretary of Kvindelig Læseforening from 1877 until 1880. She was known for her clear head and optimism.

In 1880, she resigned her assignments within the women's movement in order to enter a love marriage with a man she had known for ten years. In 1881 she married Danish industrialist Vilhelm Brand. She died in Odense in 1882, one year after her marriage, in an illness of the blood. Her sudden death inspired her widower to create an award to her honor.

== Scholarship ==
The Tagea Brandt Rejselegat (Travel Scholarship) is a Danish award given annually on 17 March to women who have made a significant contribution in science, literature or art. It was created and endowed by her husband, Vilhelm Brandt, in 1905.

== See also ==
- Women in Denmark
