= Ida Ørskov =

Danish bacteriologist (1922–2007)

- Frits Ørskov (left) with Ida Ørskov (right) c. 1958
- Born: Ida Oppenheuser; 8 January 1922; Copenhagen, Denmark
- Died: 10 April 2007 (aged 85)
- Spouse: Frits Ørskov (m. 1948)
- Children: 2
- Awards: Paul Ehrlich Prize; Tagea Brandt Rejselegat

Academic background
- Thesis: 'Om Klebsiella'

Academic work
- Main interests: Bacteriologist

Ida Ørskov (née Oppenheuser; 8 January 1922 – 10 April 2007) was a Danish physician and bacteriologist whose dissertation Om Klebsiella (About Klebsiella) was the first scientific study pointing to the risk of bacterial cross-infection in hospitals.

== Biography ==
Born in Copenhagen, Ørskov was the daughter of Johannes Georg Oppenheuser, an engraver, and Helga Christensen. After matriculating from N. Zahle's School in 1941, she began to study medicine the encouragement of her chemistry teacher. Her friendship and later marriage (1948) with her fellow student Frits Ørskov, the son of the director of the Danish Serum Institute (Statens Serum Institut), raised her interest in bacteriology and led to close collaboration with her husband after he became head of the institute's coli department. After graduating from the University of Copenhagen in 1948, she became an assistant at the institute's International Salmonella Centre.

Her thesis Om Klebsiella (1956) was one of the first scientific papers addressing the presence of bacterial cross-infection. Together with her husband, she investigated the virulence factors and related properties of coliforms. The work led to the establishment of a coli department which became the World Health Organization's International Escherichia Centre, leading to a national Salmonella Centre and an international Klebsiella Centre. In 1968, she was appointed overlæge (head of department). This resulted in close contacts with the American National Institutes of Health in the late 1970s and early 1980s, including a year with her husband as visiting scientists at the NIH.

Ida Ørskov died on 10 April 2007 and is buried in Frederiksberg Ældre Kirkegård Cemetery. Her husband, Frits Ørskov, died on 29 July 2015.

== Awards ==
- 1965: Paul Ehrlich Prize
- 1978: Tagea Brandt Travel Scholarship

== Selected publications ==
Ida Ørskov contributed to some 200 publications, most in collaboration with her husband and other scientists. Works include:

- Ørskov, Ida (1956). Om Klebsiella: en oversigt (in Danish). Busck.
- Ørskov, Frits; Ørskov, Ida (September 1975). "Escherichia Coli O:H Serotypes Isolated From Human Blood". Acta Pathologica et Microbiologica Scandinavica. 83B (6): 595.
