= Tutter Givskov =

Danish violinist and music professor (1930–2023)

Tutter Ellen Margrethe Givskov (30 April 1930 – 15 February 2023) was a Danish violinist and music professor. After serving as leader of the Tivoli Symphony Orchestra from 1951, in 1954 she joined the Royal Danish Orchestra. Together with other musicians from the orchestra, in 1957 she created the Copenhagen String Quartet (Københavns Strygekvartet) until it ceased playing in 1994. In 1969, she left the orchestra to turn to teaching. In the early 1970s, she joined Det Jyske Musikkonservatorium where she became Denmark's first female professor of music in 1988.

== Early life and education ==
Born in Copenhagen on 30 April 1930, Tutter Ellen Margrethe Givskov was the daughter of the inspector Frederik Givskov (1897–1984) and Ellen Caroline Blumensen (1906–1962). She started to play the violin when she was six, becoming the leader of her school orchestra and then of the junior ensemble of the Danmark Radio's Symphony Orchestra under Emil Reesen. She entered the Royal Danish Academy of Music when she was 14, studying the violin under Thorvald Nielsen and Erling Bloch, graduating in 1947. She also studied the piano, allowing her later to accompany her students. She then spent two winter seasons in London, studying further under Henry Holst.

== Career ==
In 1951, she became the leader of the Tivoli Symphony Orchestra, often playing popular violin concertos. She joined the Royal Symphony Orchestra in 1954, becoming the first woman to serve on the orchestra's board in 1957–58. In 1957, she established the Copenhagen String Quartet, one of the leading quartets of the times. It consisted of musicians from the Royal Orchestra, including Givskov as first violin, Mogens Lüdolph, second violin, Mogens Bruun, viola, and Asger Lund Christiansen, cellist. They built up a repertoire of 122 quartets which they were able to play at short notice, often performing abroad. Givskov became so active in the quartet that she left the Royal Orchestra in 1969. In 1971, she began to teach at Jyske Musikkonservatorium, becoming the first woman to be appointed full professor of music in 1988. She retired in 1999.

== Death ==
Givskov died on 15 February 2023, at the age of 92.

== Awards ==
Givskov received a number of scholarships, including the Tagea Brandt Rejselegat in 1962. In 1981, she was honoured as a Knight of the Dannebrog.
