= Karl Mantzius =

Danish actor (1860–1921)

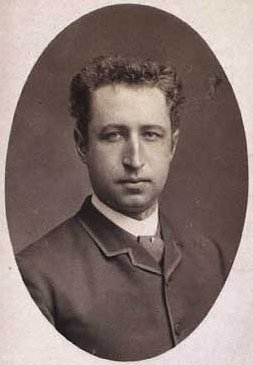
- Portrait of Mantzius by Hansen & Weller
- Born: 20 February 1860; Copenhagen, Denmark
- Died: 17 May 1921 (aged 61); Frederiksberg, Denmark
- Occupations: actor; stage and film director; opera singer

Karl Mantzius (20 February 1860 – 17 May 1921) was a Danish actor, stage and film director, theatre scholar, and operatic baritone.

== Life and career ==
Mantzius was born in Copenhagen, the son of the actor Kristian Mantzius. At first he played small roles in amateur comedy plays at the Court Theatre in Copenhagen, including 'Vielgeschrey' in Den Stundesløse by Ludvig Holberg, which brought him so much success that the theatre manager Edvard Fallesen advised him to become an actor.

He made his debut at the Royal Danish Theatre on 1 September 1883 as Jerome in Erasmus Montanus and became a regular presence at the theatre as both an actor and director. His later roles included Dr. Stern in En mand gik ned fra Jerusalem, Lieutenant von Buddinge in Jens Christian Hostrup's Gjenboerne and Falstaff in Henry IV. Although primarily a stage actor, he also appeared in two operas at the Royal Danish Theatre—as Beckmesser in Wagner's Die Meistersinger von Nürnberg and as Jeronimus in the 1906 world premiere of Carl Nielsen's Maskarade. His last performance at the Royal Theatre was as Uncle Peter in Det gamle Hjem on 28 April 1921, less than a month before his death in Frederiksberg at the age of 61. Like his father, he was buried at the Frederiksberg Ældre Kirkegård.

In 1904, Mantzius founded the Danish Actors' Association.

== Filmography ==
Pavillonens Hemmelighed (1916)

Mantzius became a director at Nordisk Film in 1914 and directed three films for the company:

- Penge (1914)
- Pavillonens hemmelighed (1916)
- Addys ægteskab (1916)

He also appeared as an actor in the 1919 Swedish film Hans nåds testamente (His Lordship's Last Will) in the role of His Lordship.
