= Elna Borch =

Danish sculptor

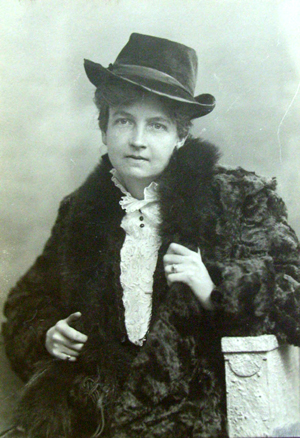
Elna Borch

Elna Inger Cathrine Borch (6 December 1869 – 3 October 1950) was a Danish sculptor. Although her known work is considered high quality by art dealers, Borch is today largely forgotten and little known to the general public.

== Biography ==
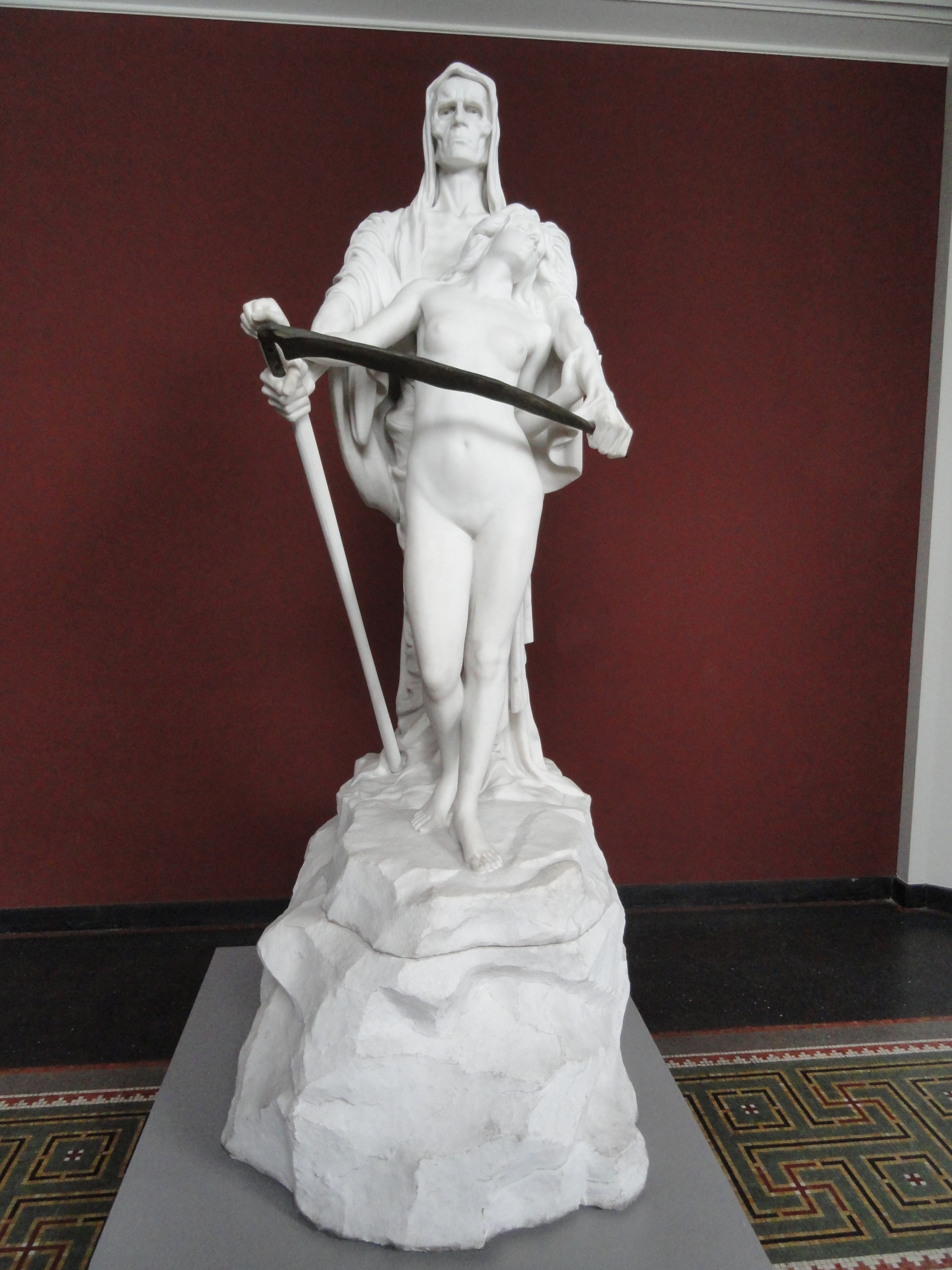
Elna Borch's sculpture, Death and the Maiden (1905)

Borch was born in Roskilde, Denmark. She was the daughter of merchant Anders Jacob Borch (1834–1904) and Martha Petrine Willumsen (1845–1922). She came from a family full of artists, including her uncle Jacob Kornerup (1825–1913), who taught her how to draw. She later learned sculpture in Copenhagen from sculptor August Saabye, who became her instructor when she was at the Academy of Fine Arts for Women (Kunstakademiets Kunstskole for Kvinde).

She debuted at the Charlottenborg Spring Exhibition in 1891 and continued to exhibit there for several years. She gained the opportunity to study abroad and moved to Paris in 1900 and later to Italy. Her sculptural style references naturalism and symbolism. In Paris in 1901, she sculpted the bust Laughing Faun, and in 1902, she visited northern Italy, where she made the figure Sorrowful Boy which later received the Neuhausen Prize.

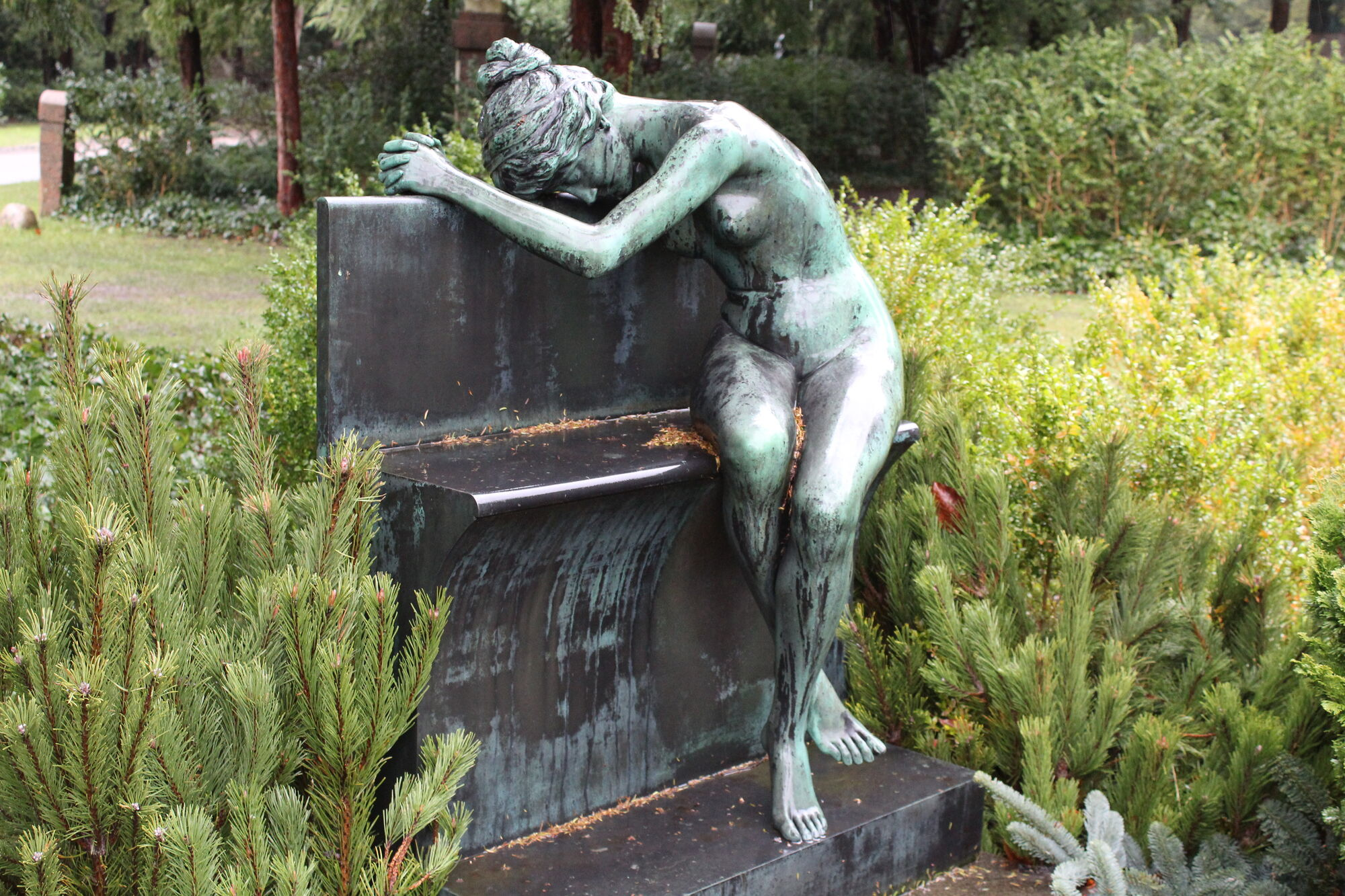
Grave monument by Elna Borch at Copenhagen's Western Cemetery.

Borch took interest in symbolism and became one of the few Danish sculptors in this form of expression. In 1905, she made a major breakthrough with Death and the Maiden with clear stylistic references to international symbolism. She was the first female sculptor represented in Ny Carlsberg Glyptotek, where her most famous sculpture Death and the Maiden resides.

Abroad, her work was presented in 1927, at the Danish National Exhibition in Brooklyn, New York. She was involved in the cause of animal rights. In 1936, she received the travel scholarship Tagea Brandts Rejselegat, a Danish award for women who have made significant contributions in the fields of science, literature or art.
