= Edith Guillaume =

Danish operatic mezzosoprano

- Born: June 14, 1943 (age 82); Denmark
- Occupation: Mezzo-soprano

Edith Sussanne Antonie Guillaume (June 14, 1943 - September 11, 2013) was a Danish mezzo-soprano who sang for the Danish National Opera and the Royal Danish Opera. She is remembered for performing in several modernist works, including those of Krzysztof Penderecki, Per Nørgård and Ib Nørholm.

== Early life and education ==
Born on 14 June 1943 in Bergerac, France, Edith Sussanne Antoine Guillaume was the daughter of the French architect Hubert Guillaume and his Danish wife, Marie Worm. After her father's death in 1944, her mother married the engineer Julius Wærum who travelled widely. As a result, Guillaume spent her early childhood in France, Peru and Sweden, becoming fluent in several languages. In 1955, the family moved to Denmark where she attended the Lycée Français. When she was 18, she entered the Royal Danish Academy of Music, studying under the tenor Thyge Thygesen.

In June 1966, she married the horticulturalist and tree specialist Niels Edgar Hvass.

== Career ==
Impressed by her performance at her debut concert, the composer Ib Nørholm offered her a part in his recently composed Syv tavler til Orfeus. The work, which toured Europe, created considerable attention. As a result. Guillaume was engaged by the Danish National Opera (Den Jyske Opera) where in 1970 she took the title role in Lars Johan Werle's Drömmen om Thérèse (Dreaming about Thérèse). It was to be the beginning of a long career with the company where she performed in both classical and modernist works, including the lead in Antonio Bibalo's chamber opera Frøken Julie (Miss Julie).

In 1974, she was engaged by the Royal Opera where she performed as lead mezzo-soprano in a wide variety of works, including Così fan tutte, Tancred, Der Rosenkavalier, The Devils of Loudun, Orpheus and Eurydice, Dido and Aeneas and Carmen.

Edith Guillaume died on 11 September 2013 and is buried in Gentofte Cemetery.

== Awards ==
Among Guillaume's many awards include the Tagea Brandt Rejselegat (1977) and her distinction as a Knight of the Order of the Dannebrog (1985).
