= Grethe Krogh =

Danish concert organist and professor (1928–2018)

- Born: 7 November 1928; Viborg, Denmark
- Died: 5 April 2018 (aged 89); Denmark
- Education: Viborg Katedralskole
- Alma mater: Royal Danish Academy of Music
- Occupation: Organist
- Years active: 1953–2000s
- Spouse: Richard Dahl Erikse (m. 1969; died 1998)
- Awards: Knight First Class of the Order of the Dannebrog; Chevalier of the Ordre des Arts et des Lettres; Tagea Brandt Rejselegat

Grethe Krogh (7 November 1928 – 5 April 2018) was a Danish concert organist and professor. She began playing at age five and was educated at the Royal Danish Academy of Music. Krogh's concert debut playing the piano and organ came in 1953 and she began working as an organist firstly at Nykøbing Mors from 1954 to 1957 and then at Holmen Church from 1964 to 1969. She was appointed professor of organ playing at the Royal Danish Academy of Music in 1969 and worked there until 1990 when she became a freelance solo organist. Krogh received various awards and scholarships throughout the course of her career. She received the Tagea Brandt Rejselegat in 1972 and was appointed Knight of the Order of the Dannebrog in 1974 before being promoted to Knight First Class in 1982. Krogh was decorated with France's Chevalier of the Ordre des Arts et des Lettres in 2006.

== Biography ==
On 7 November 1928, Krogh was born in Viborg, Denmark. She was the daughter of the pianist Svend Krogh Christensen, and his wife Agnes Hornskov, who was also a musician. Krogh began playing the piano when she was five years old and took up piano lessons at Viborg Katedralskole. She came to know the organist Bodil Helsted and she was Helsted's substitute at the Søndre Sogns Kordegnekonto. In 1947, Krogh graduated from Viborg Cathedral School, and enrolled at the Royal Danish Academy of Music the following year. She obtained degrees by passing the examinations in piano, organ and harpsichord in 1951.

Krogh made her concert debut playing the organ and the piano in 1953, both of which came two weeks apart. Starting in 1954 and ending in 1957, she began working as an organist in Nykøbing Mors, where she performed the works of Svend-Ove Møller, Louis-Nicolas Clérambault and François Couperin. Between 1955 and 1956, Krogh studied organ under André Marchal and piano under Antoine Reboulot in Paris on a scholarship from the French state.

She was appointed to work as a teaching assistant in organ at the University of Arkansas in the United States for a year from 1958 to 1959. Krogh also studied American music and gave concerts performing Danish music. From 1960 to 1964, she worked as the organist at the Christianskirken in Aarhus and she was the first in the place to perform La Nativité du Seigneur by Olivier Messiaen. Krogh joined the Holmen Church as its organist in 1964 and remained there until 1969. She was the first woman organist to hold such a role in one of Central Copenhagen's churches and she performed at the wedding of the Danish heir apparent Margrethe II in 1967. Krogh was the first to perform the works of both Olivier Messiaen and Jehan Alain in Denmark.

In 1965, Krogh began teaching the organ part-time at the Royal Danish Academy of Music and was appointed professor in this subject in 1969. She educated such students as Inge Bønnerup, Jens E. Christensen and Flemming Dreisig from Denmark as well as young students from foreign countries such as the United States, and across Europe. Krogh recorded a number of Danish music on gramophone and CD records on various record labels, and she premiered the new works of Niels la Cour, Bernhard Christensen, Knud Høgenhaven, Tore Bjørn Larsen, Møller, Carl Nielsen and Leif Thybo.

She retired from the academy in 1990 to enable her to focus on working as a freelance solo organist. Krogh was on the jury of various international juries, and she toured extensively in Canada, Europe, Japan, the former Soviet Union and the United States. From 1961 to 1964, she was a member on the board of both the Danish Organist and Office Society and the Association of Civil Servants in Denmark, was on the board of Danish section of the International Heinrich Schutz Society from 1966. Krogh was on the Committee for Danish Church Singing, and was a committee member for the Samfundet Dansk Kirkesang between 1984 and 1987.

== Personal life ==
Krogh was married to the viola player Richard Dahl Erikse from 7 May 1969 to his death on 4 October 1988. She died on 5 April 2018.

== Awards ==
Over the course of her career, Krogh earned a number of awards and scholarships. She earned the Music Critics' Artist Award for 1968, the Tagea Brandt Rejselegat in 1972, and the Ove Christensen's Memorial Scholarship in 1978. In 1974, Krogh was appointed Knight of the Order of the Dannebrog and was promoted to Knight First Class of the Order of the Dannebrog eight years later. She received the Carl Nielsen and Anne Marie-Carl Nielsen Prize of honour in 1999 and the Prize of Honour of the Carl Nielsen Society in Denmark in 2005. In 2006, Krogh was decorated with the French Chevalier of the Ordre des Arts et des Lettres.
