= Brigitte Kolerus =

Danish actress and theatre director (1941–2001)

- Born: Brigitte Käthe Kolerus; 13 May 1941; Vienna, Austria
- Died: 19 June 2001 (aged 60); Copenhagen, Denmark
- Occupations: Ballet, actress
- Years active: 1963 — 1994
- Spouse(s): Michael Lindvad (divorced), Svend Aaage Christensen
- Children: 1
- Parent(s): Franz Kolerus, Gertrud Kail

Brigitte Käthe Kolerus (1941–2001) was an Austrian-born Danish actress who performed in films and on television but mainly on stage. After studying at the Odense Teater drama school, she appeared in the musical Man of La Mancha at Ungdommens Teater in 1967 and went on to play Desdemona in Shakespeare's Othello at Det Danske Teater in 1969. She made a name for herself in films by appearing in erotic scenes in Erik Frohn Nielsen's Ekko af et skud in 1970. Kolerus also served as director of Copenhagen's Teatret ved Sorte Hest from 1978 and staged plays and operas at a number of venues.

== Early life, education and family ==
Born in Vienna, Austria, on 13 May 1941, Brigitte Kolerus was the daughter of the journalist Franz Kolerus and his wife Gertrud née Kail, an academic. Together with her younger brother, the family emigrated to Denmark in 1953 where Kolerus matriculated from the Esbjerg high school in 1959. She went on to take a trilingual correspondence course at the Copenhagen Business School which she completed in 1961. She subsequently decided to become an actress and studied under Tove Bang from 1963 to 1966 at the Odense Teater drama school. Kolerus married twice, first with the actor Michael Lindvad with whom she had a son, Augustin (1972). The marriage was dissolved in 1987. In May 1991, she married the historian Svend Aaage Christensen.

== Career ==
On completing her drama studies, in 1967 Kolerus took the leading female role in a youth production of the musical The Man from La Mancha. In 1969, she toured with Det Danske Teater playing Desdemona in Shakespeare's Othello. In the early 1970s she appeared at Aalborg Teater and at Copenhagen's Gladsaxe Teater. Kolerus successfully played the leading role in the film Ekko af et skud (1970) where she attracted attention appearing naked in erotic scenes. The same year, she also made an erotic appearance in Kaspar Rostrup's TV play Natlig møde i København, gaining a reputation in the press as "Denmark's most erotic woman".

Kolerus is remembered above all for her contributions to the theatre. In 1978, she established the small 70-seat Teatret ved Sorte Hest which she ran until 1994. In addition to her own roles such as the Green-clad Women in Ibsen's Per Gynt and as the opera singer Maria Callas in Kaptajn Shell, kaptajn Esso, she staged plays, including August Strindberg's comedy Playing with Fire at Det Ny Teater and directed P.O. Enquist's Tupilak. She also produced reviews at Café Teatret and worked as an opera director for Den Anden Opera in Copenhagen.

Brigitte Kolerus died on 19 June 2001, aged 60, and is buried in Frederiksberg Cemetery.
