= Herdis Møllehave =

Danish social worker and writer

Herdis Møllehave née Poulsen (1936–2001) was a Danish social worker and writer. In addition to several professional works, in 1977 she published a semi-autobiographical novel, Le, followed by Lene and Helene. All three sold well in Denmark and Germany.

== Biography ==
Born on 26 August 1936 in Flensburg, a German town in Southern Jutland, Herdis Poulsen was the daughter of Erna G. and Jørgen Damkjær Poulsen, both Danish schoolteachers. When she was 12, she moved to Denmark. In 1958, she married the Danish Lutheran priest and writer Johannes Møllehave.

After being employed as a social worker, she worked for a number of years at a teacher-training college in Vanløse. After the success of her novel Le both in Denmark and Germany with sales of some 500,000, she devoted all her time to writing and lecturing. Not intended to be a literary masterpiece, Le brings out many problems typically experienced by women: relationships with different men, feelings, depression, fear, identity, and bringing up children. It proved particularly popular with women readers.

Thanks to the success of her novels, she began to write non-fiction works about topics of interest to women but which at the time were never discussed. For her discussion of menopause, following the advice of a colleague, she avoided using the word in the book's title, calling it instead: En bog uden navn - om det man ikke taler om (A Book without a Name - about what you never talk about). It was published in 1985.

She and her husband, who have three children together, spent many years in Virum before moving to Brussels and then to England. Herdis Møllehave died in Hove near Brighton on 8 June 2001.
