= Anna Borg =

Danish-Icelandic actress and autobiographer (1903–1963)

- Born: Anna Guðmundína Guðrún Borgþórsdóttir; 30 July 1903; Reykjavík, Iceland
- Died: 14 April 1963 (aged 59); Nesøya, Akershus, Norway
- Occupation: Actress
- Years active: 1912–1963
- Spouse: Poul Reumert (m. 1932)
- Children: 2
- Relatives: Stefanía Guðmundsdóttir (mother)
- Awards: Ingenio et arti Tagea Brandt Rejselegat; Läkerol's Culture Award; Teaterkatten

Anna Guðmundína Guðrún Borg (née Borgþórsdóttir; 30 July 1903 – 14 April 1963) was a Danish-Icelandic actress of stage and screen and autobiographer. The daughter of the Icelandic actress Stefanía Guðmundsdóttir, she grew up in a household where theatre was part of her daily life and began acting at age nine. Borg joined the Royal Danish Theatre in 1928, portraying strong and pure female characters, and also performed in the Dagmar Theatre and the National Theatre of Iceland. She and 11 other people were killed in an aeroplane accident near Oslo in April 1963 and her memoirs were published posthumously the following year. Borg was a recipient of the Ingenio et arti theatre award, the Tagea Brandt Rejselegat, the Läkerol's Culture Award and the Teaterkatten.

== Early life and education ==
Borg was born on 30 July 1903 in Reykjavík, Iceland, the fourth child of the actress Stefanía Guðmundsdóttir and the barrister Borgthór Jósefsson. As was the case with many children of actors in Iðnó, she was raised in a household where the theatre was part of her day-to-day life. Because Borg could not receive an education in theatre in Reykjavík, she was sent to Copenhagen to study at the Det Kongelige Teaters elevskole at the request of the theatre director Adam Poulsen and was educated by the actor Poul Reumert. She initially struggled with speaking Danish but was offered further schooling because of her talent. Borg graduated from the theatre in 1928, becoming one of the first Icelanders to do so.

== Career ==
She portrayed strong and pure female characters, and joined the Royal Danish Theatre in 1928. She made her on-stage debut as Tóta lila in Eyvind of the Hills at the age of nine and became a participant in her mother's play tours to the West Coast of the United States and Canada from 1920 to 1921. On 22 March 1929, Borg made her major debut as the lead role of Maria in Finnish-Swedish poet Runar Schildt's Galgemanden, a two-person one-act play. She went on to portray Margarete in Johann Wolfgang von Goethe's Goethe's Faust two years later. That same year, Borg played Anne Boleyn in Kaj Munk's Cant. She also portrayed Agnete in Johan Ludvig Heiberg's Elves' Hill and was featured in some plays by Adam Oehlenschläger such as Valborg in Axel and Valborg in 1929 and Gudrun in Laxdæla saga.

Borg and her family resided at a summer house Kandestederne or in Reykjavik from 1932. Between 1934 and 1936, she was employed at the Dagmar Theatre and then at the Royal Danish Theatre from 1938 after a single role in Munk's Sejren. In 1940, Borg played Indra's daughter in August Strindberg's A Dream Play. Five years later, she had the role of the doctor-parent Martha Ellekær in the feature film Affæren Birte and was Irene in De kloge og vi gale. Borg went on do character acting, being cast in the role of Klytemnestra in Jean-Paul Sartre's The Flies in 1946, portrayed Regina Hubbard Giddens in Lillian Hellman's The Little Foxes a year later and Laura in Strindberg's The Father in 1950.

While doing a guest performance in the National Theatre of Iceland in Reykjavík in 1951, she became seriously ill with gallstones, a serious metabolic disease, and did not return to theatre work until 1954. Borg's appearance had been affected by her illness. Her first on-stage role following her recovery from ill health was as Queen Elizabeth I in Friedrich Schiller's Mary Stuart in 1954. During this period of her life, Borg became a drama teacher for the opera staff at a school. In 1957, she had a role in Giuseppe Verdi's Un ballo in maschera; Hans Christian Branner's Thermopylæ in 1958; Elsker-elsker ikke at Aalborg Teater in 1960; Queen Bera in Oehlenschläger's Hagbard and Signe in 1961; and Verdi's Rigoletto in 1962.

She was an honorary member of the Danish Nurses' Organization and was on the board of the Copenhagen Acting Personnel's Private Fund.

== Personal life and death ==
Borg married Reumert in Reykjavik on 5 August 1932 and they had two children; she was Reumert's third wife. Borg and 11 other people were killed in an aeroplane accident on a hilltop in Nesøya, Akershus, Norway, west of Oslo while en route to Reykjavík on the morning of 14 April 1963. Her memoirs, Anna Borgs erindringer, were published posthumously in 1964. Proceeds from book sales were distributed to the Mrs. Stefania Guðmundsdóttir Memorial Fund, which helped establish its first grant in 1970.

== Awards ==
In 1941, Borg received the Ingenio et arti theatre award. She was named a winner of the Tagea Brandt Rejselegat seven years later and the Läkerol's Culture Award in 1955. Borg was a recipient of the Teaterkatten in 1958.
