= Asger Lund Christiansen =

Danish cellist (1927–1998)

Asger Lund Christiansen (1927–1998) was a Danish cellist and composer.

He trained at the Royal Danish Academy of Music, graduating in 1946. Alongside Bløndal Erling Bengtsson, he was his generation's most recognized Danish cellist. In 1957–1995 he played with musicians such as Tutter Givskov, Mogens Ludolph and Mogens Bruun in the Copenhagen String Quartet and also as a soloist, teacher and organizer, he has had a major influence. From 1965–1987, he was a teacher and later professor at the Royal Danish Academy of Music.

Asger Lund Christiansen wrote a significant number of compositions. He has written chamber music, instrumental music and orchestral works in a mostly neo-classical style. One of his flute sonatas was premiered by Jean-Pierre Rampal. His son is the flautist and composer Toke Lund Christiansen.
