= Tina Kiberg =

Danish operatic soprano (born 1958)

Tina Sarsøe Kiberg (born 30 December 1958) is a Danish operatic soprano who has gained international success, thanks in particular for her leading roles in the operas of Richard Strauss and Richard Wagner. In addition to performances at the Royal Theatre in Copenhagen, she has sung in Bayreuth and at the Metropolitan Opera in New York City.

== Biography ==
Born in 1958 in the Frederiksberg district of Copenhagen, Tina Sarsøe was the daughter of the opera singer Claus Lembek (1929–2010) and the singing pedagogue Birgit Sarsøe. On 11 February 1990, she married the opera singer Stig Fogh Andersen (born 1950).

She was brought up in Birkerød together with her mother and her husband, Erling Kiberg, and her three half sisters. She did not meet her biological father until her early 20s. From 1975, she attended the Royal Danish Conservatoire where she took singing lessons in parallel with her high school education in Birkerød Gymnasium where she matriculated in 1977.

From 1981 to 1985, she continued her training at the Royal Theatre's Opera Academy. While there, she made her début in 1983 as Leonora in Carl Nielsen's Maskarade. The following year she was placed second and won a gold medal at the Benson and Hedges international voice competition in London. In 1988, as a guest in Geneva, she took the role of Agathe in Carl Maria von Weber's Der Freischütz. Her Wagnerian roles have included Else in Lohengrin which she has performed in Copenhagen, Vienna, Brussels, Zürich, Houston and a number of cities in Germany. In the 1990s, she played Elisabeth in Tannhäuser, Sieglinde in Die Walküre and Eva in Die Meistersinger. In 1995, she was the first female Danish opera singer to appear at New York's Metropolitan Opera when she sang Pamina in The Magic Flute.

In 2010, she was diagnosed with throat cancer. She thought it could put a stop to her singing career. After several months' treatment, she slowly began to recover but it was not until May 2012 that she returned to the stage appear in Parsifal. By 2014, she was appearing regularly at the Royal Theatre.

== Awards and honours ==
In 1993, Kiberg was awarded the Tagea Brandt Rejselegat. After being honoured as a Knight of the Dannebrog in 1993, she received the Knights First Class medal in 2001. In 2010, she was honoured with the prestigious Kongelige Kammersanger.
