= Kristian Mantzius =

Danish actor (1819–1879)

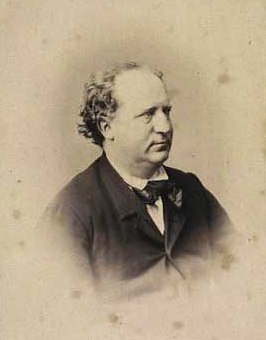
- Kristian Mantzius (1819-1879), Danish actor
- Born: Christian Andreas Leopold Mantzius; 4 November 1819; Viborg
- Died: 5 June 1879 (aged 59); Copenhagen
- Years active: 1842–1871

Kristian Andreas Leopold Mantzius (4 November 1819 – 5 June 1879) was a Danish actor.

== Early life and education ==
Kristian Mantzius was born in Viborg, son of Gen. Karl Johan Peter Mantzius (1791-1859) and Mette Marie, née Fogh (1792-1870). Mantzius was brother to Johanne Juliane Marie Henriette Mantzius (1822-1869) and Johan Frederik Mantzius (1834-1890), a school teacher.

Mantzius came to Copenhagen with his parents when he was around one year old. His parents were poor and had many children. He was therefore brought up in the home of Juliane Jhøllestrup, his father's maternal aunt, who was wealthy and had become a widow. She lived at Nytorv 117.

Mantzius graduated from the Metropolitan College in 1837 and went to the University of Copenhagen, where he began studying theology, subject which he continued with until 1842. On 27 September of that year, Mantzius debuted as 'Erasmus Montanus' at the Royal Danish Theatre. After his third performance he accepted an offer to work for 400 Thalers a month. But it was not until August 1848 that he was effectively hired as royal actor because of royal interference from Frederick VII of Denmark who had amused himself admirably in both the play and the actor. However, in 1858 he resigned and began working the two following seasons at the Folksteatret instead, where he helped his friend Jens Christian Hostrup stage his student comedy Gjenboerne before returning to the Royal Theater.

== Career ==
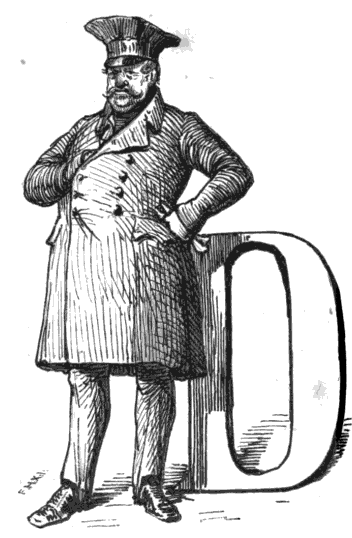
Kristian Mantzius, 1880

Mantzius never gave up and showed he was dissatisfied with the board of the Royal Theater all the time he was working there. He presumably retained his position only because of his great popularity with the audience. He was dismissed from his post as royal actor on 17 April 1871, without a pension, but returned to the Royal Theater as guest actor once the audience complained.

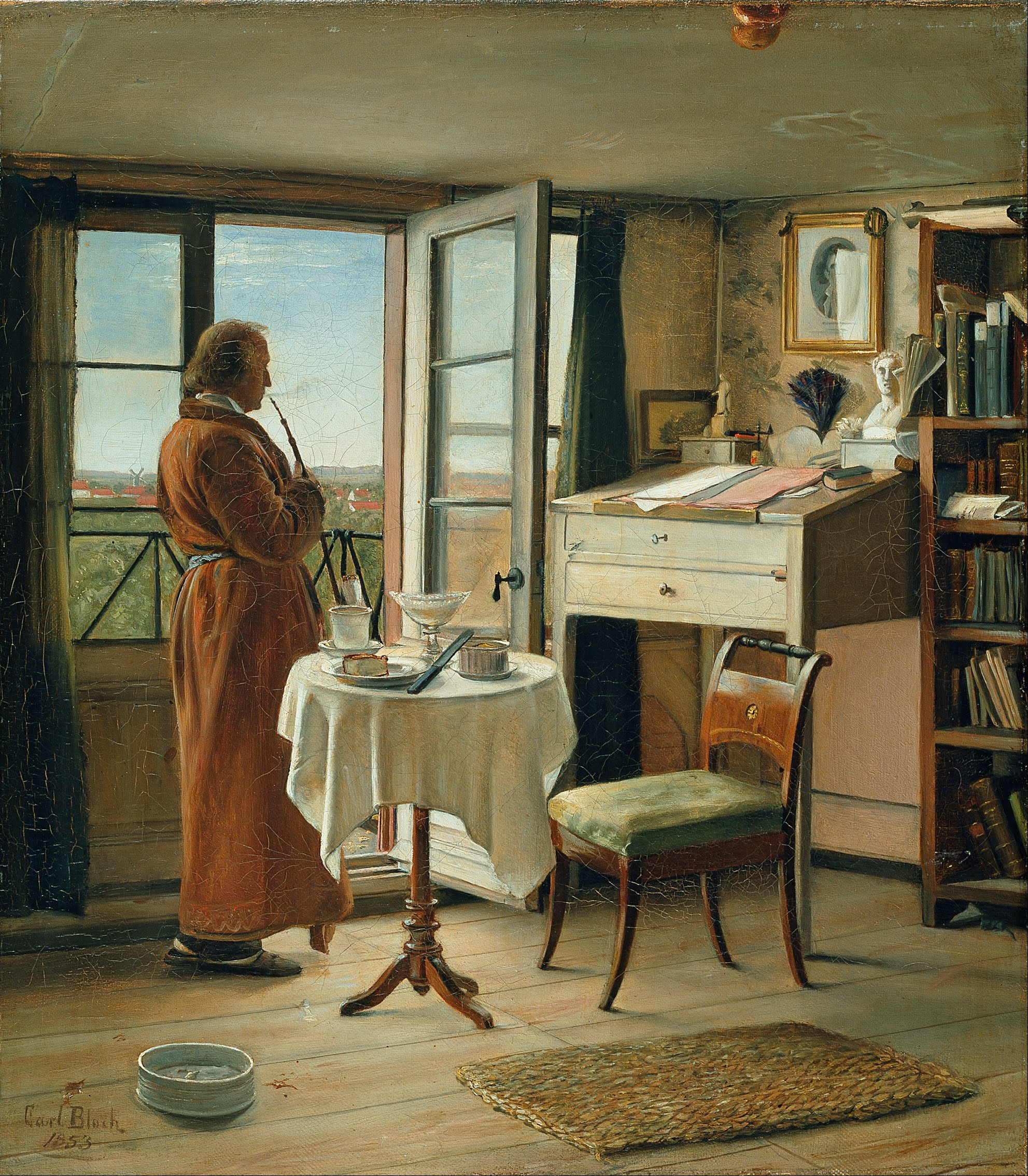
Carl Bloch: Kristian Mantzius in his study 1853

== Personal life ==
Mantzius married Anna Margrethe Petrea Jorgensen (b. Copenhagen on 10 December 1841) on 20 January 1859, with whom he had Karl Mantzius (1860-1921), actor and theater director. His niece was Juliane Blicher-Hansen (1849-1933), a school superintendent.

In the autumn of 1877 he became seriously ill, and after eighteen years of progressive infirmity he died of breast cancer on 5 June 1879. He is buried in the Garnisons Cemetery, in Copenhagen.

Mantziusvej in Hellerup was named after Kristian Mantzius in 1903.

== Selected roles ==
- Erasmus Montanus in Erasmus Montanus (Holberg) (1842) debut
- Arv in Jean de France (Holberg) (1842)
- Giulio Romano in Correggio (Oehlenschläger) (1843)
- Løjtnant v. Buddinge in Gjenboerne (Hostrup) (1843–44)
- Konsul Varbjerg in En Spurv i Tranedans (Hostrup)
- Jeronimus in Pernilles korte Frøkenstand (Holberg)
- Jacob Skomager in Jeppe på Bjerget (Holberg)
- Jesper Ridefoged in Erasmus Montanus (Holberg)
- Skalholt in Besøget i København (Hertz)
- Pastor Jensen in Deklarationen (Christian Richardt)
- Grønholt in Mester og Lærling (Hostrup)
- Daniel Hejre in De unges Forbund (Henrik Ibsen)
- Anker in Soldaterløjer (Hostrup)

== Literature ==
- Karl Mantzius, Min Far og jeg (1919)
