= Frederik Ferdinand Helsted =

Danish painter and drawing master

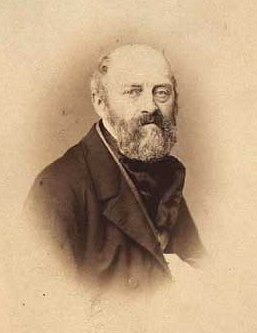
Frederik Ferdinand Helsted

Frederik Ferdinand Helsted (March 18, 1809 – December 11, 1875) was a Danish painter and drawing master.

== Biography ==
Helsted was born in Copenhagen, Denmark. He was the son of Johan Helsted and Ane Marie Salathee. From 1834 to 1837 he studied at the Royal Danish Academy of Fine Arts. He conducted study trips to Düsseldorf (1841), Nice, Florence and Rome (1844–45). In 1845 he set up a drawing school in Copenhagen which he ran for 30 years. After 1849, he abandoned his painting career and concentrated on drawing lessons.

In 1841, he married Anna Christiane Vilhelmine Olsen (1815–1889). He was the father of painter Axel Helsted (1847–1907). He was buried at the Holmens Cemetery in Copenhagen.

== Other sources ==
- Biography at the Dansk biografisk Lexikon (in Danish)
