= Sorella Englund =

Sorella Englund (born 23 December 1945 in Helsinki) is a former soloist and character dancer with the Royal Danish Ballet. She has been a keen supporter of August Bournonville, staging a number of his ballets in Denmark and abroad.

== Biography ==
The daughter of composer Einar Englund (1916–1999) and pianist Meri Gyllenbögel (1917-1956), Sorella Englund was born on 23 December 1945 in Helsinki, Finland. Already as an eight-year-old, she began training with the ballet school of the Finnish National Opera. She then studied with the Finnish National Ballet, joining the company in 1964. She moved to Denmark in 1966 when Flemming Flindt engaged her to dance in the Royal Danish Ballet where she studied Bournonville choreography under Hans Brenaa. Her breakthrough came in 1969 when she took the part of Hilda in Bournonville's A Folk Tale. Erik Aschengreen, writing in Berlingske Tidende commented: "She stood on the stage like a ray of light. Wonderfully poetic. At one and the same time both innocent and dangerously threatening."

She became a soloist in 1970 (a first for a foreigner) and, as a result of illness, a character dancer in 1993 before retiring as a dancer in 1994. She was ballet master with the Boston Ballet from 1996 to 1999. Her principal Bournonville roles have included Madge in La Sylphide, Teresina in Napoli, and Hilda in A Folk Tale. She has also danced in modern works including Paul Taylor's Aureole (1968) and Antony Tudor's Jardin aux Lilas. She has also participated in Eske Holm's ballets and happenings dancing Electra in his Orestes (1972) and taking the title role in his The Firebird (1975). With her exceptional radiance, Englund has been a challenge for contemporary choreographers. Roles have been created for her by Constantin Patsalas in Das Lied von der Erde (1988), Kenneth Kreutzmann in Lullaby (1996) and Tim Rushton in Carmina Burana (1997).

She produced Abdallah together with Flemming Ryberg and Bruce Marks for the Royal Danish Ballet (1986) and (as Arabian Nights) for the National Ballet of Canada (1988). In 1990, with Else Marianne von Rosen she staged Thrymskvinden at the Royal Danish Ballet. She produced La Sylphide for the Scottish Ballet (1996) and for the Tokyo National Ballet (2000). In 2009, together with Nikolaj Hübbe, she produced a new version of Napoli, now set in the Italy of the 1950s. The ballet was successfully received when performed in New York in 2011.

Sorella Englund is currently an instructor with the Royal Danish Ballet in Copenhagen.

== Awards ==
- Tagea Brandt Rejselegat (1978)
- Bournonville-Legatet (Bournonville Grant) (1989)
- Karen Marie Thorsens Teaterlegat (Karen Marie Thorsen's Theatre Grant) (1996).
