= Sofie Rostrup =

Danish entomologist (1857–1940)

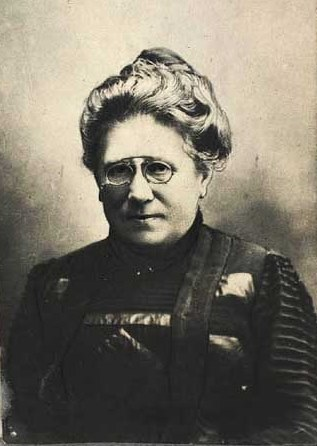
- Rostrup in 1927
- Born: 7 August 1857; Sønderholm, Denmark
- Died: 25 January 1940 (aged 82); Copenhagen, Denmark
- Occupations: Entomologist; Teacher

Sofie Rostrup (née Jacobsen) (7 August 1857 - 25 January 1940) was a Danish entomologist and teacher. She has been described as the founder of agricultural entomology in Denmark. She was the first Danish woman to gain a Magisterkonferens degree in natural history, and worked as a manager of the zoological department of the Danish Farmer's Association. She was an honorary member of both the Stockholm Entomological Association and the Copenhagen Entomological Society. She was awarded the gold Medal of Merit for her services to Danish agriculture when she retired in 1927.

== Career ==
Rostrup was born on 7 August 1857 in North Jutland. Her father was a parish minister, and her mother came from a well-regarded family that included the poet Steen Steensen Blicher. Rostrup learned Latin and Greek from her father, and then initially trained as a teacher, qualifying in 1879, before attending the University of Copenhagen in 1884. When she was awarded her Magisterkonferens in natural history, majoring in zoology, in 1889 she became the first Danish woman to graduate from this degree.

Rostrup has been described as the founder of agricultural entomology in Denmark. From 1896 she travelled the country to assess agricultural pest infestations and to recommend controls. This resulted in her influential 1900 treatise on the subject Vort Landbrugs Skadedyr blandt Insekter og andre lavere Dyr. From 1907 she worked with the Danish Farmer's Association on a series of agricultural experiments, and continued as an affiliated zoologist to this scheme when it was taken over by the state in 1913. In 1919 Rostrup was appointed manager of its zoological department.

The Stockholm Entomological Association made her an honorary member in 1927. The Copenhagen Entomological Society, which she had joined in 1906 and regularly contributed towards, awarded Rostrup an honorary membership on her 80th birthday in 1937. When she retired in 1927, she was awarded the gold Medal of Merit for her services to Danish agriculture.

=== Personal life ===
Rostrup married twice: first to zoologist Hans Jacob Hansen from 1883 to 1890, which ended in divorce, and latterly to the botanist Ove Georg Frederik Rostrup in 1892. Sofie and Ove had a single daughter, Ellen.

== Select publications ==
- Rostrup, S. 1896. Danske Zoocecidier
- Lind, J., Rostrup, S., Ravn, F. K. 1915. Oversigt over Landbrugsplanternes Sygdomme i 1915
- Rostrup, S. 1928. Vort landbrugs skadedyr.
