= Dyveke Helsted =

Art historian and museum custodian

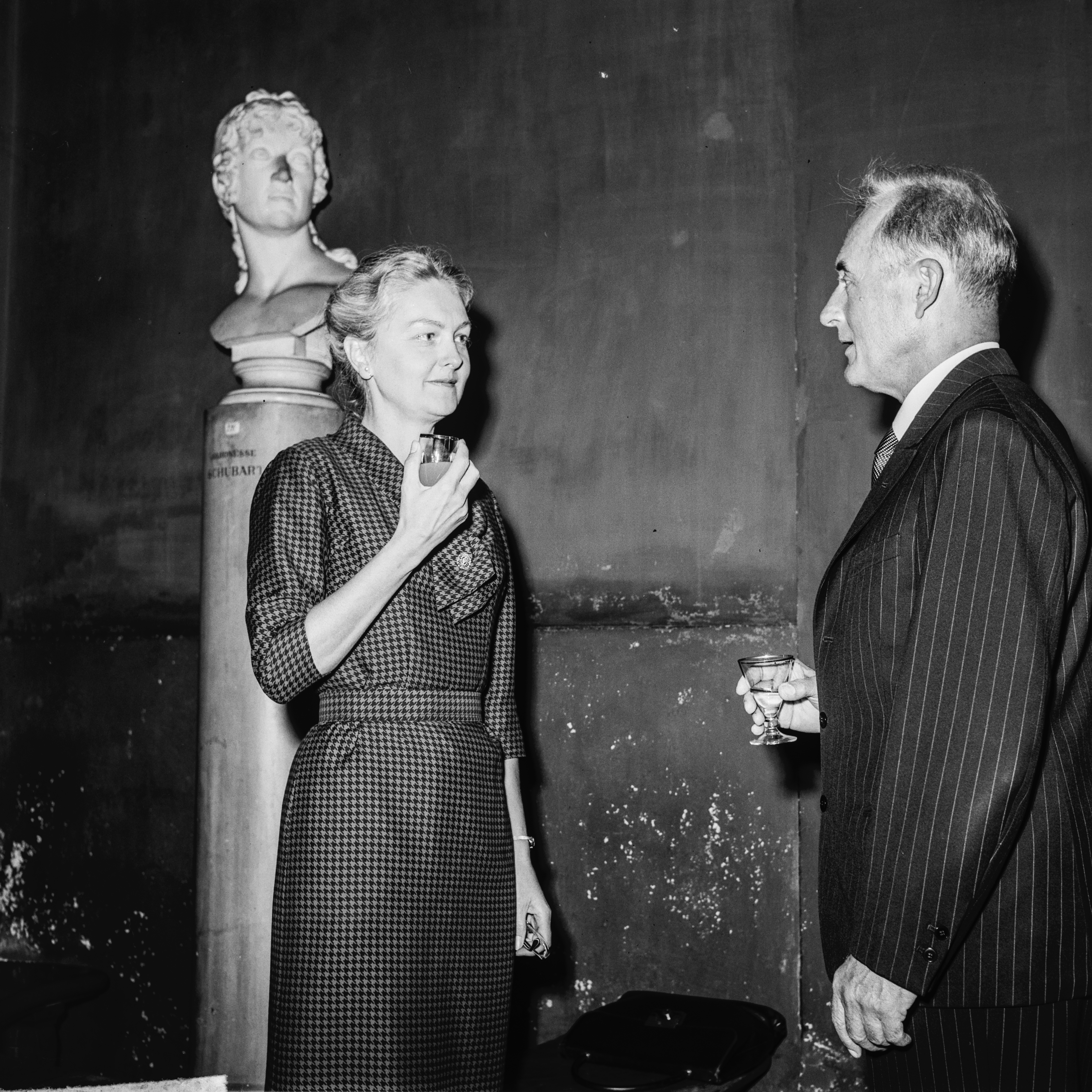
21 August 1063: Reception when Helsted succeeded Sigurd Schultz as director of Thorvaldsen's Museum.

Dyveke Helsted née Brun (1919–2005) was an art historian and museum custodian. In 1954, she joined Thorvaldsens Museum in Copenhagen where she was director from 1963 to 1989. Helsted is remembered for arranging many specialized exhibitions and contributing books, articles and catalogues in connection with the Danish sculptor Bertel Thorvaldsen. In 1990, her biography Thorvaldsen together with Eva Henschen and Bjarne Jørnæs was translated into English.

== Biography ==
Born on 30 January 1919 in Copenhagen, Dyveke Brun was the daughter of the physician Axel Brun (1870–1958) and Margrethe Krog (1884–1980). On matriculating from N. Zahle's School in 1939, she studied history of art at the University of Copenhagen, earning a master's degree in 1951. In 1945, she married the economist Gustav Helsted.

From 1951 to 1954, she divided her time between Denmark's historical photography collection and the Archive for Decorative Art in Lund. In 1954, she received a post in Thorvaldsen's Museum where she served as director from 1963 to 1989. In the early 1970s, she renovated the museum's basement in order in arrange a series of special exhibitions. Some were devoted to attracting more visitors to the museum while others covered developments in art and culture during Thorvaldsen's lifetime. Of particular note were the detailed catalogues she prepared in connection with each exhibition. The catalogues served as a model for other museums in Denmark.

Thanks to her communication skills, Helsted contributed significantly to the reputation of Thorvaldsen's Museum, writing articles not only for the museum's publications but also for journals at home and abroad. From 1966 to 1972, she chaired Danske Museers Fællesråd (Danish Museums Council) and in 1979 she served on the board of the Foreningen af Danske Kunstmuseer (Association of Danish Art Museums). In 1968, she was honoured as a knight of the Order of the Dannebrog and in 1978, as a knight first class.

Dyveke Helsted died on 5 January 2005.
