= Axel Helsted =

Danish painter

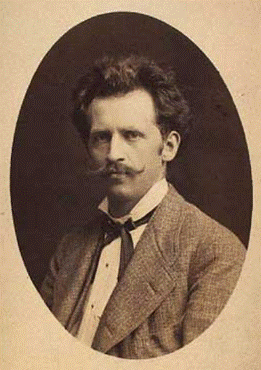
Axel Helsted

Axel Theophilus Helsted (11 April 1847 – 17 February 1907) was a Danish painter.

== Biography ==
Helsted was born in Copenhagen, Denmark. He was the son of the painter Frederik Ferdinand Helsted. He studied at the Royal Danish Academy of Fine Arts, completing his course of study in 1866. In 1869, he traveled to Paris. From 1874, he and his wife stayed in Italy. Helsted made a journey to the Netherlands and Belgium in 1890. In 1887, Helsted became a member of the Royal Academy, in 1892 he received the title of professor.

Helsted exhibited at the Charlottenborg Spring Exhibition between 1865 and 1907; he also had various exhibitions at Paris, Vienna and Munich. He painted the altarpiece of the Church of Christ in Copenhagen.

== Other sources ==
- Biography at the Dansk biografisk Lexikon (in Danish)
