= Assistens Cemetery (Copenhagen) =

Cemetery in Copenhagen, Denmark

Coordinates: 55°41′28″N 12°32′58″E

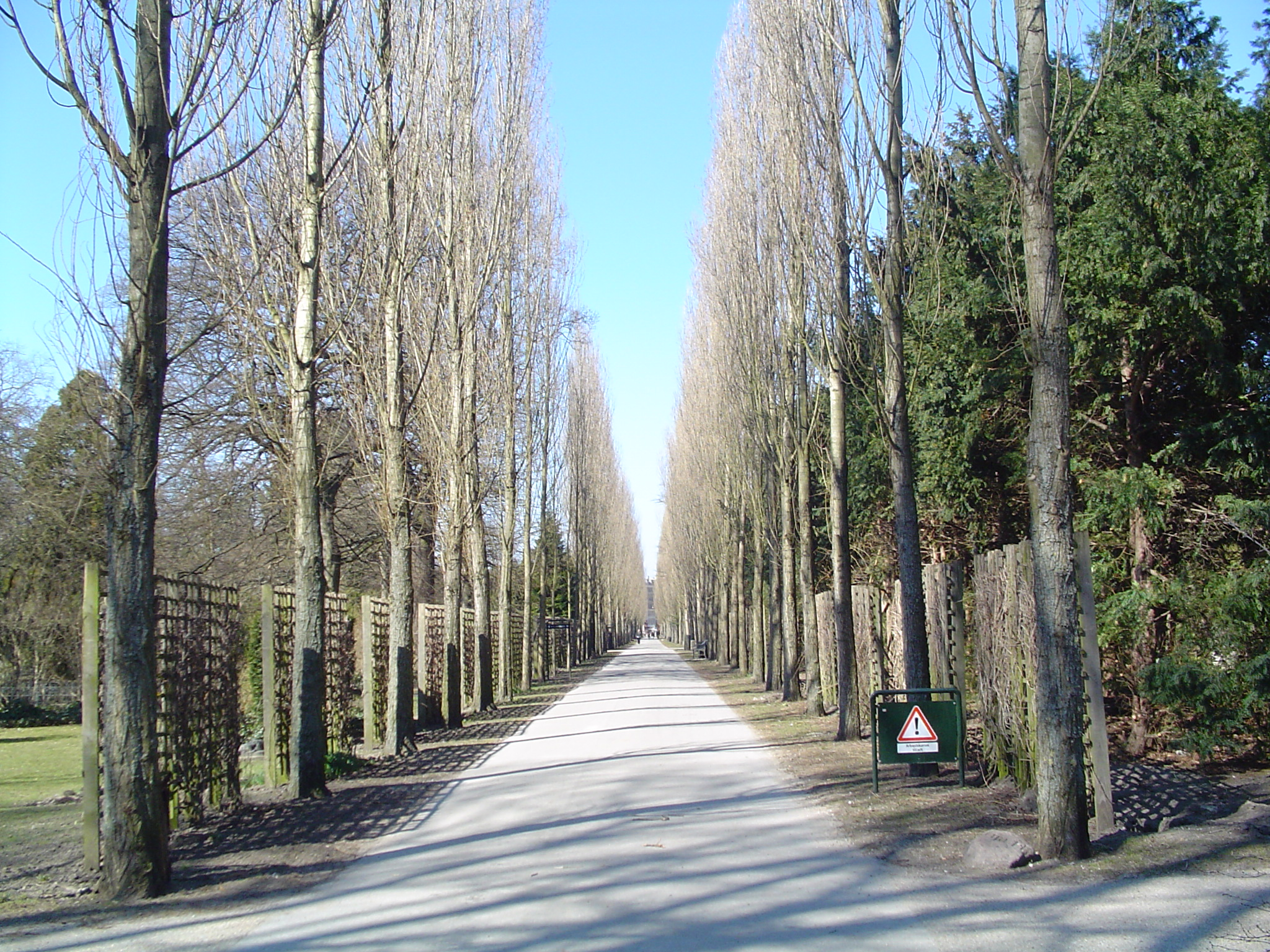
- Interactive map of Assistens Cemetery

Details
- Established: 1760
- Location: Nørrebro, Copenhagen
- Country: Denmark
- Size: 25 hectares
- Website: www.assistens.dk

Assistens Cemetery (Danish: Assistens Kirkegård) in Copenhagen, Denmark, is the burial place of many notable Danes, as well as an important green-space in the Nørrebro district.

Established in 1760, the cemetery was originally a burial ground for the poor, laid out to relieve the crowded graveyards inside the city walls, but during the Golden Age, in the first half of the 19th century, it became fashionable, and many leading figures of the epoch, including Hans Christian Andersen, Søren Kierkegaard, Christoffer Wilhelm Eckersberg, and Christen Købke are buried here.

Late in the 19th century, as Assistens Cemetery had itself become crowded, a number of new cemeteries were established around Copenhagen, including the Vestre Cemetery, but through the 20th century, it continued to attract notable people. Among the latter are the Nobel Prize-winning physicist Niels Bohr and a number of American jazz musicians who settled in Copenhagen during the 1950s and 1960s, including Ben Webster and Kenny Drew.

An assistenskirkegård (meaning 'auxiliary cemetery') is originally a generic term in Danish, used to refer to cemeteries which were laid out to assist existing burial sites, usually those located in urban settings in connection with churches, and therefore a number of cemeteries of the same name are found around Denmark.

The cemetery is one of five now run by Copenhagen Municipality; the other four are Vestre Cemetery, Brønshøj Cemetery, Sundby Cemetery, and Bispebjerg Cemetery.

== History ==
=== Background ===
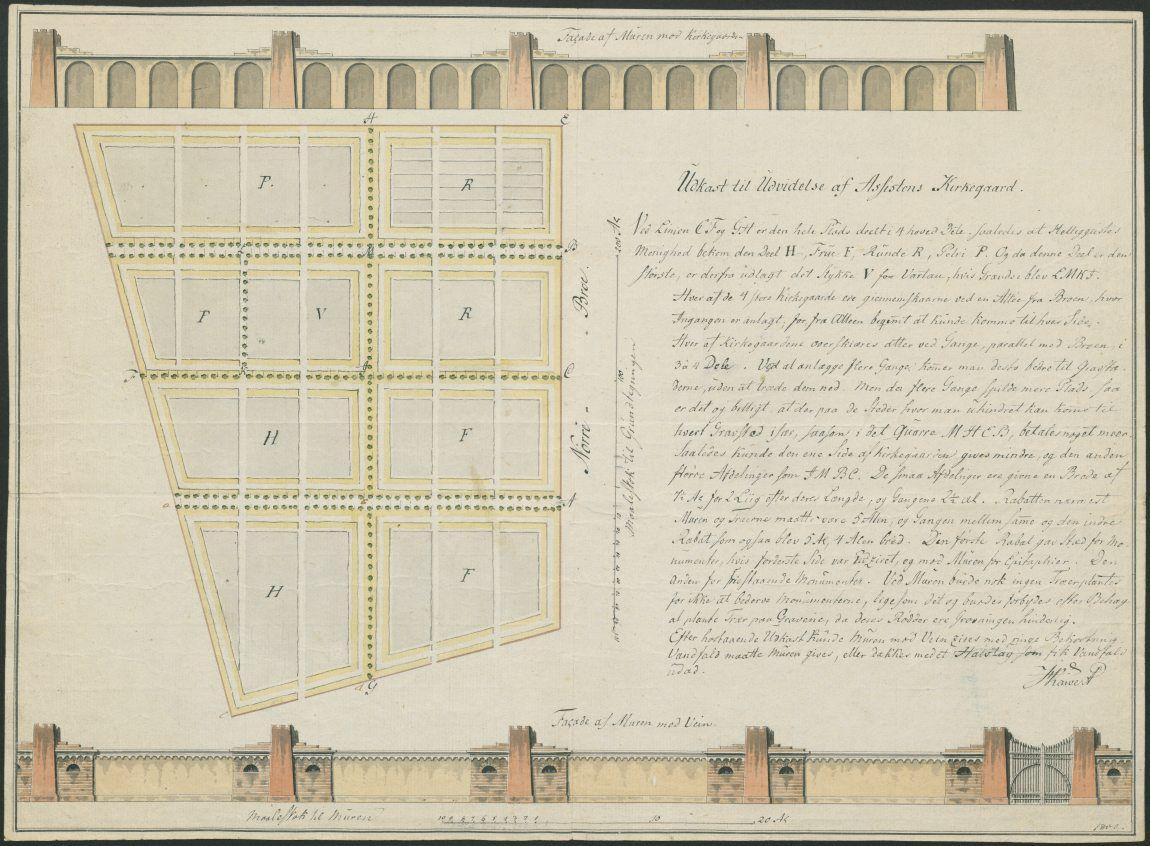
Plan of the cemetery from 1800 by Jørgen Henrich Rawert

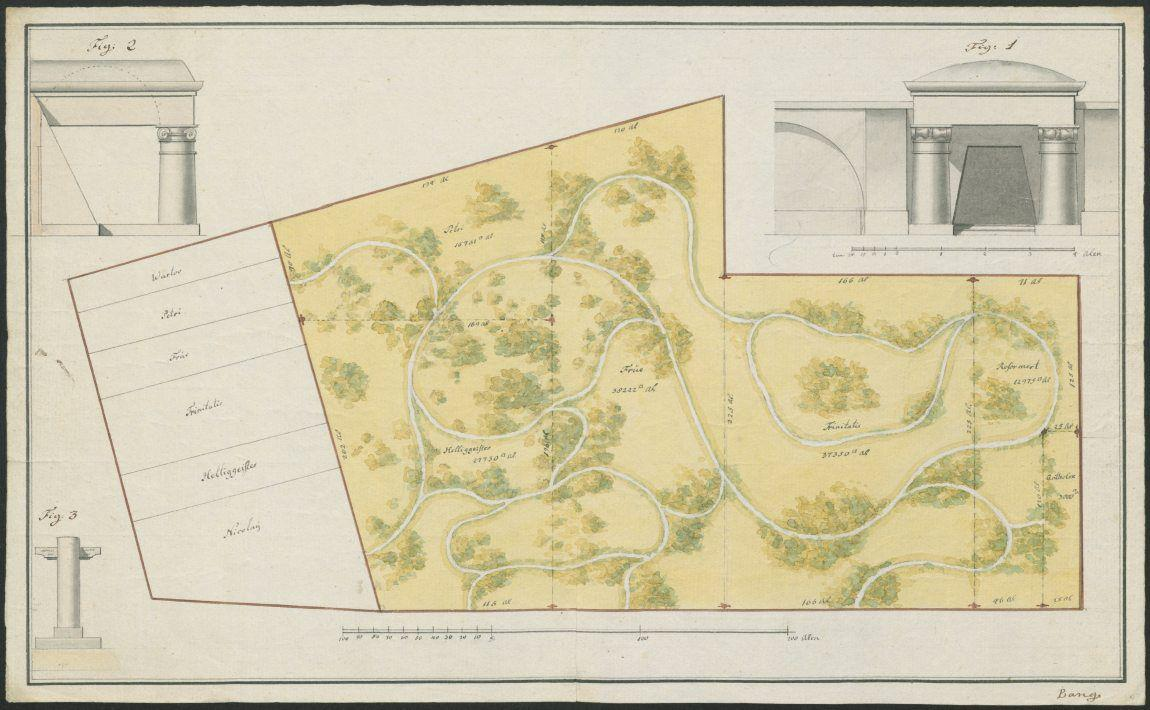
Plan of the cemetery from c. 1800

In the Middle Ages, entombment within buildings was the general rule in Denmark, although outdoor graveyards gradually became more common. In 1666, the Royal Danish Navy's Holmen Cemetery was moved from its original location at Holmen Church to a site outside the Eastern City Gate, becoming the first burial ground to be located outside the city walls.

An outbreak of plague in 1711 killed an estimated 23,000 inhabitants and put the existing burial grounds under so much pressure that up to five coffins were sometimes buried on top of each other. This led to the establishment of five new cemeteries on the periphery of the city, but still just inside the city walls, while the military Garrison Cemetery was relocated to land next to that of the Holmen Cemetery.

=== Establishment of the new cemetery ===
In the 1750s, the situation worsened even further, and in a letter of 2 May 1757 the City Council proposed to the Chancellery that a large new cemetery should be laid out outside the city walls for the city's parishes . After some negotiations, it was decided to place this outside the Northern City Gate, and on 26 May 1757 the new facility was founded by Royal charter. The new cemetery was inaugurated on 6 November 1760. It was enclosed by a wall built by Philip de Lange.

Originally, the cemetery was intended as a burial ground for paupers. In 1785, in a codicil to his will, Johan Samuel Augustin, an affluent citizen, astronomical writer, and First Secretary of the War Chancellery, made a specific request to be buried in the cemetery, stating that "Mein Begräbnis soll auf dem Armen-Kirchhofe vor dem Norderthor seyn, wesfalls ich schon mit Mr. Simon, der dort Gräber ist, gesprochen habe". He was soon followed by other leading figures from the ruling class, and the cemetery developed into the most fashionable burial ground of the city.

=== A popular excursion spot ===
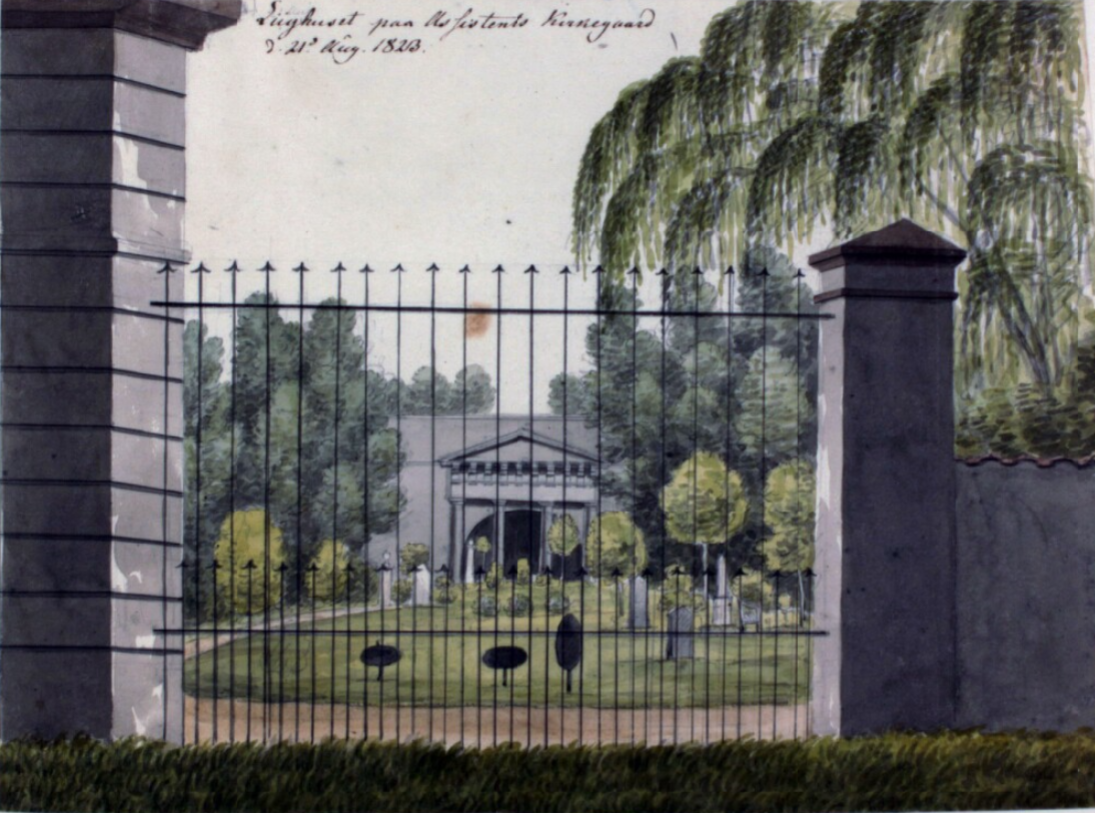
Ole Jørgen Rawert: Assistens Cemetery, 26 August 1825

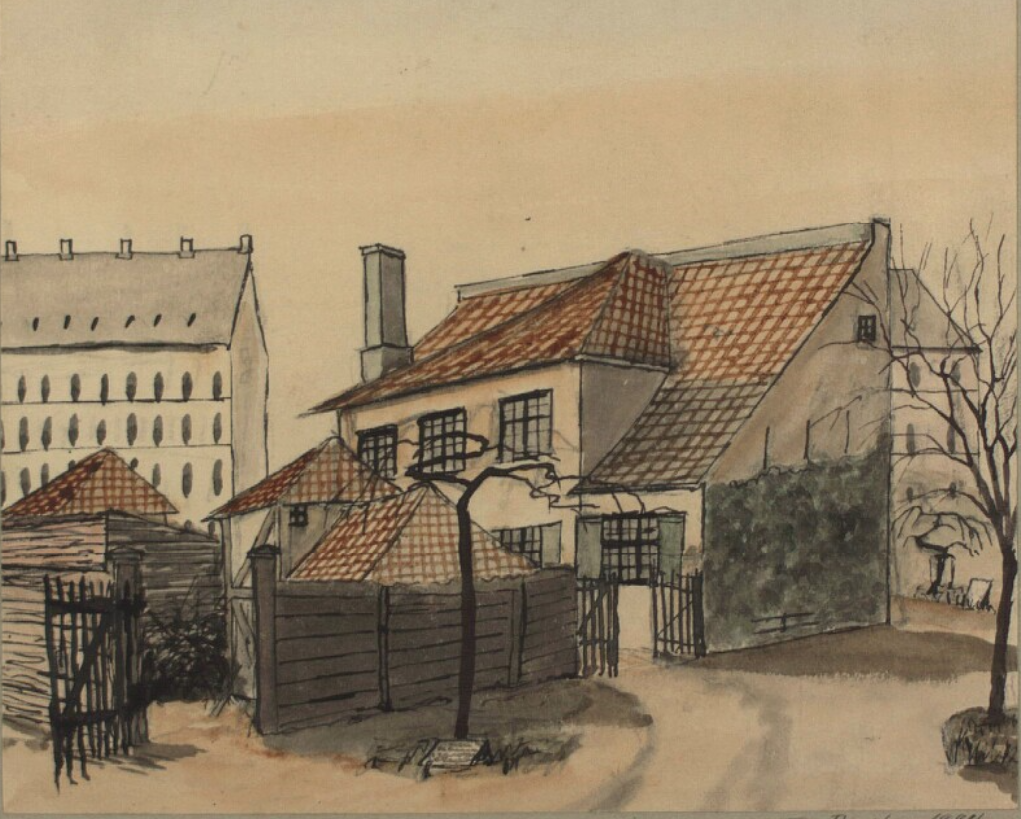
The Gravedigger's House in 1884

Around that time, excursions to the cemetery with picnic baskets and tea became a popular activity among common citizens of Copenhagen. In his account of a visit to Copenhagen in 1827, the Swedish poet Karl August Nicander fondly remembers Assistens Cemetery:

In order to enjoy another softer, quieter celebration, I walked out one evening through Nørre Port (the North Gate) to the so-called Assistens Cemetery. It is certainly one of the most beautiful graveyards in Europe. Leafy trees, dark paths, bright open flowery expanses, temples shaded by poplars, marble tombs overhung by weeping willows, and urns or crosses wrapped in swathes of roses, fragrance and bird song, all transform this place of death into a little paradise.

— Karl August Nicander

The excursions sometimes evolved into rowdy gatherings and legislation was passed to prevent this. A commission established in 1805 issued instructions which prohibited the consumption of food or drink as well as music or any other kind of cheerful behaviour in the cemetery. The gravediggers, who lived on the premises, were to enforce these restrictions but they seem to have taken their duties lightly. Legislation from 1813 prohibited them to sell alcohol to visitors to the cemetery. Despite all these efforts, the desired peace and quiet was a long time in coming. For particularly grand funerals, crowds of spectators would gather, and people would festoon the cemetery walls to get a better view. To reduce numbers of visitors, there was talk of introducing admission fees, but this was never carried out.

== Assistens Cemetery today ==
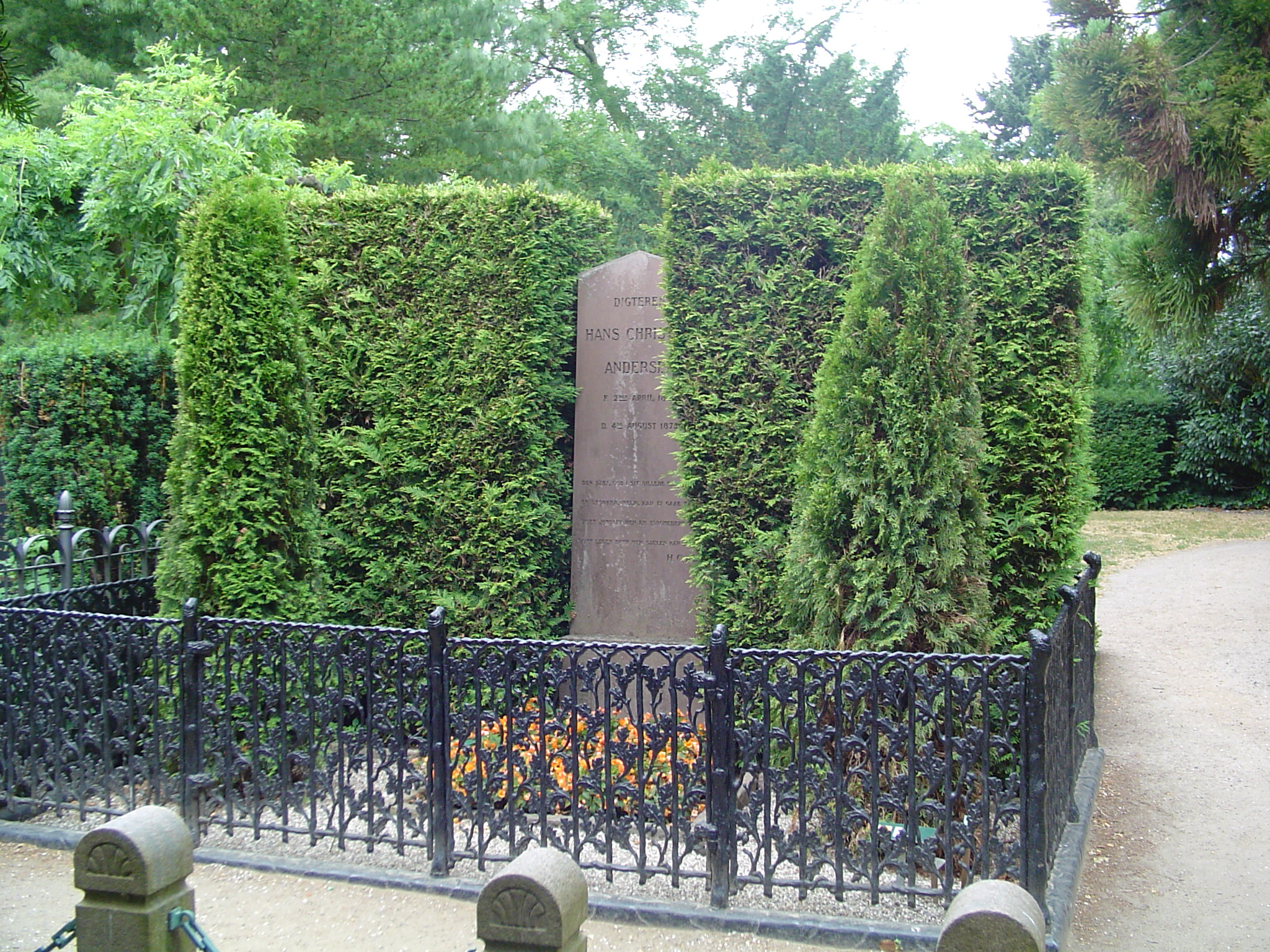
Danish author Hans Christian Andersen's grave (replaced memorial stone)

The cemetery is still serving its original purpose as a burial ground but is also a popular tourist attraction, as well as the largest and most important green space in the inner part of the Nørrebro district.

It is divided into sections. The oldest part is Section A and features the graves of Søren Kierkegaard and the painter Christen Købke among others. Section D is dedicated to religious minorities, containing Roman Catholic and Reformed graves as well as Russian graves. Section E is the section which originally served the Church of Denmark's important Church of Our Lady.

== Herman Stilling Museum ==
In 2003 an old horse stable in a corner of Assistens Cemetery was converted into a small museum dedicated to writer and artist Herman Stilling, a native to the Nørrebro area and mainly known for painting trolls. Apart from the permanent exhibition, the museum also contains an exhibition space for special exhibitions, a picture workshop for children and young people, and a café.

== Notable interments ==
- Kjeld Abell
- Nicolai Abildgaard
- Peter Christian Abildgaard
- Daniel Adzer
- Svend Aggerholm
- Christian Aigens
- Peter Adler Alberti
- Sophie Alberti
- Hans Christian Andersen (buried at the Collin family grave, but the stone was moved to another graveyard in 1914, Frederiksberg Ældre Kirkegård)
- Carl Christoffer Georg Andræ
- Christian Arntzen
- Johan Samuel Augustin
- Oluf Lundt Bang
- Peter Georg Bang
- Christian Bastholm
- Christian Bauditz
- Hans Heinrich Baumgarten
- Christian Frederik Beck
- Andreas Peter Berggreen
- Dorte-Maria Bjarnov
- Claes Birch
- H. W. Bissen
- Louis Bobé
- Allan Bock
- Andreas Bodenhoff
- Giertrud Birgitte Bodenhoff
- Christian Bohr
- Harald Bohr
- Niels Bohr
- Robert Bojesen
- Richard Bently Boone
- Bonaparte Borgen
- Vilhelm August Borgen
- André Bork
- Frederik Christian Bornemann
- Mathias Hastrup Bornemann
- Johan Henrich Brandemann
- Hans Brøchner
- Emil Bähncke
- Wilhelm Bähncke
- Ludvig Bødtcher
- P. C. Bønecke
- Etta Cameron
- Karen Caspersen
- Peter Atke Castberg
- John Christensen
- Villads Christensen
- Ernst Christiansen
- Andreas Clemmensen
- Mogens Clemmensen
- Christoph Cloëtta
- Christian Colbiørnsen
- Johan Christian Severin Danielsen
- Ferdinand Didrichsen
- Karen Dissing
- Frederik Drejer
- Kenny Drew
- Otto Steen Due
- William Frederik Duntzfelt
- C.W. Eckersberg
- Erling Eckersberg
- Jens Eckersberg
- Jakob Ejersbo
- Peter Elfelt
- Sigurd Elkjær
- Johannes Erwig
- Otto Evens
- Peter Faber (Danish telegraph specialist)
- Peter Didrik Weinreich Fischer
- Johan Georg Forchhammer
- Hermann Ernst Freund
- Astrid Friis
- Johannes Frederik Frølich
- G. E. C. Gad
- Ludvig Gade
- Vincenzo Galeotti
- Peter Gemzøe
- Jens Giødwad
- Emanuel Gregers
- Ken Gudman
- Søren Gyldendal
- Hugo Gyldmark
- Inger-Lise Gaarde
- P. C. Hagemann
- Andreas Hallander
- Søren Hallar
- Poul Hanmann
- Christian Hansen
- Dagmar Hansen
- Frantz Johannes Hansen
- Niels Jacob Hansen
- Rudolph Hansen
- Rasmus Harboe
- C. F. Harsdorff
- Otto Haslund
- Sven Hauptmann
- Mathilde Malling Hauschultz
- Anker Heegaard
- Henry Heerup
- Betty Hennings
- Henrik Hennings
- Christian Severin Henrichsen
- Christian Ludvig August Herforth
- Johan Daniel Herholdt
- Henrik Hertz
- Christian Frederik Hetsch
- Georg Hilker
- N. P. Hillebrandt
- Tage Hind
- Theodor Hirth
- Angelo Hjort
- Frants Christian Hjorth
- Søren Hjorth
- Holger-Madsen
- Georg Holgreen
- Kenny Holst
- Niels Henrik Holst
- Ferdinand Hoppe
- C. F. E. Horneman
- Emil Horneman
- Christian Hornemann
- Emil Hornemann
- Jens Wilken Hornemann
- Frantz Gotthard Howitz
- Georg Howitz
- Chresten Hørdum
- Valdemar Ingemann
- R.P. Ipsen
- Christen Jacobsen
- Palle Jacobsen
- Birger Jensen
- Frederik Jensen
- Valdemar Jensen
- Christian Magdalus Jespersen
- Christian Magdalus Jespersen
- Ejner Johansson
- J.F. Johnstrup
- Henri Alexandre Antoine de Dompierre de Jonquières
- Jean André Frédéric de Dompierre de Jonquières
- Jens Juel
- Finn Juhl
- Pia Juul
- Karen Jønsson
- Ellen Jørgensen
- Henriette Jørgensen
- Eugen Jørgensen
- Elisabeth Karlinsky
- Asmus Kaufmann
- Søren Kierkegaard
- August Klein
- Charlotte Klein
- Vilhelm Klein
- P. Knudsen
- Jørgen Hansen Koch
- Thomas Koppel
- Lars Andreas Kornerup
- Bamse Kragh-Jacobsen
- Johan Krohn
- Niels Brock Krossing
- Hans Ernst Krøyer
- Henrik Nikolai Krøyer
- Friedrich Kuhlau
- Christen Købke
- Julius Lange
- Florian Larsen
- Johannes Ephraim Larsen
- Jørgen Larsen
- Jørn Larsen
- Knud Larsen
- Edvard Lembcke
- Frederik L. Levy
- Martin Lindblom
- Leo Lipschitz
- Carl Lundbye
- Bianco Luno
- Poul de Løvenørn
- Carl F. Madsen
- Finn Ejnar Madsen
- Oscar Madsen
- Johan Nicolai Madvig
- Finnur Magnússon
- Peter Malberg
- Sonja Ferlov Mancoba
- Anne Marie "Madam" Mangor
- Peter Mariager
- Sophus Marstrand
- Troels Marstrand
- Wilhelm Marstrand
- Hans Lassen Martensen
- Anton Melbye
- Lauritz Melchior
- Axel Meyer
- Fritz Meyer
- Adam Ludvig Moltke
- Kate Mundt
- Adam Müller
- Jakob Peter Mynster
- Alfred Møller
- Axel Møller
- Carl Møller
- Julie Møller
- Poul Martin Møller
- Valdemar Møller
- Franz Nachtegall
- Niels Sigfred Nebelong
- Niels Neergaard
- Robert Neergaard
- Martin Andersen Nexø
- Ole Nezer
- Christian V. Nielsen
- Henriette Nielsen
- Lean Nielsen
- Peter Nielsen
- Johan Nilsson
- Henrik S. Nissen
- Rasmus Nyerup
- Kim Nørrevig
- Sigvald Olsen
- Olga Ott
- Carl Otto
- Joseph Owen
- Ulrich Peter Overby
- Holger Simon Paulli
- Andreas Paulsen
- Gustav Pedersen
- Vilhelm Pedersen
- Anna Petersen
- Knud Arne Petersen
- Christian Ulrik Adolph Plesner
- Johan Martin Quist
- C.C. Rafn
- Rasmus Rask
- Lauritz Rasmussen
- E. Rasmussen Eilersen
- Louise Ravn-Hansen
- C.E. Reich
- Ebbe Kløvedal Reich
- C.A. Reitzel
- Heinrich Anna Reventlow-Criminil
- Amdi Riis
- Johan Christian Riise
- Svend Rindom
- Frederik Rohde
- Emmery Rondahl
- C.N. Rosenkilde
- J.F. Rosenstand
- Carl Eduard Rotwitt
- Natasja Saad
- Emilie Sannom
- Ragnhild Sannom
- Jens August Schade
- Virtus Schade
- Anna Margrethe Schall
- Claus Schall
- Henrik Scharling
- Hans Scherfig
- Peter Schiønning
- Gottfried Wilhelm Christian von Schmettau
- Marinus Schneider
- Peter von Scholten
- Otto Schondel
- Julius Schovelin
- Georg Ludvig von der Schulenburg
- Frans Schwartz
- Johan Adam Schwartz
- Johan Georg Schwartz
- Clara Schønfeld
- Emmy Schønfeld
- Giuseppe Siboni
- Joakim Skovgaard
- P.C. Skovgaard
- Caspar Wilhelm Smith
- Per Sonne
- Petrine Sonne
- Andreas Schack Steenberg
- Japetus Steenstrup
- Johannes Steenstrup
- Ernst Wilhelm Stibolt
- Johanne Stockmarr
- Edvard Storm
- Michael Strunge
- Holger Strøm
- Theodor Stuckenberg
- Viggo Stuckenberg
- Christian Sørensen
- Jazz-Kay Sørensen
- Søren Sørensen
- Theodor Sørensen
- Thorvald Sørensen
- C.A.F. Thomsen
- Emma Thomsen
- Magdalene Thoresen
- Jens Jørgen Thorsen
- Johan Clemens Tode
- Vilhelm Topsøe
- Dan Turèll
- Vilhelm Tvede
- August Tørsleff
- Nils Ufer
- Georg Ulmer
- Georges Ulmer
- Moritz Unna
- Jens Vahl
- Martin Vahl (1749-1804)
- Martin Vahl (1869-1946)
- Mogens Vantore
- Frederik Vermehren
- Martha Wærn (1741–1812). philanthropist
- Morten Wærn
- Gregers Wad
- Eugen Warming
- Jens Warming
- Ben Webster
- Carl Weitemeyer
- Clemens Weller
- Caspar Wessel
- Edvard Westerberg
- Johannes Wiedewelt
- Christian Peder Wienberg
- Anton Wilhelm Wiehe
- Michael Wiehe
- Charlotte Wiehe-Berény
- Carl Winsløw
- Anna Wulff
- William Christopher Zeise
- Otto F. Zeltner
- G.C. Zinck
- H.O.C. Zinck
- Josephine Zinck
- Ludvig Zinck
- Marie Zinck
- Otto Zinck
- Hans Christian Ørsted
