= Zinck =

Zinck is a surname. Notable people with the surname include:

- Hardenack Otto Conrad Zinck (1746–1832), German-Danish composer
- Kenneth Zinck (born 1959), Fijian politician
- Marie Zinck (1789–1823), Danish actress and opera singer
- Pia Zinck (born 1971), Danish high jumper
- Trevor Zinck (born 1970), Canadian politician
