= Skindergade 36 =

Listed building in Copenhagen

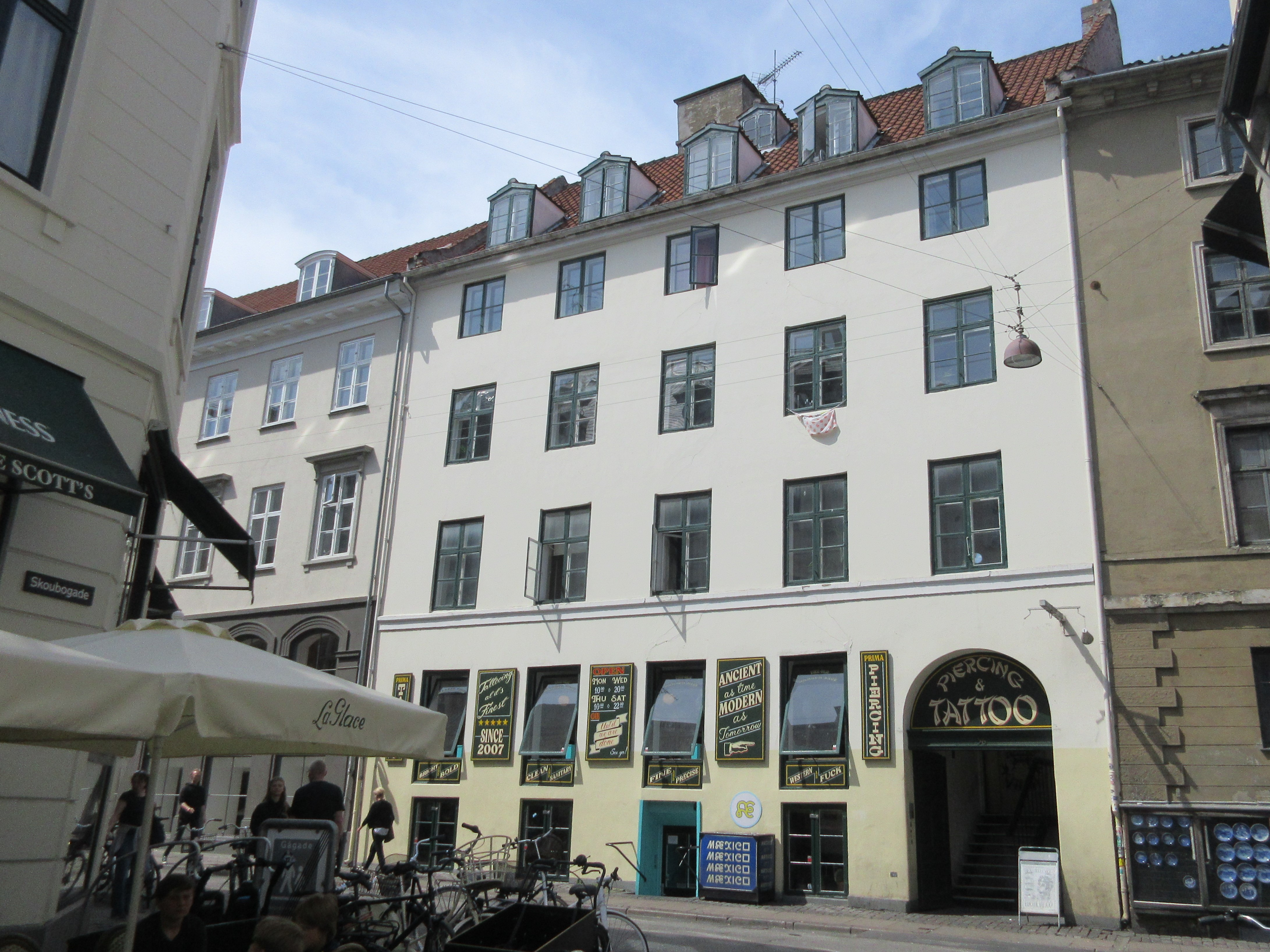
- Skindergade 36 viewed from Skouboegade in 2023.
- Interactive map of the Skindergade 36 area

General information
- Location: Copenhagen, Denmark
- Coordinates: 55°40′43.93″N 12°34′23.59″E
- Completed: 1813

Skindergade 36/Dyrkøb 3 is a Neoclassical building complex situated close to Gammeltorv in the Old Town of Copenhagen, Denmark. It consists of a five-bays-wide, four-storey building in Skindergade and another five-bays-wide, four-storey building in Dyrkøb as well as a side wing which connects the two buildings along the west side of a central courtyard. The Dyrkøb building fronts the south side of the Church of Our Lady. N. J. Frænckels Stiftelse, a private senior citizens home administrated by the Jewish congregation, was located in the building from 1899 until 1961. The building complex was listed in the Danish registry of protected buildings and places in 1945. Notable former residents include the painter Niels Simonsen, musician in the Royal Danish Orchestra H. S. Paulli (1810–1891) and theologian and translator Edvard Lembcke (1815–1897).

== History ==
=== 17rg century ===
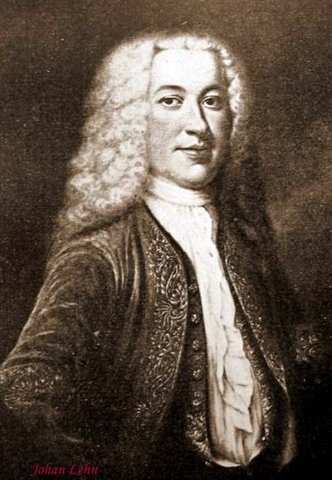
Johan Lehn

A wine house on the site was known as Dyrkøb ("expensive purchase") from at least 1622. It was from this venture that the street Dyrkøb later took its name. The name positioned it in the market as a more high-end alternative to Godtkøb ("cheap purchase"), another wine house, mostly frequented by students. On 11 November 1645 the property was acquired by wine merchant Johan Lehn. He had come to Copenhagen from Rhinegnene in around 1640. In 1668–81, he was a councilman in Copenhagen. In 1655–78, he was church eldest (kirkeældste) at St. Peter's Church. He was married to Sara von Dickelen.

On 29 June 1685, the property was passed to his son Abraham Lehn. He owned his own fleet of merchant ships, was also active as a general trader, and for a while served as director of the Danish East India Company. His property was listed in Copenhagen's first cadastre of 1689 as No. 9 in Klædebo Quarter. In 1699, Lehn sold part of the property to the Church of Our Lady for an extension of the churchyard. In 1703, he constructed the Lehn House on Strandgade in Christianshavn.

Abraham Lehn's sons Abraham Lehn Jr. and Johan Lehn were brought up in the home of their brother-in-law Christian Schupp after their father's death in 1709. They would later both become major landowners. Abraham Lehn Jr. bought a number of estates on Lollabnd. Johan Lehn settled at Hvidkilde Manor on Funen.

=== 18th century ===
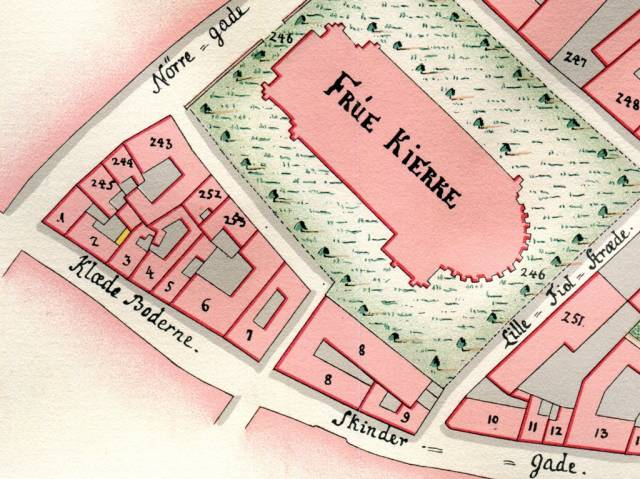
No. 7 seen on a detail from Christian Gedde's map of Klædebo Quarter, 1757.

On 21 December 1720, Lehn's former property was acquired by kommerceråd Jørgen Sohl. He was married to Ingeborg Johanne Brunstorff. He remained the owner of the building until 20 October 1728. The property was listed in the new cadastre of 1756 as No. 7 in Klædebo Quarter, owned by wine seller (vintapper) Jacob Rohde. His property was separated from No. 8 by the northern end of Skouboegade sonce the street continued all the way to Dyrkøb at that time.

The property was home to 17 residents in three households at the 1787 census. Torben Smidt, a wine merchant, resided in the building with a 22-year-old apprentice. Niels Urban Aarestrup, director of the Danish West India Company and a former governor of the Danish Gold Coast, resided in the building with his wife Marthe Marie Niemann, their four children (aged one to seven), his sister Maren Aarestrup (widow), his nephew Andreas Støver, a wet nurse and two maids. Nicolaj Bok, a chamber servant, resided in the building with his wife Elsebet Margrethe, their 21-year-old son Morten Christian Bok and one maid.

=== 19th century ===
The property was home to 15 residents at the 1801 census. Lars Clemmensen Kofoed, a distiller, resided in the building with his wife Mette Maria Rindum, a brewery worker and a maid. Niels Holm, a sailor, resided in the building with his wife Cathrine Elisabeth Neergaard. The other residents were the Jewish merchant Moses Goldsmit, his sisters Marthe Goldsmit and Birgitte Goldsmit, wine merchant Didrich Henrich Schorlung, one male servant, two maids and two lodgers.

In the new cadastre of 1806, the property was once again listed as No. 7 in Klædebo Quarter. It was still owned by Lars Clemmensen Kofoed at that time. The property was the following year destroyed in the British bombardment of Copenhagen. The British troops aimed for the spire of the Church of Our Lady and the area around it was therefore particularly hard hit.

The fire site was later acquired by master mason Jens Hansen Lund. The present building in Skindergade was constructed for him in 1813. A single-storey building towards Durjøb was constructed for him in 1813–14.

The painter Niels Simonsen was a resident in the building in the years around 1834. Musician in the Royal Danish Orchestra H. S. Paulli (1810–1891) was a resident in the building in 1839. Edvard Lembcke (1815–1897), a theologian and translator of Shakespeare, resided in one of the apartments from 1838 to 1841.

=== Gothelf Frederik Ferdinand Tesch ===
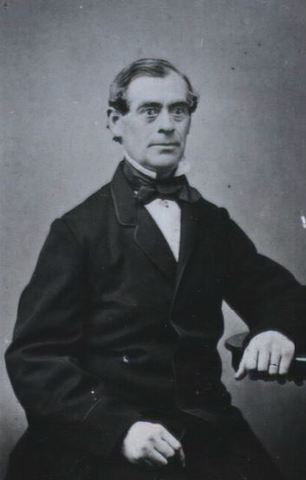
Gothilf Frederik Ferdinand Tesch

The property was at some point acquired by shoemaker L. Tesch . In 1850–51, he had the building towards Dyrkøb heightened with three storeys.

The building towards Skindergade (then Klædeboderne) was home to 36 residents at the 1860 census. Gothilf Frederik Ferdinand Tesch (1810–1882), a master shoemaker, resided on the first floor with his wife Anne Christiane (née Krause, 1819–1879), their ten children (aged three to 19) and one maid. Margrethe Isaachsen, widow of a consul-general, resided on the second floor with three unmarried daughters (aged 44 to 47), one maid and the lodger Carl Ferdinand Bruus (captain in the 2md Jæger Corps). Georg August Emanuel Müller, a former custons officer in Ribe (sustitsråd), resided on the third floor with his wife Hanne Rebekka Elisabeth Müller and one maid. Christiane Hedevig Hoff, a 65-year-old unmarried woman, resided in the garret. Hanchen Salomonsen, widow of a cotton manufacturer (varfabrikant), resided on the ground floor with two unmarried daughters (aged 21 and 33), her cousin Augusta Jacobsen and one maid. Svend Larsen, a grocer (spækhøker), resided in the basement with his wife Henriette Vilhelmine Larsen, their five children (aged one to 15).

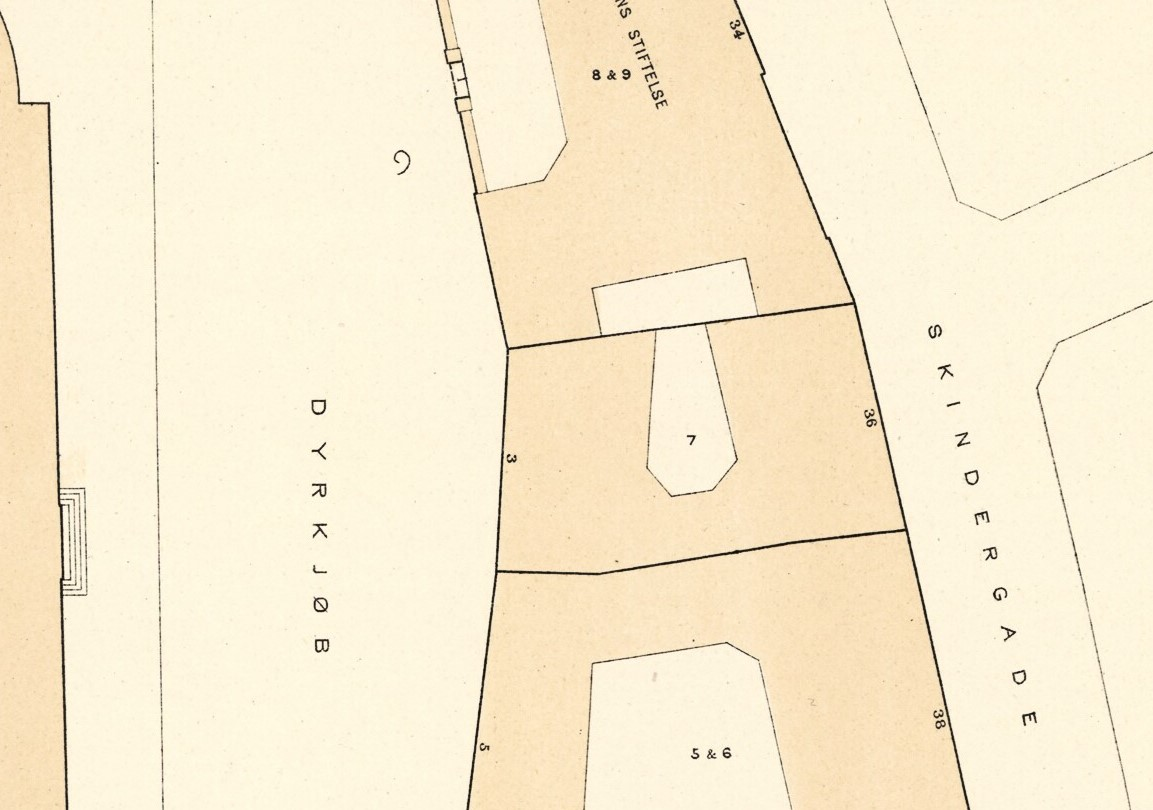
Skindergade 36 and Dyrkøb 3 seen on a detail from one of Berggreen's block plans of Klædebo Quarter, 1886–88.

The building towards Dyrkøb was home to 29 residents. Peter Christian Rosengreen, a bookkeeper at the University of Copenhagen, resided on the first floor with his wife Jensine Dorthea Rosengreen, their two daughters (aged nine and 13) and one maid. Vilhelm Hjort, a civil servant in General Post Directorate and former MO with title of justitsråd, resided on the second floor with the 76-year-old woman Louise Emilie Schønning and the 27-year-old woman Thora Marie Møller- Ellen Kristine Reinicke, a widow, resided on the third floor with three unmarried daughters (aged 41 to 51) and two lodgers. Hans Madsen, a 40-year-old man employed by a haulier, resided in the garret with his wife Maren Madsen and their one-year-old son. Peter Laurentius Andersen, a businessman (varemægler), resided on the ground floor to the right with his wife Hanne Georgine Andersen, their three-year-old daughter and one maid. Alvilda Christine Rist, a 49-year-old unmarried woman, resided on the ground floor to the left. Hans Klausen, a workman, resided in the basement with his wife Henriette Klausen and three children (aged three to 20). Cecilie Marie Petersen, a widow doing laundry and blocking hats, resided in the basement to the left with the 33-year-old woman Hansine Marie Petersen (needlework).

Gothilf Frederik Ferdinand Tesch resided in the building until his death in 1882.

=== 20th century ===
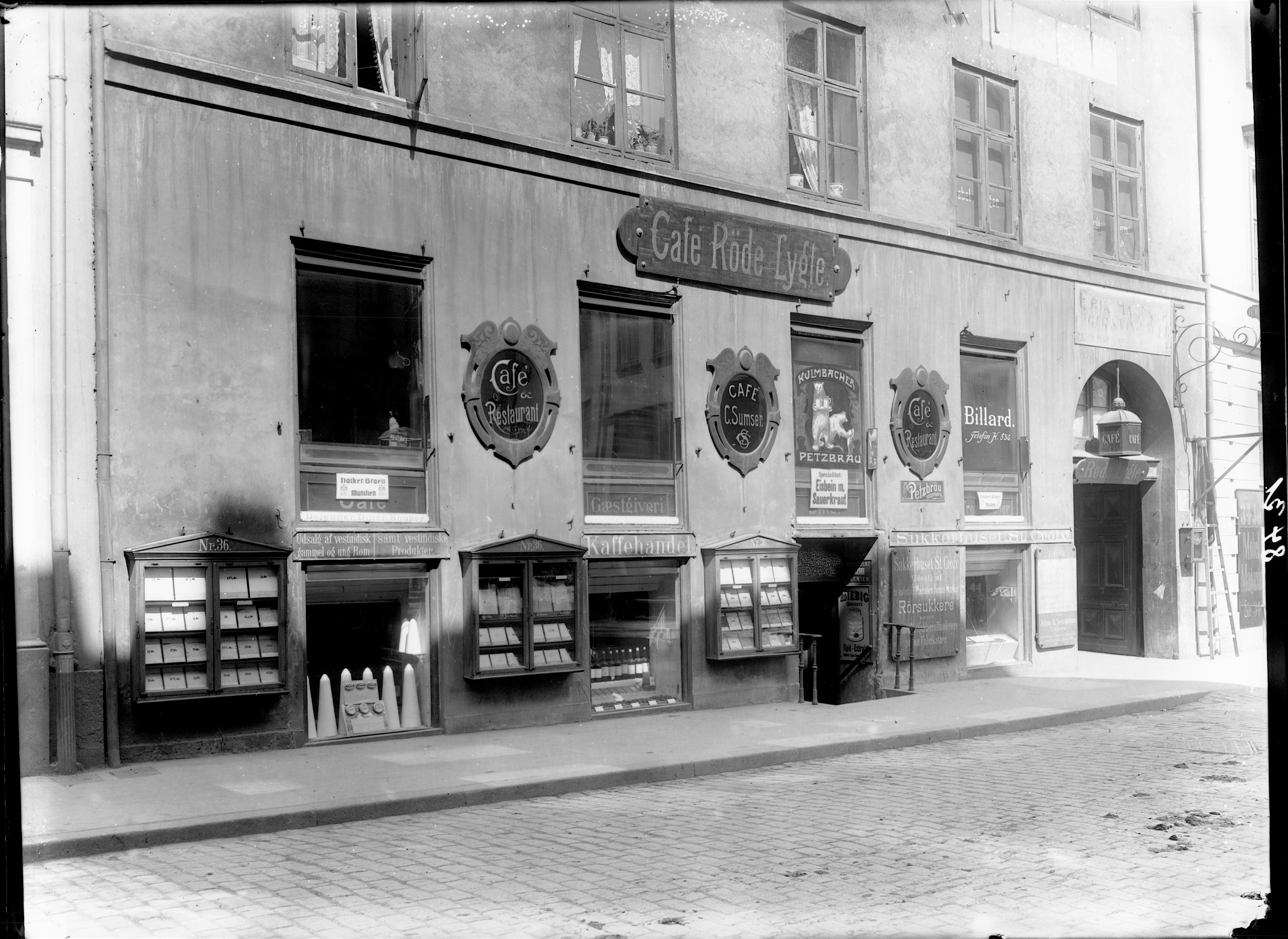
Café Røde Lygte and the antiquarian bookshop photographed by Peter Elfelt in 1909.

The property was at some point acquired by the Jewish lawyer Joseph Frænckel. On 23 April 1899, he converted Syrkøb 3 into a home for Jewish senior citizens. It was open to Jewish men over 60 and women over 55 "who are worthy and needy and lead a pious and quiet life". In October 1851, it relocated to Utterslev.

Café Røde Lygte occupied the ground floor of Skindergade 36 in the 10++s. An antiquarian bookshop was located in the basement. It was later replaced by a shop called Sukkerhuset.

== Architecture ==
Skindergade 36 is constructed with four storeys over a walk-out basement. The five-bays-wide facade is plastered and white-painted. A gate topped by a fanlight is located in the bay furthest to the right. The basement entrance is located in the third bay from the left. It was originally topped by a hood mould supported by corbels, but it has later been removed. The pitched roof is clad in red tiles.

Dyrkøb 3 is also five bays wide and constructed with four storeys over a walk-out basement. The plastered, sand-coloured facade is finished with a cornice band above the ground floor, a sill course below the third-floor windows and a belt course above them, and a cornice below the roof. Other decorative elements include stucco ornamentation below the first floor windows and projecting sills supported by corbels on the second floor. All the decorative elements are painted yellow. The main entrance is located in the central bay. The two basement entrances are located in the outer bays.

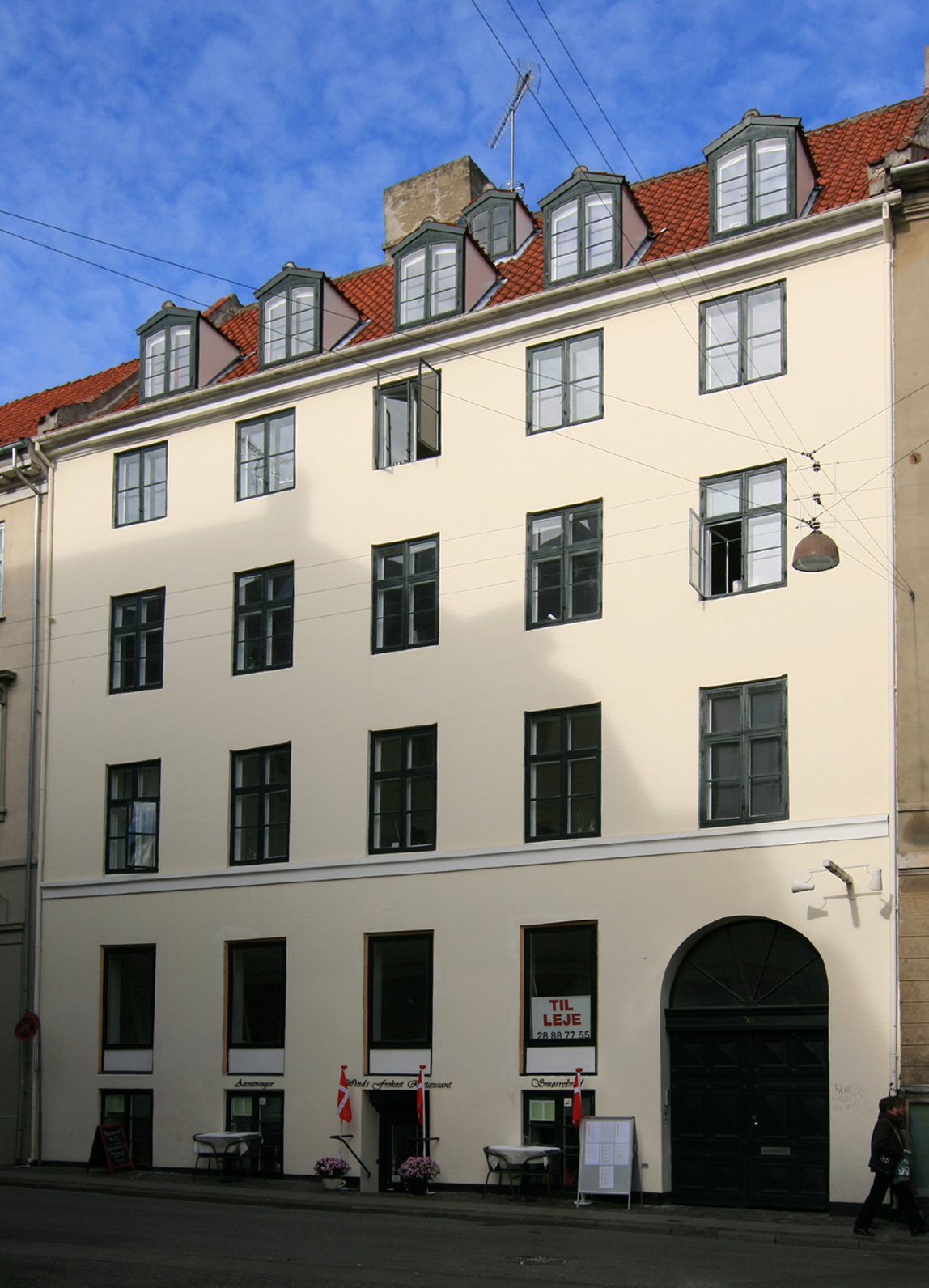
Skindergade 36

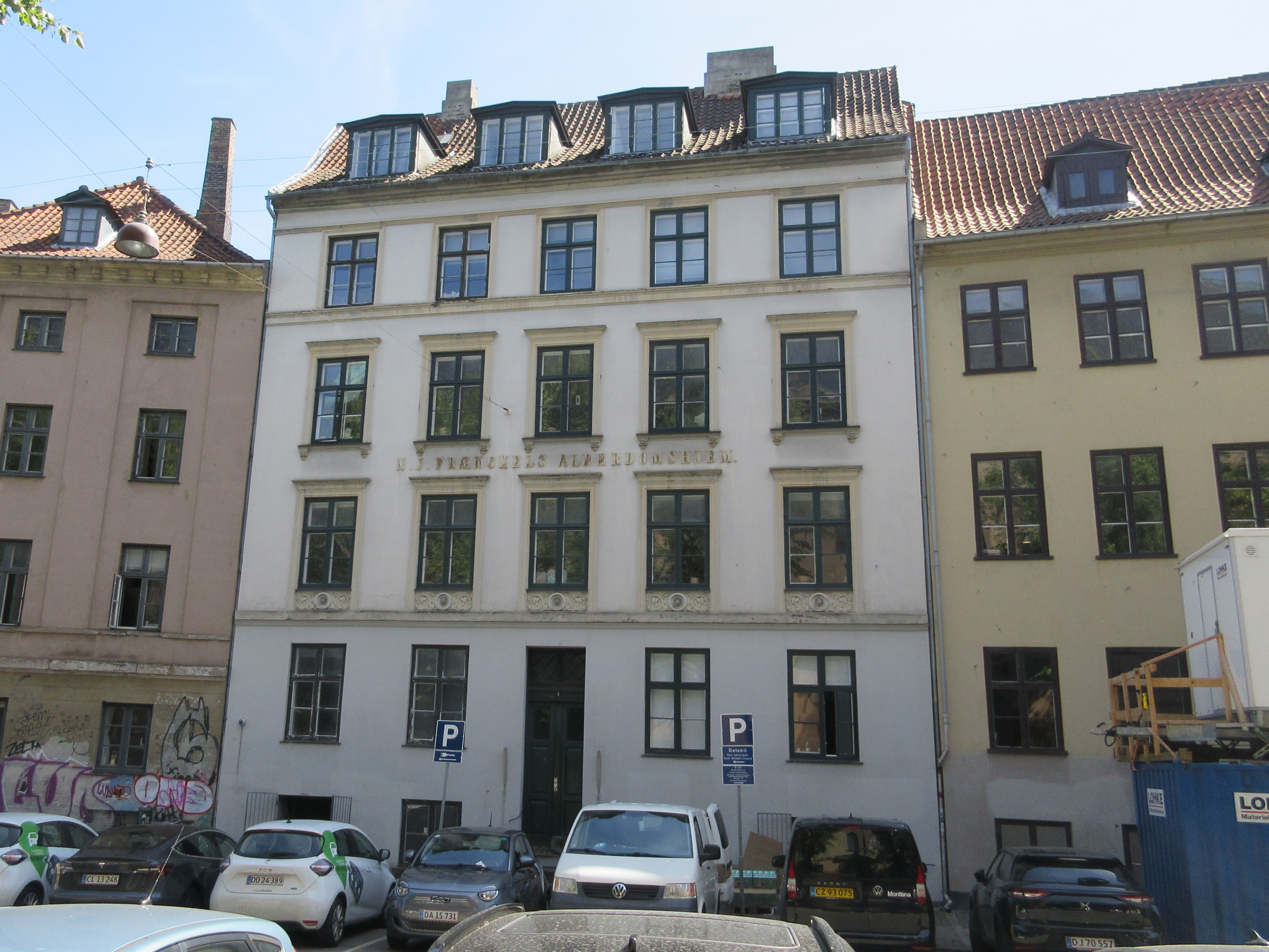
Dyrkøb 3.

== Today ==
Skindergade 36 houses a ship on the ground floor, a bar in the basement and a single residential apartment on each of the upper floors. Dyrkøb 3 contains a single residential apartment on each of its four floors. The property is jointly owned by the owners via E/F Skindergade 36.
