= Georg Anton Rasmussen =

Norwegian painter (1842–1914)

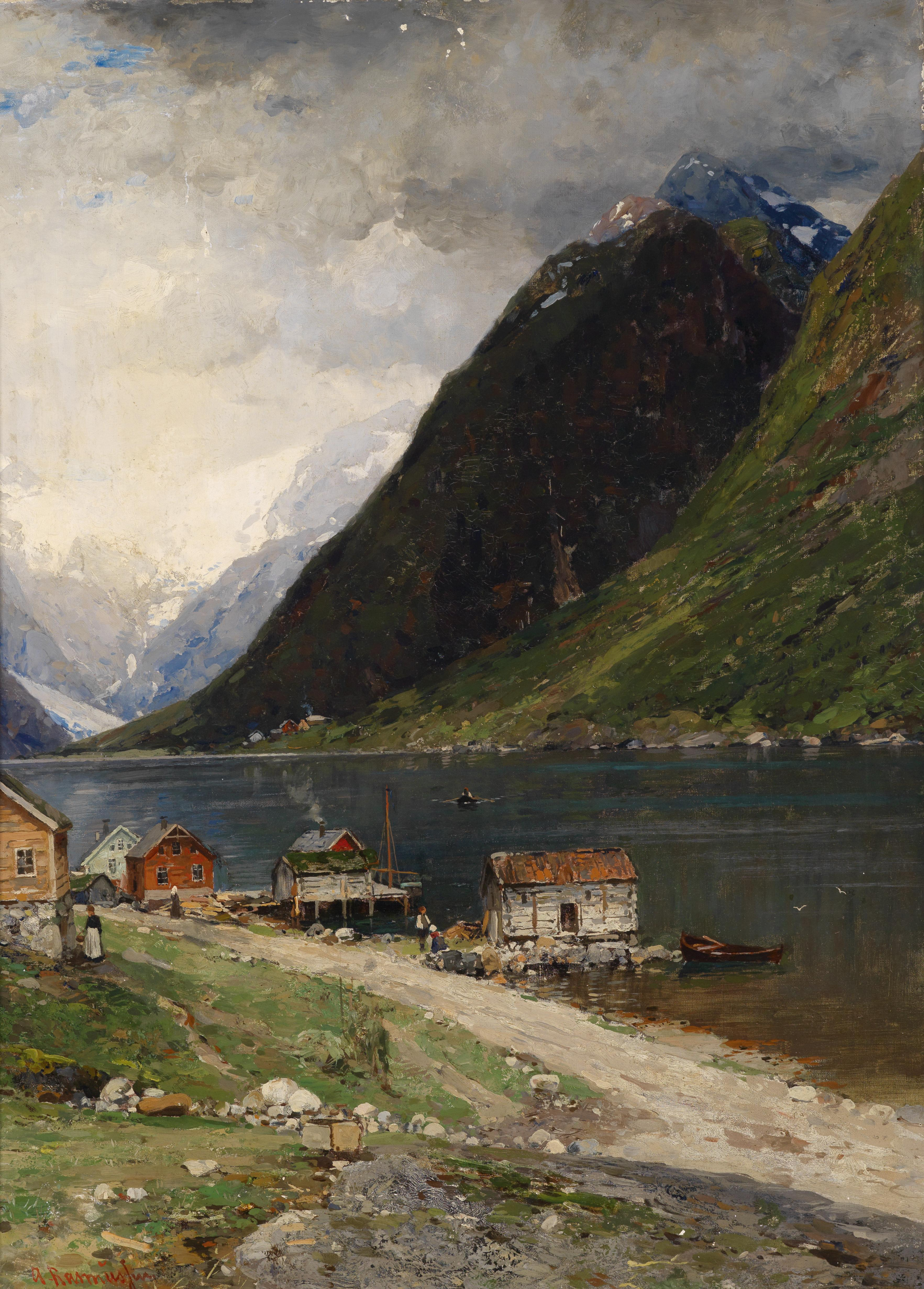
Fjord Landscape

Georg Anton Rasmussen (7 August 1842, in Stavanger – 23 October 1914, in Berlin) was a Norwegian landscape painter who spent most of his career in Germany.

== Biography ==
He began his artistic education in Bergen, where he studied with Johan Ludvig Losting and Anders Askevold. In 1863, he went to Copenhagen to study with Frederik Rohde and take classes at the Royal Danish Academy of Fine Arts. From 1864 to 1867, he completed his studies at the Kunstakademie Düsseldorf, in the Kingdom of Prussia, with Oswald Achenbach and was influenced by the works of Hans Gude. After completing his studies, he remained in Düsseldorf.

From 1868 to 1900, he was a member of Malkasten, a local artists' association. The variety of his landscapes diminished after 1870, when he began devoting himself almost entirely to fjords. This was probably in response to the preferences of the tourist trade. They were especially popular in Germany. In 1899 he moved to Berlin, but returned to Norway every summer to sell his paintings. After 1900, he turned to painting with a palette knife and brightened his colors, in imitation of Adelsteen Normann.

His paintings always included foregrounds with people and boats; occasionally houses. Many of his works were copied and sold as prints. Some art historians maintain that he would be better known today if he had become a member of the Berlin Secession.

His works may be seen at the National Gallery of Denmark, the Deutschen Schifffahrtsmuseum in Bremerhaven, the Gemäldegalerie Dresden and the Kunstmuseum Düsseldorf. A large number of his paintings are held in storage by the Bergen Museum of Art & Science.
