= Niels Simonsen =

Danish artist

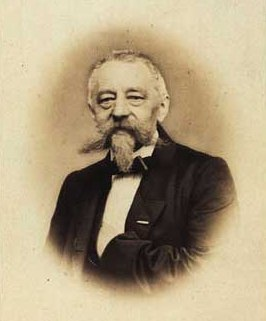
- Photograph by Moritz Unna, late 1860s
- Born: 10 December 1807; Copenhagen
- Died: 11 December 1885 (aged 78); Frederiksberg
- Resting place: Solbjerg Parkkirkegård
- Education: Royal Danish Academy of Fine Arts
- Known for: Painter and educator
- Movement: Orientalist

Niels Simonsen (10 December 1807 – 11 December 1885) was a Danish painter, lithographer and sculptor.

== Biography ==
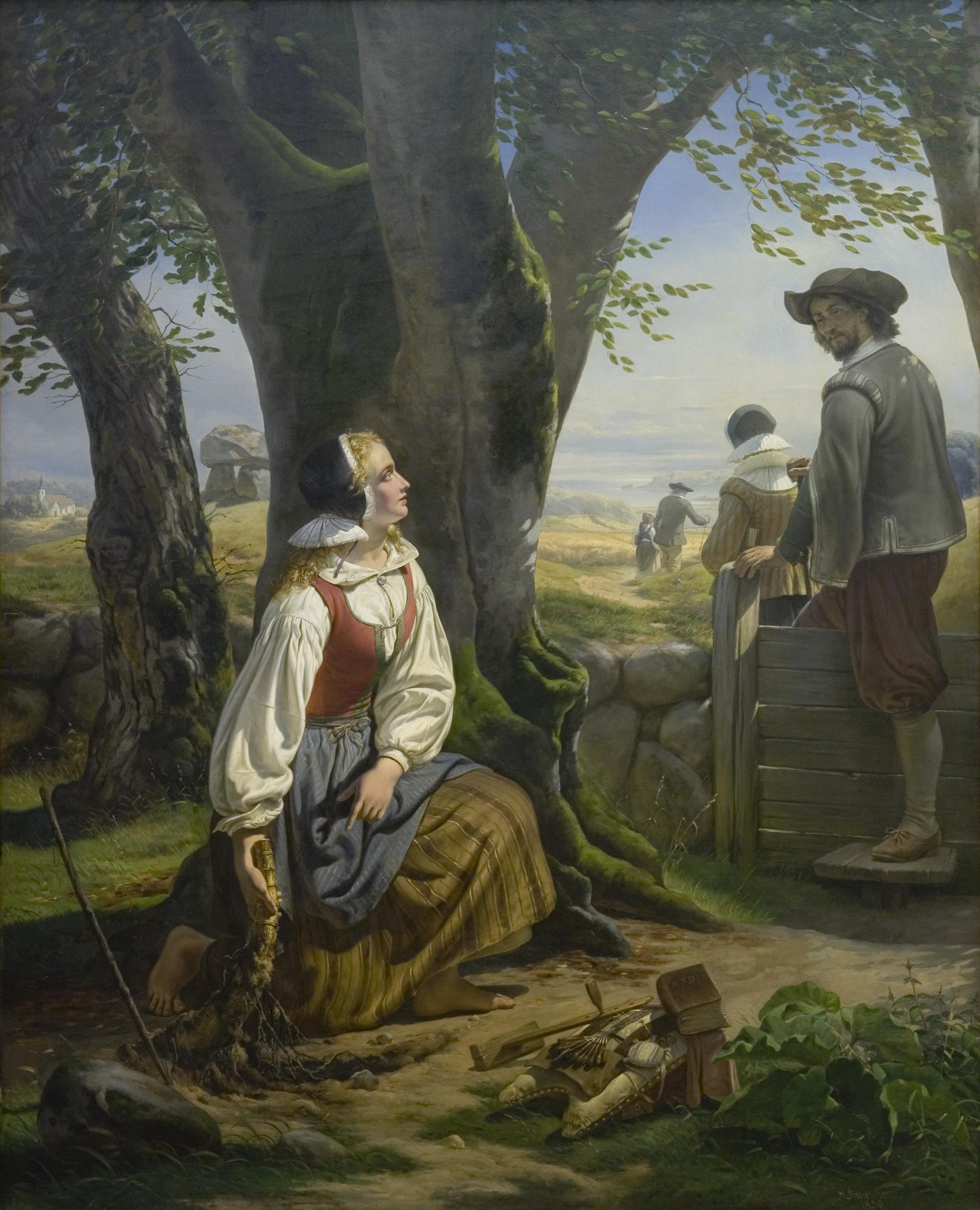
Kirsten Svendsdatter finds the Golden Horn (1859)

Simonsen was born in Copenhagen, Denmark. He was the son of Simnon Rasmusson and Bolette Nielsdatter. His parents were shopkeepers. At the age of fourteen, he was apprenticed to a master decorative painter and began to take drawing lessons at the Royal Danish Academy of Fine Arts. Later, he took private lessons from Johan Ludwig Lund.

After a successful showing at the Charlottenborg Spring Exhibition in 1827, he turned to sculpture and received some orders, including one for reliefs in a hall at Christiansborg. In 1830, he was awarded a gold medal for his relief of Christ healing the sick, which is now displayed at Kongens Nytorv public square in Copenhagen.

Although the fees for these commissions were substantial, portrait busts were his primary source of income. His failure to win any more official recognition for his work soon prompted him to turn to painting. He held his first exhibition in 1833, after some very brief training. His painting of a wounded soldier brought him some prize money and was quickly purchased. It was later widely reproduced; notably in an engraving by printmaker Carl Edvard Sonne.

By 1834, having failed to reproduce this initial success, he requested a loan from Privy Councilor Nicolai Abraham Holten, who had recently bought an altarpiece Simonsen had been unable to sell after those who ordered it changed their minds. The loan was given and it enabled him to spend two years in Munich, where he came under the influence of the Academy of Fine Arts.

He soon found buyers for his work; landowners and businessmen as well as foreign art collectors. By 1837, he was sufficiently well-off to send home for his fiancée, Anne Marie Petersen, and get married. Over the next few years, he traveled to Tyrol, Northern Italy and Algiers. The resulting works were purchased by the royal families of Bavaria and Württemberg and the Royal Collection in Copenhagen.

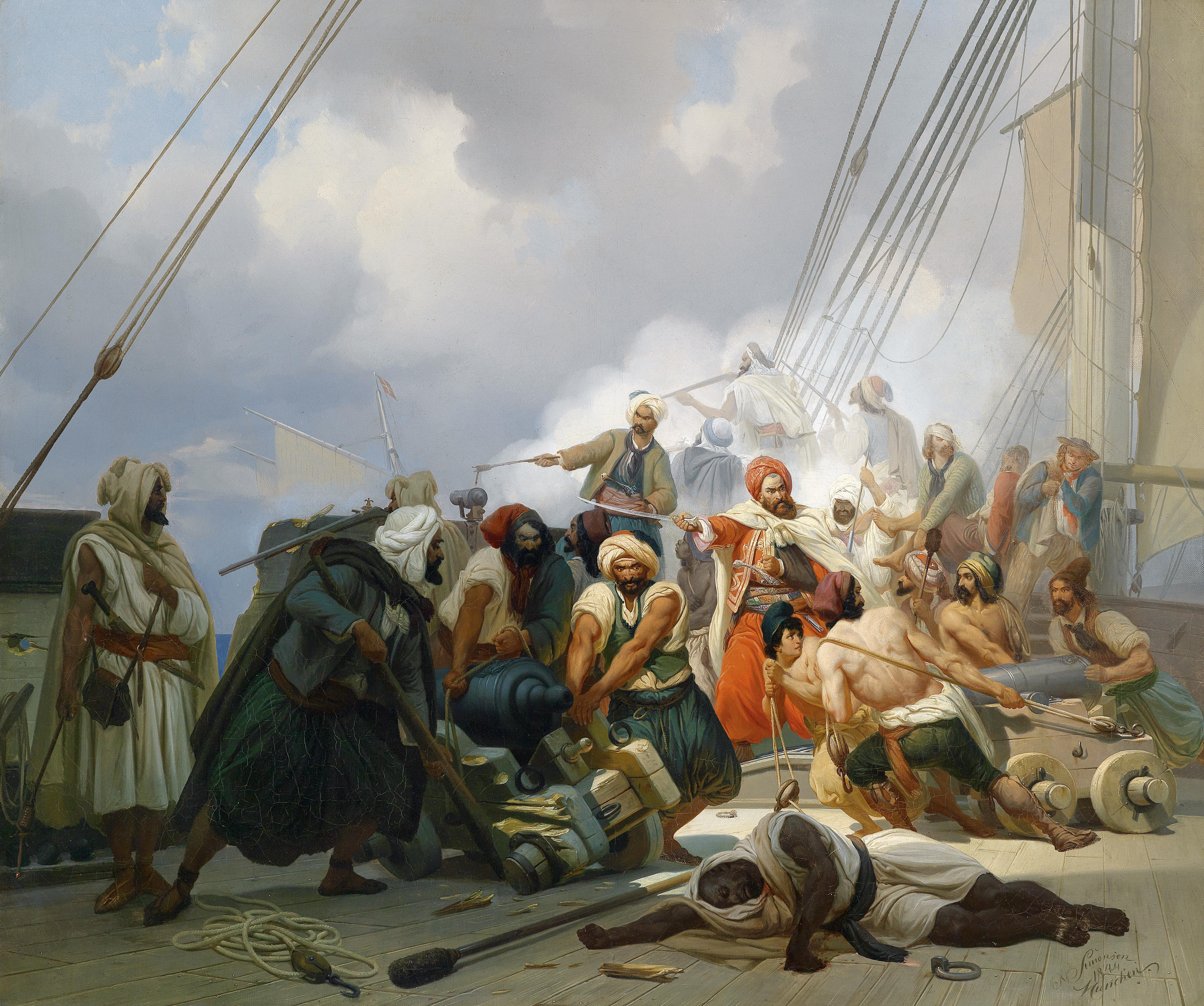
Sea Fight (1844)

=== Return to Denmark ===
In 1842, he became a member of the Munich Academy and was offered a professorship, but chose to take a similar offer from King Christian VIII and returned home; teaching military history painting at the Royal Academy. He also continued with his private career and the works derived from his visit to North Africa were especially popular.

From 1848 to 1851, during the First Schleswig War, he concentrated on large canvases of military scenes, several of which were acquired for the Royal Collection. After that, he went back to genre scenes, took a trip to Sweden and created a major work, Trolovelse i Skaane (1862), symbolizing the reconciliation of Denmark and Sweden after years of bitter contention for Scania.

From 1854 to 1883, he was a teacher at the Academy of Fine Arts' Model School. He once again focused on battle painting during the Second Schleswig War and became a member of the Royal Swedish Academy of Arts. He made his last major trip abroad (to Rome) with money from Det anckerske Legat which had been founded in 1870 by Carl Ancker.

In 1852, he was named a Knight in the Order of the Dannebrog. In 1874 he received the Dannebrogordenens Hæderstegn. In 1883, he received Det treschowske Legat. Simonsen died in 1885 in Frederiksberg and was buried at Solbjerg Park Cemetery.
