= Oldenswort =

Oldenswort Oldensvort
- Municipality
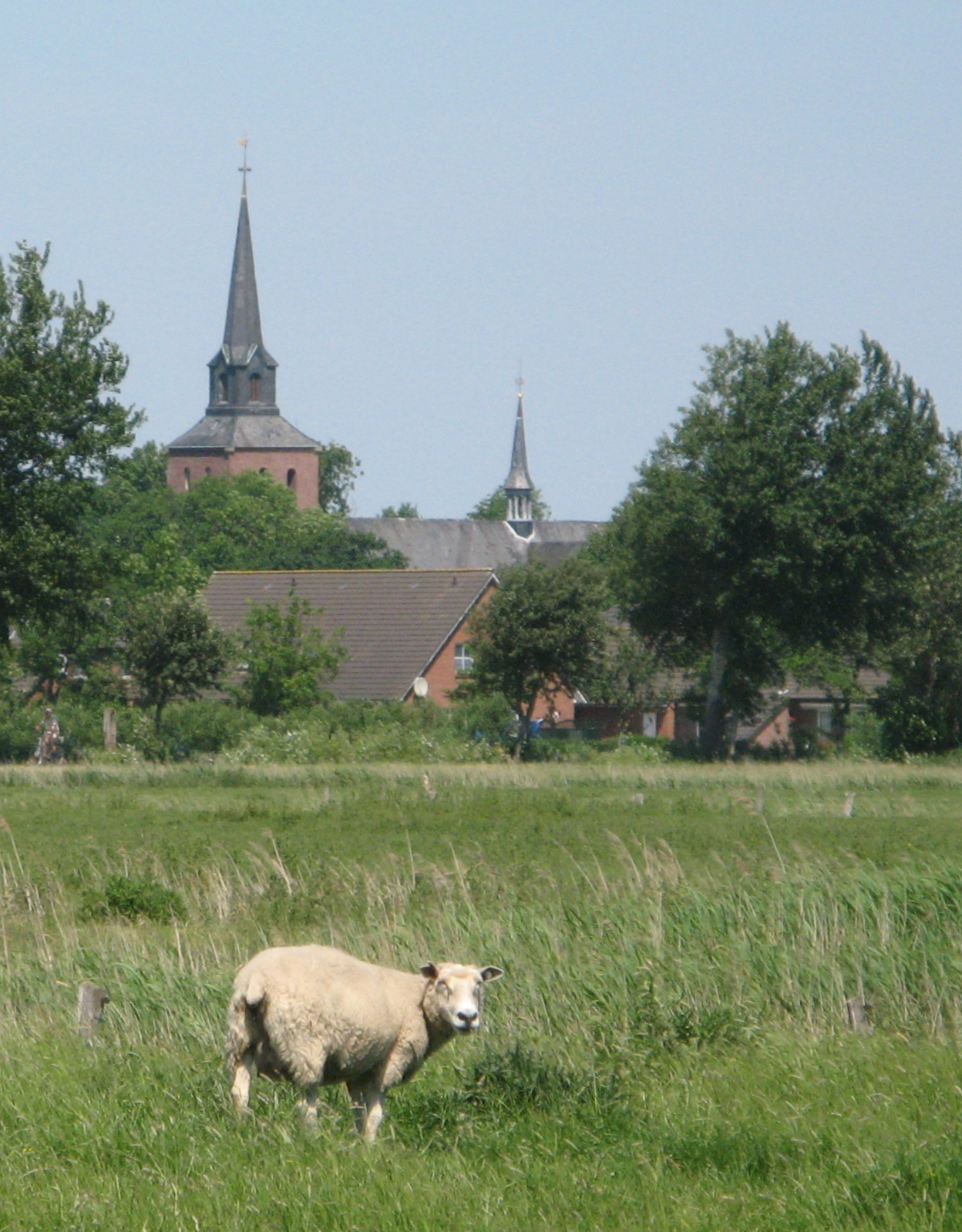

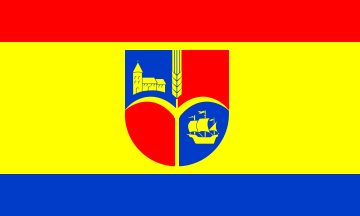
- Flag Coat of arms

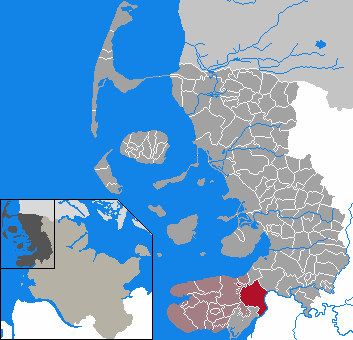
- Location of Oldenswort; Oldensvort within Nordfriesland district
- Interactive map of Oldenswort; Oldensvort
- Location within Germany Location within Schleswig-Holstein
- Coordinates: 54°22′N 8°55′E
- Country: Germany
- State: Schleswig-Holstein
- District: Nordfriesland

Government
  - Mayor: Frank-Michael Tranzer (SPD)

Area
  - Total: 45.84 km^{2} (17.70 sq mi)
- Elevation: 0 m (0 ft)

Population (2025-12-31)
  - Total: 1,286
  - Density: 28.05/km^{2} (72.66/sq mi)
- Time zone: UTC+01:00 (CET)
  - Summer (DST): UTC+02:00 (CEST)
- Postal codes: 25870
- Dialling codes: 04864
- Vehicle registration: NF

Oldenswort (German pronunciation: [ˈɔldn̩sˌvɔʁt]; Danish: Oldensvort) is a municipality in the district of Nordfriesland, in Schleswig-Holstein, Germany, next to the river Eider.

== Personalities ==
The earliest atheist known by name in modern Europe, Matthias Knutzen, was born here sometime in early 1646. The founder of German sociology, Ferdinand Tönnies (1855-1936), was born here. A memorial of him was unveiled in 1990.

== Other notable natives of Oldenswort ==
- Johan Samuel Augustin (1715–1785) German-Danish astronomical writer and civil servant

== See also ==
- Eiderstedt peninsula
