= Erling Eckersberg =

Danish printmaker (1808–1889)

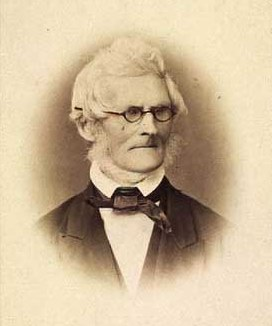
Erling Eckersberg by Budtz Müller & Co

Erling Eckersberg (15 September 1808 – 27 November 1889) was a Danish printmaker.

== Early life and education ==
Eckersberg was born on 15 September 1808 in Copenhagen, the son of Christoffer Wilhelm Eckersberg and Christine Rebekka Hyssing. His parents divorced when he was small. In 1812–15, while his father went on a study trip abroad, he was placed in the foster care of printmaker Oluf Olufsen Bagge and his wife Karen.

Eckersberg initially trained as an artist under his father and attended the Royal Danish Academy of Fine Arts in 1826–33. He was also trained as a printmaker privately by O.O. Bagge. He won the academy's small silver medal in 1831 and its large gold medal in 1833. In 1834–38, he continued his training as a printmaker under J.M. Leroux and H.C. Müller in Paris and Paolo Toschi in Parma.

== Career ==
Back in Denmark, Eckersberg settled as a printmaker in Copenhagen, specializing in reproductions of his father's paintings and drawings. He both worked with copperprint engraving, etching and lithography techniques.

== Personal life ==
Exkersberg never married. He died on 27 November 1889 and is buried in Assistens Cemetery.
