= Johanne Stockmarr =

Danish painter

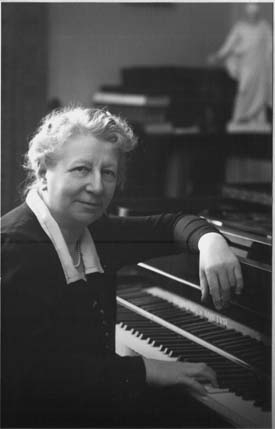
Johanne Stockmarr

Johanne Amalie Stockmarr (1869–1944) was a Danish pianist who was recognized for her virtuosity in Denmark, Britain, Germany, Sweden and Norway, receiving several awards. One of her most notable concerts was in 1906 in London when she played Grieg's Piano Concerto under the composer's leadership.

== Biography ==
Born on 21 April 1869 in Copenhagen, Stockmarr was the daughter of the violinist Ferdinand Tycho Nicolai Stockmarr (1835–84) and Ane Emilie Raun (1842–1911). She was born into a well established family of musicians, including an uncle and two of her cousins, all of whom encouraged her to play the piano. In 1885, she began studying at the Royal Danish Academy of Music under Edvard Helsted. After appearing in a concert at the Casino Theatre in 1889, she received a grant which enabled her to continue her studies in Paris under the pianist Henri Fissot (1843–96). On her return to Copenhagen, she completed her studies under Franz Neruda.

With Neruda conducting, from 1892 she appeared in a number of concerts in Copenhagen, notably at the Musikforeningen in 1898 where she played Tchaikovsky's Second Piano Concerto. She went on to perform more widely in Scandinavia, England and Germany, often together with Neruda's sister, the violinist Wilhelmine Neruda who lived in London where she was known as Lady Hallé. Hallé introduced her to Queen Alexandra, whom she played for when she visited Denmark. Back in London, she established a close relationship with Alexandra, playing four-handed pieces with her. She was also the piano teacher of Queen Alexandrine and Princess Dagmar.

In 1906 in Queen's Hall, London, Stockmarr played Grieg's Piano Concerto with Grieg conducting. She performed pieces by Grieg increasingly frequently, playing his music every night for a week for BBC broadcasts in 1928. In 1943, on the occasion of Grieg's 100th anniversary, she played his piano concerto in Tivolis Koncertsal.

Johanne Stockmarr died on 2 March 1944 and is buried at the Assistens Cemetery in Copenhagen.

== Awards ==
Stockmarr received a number of honours and awards. In 1909, she was given the title Court Pianist (hofpianist), in 1918 she received the Ingenio et Arti medal and in 1939 the Royal Medal of Recompense in gold. She was the third person to be awarded the Stipendium of Honour from the Kulturelle Fond.
