= Gabriel Wagner =

German philosopher (c.1660–c.1717)

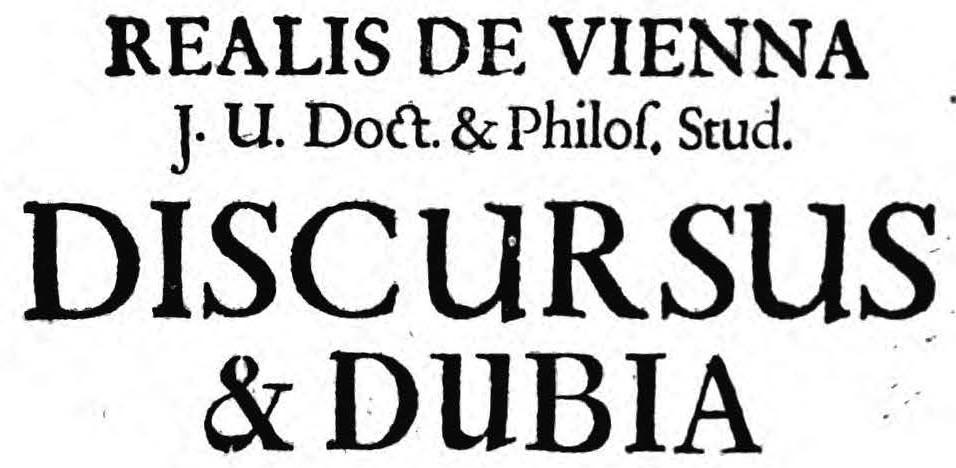
- First page of Wagner's "Discourse and doubts," published in 1691
- Born: c. 1660; Quedlinburg, Holy Roman Empire
- Died: c. 1717; Göttingen, Electorate of Hanover, Holy Roman Empire

Philosophical work
- Era: Early modern philosophy
- Region: Western philosophy
- School: Spinozism; Materialism; Cartesianism; Rationalism
- Main interests: Metaphysics, education

Gabriel Wagner (c. 1660 – c. 1717) was a radical German philosopher and materialist who wrote under the nom-de-plume Realis de Vienna. A follower of Spinoza and acquaintance of Leibniz, Wagner did not believe that the universe or bible were divine creations, and sought to extricate philosophy and science from the influence of theology. Wagner also held radical political views critical of the nobility and monarchy. After failing to establish lasting careers in cities throughout German-speaking Europe, Wagner died in or shortly after 1717.

== Life ==
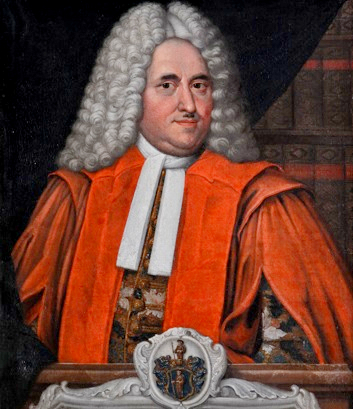
Christian Thomasius, an early mentor and later opponent of Wagner.

Wagner studied under scholar Christian Thomasius in Leipzig, and in 1691 published a philosophical tract critical of Thomasius, "Discourse and doubts in Christ: a Thomasian introduction to courtly philosophy." The tract satirically dubbed Thomasius the "German Socrates" and attracted attention within philosophical circles, including from Leibniz, who sought to contact Wagner. In the same year, after a dispute over rent, Wagner was expelled from university and imprisoned. Following his release, Wagner traveled in 1693 to Halle, where as a result of his increasingly libertine views he wholly broke with Thomasius, who by contrast was becoming more conservative. Moving to Berlin later in 1693 and then to Vienna, Wagner was in 1696 given a temporary position in Hamburg, which he lost due to his novel and sometimes polemical philosophical positions.

Receiving support from Leibniz, Wagner worked for a time at the Herzog August Library in Wolfenbüttel; and maintained his contact with Leibniz. Leibniz wrote to Wagner in 1696, describing his admiration for Aristotle and opposing contemporary attacks on him, despite his view that Aristotle had discovered only a small portion of the discipline.

Opposing his former mentor Thomasius' belief in the soul, Wagner published another text in 1707, "Critique of Thomasian views on the nature of the soul." Theologian Johann Joachim Lange accused Wagner of Spinozist sympathies in 1710, and Wagner replied to these criticisms in the same year.

The last record of Wagner is found in Göttingen in 1717, where he came into conflict with historian of philosophy Christoph August Heumann. Wagner presumably died shortly thereafter.

== Philosophy ==
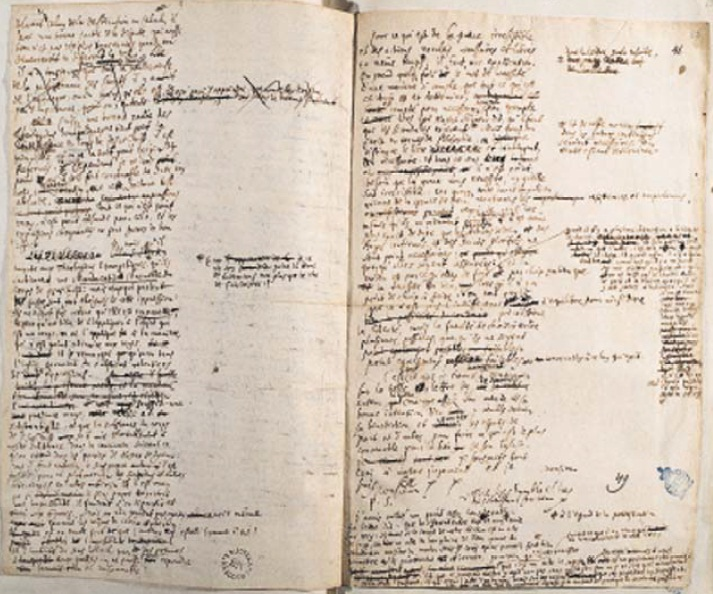
Correspondence of Leibniz, who maintained contact with Wagner for much of his life.

Wagner believed that both education and philosophy should be modernized and focus on mathematics, physics and medicine, but not theology. In this regard he held that Germany had made more progress, while French, Italian and Spanish thinkers were overly influenced by followers of Aristotle, Galen and Ptolemy. Believing in intellectual freedom, Wagner was an admirer of German philosopher and professor Nicolaus Hieronymus Gundling, who favored "atheistic" classical Greek philosophy.

As articulated in his 1707 critique of Thomasius, Wagner did not believe in a soul, in divine providence, in the divinity of the bible, or in divine creation. He instead advocated reason, the most "godly" aspect of humankind, as a means of eradicating superstition. Wagner therefore celebrated advances in science facilitated by Descartes and even considered himself a Cartesian, though he disagreed with the latter's Christian metaphysical beliefs and even sought to undermine them. Deeply influenced by Spinoza, Wagner placed even greater emphasis on the importance of experimentation and empiricism in developing knowledge.

Wagner held radical political beliefs, advocating a restructuring of society according to more egalitarian principles and advocating greater emphasis on administration, education and culture. Reform of educational institutions was a particular concern of his writing. Wagner contested that aristocracy by birth was inferior to intellectual achievement. He also believed that Germany's fragmentary political system resulted in a weak and mismanaged government. In these beliefs Wagner was influenced by but disagreed with political thinkers such as Hugo Grotius, Thomas Hobbes and Niccolò Machiavelli. Much of Wagner's political and philosophical system was oriented, ultimately, towards securing religious, intellectual, and personal freedom, a project of the Enlightenment as a whole.

== Legacy ==
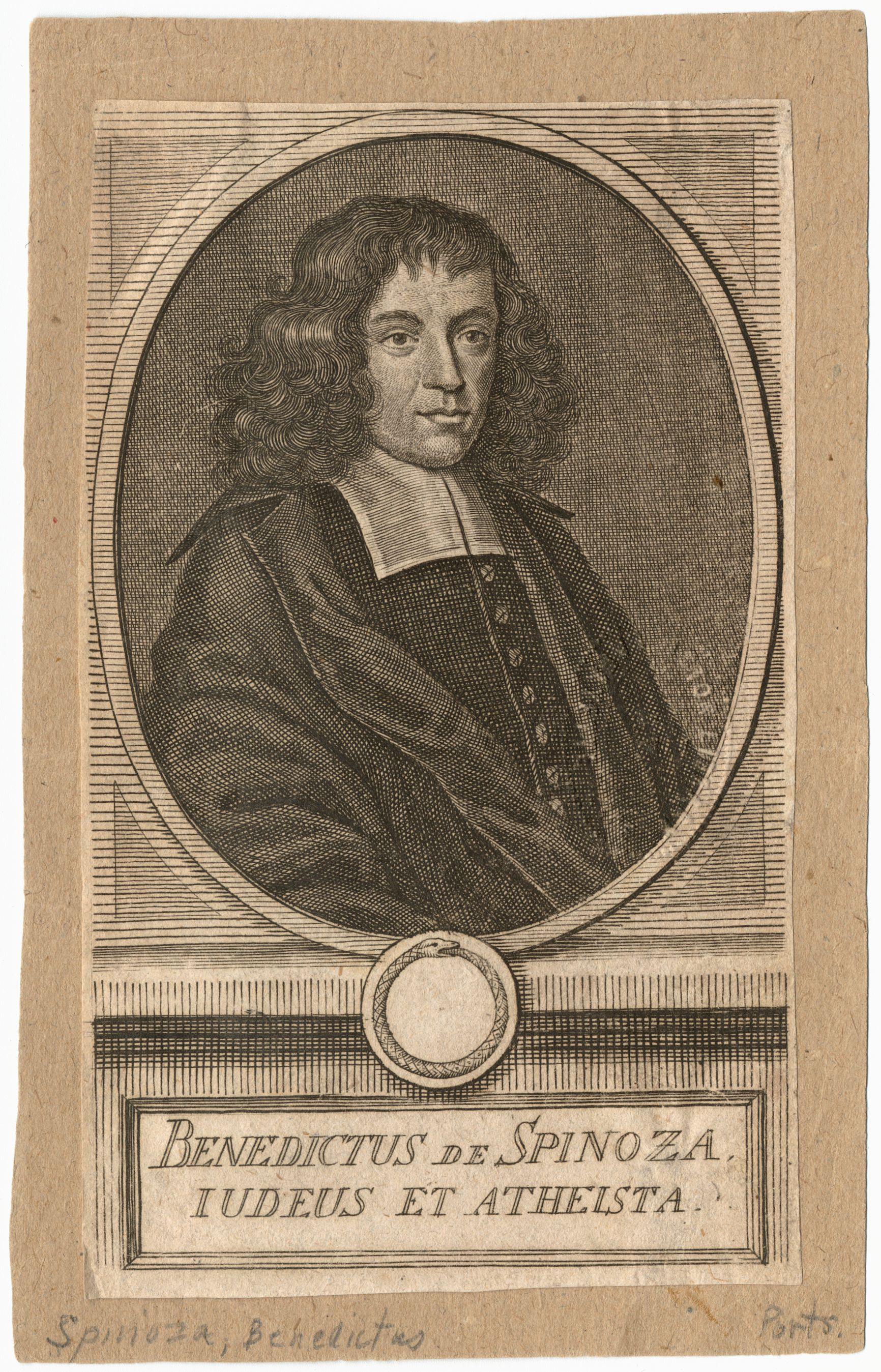
An early engraving of the philosopher Spinoza, a major influence on Wagner's world view.

Wagner is known for his longstanding correspondence with Leibniz, and his erudition and innovative understanding of philosophy and natural sciences during his time, according to historian Cornelio Fabro.

Historian Jonathan Israel writes that Wagner is an important materialist philosopher of the late 17th and early 18th centuries, and an example of both radical philosophy and atheism produced by the growing university system of the period. Historian Frederick Beiser writes that Wagner and his fellow materialists in Germany, though they were less numerous than those found in France and England, developed mechanistic explanations for human behavior and raised fears of spreading religious skepticism.

== See also ==
- Matthias Knutzen

== Sources ==
- Beiser, Frederick (2000). "Chapter 2: The Enlightenment and idealism". In Ameriks, Karl (ed.). The Cambridge Companion to German Idealism. Cambridge University Press. ISBN 9780521656955.
- Cassirer, Ernst (July 1943). "Newton and Leibniz". The Philosophical Review. 52 (4): 366–391. doi:10.2307/2180670. JSTOR 2180670.
- Dascal, Marcelo (2008). G.W. Leibniz: The Art of Controversies. Springer. ISBN 9781402052286.
- Erdmann, Johann (1890). A History of Philosophy: Modern philosophy. S. Sonnenschein.
- Fabro, Cornelio (1968). God in exile: modern atheism: a study of the internal dynamic of modern atheism, from its roots in the Cartesian cogito to the present day. Newman Press.
- Israel, Jonathan (2007). "Chapter 1: Enlightenment, Radical Enlightenment and the 'Medical Revolution' of the late Seventeenth and Eighteenth Centuries". In Grell, Ole; Cunningham, Andrew (eds.). Medicine and Religion in Enlightenment Europe. Ashgate Publishing, Ltd. ISBN 9780754656388.
- Israel, Jonathan (2006). Enlightenment Contested. Oxford University Press. ISBN 9780199279227.
- Poser, Hans (2004). Antonio Carrara; Antonio María Nunziante; Gabriele Tomasi (eds.). Individuals, Minds and Bodies: Themes from Leibniz. Franz Steiner Verlag. ISBN 9783515083423.
- Wagner, Gabriel (1691). Discursus et dubia in Christ. Thomasii introductionem ad philosophiam aulicam.
