= Johan Samuel Augustin =

Johan Samuel Augustin (March 31, 1715 – April 26, 1785) was a German-Danish astronomical writer and civil servant.

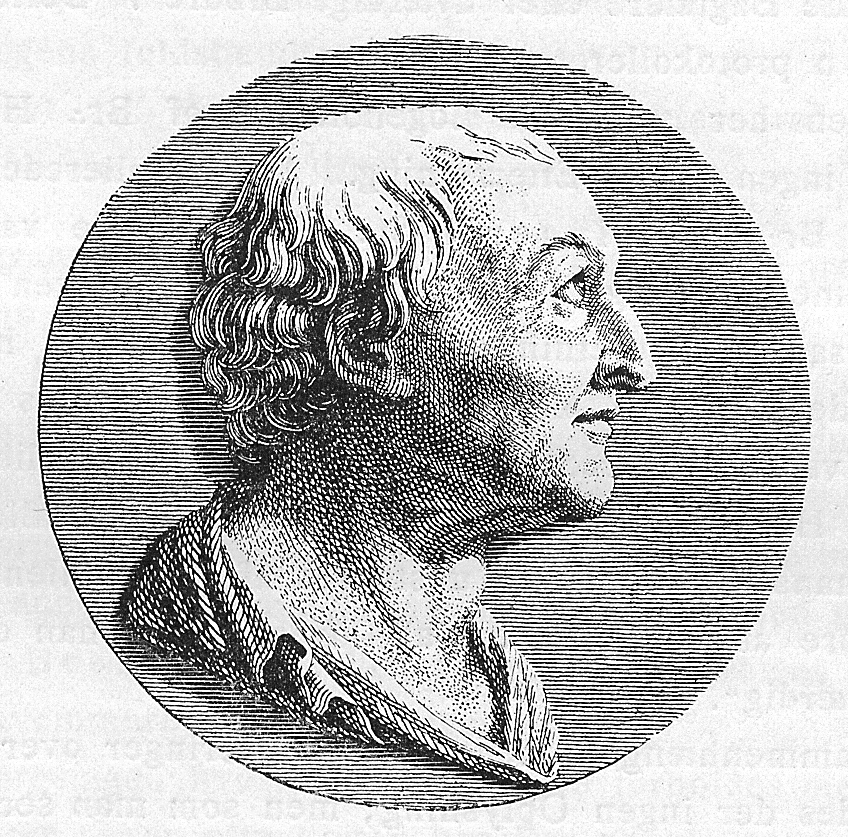
Portrait of Johann Samuel Augustin

== Life ==
Johan Samuel Augustin was born in Oldenswort in Eiderstedt to an old Frisian family. When he was 2 years old his father, John. Sam. Augustin, died and was allowed by his uncle and legal guardian, Corniels Bischoff of Tetenbøl, to stay with his other uncle, Steffens Augustin, who also lived in Oldenswort. After leaving school he studied at the universities of Kiel, Jena and Leipzig. He intended to study law, but he ended up accepting a job as an information clerk.

At Friedrich Wiedeburg in Leipzig, he acquired a taste for mathematics and astronomy, which he would later study with great zeal, and acquired a large library and an instrument collection (Catalogue ed. Of Erichsen). He also worked with a company involved in the release of the print Peder Paars by Johan Frederik Clemens.

In 1750, he was employed as a secretary of the War Chancellery in Copenhagen, and was promoted to the First Secretary in 1757. The Royal Danish Academy of Sciences had him listed as a member in 1775. On March 21, 1781, he became a member of the Royal Danish Society of Homeland History. He died in Copenhagen unmarried as Councillor and was the first of many influential people to be buried at the Assistens Cemetery in Copenhagen (Before his burial it was a graveyard for the poor, not for influential people). His portrait is in the catalog of his collection.

== Works ==
In addition to some translations from German, he wrote: Briefe des Joaber Adaders aus der Sonne an Pyrophilus auf diet that Pyrophilaner (Published first in 1748). Moreover, as the 12th part of the Academy of Sciences writings: Om Forskjellen imellem Tycho Brahes og Picards Meridian af Uranienborg and Adskillige Steders Længde og Bredde i Norge. In 1781 and 1782 he gave several lectures: Om Tycho Brahes skrevne Observationer og deres Skæbne and Om Vejrligets besynderlige Forandringer i Januar 1782 though these were not published in print.

== Sources ==
- Holger Ehrencron-Müller, Forfatterlexikon comprising Denmark, Norway and Iceland until 1814
- Lahde, Memorials, first booklet.
- Charles Louis Tørrisen Bugge, Danish Frimureries History, Volume 1, Copenhagen, 1910. p 155 f
