= Matthias Knutzen =

German writer regarded as the first western atheist

Matthias Knutzen (also Knuzen, Knutsen; 1646 – after 1674) was a German critic of religion and the author of three atheistic pamphlets. In modern Western history, he is the first self-professed atheist known by name. Knutzen was called "The only person on record who openly professed and taught atheism" in the 1789 Student's Pocket Dictionary by Thomas Mortimer.

== Life ==
Matthias Knutzen was born at Oldenswort (Schleswig-Holstein) early in 1646. His parents were Berend Knutzen, organist in Oldenswort and his wife Elisabeth (Elsebe). In the same year Knutzen was born his father died. As a boy, Knutzen was sent to his brother Johann Knutzen, an organist in Königsberg in East Prussia, and attended there a secondary school (the Altstädtisches Gymnasium) from 1661 to 1664. In 1664, he registered at the University of Königsberg and in 1668, at the University of Copenhagen, to study theology in its Lutheran seminary. In between he earned money as a private tutor. In 1673, he took a position as a village schoolteacher and auxiliary Protestant preacher in the Kremper Marsch (Schleswig-Holstein). However, he was dismissed at the end of 1673 because he had criticised ecclesiastical authorities in his sermons. In February 1674 he went to Rome and in September 1674 to Jena (Thuringia). There, Knutzen distributed handwritten atheistic pamphlets. The town and the University of Jena carried out an investigation. In order not to be arrested, Knutzen went first to Coburg and then to Altdorf near Nuremberg. On 22 October 1674, he was last seen in Jena. Then, all track of him is lost. The author Johannes Moller wrote in his biography of North German writers, Cimbria Literata (1744), that Knutzen had died in an Italian monastery, but that may have been an invention to discredit both Knutzen and the Roman Catholic church.

== Teachings ==
In his three pamphlets of 1674, Knutzen claimed that there was a sect or community called the Gewissener or "Conscientarians" (i.e., 'the conscience people'). According to him, the Conscientarians had adherents in Hamburg, Jena, Paris, Amsterdam, and Rome, and, allegedly, more than 700 in Jena alone. This claim, however, is regarded as a fiction and the teachings which Knutzen spread as an alleged member of the Conscientarians were in fact his own.

According to Knutzen, there are no transcendent entities such as God, the devil, or immortal souls, the Bible is implausible due to its many contradictions, and the guidelines for human behavior should be reason and conscience. Therefore, both secular and ecclesiastical authorities are superfluous. In his Latin letter Amicus Amicis Amica! Knutzen summarizes his beliefs as:

Insuper Deum negamus, Magistratum ex alto despicimus, Templa quoque cum omnibus Sacerdotibus rejicientes.
Moreover, we deny God, we despise authorities from above and we reject the churches together with all ministers.

For Knutzen, the uppermost rule was: "Live honestly, do not harm anybody and give everybody what they deserve." (in Latin, Honeste vivere, neminem laedere, suum cuique tribuere), an old Roman legal principle according to Ulpian.

== Sources and reception ==
Knutzen was inspired by Socinianism. Other influences (e.g., Spinoza) are difficult to discern and are disputed. However, it can be shown that Knutzen was well-versed in the philosophical literature of his day even when it came to insignificant details.

Knutzen's views provoked the violent rejection of ecclesiastical authors. In 1677, for example, the German theologian Tobias Pfanner claimed that Knutzen's work surpassed the infamy of all enemies of religion known until then. Pierre Bayle included Knutzen in his Dictionnaire historique et critique (first edition in 1697, further editions throughout the 18th century). Thus, for the philosophers of the Age of Enlightenment, Knutzen became the first modern atheist known by name.

== Works ==
- Epistola amici ad amicum [Latin: Letter of a Friend to a Friend], also under the title Amicus Amicis Amica!, 1674.
- Gespräch zwischen einem Gastgeber und drei Gästen ungleicher Religion [German: Conversation between a Host and three Guests of different Religion], 1674.
- Gespräch zwischen einem Feldprediger namens Dr. Heinrich Brummern und einem lateinischen Musterschreiber [German: Conversation between an Army Chaplain called Dr Heinrich Brummern and a Latin Pattern-Writer], 1674.

== See also ==
- Gabriel Wagner

== Sources ==
- M. Knutzen, ein deutscher Atheist und revolutionärer Demokrat des 17. Jahrhunderts. Flugschriften und zeitgenössische sozialkritische Schriften, ed. and prefaced by Werner Pfoh. Berlin: Akademie-Verlag 1965.
- Matthias Knutzen: Schriften und Materialien, ed. by Winfried Schröder. (Philosophische Clandestina der deutschen Aufklärung. Texte und Dokumente / Philosophische Clandestina der deutschen Aufklärung Abteilung I: Texte und Dokumente). Stuttgart: Frommann-Holzboog 2010.
