= Frederik Rohde =

Danish painter (1816–1886)

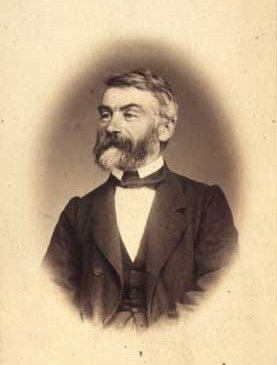
Frederik Rohde, by Moritz Unna (1860s)

Niels Frederik Martin Rohde (27 May 1816, Copenhagen - 14 July 1886, Frederiksberg) was a Danish landscape painter.

== Biography ==
He was the son of Peder Rohde, an accountant in the probate court, and his wife, Johanne née Holm. After his confirmation, he enrolled at the Royal Danish Academy of Fine Arts. While there, he began taking private lessons from J.L. Lund. He also sought professional advice from Heinrich Buntzen and Christen Købke.

His first exhibit as a landscape painter came in 1835, and attracted much attention. In 1842, this led to a two-year scholarship from the academy. Most of his time was spent in Switzerland and Germany. It was there, in Munich, that he began to focus on landscape painting.

In 1852, he became an Agré (candidate for membership) at the academy. That same year, he married Emilie Johanne Caroline Brusch; the daughter of C. F. Brusch, a restaurateur.

He had produced his candidate painting for consideration by the membership committee but, in 1857, before it could be presented, the academy changed its rules and he never became a member.

By this time, he had come to specialize in winter scenes, inspired by trips to Southern Sweden. most of which are in private collections. Although this was financially remunerative, the repetitious design and mood made them increasingly unpopular at exhibitions. He was, however, personally popular and served as a member of the board at the Kunstforeningen for many years. In 1863, he took his second trip abroad with a stipend from the Anckerske Scholarship. He also visited Paris, in 1866.

== Selected paintings ==
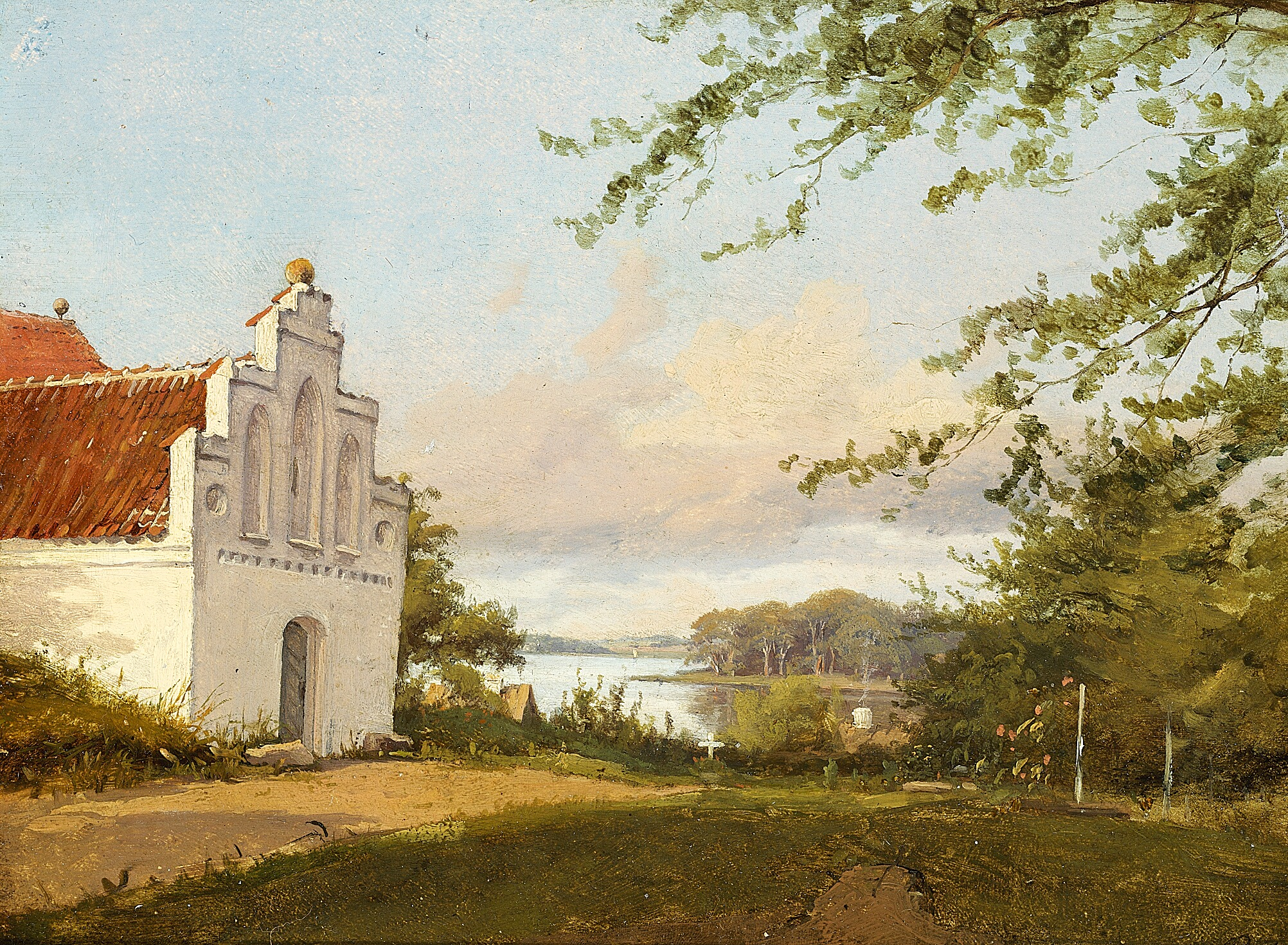
Village Church by a Fjord

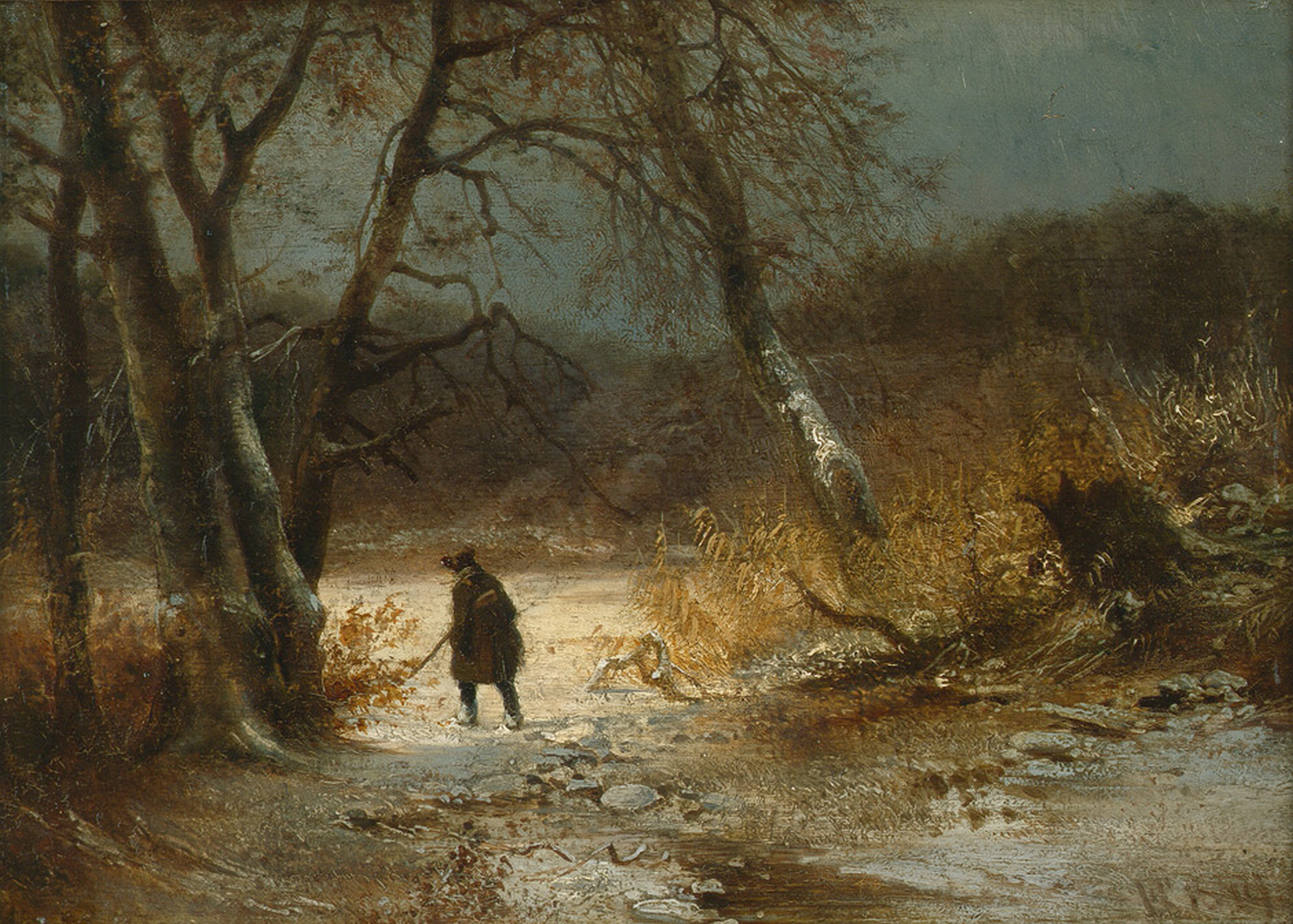
Lonely Wanderer in a
Winter Landscape

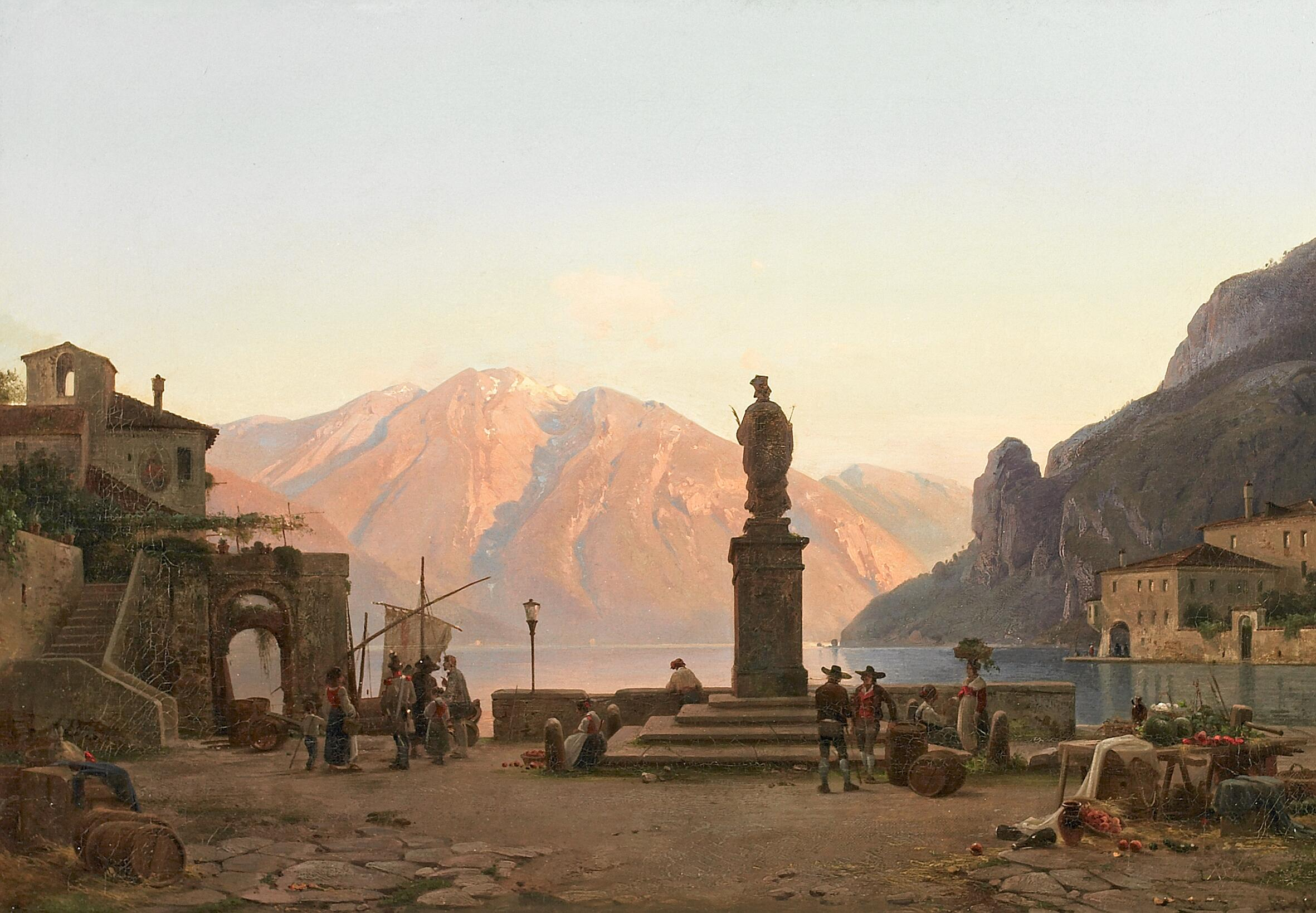
The Square in Riva on Lake Garda

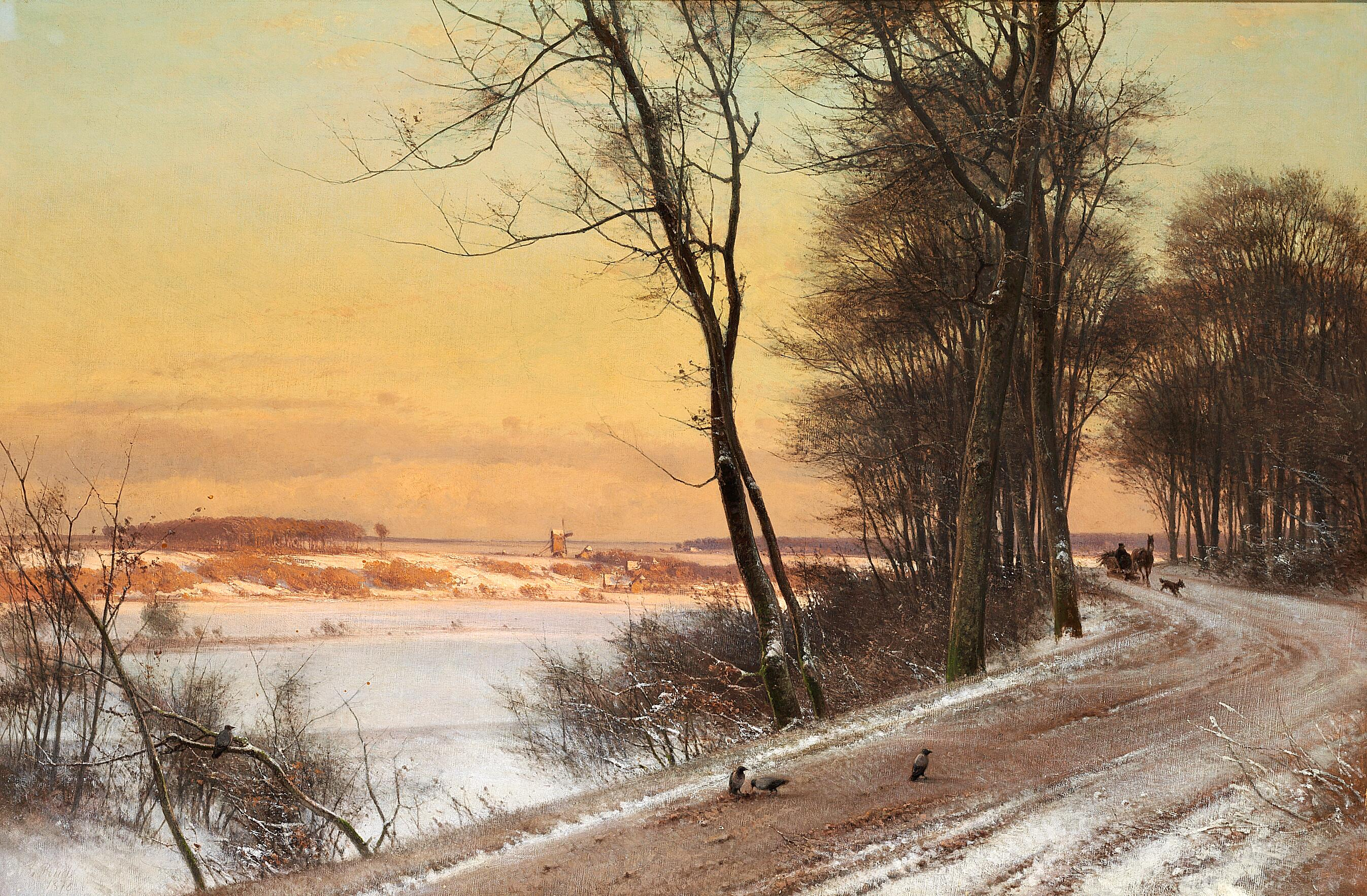
Winter Landscape with a Sled
