= Franz Nachtegall =

Danish gymnastics teacher (1777–1847)

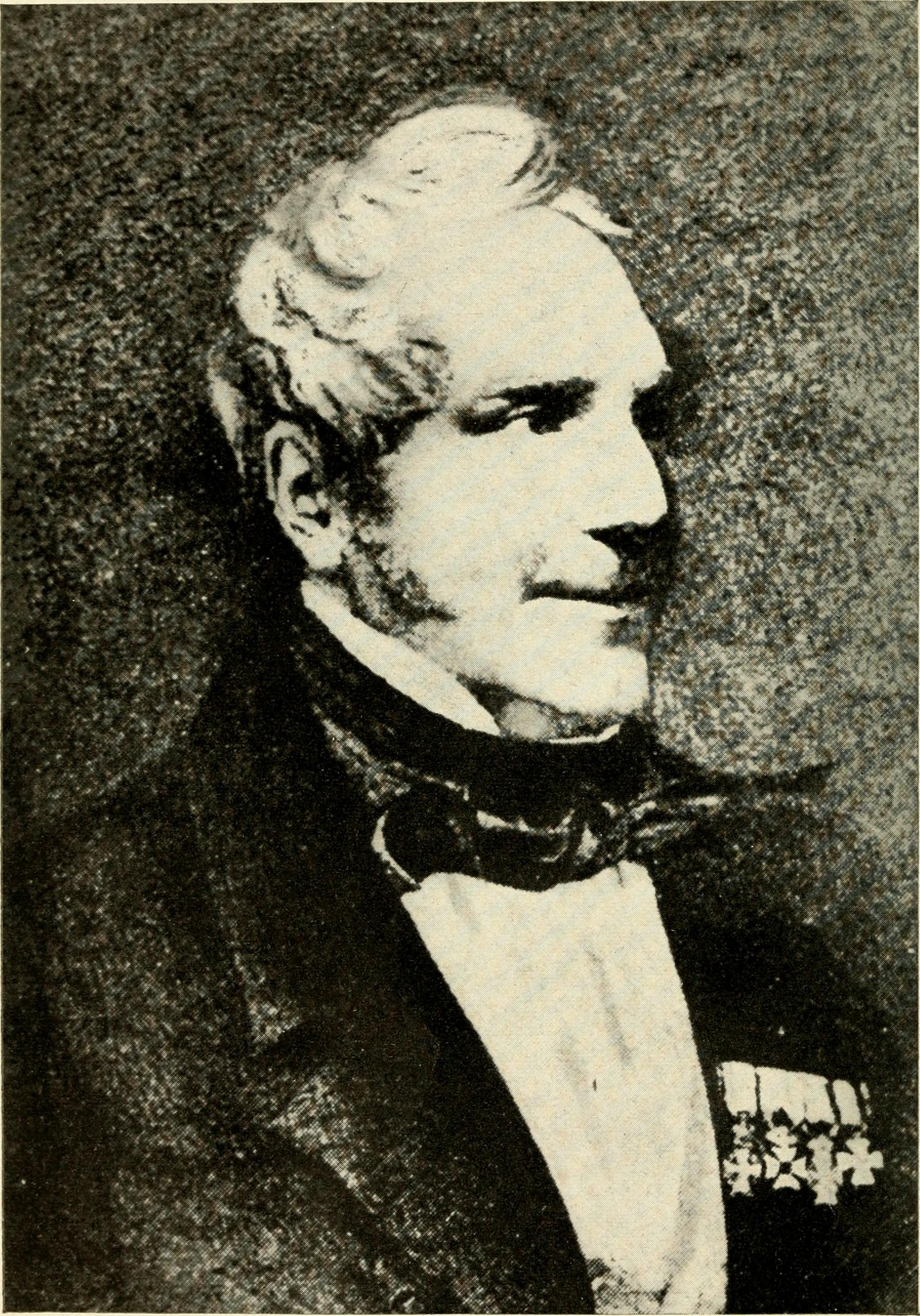
Franz Nachtegall

Vivat Victorius Fridericus Franciscus "Franz" Nachtegall (October 3, 1777 – 12 May 1847) was an early proponent and directly responsible for introducing physical education in schools of Denmark.

He was born in Copenhagen on October 3, 1777. He took lessons of fencing and vaulting in childhood.

Nachtegall was apparently stimulated to begin teaching gymnastics after reading the GutsMuths manual of gymnastics. In 1799 he was invited to teach gymnastics at the Vesterbro school.

In 1804 he was appointed as the first director of a training school for the teaching of gymnastics to the army of Denmark. This school provided instructions for future NCOs in both the army and navy. In 1805 he prepared a detailed gymnastic manual for the military course.

In 1807 he was appointed professor of gymnastics at Copenhagen University. In 1808 he was awarded an honorarium for giving free instructions to civilians, who were interested in teaching physical education.

From 1821 to 1842, Nachtegall was Director of Gymnastics, with oversight of the programs of the army and navy.
