= Marie Zinck =

Danish actress and operatic soprano (1789–1823)

- Born: Marie Elisabeth Thomsen; 1 June 1789; Copenhagen, Denmark
- Died: 6 April 1823 (aged 33); Copenhagen, Denmark
- Occupations: Actress, singer
- Years active: 1803 — 1823
- Spouse: Johan Georg Christophersen Zinck
- Parent(s): Jørgen Thomsen, Louise Elisabeth Eskildsen

Marie Elisabeth Zinck née Thomsen (1789–1823) was a Danish actress and operatic soprano. After initially training at the Royal Danish Ballet school, she made her début at the Royal Danish Theatre as an actress in 1808. Thanks to her pleasant voice, she increasingly performed in plays with musical roles or in operas and operettas, becoming a firm favourite with her audiences. One of her most successful roles was that of Cherubin in The Marriage of Figaro, both in the play by Pierre Beaumarchais and in Mozart's opera. She performed in a wide variety of productions until her death from pneumonia in early 1823, just 33 years old.

== Biography ==
Born on 1 June 1789 in Copenhagen, Marie Elisabeth Thomsen was the daughter of the theatre manager Jørgen Thomsen (c.1753–1825) and Louise Elisabeth née Eskildsen (c.1770–1806). In 1813, she married the opera singer Johan Georg Christophersen Zinck (1788–1828).

In 1803, Thomsen entered the Royal Theatre's ballet school but transferred to the drama school when it was established by Michael Rosing and Knud Lyne Rahbek in September 1805. As a result, she took part in the school's first presentation in the Court Theatre on 11 May 1806 in as a chambermaid in both Den gode Fader and Fruentimmerhævn, attracting considerable applause. After further successful roles at the drama school, she made her début at the Royal Theatre as the chambermaid Lise in August von Kotzebue's Det farlige Naboskab. In May 1810, she was engaged by the theatre as a "royal actress".

Thanks to her attractive looks, her charm and her pleasant if rather weak voice, she increasingly featured in musical works, becoming a favourite of the theatre's young audiences. She is remembered in particular as the star of Nicolas Isouard's Cendrillon (1812). In February 1813, she married the tenor Georg Zinck with whom she had frequently performed in the work. Other successes included the title role in Friedrich Heinrich Himmel's Fanchon (1814) and Cherubin in the works of both Beaumarchais and Mozart. Over the years, she starred in a wide variety of plays, operas and operettas, deftly combining her skills as an actress and a singer. Her last appearance was as Rose in C.E.F. Weyse's Sovedrikken on 18 March 1823.

Marie Zinck died in Copenhagen on 6 April 1823 of pneumonia after singing in a cold church. She is buried in Assistens Cemetery.
