= Moritz Unna =

Danish painter and photographer (1811–1871)

- Born: 31 December 1811; Copenhagen
- Died: 2 December 1871 (aged 59); Copenhagen
- Education: Royal Danish Academy of Fine Arts
- Known for: painting, photography
- Style: Genre
- Spouse: Nanny Fürst (m. 1854)
- Parent(s): Salomon Emanuel Unna and Jacobine Jacobsen

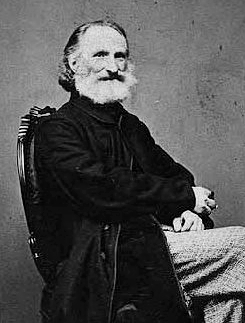
Moritz Unna; photograph by Valdemar Schou (1838-1888)

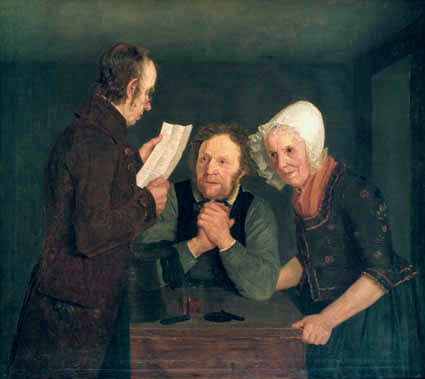
A Schoolmaster (reading a letter from an old couple's son)

Moritz Unna (31 December 1811, Copenhagen - 2 December 1871, Copenhagen) was a Danish genre painter and photographer.

== Biography ==
He was born to Salomon Emanuel Unna (1780-1819), a furniture dealer and auctioneer, and his wife, Jacobine Jacobsen. Following his father's death, his mother moved the family to Gothenburg. After finishing school, he worked in a trading office as a clerk, but wanted to be a painter. He therefore returned to Copenhagen in 1830, where he was accepted as a student at the Royal Danish Academy of Fine Arts. In 1836, he was awarded a small silver medal by the Academy's model school. During his time there he also exhibited some of his works. His 1835 painting of a schoolmaster was purchased for the Royal Collection (now the National Gallery of Denmark).

By 1837, he already seems to have been travelling abroad. In 1839, he settled in Munich. He became a member of the Kunstverein in 1841. He lived there until 1846; supporting himself by painting portraits, although he continued to create genre scenes. His early works had shown some promise, but he never achieved any significant success.

He went back to Göteborg in 1846, where he initially worked as an assistant in a bookstore. In 1850, he found employment as a drawing teacher, and began creating scenes of Swedish folk life. He sent canvases to exhibitions at the Academy in Copenhagen, beginning in 1853, and finally attracted some recognition.

His income was still insufficient to provide a decent living, so he took up photography; opening a studio in 1854. Later that year, he was able to marry his niece, Nanny Fürst (1826-1909). They moved to Copenhagen in 1863, and he bought a photography studio from Rudolph Striegler. This move did not work out well, however, as he became ill and was unable to run the studio properly. Soon, he began having financial problems, and was living in near poverty. He died in 1871, and was interred at the Assistens Cemetery.
