= Koppel (surname) =

Koppel or Kopel is surname, and may refer to:

- Anders Koppel (born 1947), Danish classical and popular composer and pianist
- Andrea Koppel (born 1963), American political and Chinese topical journalist
- Annisette Koppel (born 1948), Danish singer
- Bernie Kopell (born 1933), American character actor
- Dave Kopel (born 1960), American author, attorney, and gun rights advocate
- Gavin Koppel (stage name DJ Lyfe), American musician and graffiti artist
- Heinrich Koppel (1863–1944), Estonian medical scientist and rector
- Heinz Koppel (1919–1980), British artist
- Herman David Koppel (1908–1998), Danish classical music composer and pianist
- Lone Koppel (born 1938), Danish singer
- Martin Koppel, American leader of the Socialist Workers Party in the United States
- Naja Rosa Koppel (born 1980), Danish singer and songwriter
- Nancy Kopell (born 1942), American mathematician
- Nikolaj Koppel (born 1969), Danish pianist, music director and journalist
- Oliver Koppell (born 1940), American politician
- Ted Koppel (born 1940), American political journalist
- Thomas Koppel (1944–2006), Danish classical music composer and musician
- Virve Koppel (1931–2016), Estonian television and film director
