= Dødens Triumf =

Studio album by The Savage Rose
- Released: 1972
- Genre: Psychedelic rock, progressive rock
- Length: 42:22
- Label: Polydor
- Producer: The Savage Rose

The Savage Rose chronology
Refugee (1971)	Dødens Triumf (1972)	Babylon (1972)

Dødens Triumf (English: Triumph of Death) is an album by The Savage Rose from 1972, released on Polydor and the music for the ballet of the same name by Flemming Flindt after Eugène Ionesco play Jeux de massacre.

== Track listing ==
1. "Byen Vågner" (The City Awakes) - 6:32
2. "De Unge Elskende" (The Young Lovers) - 6:36
3. "Borgerens Død" (Death of the Citizen) - 3:27
4. "De To Gamle" (The Two Old) - 4:10
5. "Bruden Pyntes" (Dressing of the Bride) - 4:02
6. "Bryllup" (Wedding) - 3:26
7. "Soldaternes Død" (Death of the Soldiers) - 1:48
8. "Den Døde By - Modebutikken Plyndres" (The Dead City/Fashion Shop Robbery) - 7:14
9. "Dear Little Mother" - 4:53

== Personnel ==
- Annisette - Vocals
- Alex Riel – Drums, Percussion
- Ole Molin – Guitar
- Rudolf Hansen – Guitar, Bass
- Anders Koppel – Organ, Harmonica, Flute, Percussion
- Thomas Koppel – Piano, Harmonium, Percussion
