= Talent season 2 =

Talent
- Season 2
- Hosted by: Felix Schmidt
- Judges: Jokeren; Hella Joof; Nikolaj Koppel; Sanne Salomonsen (guest judge)
- Winner: Kalle Pimp
- Runner-up: Vera

Release
- Original network: DR 1
- Original release: 14 August – 24 October 2009

The second season of the Danish television talent show Talent, also called Talent 09, was aired on DR 1 on 14 August 2009 and finished on 24 October 2009. The series was hosted by Felix Schmidt. On the judging panel was Jokeren, Hella Joof and Nikolaj Koppel, The competition was won by rapper Kalle Pimp while Violinist Vera came Second and Classical Music Duo Camilla & Jonas came Third.

== Quarter-Finals & Semifinals ==
The quarterfinals began on 11 September 2009. 7 acts will perform, 2 acts will advance from the public vote, 1 act will advance from the judges vote. In the semifinals 6 acts will perform. The results is still the same

== Quarter-Finals & Semifinals summary ==
Key	Judges vote	Buzzed out	Won the public vote	Won the judges vote	Lost the judges vote

== Quarter-Finals 1 ==
Order	Artist	Act	Buzzes			Result
Order	Artist	Act	Jokeren	Hella	Nikolaj	Result
1	Joanita	Singer				Eliminated
2	Raber	Cykelist				Eliminated
3	Maximum Risk	Dance Duo				Won Public Vote
4	Ludo	Duo Singers				Lost Judges' Vote
5	Kristina	Pole Dancer				Eliminated
6	Nellie & Eva	Dance Duo				Won Judges' Vote
7	Sebastian	Singer				Won Public Vote

== Quarter-Finals 2 ==
Order	Artist	Act	Buzzes			Finished
Order	Artist	Act	Jokeren	Hella	Sanne	Finished
1	Celine	Animal Sounds				Won Public Vote
2	Team Musta	Dance Group				Eliminated
3	Camilla	Singer				Eliminated
4	TrylleAndreas	Magician				Eliminated
5	Jes Holtsø	Singer				Won Judges' Vote
6	Juel & Nissen	Dance Duo				Lost Judges' Vote
7	Maria & Michael	Singers				Won Public Vote

Nikolaj Koppel was away on the second quarter-finals so he was replaced by Sanne Salomonsen but he was back the week after

== Semi Final 1 ==
Order	Artist	Act	Buzzes			Result
Order	Artist	Act	Jokeren	Hella	Nikolaj	Result
1	Celine	Animal Sounds				Eliminated
2	Maria & Michael	Singers				Won Judges' Vote
3	Maximum Risk	Dance Duo				Eliminated
4	Jes Holtsø	Singer				Won Public Vote
5	Sebastian	Singer				Lost Judges' Vote
6	Nellie & Eva	Dance Duo				Won Public Vote

== Quarter-Finals 3 ==
Order	Artist	Act	Buzzes			Result
Order	Artist	Act	Jokeren	Hella	Nikolaj	Result
1	Sister by Blood	Dance Duo				Eliminated
2	Feridah Rose	Singer				Won Judges' Vote
3	Metal Fate	Band				Eliminated
4	Vera	Violinist				Won Public Vote
5	Sunny Cagara	Magician				Won Public Vote
6	Camilla Siebbert	Singer				Eliminated
7	Floor Gangz	Breakdancers				Lost Judges' Vote

== Quarter-Finals 4 ==
Order	Artist	Act	Buzzes			Result
Order	Artist	Act	Jokeren	Hella	Nikolaj	Result
1	Nikolaj	One Wheeled Bicykelist				Eliminated
2	Maria	Singer				Eliminated
3	Camilla & Jonas	Classical Music Player Duo				Won Public Vote
4	Seya	Dancer				Lost Judges' Vote
5	Jeppe	Trumpet Player				Won Judges' Vote
6	Sigmund	Singer & Dancer				Eliminated
7	Kalle Pimp	Rapper				Won Public Vote

== Semi Final 2 ==
Order	Artist	Act	Buzzes			Result
Order	Artist	Act	Jokeren	Hella	Nikolaj	Result
1	Camilla & Jonas	Classical Music Player Duo				Won Judges' Vote
2	Kalle Pimp	Rapper				Won Public Vote
3	Feridah Rose	Singer				Eliminated
4	Jeppe	Trumpet Player				Eliminated
5	Sunny Cagara	Magician				Lost Judges' Vote
6	Vera	Violinist				Won Public Vote

== Final ==
=== Final summary ===
Key	Buzzed out	Winner	Runner-up	3rd Place

Order	Artist	Act	Buzzes			Finished
Order	Artist	Act	Jokeren	Hella	Nikolaj	Finished
1	Maria & Michael	Singers				Bottom 3
2	Vera	Violinist				2nd
3	Kalle Pimp	Rapper				1st
4	Jes Holtsø	Singer				Bottom 3
5	Camilla & Jonas	Classical Music Player Duo				3rd
6	Nellie & Eva	Dance Duo				Bottom 3
