= 23rd federal electoral district of Mexico City =

Defunct federal electoral district of Mexico

Coordinates: 19°21′00″N 99°09′44″W

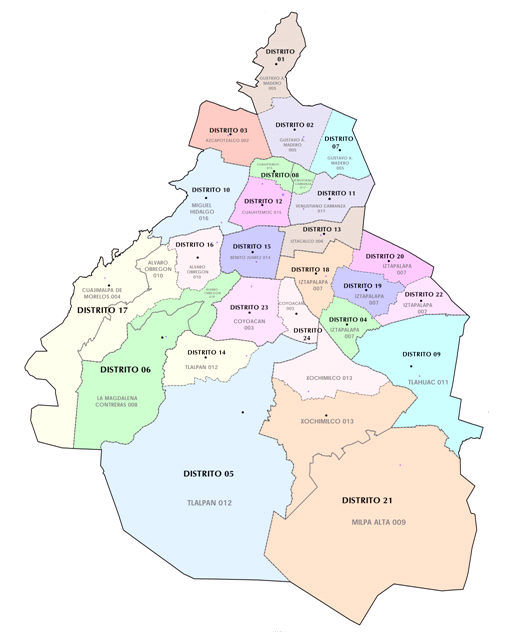
Mexico City under the 2017–2022 districting plan

The 23rd federal electoral district of Mexico City (Distrito electoral federal 23 de la Ciudad de México; previously "of the Federal District") is a defunct Mexican electoral district. It was in existence from 1961 to 2022.

During that time, it returned one deputy to the Chamber of Deputies for each three-year legislative session by means of the first-past-the-post system, electing its first in the 1961 mid-term election and its last in the 2021 mid-terms. From 1979 onwards, votes cast in the district also counted towards the calculation of proportional representation ("plurinominal") deputies elected from the country's electoral regions.

The 23rd and 24th districts were abolished by the National Electoral Institute (INE) in its 2023 redistricting process because, according to the results of the 2020 census, the capital's population no longer warranted that number of seats in Congress.

== District territory ==
Evolution of electoral district numbers
	1974	1978	1996	2005	2017	2023
Mexico City (Federal District)	27	40	30	27	24	22
Chamber of Deputies	196	300				

1996, 2005 and 2017

Under the three districting schemes in force between 1996 and 2022, the 23rd district covered different portions of the borough of Coyoacán.

1978–1996

The districting scheme in force from 1978 to 1996 was the result of the 1977 electoral reforms, which increased the number of single-member seats in the Chamber of Deputies from 196 to 300. Under that plan, the Federal District's seat allocation rose from 27 to 40. Between 1978 and 1996, the 23rd district comprised the whole of the borough of Cuajimalpa and part of Álvaro Obregón.

== Deputies returned to Congress ==
(Mexico) National parties
- Current
- PAN
- PRI
- PT
- PVEM
- MC
- Morena
- PAZ
- Somos
- Defunct or local only
- PLM
- PNR
- PRM
- PNM
- PP
- PPS
- PARM
- PFCRN
- CON
- PANAL
- PSD
- PES
- PES
- PRD

Mexico City's 23rd district
Election	Deputy	Party	Term	Legislature
1961	Antonio Vargas McDonald	Institutional Revolutionary Party	1961–1964	45th Congress
1964	Fernando González Piñón	Institutional Revolutionary Party	1964–1967	46th Congress
1967	Hilario Galguera Torres	Institutional Revolutionary Party	1967–1970	47th Congress
1970	Ignacio Herrerías Montoya	Institutional Revolutionary Party	1970–1973	48th Congress
1973	Carlos Madrazo Pintado	Institutional Revolutionary Party	1973–1976	49th Congress
1976	Enrique Soto Izquierdo	Institutional Revolutionary Party	1976–1979	50th Congress
1979	Cuauhtémoc de Anda Gutiérrez	Institutional Revolutionary Party	1979–1982	51st Congress
1982	Servio Tulio Acuña	Institutional Revolutionary Party	1982–1985	52nd Congress
1985	Juan José Bremer	Institutional Revolutionary Party	1985–1988	53rd Congress
1988	Esther Kolteniuk Toyber	Institutional Revolutionary Party	1988–1991	54th Congress
1991	Alfonso Rivera Domínguez	Institutional Revolutionary Party	1991–1994	55th Congress
1994	Óscar Levín Coppel	Institutional Revolutionary Party	1994–1997	56th Congress
1997	Pablo Gómez Álvarez	Party of the Democratic Revolution	1997–2000	57th Congress
2000	Miguel Bortolini Castillo	Party of the Democratic Revolution	2000–2003	58th Congress
2003	Pablo Gómez Álvarez	Party of the Democratic Revolution	2003–2006	59th Congress
2006	Adrián Pedrozo Castillo	Party of the Democratic Revolution	2006–2009	60th Congress
2009	Mauricio Toledo Gutiérrez	Party of the Democratic Revolution	2009–2012	61st Congress
2012	José Valentín Maldonado Salgado	Party of the Democratic Revolution	2012–2015	62nd Congress
2015	Ariadna Montiel Reyes (Note: At the start of the congressional session, Montiel resigned from the PRD and sat as an independent. In February 2016 she joined the Morena group in Congress.)	Party of the Democratic Revolution	2015–2018	63rd Congress
2018	Pablo Gómez Álvarez	National Regeneration Movement	2018–2021	64th Congress
2021	Gabriel Quadri de la Torre	National Action Party (Mexico)	2021–2024	65th Congress

== Presidential elections ==
Mexico City's 23rd district
Election	District won by	Party or coalition	%
2018	Andrés Manuel López Obrador	Juntos Haremos Historia	56.2662
