= Flemming Flindt =

Danish choreographer

Flemming Flindt (30 June 1936 – 3 March 2009) was a Danish choreographer born in Copenhagen. He studied at the Royal Danish Ballet and Paris Opera Ballet schools, joined the Royal Danish Ballet and was promoted to soloist in 1955. He guested with the London Festival Ballet in 1955, the Ballet Rambert in 1960, the Royal Ballet 1963 and the Bolshoi Ballet in 1968, becoming an étoile at the Paris Opera Ballet in 1961.

== Career ==
His first ballet was Enetime, a 1963 adaptation of Ionesco's La Leçon, original English title of the ballet The Private Lesson, to a score by Georges Delerue and was commissioned by Danish television, later being adapted for the stage, making its premiere with Royal Danish Ballet on tour in Paris in 1964; Flindt returned to the Royal Danish Ballet as artistic director from 1966 to 1978. Other ballets he made on the Royal Danish Ballet include Gala Variations Music: Knudåge Riisager first performance was 5 March 1967, Ballet Royal Music: Knudåge Riisager first performance was on 31 May 1967, The Miraculous Mandarin to Bartók (1967), Swineherd Music: Knudåge Riisager first performance was on 11 March 1969 The Nutcracker to Tchaikovsky in 1971, Jeux to Debussy in 1973 and Dreamland, to a score by Herman David Koppel in 1974.

In 1978 he formed his own dance company. Its first work, Salome, premiered on 10 November 1978, at Copenhagen's Cirkusbygningen (The Circus Building). It featured music composed by Peter Maxwell Davies, performed by the Danish Radio Concert Orchestra and conducted by Janos Fürst. The principal dancers were Vivi Flindt, his wife, as Salome; Jonny Eliasson as John the Baptist; and Lizzie Rhode as Herodias. Flindt danced the role of Herod, and Vivi danced her final scene completely nude. This caused less of a sensation than the couple's previous nude ballet Dødens triumf (The Triumph of Death), a television ballet in which the whole cast danced naked to a 1971 score by The Savage Rose (its stage premiere at the Royal Danish Theatre was in 1972). Salome was filmed and shown on national television.

From 1981 to 1989 he became artistic director of the Dallas Ballet, after which he continued to work as a freelance choreographer, especially with the Cleveland Ballet. In 1991 he returned to the Royal Danish Ballet to make Caroline Mathilde to another Peter Maxwell Davies score and Legs of Fire in 1998 to a score by Erik Norby.

Flemming Flindt was made a Knight of Dannebrog in 1974 and received the Carina Ari Medal in 1975. He was married to the dancer Vivi Flindt, who created leading roles in a number of his ballets.

Flemming Flindt works continue to be performed as part of the extensive repertoire of Ballet San Jose. He was present in November 2008 to personally stage Ballet San Jose's production of his work, The Toreador.

== Death ==
Flindt died on 3 March 2009 in Sarasota, Florida, in the United States.
