= Peder Severin =

Danish operatic tenor (born 1936)

Peder Severin (born 1936) was a Danish operatic tenor. He made his debuts with Danish National Opera in 1971 and Royal Opera Copenhagen in 1972. In addition to Schubert's song-cycles, Severin has made several premiere recordings of little-known Danish songs with pianist Dorte Kirkeskov.

Peder Severin started his singing career in the boy’s choir of the Cathedral in Viborg, Jutland. Later on, after private studies in his younger years, he continued his studies at the Opera Academy of the Royal Danish Academy of Music in Copenhagen, from where he graduated in 1971.

Subsequently he received scholarships to study at the Conservatorio di Musica S. Cecilia in Rome and with professor Georges Cunelli in London as well as Anton Dermota in Vienna and Nicolai Gedda in Stockholm.

Severin's repertoire includes many lyric tenor roles in opera and operetta, and he has had a very extensive career as a lieder and oratorio soloist in Denmark, Sweden, Norway, Germany, the United Kingdom, Poland, Spain, Belgium, Australia, and the former Czechoslovakia. He has sung on radio and television and with all of the Danish Symphony Orchestras, as well as with foreign orchestras including Philharmonia Slask, Hamburger Philharmonische Staatsorchester, and the Bamberg Symphony Orchestra. Peder Severin has several gramophone recordings and CDs to his credit. (See discografi)

In 1981 Peder Severin and Dorte Kirkeskov (1949–2005) established The Danish Lied Duo, starting with a Liedconcert in the Tivoli Concert Hall in Copenhagen. Besides concerts in all danish concerthouses, the duo has toured with great success in e.g. Australia, France and Spain. Their repertoire includes especially the great Danish and Nordic songs and romances e.g. Carl Nielsen, Grieg, Sibelius, Peterson-Berger, and the classical romantic liedrepertoire including Schuberts and Schumanns songcycles, Liszt, Beethoven, Mahler, Britten, English folksongs among others.

Peder Severin and Dorte Kirkeskov has recorded eleven cd’s. In 1992 the duo was nominated to the Danish Grammy Award for Romantic Danish Songs, Dacapo 1991.

== Selected discography ==
- Nordiske Romancer (1983, Rondo/Danacord), RLP 8306
- Carl Nielsen-sange (1987, Rondo), RLP 8319
- The Lesser Known Nielsen Vol. I (1988, Rondo), RCD 8319
- The Lesser Known Nielsen Vol. II (1988, Rondo), RCD 832
- The Lesser Known Nielsen Vol. IV (1990, Rondo), RCD 8327

On Danacord:

- Schubert - Die schöne Müllerin - DACOCD 396
- Schubert - Winterreise - DACOCD 397
- Nordic Romantic Songs - Peter Heise, Carl Nielsen, Grieg, P.E. Lange-Müller Peterson-Berger, Sibelius. DACOCD 441

On Dacapo Records:

- Songs - 20th Century: Tage Nielsen, Erik Norby, Vagn Holmboe, Herman D. Koppel.
- Danish Romantic Songs - Victor Bendix, Hakon Børresen, August Enna, Fini Henriques, Rued Langgaard, Ludolf Nielsen.
