= Pablo Gómez Álvarez =

Mexican politician (born 1946)

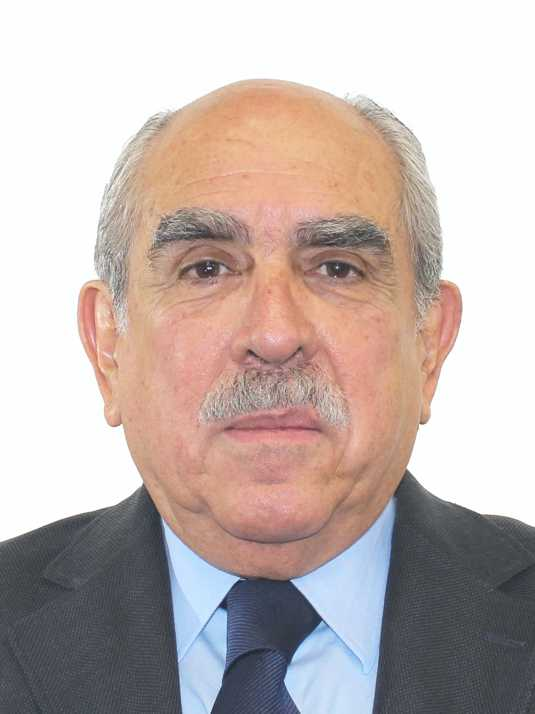

Member of the Chamber of Deputies for Mexico City's 23rd district
- In office 1 September 2018 – 31 August 2021
- Preceded by: Ariadna Montiel Reyes
- In office 1 September 2003 – 31 August 2006
- Preceded by: Miguel Bortolini Castillo
- Succeeded by: Adrián Pedrozo Castillo
- In office 1 September 1997 – 31 August 2000
- Preceded by: Óscar Levín Coppel
- Succeeded by: Miguel Bortolini Castillo

President of the Party of the Democratic Revolution
- In office 10 April 1999 – 30 May 1999
- Preceded by: Andrés Manuel López Obrador
- Succeeded by: Amalia García

Member of the Chamber of Deputies Proportional representation
- In office 1 September 1988 – 31 August 1991
- In office 1 September 1979 – 31 August 1982

Personal details
- Born: 21 October 1946 (age 79) Mexico City, Mexico
- Party: National Regeneration Movement (2017–present)
- Other political affiliations: PRD (1989–2017); PSUM (1981–1987); PCM (1963–1981)
- Occupation: Politician

Pablo Gómez Álvarez (Note: In this Mexican name, the surname is Gómez and the second or maternal family name is Álvarez.) (born 21 October 1946) is a Mexican politician. He was the president of the Party of the Democratic Revolution (PRD) and has served in both houses of Congress. On 8 November 2021 he was appointed to head the Unidad de Inteligencia Financiera, the country's financial intelligence unit.

== Biography ==
Gómez Álvarez played a prominent role in the student movement of 1968. On 2 October 1968, he was detained by the authorities at the Plaza of the Three Cultures during the Tlatelolco massacre and was imprisoned until 1971. When he left jail, he immediately rejoined the student movement and became one of the organizers of the mobilization of 10 June. He obtained a degree in economics from the National Autonomous University of Mexico (UNAM) in 1976.

Gómez held the national direction of the Mexican Communist Party (PCM) and was later elected to the Chamber of Deputies in the 1979 election as part of a leftist coalition. From 1982 to 1988, he was the president of the Unified Socialist Party of Mexico (PSUM). In 1988, he was elected as a federal deputy again and, as a member of the first parliamentary group the Party of the Democratic Revolution had in Congress, he was appointed deputy coordinator of it.

From 1992 to 1995, Gómez held a seat in the Legislative Assembly of the Federal District. In 1993 he was a main organizer of a recall election against a government in the capital of the republic. He was the founding director of a weekly magazine issued by the PRD from 1992 to 1994.

He was elected to the Chamber of Deputies for the Federal District's 23rd (Coyoacán) on three occasions (1997, 2003 and 2018), serving in the 57th, 59th and 64th congressional sessions. While a deputy he positioned himself against the FOBAPROA, a banking rescue which required spending many resources, and which was actively promoted by members of the PRI and PAN parties; he eventually achieved an opening of the lists of beneficiaries of the FOBAPROA, though without getting any conclusive results because of the negative response of the newly created Instituto para la Protección al Ahorro Bancario (IPAB). As coordinator of the PRD's parliamentary group, he managed, for the first time ever in Mexico, to modify the budget by 15 billion pesos that were channelled to the federal organizations, the higher education budget and the retirement funds budget, among others.

In 1999, Gómez was temporarily president of the PRD. From 2000 and until 2003, he was the PRD's representative to the Federal Electoral Institute, where — after an investigation — he filed a lawsuit against the President of the Republic, Vicente Fox, for the alleged illegal use of resources through the Amigos de Fox ("Friends of Fox") corruption scandal. He also pursued an investigation into the Pemexgate corruption scandal, through which he was able to get the ratification of the fine of 1 billion pesos against some PRI members.

He was a candidate for Head of Government of the Federal District on two occasions: in the year 2000, losing to Andrés Manuel López Obrador; and again in 2006, but that time he declined his candidacy in favour of Jesús Ortega as the representative of the group TUCOI ("All United With the Left") against the candidacy of the ultimately successful candidate, Marcelo Ebrard.

He was the leader of his own internal political current within the Party of the Democratic Revolution, Movimiento por la Democracia ("Movement for Democracy"). Other members included Inti Muñoz Santini, Alfonso Ramírez Cuéllar, Clara Brugada, Javier González Garza, Jorge Martínez Ramos, Juan N. Guerra Ochoa, and Salvador Martínez della Rocca.

He resigned his membership in the PRD in 2017. He joined the National Regeneration Movement (Morena) the following year. In the June 2021 mid-term election, he fought to retain his seat in Congress but lost to Gabriel Quadri of the PAN.

On 8 November 2021, President Andrés Manuel López Obrador selected him to head the Unidad de Inteligencia Financiera, the country's financial intelligence unit.

== Career as author ==
He is the author of several books such as Los gastos secretos del Presidente, a book that denounces the expenses in dollars of Carlos Salinas de Gortari. Another of his works is México 1988: Disputa por la presidencia y Lucha Parlamentaria, which narrates how the 1988 electoral fraud was consolidated against Cuauhtémoc Cárdenas and how it was debated at the Chamber of Deputies. In a book derived from his professional thesis, entitled Democracia y crisis política en México, he argues in defense of the fight for the political freedom in the country.

== Notes ==
Preceded by Andrés Manuel López Obrador	President of the Party of the Democratic Revolution; 1999	Succeeded by Amalia García Medina
