= Coppel (surname) =

Coppel is a surname. Notable people with the surname include:

- Alec Coppel (1907–1972), Australian-born author
- Alfred Coppel (1921–2004), American author
- Charles Coppel (born 1937), Australian political scientist and former barrister
- Óscar Levín Coppel (1948–2026), Mexican politician from the Institutional Revolutionary Party
- Jérôme Coppel (born 1986), French road racing cyclist
- Juan José Suárez Coppel, Mexican economist and functionary

== See also ==
- Coppel, Mexican department store founded by Enrique Coppel Tamayo
- Coppell (disambiguation)
- Koppel (disambiguation)
