= Talent 09 =

Danish television series

Talent 09 is the second series of the Danish adaption of the program format Got Talent. The first season was named Talent 08.

The show and the price of 250.000 DKK was won by 23-year old rapper Kalle Pimp.

== Judges ==
- Jesper Dahl
- Hella Joof
- Nikolaj Koppel

== Crew ==
- Executive producer: Henrik Hancke Nielsen
- Producer: Ask Greiffenberg
- Producer: Thomas Meyer
