= Vivi Flindt =

Danish dancer

Vivi Flindt (née Gelker; born 22 February 1943; Copenhagen) is a Danish dancer. She studied at the Royal Danish Ballet School, then joined the company, making her debut as Birgit Cullberg's Miss Julie in 1965 and being promoted to soloist in 1967. She married the choreographer and dancer Flemming Flindt in 1970 and created roles in several of his ballets:

- 1967 The Miraculous Mandarin
- 1968 Sacre du printemps
- 1971 Triumph of Death
- 1973 Felix Luna
- 1978 Salome

She presently works as a choreographer and recently worked with the Ballet San Jose on their production of The Toreador in 2008 using the Bournonville method.
