= Fidibus =

- Directed by: Hella Joof
- Written by: Hella Joof
- Produced by: Thomas Gammeltoft; Jannik Johansen (executive)
- Starring: Rudi Køhnke; Lene Maria Christensen; Jonatan Spang; Jokeren
- Release date: October 13, 2006
- Country: Denmark
- Language: Danish

Fidibus is a Danish film by Hella Joof from 2006. It was first presented at the Roskilde Festival in the summer of 2006, but did not debut in cinemas until October 13.

== Starring ==
- Rudi Køhnke as Kalle, the main character
- Jonatan Spang, a Danish stand-up comedian, as Kalle's friend Agger
- Jesper "Jokeren" Dahl, a Danish rapper, as the dealer Paten

=== Plot ===
Kalle, who is studying at the university, and his friend Agger eventually lose some hash that originally belongs to Paten (Abbreviation for "psykopaten", "the psychopath"). However, straight after Paten goes to jail, Kalle falls in love with his ignorant girlfriend Sabrina, though he has been warned not to touch Paten's money, girl(s) or car.
