= Coppell =

Coppell may refer to:

- Coppell, Ontario
- Coppell, Texas
  - Coppell High School
- Harry Coppell (born 1996), English pole vaulter
- Steve Coppell (born 1955), English football manager

== See also ==
- Coppel, department store
- Coppel (surname)
- Koppel (disambiguation)
