= Ask Greiffenberg =

Ask Greiffenberg (born 3 August 1973) is a Danish television producer and television director. He works at BLU, part of FremantleMedia.

== Biography ==
Ask Greiffenberg started his own company "Hip-Sound" in 1995. It was later renamed "Bolsjevik". The company is now called "Popgun" and is developing software automation tools for the broadcast industry.

== Recent productions ==
Talent 09

== Awards ==
Ask Greiffenberg received an award for Best Entertainment Show in 2007 at the annual Danish TV Festival for Gu'skelov Du Kom (the Danish version of Thank God You're Here).
