= Jokeren =

Danish hip-hop artist and rapper (born 1973)

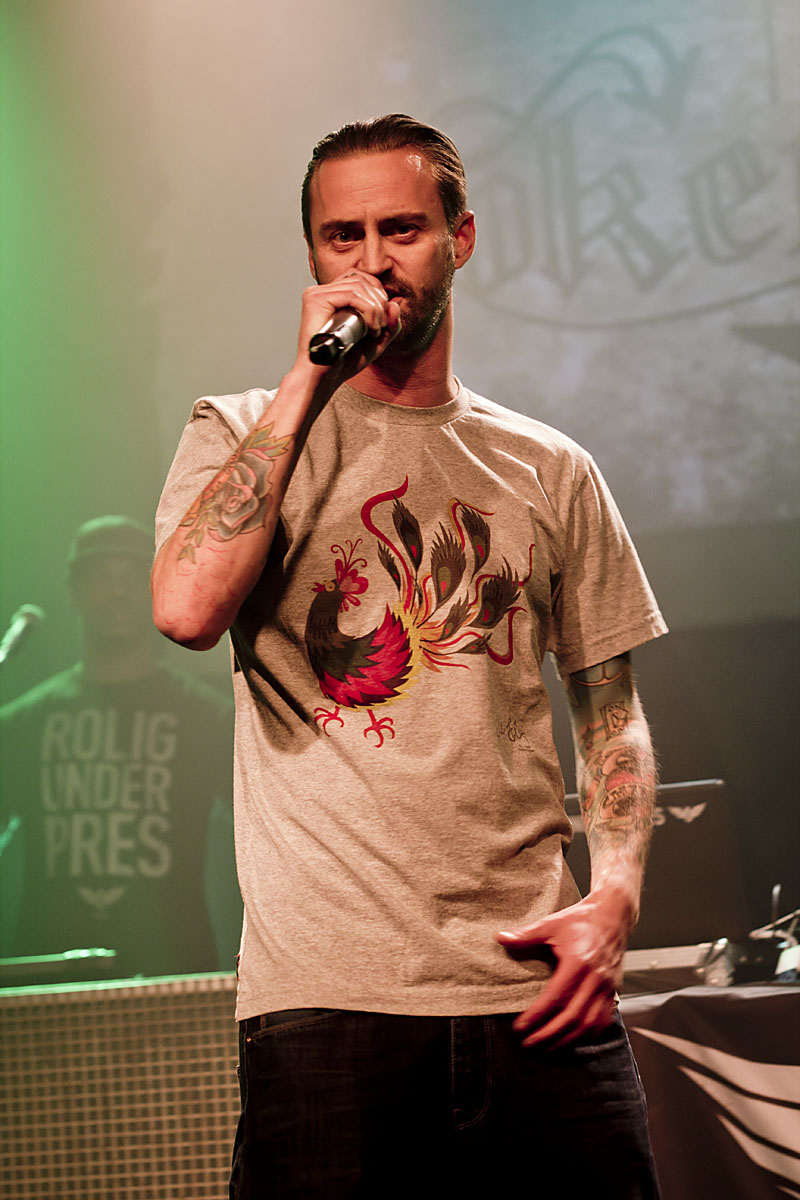
Jokeren (2013)

Jesper Dahl (born 13 June 1973), better known by the stage name Jokeren (The Joker), is a Danish hip-hop artist and rapper.

Dahl was born in Hillerød. In addition to his own recordings, he has been a prolific producer and has worked on American hip-hop albums, including one of Ice Cube's, alongside Danish productions. In 2006 he played the role of a mad drug dealer in Hella Joof's film Fidibus.

Jesper Dahl appears as one of the three judges in the Television Show Talent 09, a Danish adaptation of Britain's Got Talent.

== Discography ==
=== Solo albums ===
Year	Album	Peak positions	Certification
Year	Album	DEN	Certification
2003	Alpha-Han	3	
2005	Gigolo Jesus	7	
2009	Den tørstige digter	6	
2014	Dansker	25	

=== Singles ===
Year	Single	Peak positions	Album
Year	Single	DEN	Album
2004	"Det ku ha været dig"	9	
2009	"Gå væk!" (with Blæs Bukki)	6	
2009	"Sig ja"	4	
2011	"Jeg vil altid (elske dig for evigt)"	1	
2014	"Kun os to" (feat. Pauline)	5	

Other singles

- 2003: "Havnen"
- 2003: "Kvinde din"
- 2003: "Sulten"
- 2005: "Godt taget"
- 2005: "Gravøl"
- 2005: "Rastløs"
- 2005: "Mænds ruin"
- 2008: "Yæssør"
- 2014: "Mit liv som hobo (så'n nogen som os)"
