= Koeppel =

Koeppel is a surname. Notable people with the surname include:

- Alfred J. Koeppel (1932–2001), American real estate developer
- Gerard Koeppel (born 1975), American author and historian
- Gerhard Koeppel (1936–2012), German historian of Roman art
- Horst Köppel (born 1948), German football player and manager
- Dan Koeppel (born 1962), American author
- Nora Köppel (born 1972), Argentine weightlifter
- Roger Köppel (born 1965), Swiss politician, journalist, entrepreneur and publicist

== See also ==
- Koppel (disambiguation)
