= Miguel Bortolini =

Mexican politician

Deputy of the Congress of the Union for the 23rd district of Mexico City
- In office 1 September 2000 – 31 August 2003
- Preceded by: Pablo Gómez Álvarez
- Succeeded by: Pablo Gómez Álvarez

Personal details
- Born: 29 September 1941 Mexico City, Mexico
- Died: 13 August 2016 (aged 74)
- Party: PRD
- Occupation: Politician

Miguel Bortolini Castillo (29 September 1941 – 13 August 2016) was a Mexican politician from the Party of the Democratic Revolution (PRD). From 2000 to 2003, he served as a deputy in the 58th Congress, representing the Federal District's 23rd congressional district. He was also President of the Mexico City borough of Coyoacán from 2003 to 2006.

Bortolini died on 13 August 2016 from cancer at the age of 74.
