= José Valentín Maldonado Salgado =

Mexican politician (born 1980)

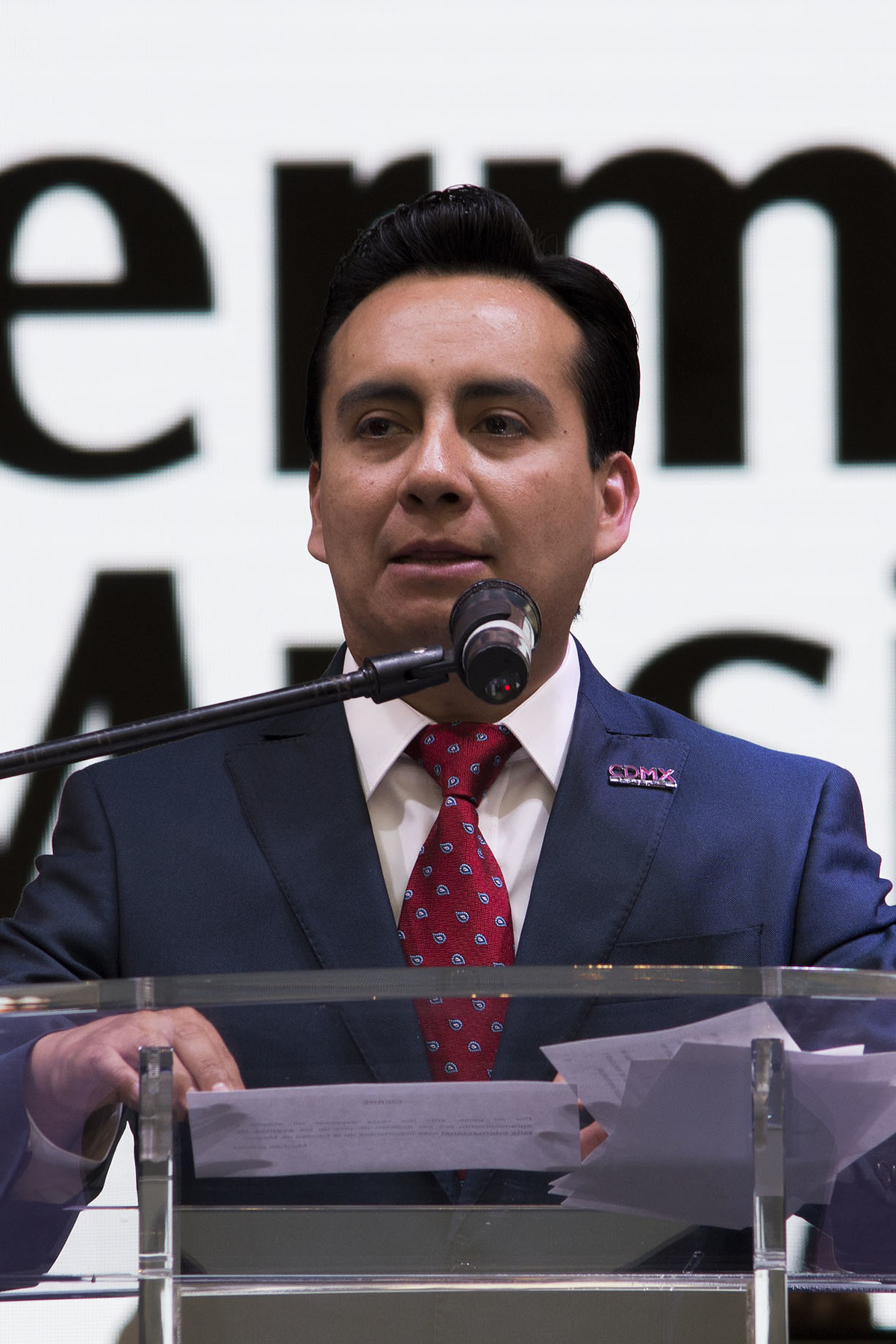
- Born: 14 February 1980 (age 46); Mexico City, Mexico
- Occupation: Deputy
- Political party: PRD

José Valentín Maldonado Salgado (born 14 February 1980) is a Mexican politician affiliated with the Party of the Democratic Revolution (PRD). In 2012–2015 he served as a deputy in the 62nd Congress, representing the Federal District's 23rd congressional district.
