= Mauricio Toledo =

Mexican politician

- Born: Mauricio Toledo Gutiérrez; 19 June 1980 (age 45); Mexico City, Mexico
- Occupation: Politician
- Political party: PRD

Mauricio Alonso Toledo Gutiérrez (born 19 June 1980) is a Mexican-Chilean politician from the Party of the Democratic Revolution (PRD). He was born in Mexico City to Chilean parents.

From 2009 to 2012 he served as a deputy in the 61st Congress, representing the Federal District's 23rd congressional district. He had previously served in the IV Legislature of the Legislative Assembly of the Federal District.

In August 2021, Toledo was accused of fleeing to Chile after being impeached due to malpolitics.
