= Koppel =

Koppel, Koppell, or Kopel may refer to:

- 6361 Koppel, a minor planet
- Köppel (Westerwald), a summit and viewing tower in the Montabaur Heights, Westerwald, Germany
- Koppel, Pennsylvania, U.S.
- Orenstein and Koppel GmbH, a German engineering company (1876-1999)
- Koppel (surname)
- Koppel (headware), also kippah or yarmulke, traditionally worn by Jewish males

== See also ==
- Coppel, a Mexican department store
- Coppell (disambiguation)
- Koeppel (disambiguation)
