= Unidad de Inteligencia Financiera (Mexico) =

Mexican financial intelligence agency

Unidad de Inteligencia Financiera (UIF; Financial Intelligence Unit) is an administrative unit of Mexico's Secretariat of Finance and Public Credit responsible for receiving, analyzing and disseminating information related to the prevention, detection and combat to the violations of operations with illegal resources such as money laundering and terrorist-financing activities. Its main source of information are the reports and notices provided by the financial institutions in the country.

The UIF was created on 7 May 2004, during the presidency of Vicente Fox Quesada.

== Agency executives ==
UIF agency executives
Agency executive	Period
Concepción Patiño Cestafe	2004–2006
Agustín Acosta Azcón	2006
Luis Urrutia Corral	2006–2010
José Alberto Balbuena Balbuena	2011–2013
Alberto Bazbaz Sacal	2013–2018
Orlando Suárez López	2018
Santiago Nieto Castillo	2018–2021
Pablo Gómez Álvarez	2021–2025
Omar Reyes Colmenares	2025

== See also ==
- Secretariat of Finance and Public Credit
