= Santiago Nieto =

Mexican politician

Nieto in 2021

Santiago Nieto Castillo (born 27 January 1973) is a Mexican politician, member of the National Regeneration Movement (Morena). Born in San Juan del Río, Querétaro, he has served as head of the Mexican Institute of Industrial Property (IMPI), Attorney General of the State of Hidalgo, and head of the Financial Intelligence Unit (UIF). In the 2024 general election, he unsuccessfully sought election to the Senate for his home state.

In 2026, Morena announced him as the "state coordinator for the defense of the transformation and national sovereignty", a position expected to represent the party in the Querétaro gubernatorial election of 6 June 2027.

He is married to Carla Humphrey Jordan, civil servant and electoral commissioner at the National Electoral Institute (INE).
