= Thomas Koppel =

Danish composer (1944–2006)

- Born: Thomas Herman Koppel; 27 April 1944; Örebro, Sweden
- Died: 25 February 2006 (aged 61); Puerto Rico
- Resting place: Assistens Cemetery
- Education: Royal Danish Academy of Music
- Years active: 1961–2006
- Known for: Dødens Triumf; Savage Rose
- Spouse(s): Ilse Maria Lanser; Annisette Koppel
- Children: With Ilse Maria Lanser: David Koppel (born 1966); Alex Koppel (born 1968); With Annisette Hansen: Billie Koppel (born 1972); Naja Rosa (born 1980)
- Parent(s): Herman D. Koppel & Vibeke Koppel
- Relatives: Sisters: Therese Koppel (b. 1936); Lone Koppel (b. 1938); Brother: Anders Koppel (b. 1947)

Thomas Koppel (27 April 1944 – 25 February 2006) was a Danish classical music and avant-garde popular composer and musician.

His father, Herman David Koppel (1908-1998), a composer and pianist of Jewish origin, fled the Nazis with his family in 1943. Thomas was born in a refugee camp in Sweden. The family moved to Denmark and Thomas studied at the Royal Danish Academy of Music with his father who was professor of piano.

Like his father, Thomas Koppel became a classical pianist and composer. He wrote string quartets, a piano concerto, operas, cantatas, a ballet, symphonies and other orchestral works. At age 18 he completed his first opera The Story of a Mother, based on a tale by Hans Christian Andersen. Koppel composed the score in 1971 for the ballet Dødens Triumf (Triumph of Death) which was danced naked at the Royal Danish Theatre.

Unlike his father, Thomas Koppel also composed and performed avant-garde popular music. He founded the experimental rock group Savage Rose with his brother Anders and sister Lone. In 1968 they added four more members including the singer Annisette. Aside from rock, the group fused elements from classical music, jazz and rhythm and blues. Thomas Koppel and Annisette later became partners and married. They were deeply committed to projects to promote peace and social justice and in 1996 moved to Los Angeles drawn by its cultural and social diversity, including the homeless. Koppel died unexpectedly on vacation in Puerto Rico. One of his compositions is: Visions Fugitives for piano & orchestra.

Minor planet 6361 Koppel discovered in 1978 by Eleanor Helin and Schelte J. Bus is named after him.

== Discography ==
- The Savage Rose
