= The Savage Rose =

Danish psychedelic rock group

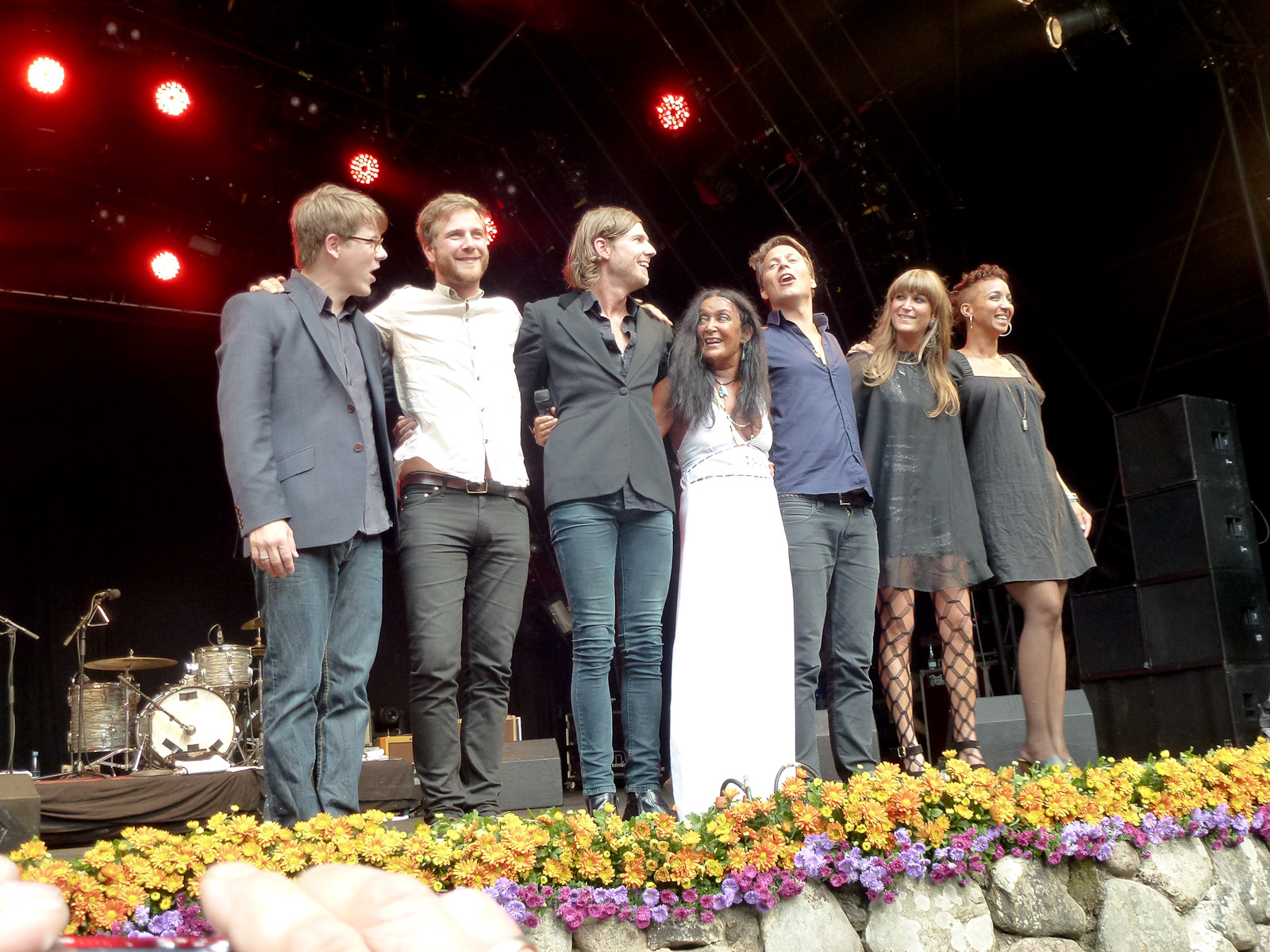
- Savage Rose at Smukfest 2011

Background information
- Origin: Denmark
- Genres: Psychedelic rock, progressive rock, folk rock, psychedelic folk, blues rock
- Years active: 1967-present
- Members: 2015: Annisette Koppel (vocals); Naja Rosa Koppel (chorus); Amina Carsce Nissen (chorus); Palle Hjorth (Hammond organ, piano, synths etc.); Anders Holm (drums, percussion); Jakob Falgre (bass, Moog); Rune Kjeldsen (guitar, mandolin); Frank Hasselstrøm (trombone, trumpet, keyboards)
- Past members: Among others: Thomas Koppel; Anders Koppel; Alex Riel; Jens Rugsted; Flemming Ostermann; John Ravn
- Website: www.thesavagerose.net

The Savage Rose is a Danish psychedelic rock group, formed in 1967.

== Career ==
The band was founded in 1967 by Thomas Koppel, Anders Koppel, Alex Riel, Jens Rugsted, Flemming Ostermann, and singer Annisette Koppel. Ilse Marie Koppel was also participating. Nils Tuxen replaced Flemming Ostermann from their second album.

Since the mid-1970s, the group was an acoustic trio consisting of Thomas Koppel, Annisette Koppel (then Hansen) and John Ravn as a core. From the beginning of the 1990s, the group returned to electric instrumentation. Thomas Koppel died on February 25, 2006.

After the release of Love and Freedom in 2012, Savage Rose went on tour, but in Christmas 2013 they were back in the studio recording new songs and re-recording old songs. The album titled Roots of the Wasteland was released in April 2014; after 47 years and 21 studio albums, they are still going strong. The first single "Mr. World" was released April 12, 2014, and the new album was released May 19.

In 1996 The Savage Rose received a Danish Music Award for the album Black Angel, which was recorded in the US. The band's debut album, The Savage Rose, was chosen as part of the Danish Culture Canon in 2006.

On February 10, 2017, it was announced on their Facebook page that The Savage Rose will be releasing a new studio album as they tour to celebrate their 50-year anniversary.

On August 10, 2017, a new single "Woman" was released and the date for their new studio album Homeless was September 15, 2017.

== Reception ==
In Christgau's Record Guide: Rock Albums of the Seventies (1981), Robert Christgau wrote of the Savage Rose's 1970 LP Your Daily Gift: "This band has a knack for combining funky riffs with persistent melodies (borrowed from where, this ignorant American wonders). But though Annisette's multi-octave Lolita voice is certainly distinctive, I find her about as sexy as Yma Sumac, and as long as she sings Anders Koppel's lyrics she won't be any font of wisdom either." He appreciated the "fast tempos, soul piano," and production of their Jimmy Miller-produced Refugee (1971) more, saying they "do wonders for Anisette's come-on, and the lyrics prove that getting laid is a universal language. Death, too."

== Discography ==
=== Albums ===
==== Studio albums ====
Title	Album details	Peak chart positions	
Title	Album details	DEN	NOR
The Savage Rose	Released: July 1968; Label: Polydor; Formats: LP	—	12
In the Plain	Released: December 1968; Label: Polydor; Formats: LP, MC	—	—
Travelin'	Released: November 1969; Label: Polydor; Formats: LP, MC	3	6
Your Daily Gift	Released: November 1970; Label: Polydor, RCA; Formats: LP, MC, 8-track	10	18
Refugee	Released: September 1971; Label: Polydor, RCA; Formats: LP, MC	—	—
Dødens triumf	Released: May 1972; Label: Polydor; Formats: LP, MC; Meaning: Triumph of Death	2	—
Babylon	Released: January 1973; Label: Polydor; Formats: LP, MC	9	—
Wild Child	Released: 1973; Label: Polydor; Formats: LP, MC	—	—
Solen var også din	Released: 1978; Label: Sonet; Formats: LP, MC; Meaning: The Sun Was Yours Too	—	—
En vugge af stål	Released: 1982; Label: Nexø Forlag; Formats: LP; Meaning: Cradle of Steel	—	—
Vi kæmper for at sejre	Released: 1984; Label: Nexø Forlag; Formats: LP, MC; Meaning: We Struggle for Victory	—	—
Kejserens nye klæder	Released: 1986; Label: Rosen; Formats: LP; Meaning: The Emperor's New Clothes	—	—
Sangen for livet	Released: February 1988; Label: Nexø Forlag; Formats: CD, LP, MC; Meaning: The Song for Life	—	—
Ild og Frihed	Released: 1989; Label: Nexø Forlag; Formats: 2xCD, 2xLP, MC; Meaning: Fire and Freedom	—	—
Gadens dronning	Released: 1990; Label: RCA; Formats: CD, LP, MC; Meaning: Queen of the Streets	—	—
Månebarn	Released: 1992; Label: EMI; Formats: CD, LP, MC; Meaning: Moonchild	—	—
Black Angel	Released: 1995; Label: Mega; Formats: CD, MC	—	9
Tameless	Released: 29 October 1998; Label: Mega; Formats: CD	14	19
For Your Love	Released: 26 October 2001; Label: Mega; Formats: CD	10	—
Universal Daughter	Released: 19 November 2007; Label: Columbia/Sony BMG; Formats: CD	13	34
Love and Freedom	Released: 10 September 2012; Label: Nordic Music Society; Formats: CD, LP	8	—
Roots of the Wasteland	Released: 19 May 2014; Label: Target; Formats: CD, LP	3	—
Homeless	Released: 15 September 2017; Label: Target; Formats: CD, LP, digital download	5	—
"—" denotes releases that did not chart or were not released in that territory.

==== Live albums ====
Title	Album details	Peak chart positions
Title	Album details	DEN
Are You Ready – The Savage Rose Live	Released: 24 May 2004; Label: Street Ballerina Music; Formats: CD	18

==== Compilation albums ====
Title	Album details	Peak chart positions
Title	Album details	DEN
Pop History Vol. 15	Released: 1971; Label: Polydor; Formats: 2xLP	—
I'm Satisfied	Released: 1971; Label: Karussell; Formats: LP	—
Pop Giants Vol. 12	Released: 1973; Label: Brunswick; Formats: LP	—
The Best of the Savage Rose	Released: 1977; Label: Polydor; Formats: LP, MC	—
The Best of Yesteryear Vol. 12	Released: 1990; Label: Dark Blue; Formats: CD	—
25	Released: 1993; Label: Mega; Formats: 2xCD	—
1968–1973	Released: 2001; Label: Universal; Formats: 8xCD	—
1978–1992	Released: 2001; Label: Mega; Formats: 8xCD	—
The Anthology	Released: 4 November 2002; Label: Universal/Mega; Formats: 2xCD	22
"—" denotes releases that did not chart or were not released in that territory.

=== Singles ===
Title	Year	Peak chart positions	Album
Title	Year	DEN	Album
"A Girl I Knew"	1968	8	The Savage Rose
"Evening's Child"	1968	8	In the Plain
"Long Before I Was Born"	1968	5	In the Plain
Birthday Day"/"The Schoolteacher Said So"	1969	4	Non-album single
"Travelin'"	1969	10	Travelin'
"My Family Was Gay" (US-only release)	1969	—	Travelin'
"Sunday Morning"	1971	19	Your Daily Gift
"Walking in the Line"	1971	—	Refugee
"Revival Day"	1971	—	Refugee
"The Messenger Speaks"	1972	—	Babylon
"Der sejler et skib (Sangen til Mia)"	1989	—	Non-album singles
"Stjerneskud (Når lysene tændes i parken)"	1989	12	Non-album singles
"Solen var også din"	1990	—	Gadens dronning
"Den største af alt er kærlighed"	1991	—	Non-album single
"Fri som en sommervind"	1992	—	Månebarn
"Run Rose"	1996	—	Black Angel
"Pigestemmer"	2001	—	Non-album single
"A World Aflame (Not in Your Name)"	2002	—	The Anthology
"I Hear Them Coming"	2007	—	Universal Daughter
"Woman"	2017	—	Homeless
"Harassing"	2018	—	Homeless
"—" denotes releases that did not chart or were not released in that territory.

== Guest appearances ==
- 1969 Newport Jazz Festival
- 1974 Ragnarock'73 (The shoeshine boy is dead) "Ragnarock was a Rockfestival in Norway '73, '74 and '75 and released one LP"
- 1976 Christiania (De vilde blomster gror)
- 1976 Christiania (I kan ikke slå os ihjel) "Recorded by Bifrost with Annisette, Poul Dissing and Sebastian on Vocals"
- 2004 Bevar Christiania (Junglebarn)
