= Annisette Koppel =

Danish singer (born 1948)

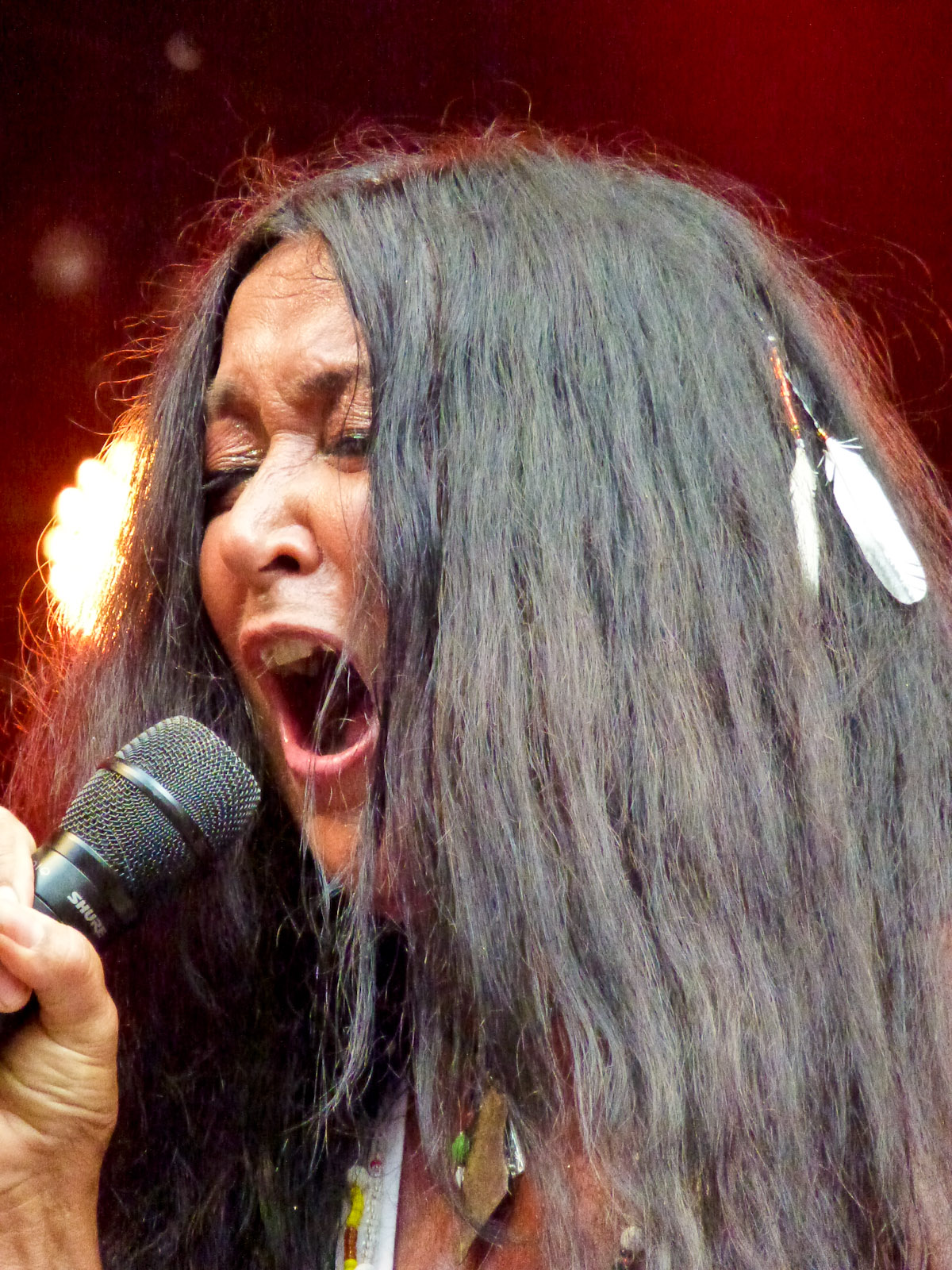
- Annisette Koppel, The Savage Rose concert in Denmark in 2011

Background information
- Birth name: Annisette Hansen
- Also known as: Annisette
- Born: August 29, 1948 (age 76); Copenhagen
- Years active: (1950s –present)
- Website: www.thesavagerose.net

Annisette Koppel (born 29 August 1948, née Annisette Hansen) is a Danish singer.

Annisette's recording debut as a singer began in the late 1950s when she and her sister Rudi Hansen recorded some children's songs for the Swedish record label Sonet. By the age of 16, Annisette was performing live on stage with the pop group Dandy Swingers and released a solo-single "Livet Er Nu" (Life Is Now).

In 1967 Annisette formed the band The Savage Rose together with brothers Thomas and Anders Koppel. She has two daughters Billie Koppel and Naja Rosa Koppel from her marriages to Thomas Koppel.

In 1996 Annisette was awarded the Danish Jazz, Rock and Folk Authors Honorary Award. In the same year, her band, The Savage Rose received the Danish Music Awards for their US recorded album Black Angel.

In 2014 Annisette was presented with the Fredsprisen fra Kunstnere For Fred (Peace-award from the Artists for Peace)

== Discography ==
- The Savage Rose

== Filmography ==
- Father of Four (1953)
- Fløjtespilleren (1953)
- Far til fire i sneen (1954)
- Bruden fra Dragstrup (1955)
- Kristiane af Marstal (1956)
- Far til fire i byen (1956)
- Far til fire og onkel Sofus (1957)
