= The Triumph of Death (ballet) =

- Native title: Dødens Triumf
- Choreographer: Flemming Flindt
- Music: Thomas Koppel
- Libretto: Flemming Flindt
- Based on: Eugène Ionesco´s Jeux de massacre
- Premiere: 23 May 1971; Danish TV
- Original ballet company: Royal Danish Ballet
- Design: Poul Arnt Thomsen; Søren Breum

The Triumph of Death is a Danish ballet from 1971 with choreography by Flemming Flindt and music by Thomas Koppel recorded by The Savage Rose. Libretto by Flemming Flindt, based on Eugène Ionesco's play Jeux de massacre.
