= 1961 Mexican legislative election =

Legislative elections were held in Mexico on 2 July 1961. The Institutional Revolutionary Party (PRI) won 172 of the 178 seats in the Chamber of Deputies.

== Results ==
| Party | Votes | % | Seats | +/– |
|---|---|---|---|---|
| Institutional Revolutionary Party (PRI) | 6,178,434 | 90.25 | 172 | +19 |
| National Action Party (PAN) | 518,652 | 7.58 | 5 | –1 |
| Popular Socialist Party (PPS) | 65,143 | 0.95 | 1 | 0 |
| Authentic Party of the Mexican Revolution (PARM) | 33,671 | 0.49 | 0 | –1 |
| Nationalist Party of Mexico (PNM) | 19,082 | 0.28 | 0 | –1 |
| Non-registered candidates | 30,844 | 0.45 | 0 | 0 |
| Total | 6,845,826 | 100.00 | 178 | +16 |
| Registered voters/turnout | 10,004,696 | – | | |
Source: Nohlen
