= Naja Rosa =

Danish singer-songwriter (born 1980)

Naja Rosa Koppel (born 1980) is a Danish singer-songwriter. She is the daughter of Savage Rose founders Annisette and Thomas Koppel and raised in Denmark and USA. She debuted on 16 August 2010 with her album Naja Rosa, which she released to favourable reviews by critics. She is regarded as the renewer of the tradition of Savage Rose. Koppel's first solo concert in Denmark was held at the "Spotfestival" in Aarhus in 2010, for which she was awarded 6 stars by Danish music magazine Gaffa.

== Discography ==
=== Albums ===
Year	Title	Highest position	Certification
Year	Title	Denmark	Certification
2010	Naja Rosa	4	
2012	The Place I Call Home	7	
2014	These Are The Times		

=== Singles ===
Year	Single	Peak chart positions	Certifications	Album
Year	Single	Denmark	Certifications	Album
2010	"When the Smoke Clears"	-		Naja Rosa
