= Juan José Suárez Coppel =

Mexican economist

- Born: Mazatlán, Sinaloa
- Education: ITAM, University of Chicago
- Employer(s): CEO PEMEX (2009–2012); CFO PEMEX (2000–2006)
- Predecessor: Jesús F. Reyes Heroles
- Successor: Emilio Lozoya

Juan José Suárez Coppel is a Mexican economist. He was the director-general of PEMEX, the state-owned government-granted monopoly in Mexico's petroleum industry, from 2009 to 2012. He is of Spanish ancestry.

== History ==
Suárez Coppel is a native of Mazatlán, Sinaloa, where his father established himself after fleeing the Spanish Civil War. He is a graduate of the Instituto Tecnológico Autónomo de México in Mexico City, and earned his Ph.D. in economics from the University of Chicago.

He has taught economics at several leading universities in Mexico and Europe, and at Brown University in the United States.
