= Óscar Levín Coppel =

Mexican politician (1948–2026)

- Born: 4 September 1948; Mazatlán, Sinaloa, Mexico
- Died: 1 July 2026 (aged 77); Mexico City, Mexico
- Occupation: Politician
- Political party: PRI

Óscar Guillermo Levín Coppel (Note: In this Mexican name, the surname is Levín and the second or maternal family name is Coppel.) (4 September 1948 – 1 July 2026) was a Mexican economist, educator and politician from the Institutional Revolutionary Party (PRI).

== Early life and education ==
Levín Coppel was a native of Mazatlán, Sinaloa. In 1970 he earned a degree in economics from the National Autonomous University of Mexico (UNAM), where he later taught.

== Career ==
Levín Coppel taught at his alma mater, National Autonomous University of Mexico.

He was elected to the Chamber of Deputies on three occasions: in the 1994 general election, for the Federal District's 23rd congressional district; in the 2000 general election, as a plurinominal deputy for the fourth electoral region; and in the 2009 mid-terms, as a plurinominal deputy for the first region.

Levín Coppel also served in the Legislative Assembly of the Federal District from 1997 to 2000 and as borough chief of both Gustavo A. Madero (1992–1993) and Álvaro Obregón (1993–1994). In 2006, President Felipe Calderón appointed him director of the Casa de Moneda de México, the national mint, where he remained until 2009.

== Personal life and demise ==
Levín Coppel died in Mexico City on 1 July 2026, at age 77.
