= Rugsted & Kreutzfeldt =

Danish singing duo

- Origin: Denmark
- Genres: Rock
- Years active: 1979–1984
- Members: Jens Rugsted; Stig Kreutzfeldt
- Website: www.rugstedkreutzfeldt.dk

Rugsted & Kreutzfeldt is a Danish singing duo made up of Jens Rugsted and Stig Kreutzfeldt, and were very active from 1979 to 1984 and had a series of very successful albums in a smooth West Coast rock style. Their 1979 song "Jeg ved det godt" became a classic "evergreen" hit. Most of their big hits were written by Dan Turèll.

The duo split in 1984, but continued to work with other artists like Sanne Salomonsen, Thomas Helmig, Allan Olsen and Kim Larsen.

The duo had a comeback from 2006 on with many releases and rereleases. In 2011, they released Rugsted & Kreutzfeldt 5. It hit #3 on the Danish Albums Chart in its first week of release.

== Discography ==
=== Albums ===
- 1979: Rugsted Kreutzfeldt 1
- 1980: Rugsted Kreutzfeldt 2
- 1982: Rugsted Kreutzfeldt 3
- 1984: R'n'K Band - English Compilation
- 1985: Jorden kalder
- 1988: Rugsted Kreutzfeldt 1+2 (rerelease)
- 1996: Scrapbog
- 2005: Tilfældigvis forbi
- 2007: Går gennem tiden 1977-2007 (compilation)
- 2011: Rugsted & Kreutzfeldt 5
