= Lone Koppel =

Danish operatic soprano (born 1938)

Lone Herman Koppel (born 1938) is a Danish operatic soprano who for some 42 years was one of the leading opera singers at Copenhagen's Royal Theatre. Among her memorable performances was her 1964 appearance in Puccini's Tosca, which was broadcast on Danish television.

== Biography ==
Born on 20 May 1938 in Copenhagen, Denmark, Lone Herman Koppel was the daughter of the composer Herman David Koppel (1908–1998) and Edel Vibeke Clausen-Bruun (1909–1976). She married three times: on 15 June 1961 with the editor Erik Cosman Lindgren (born 1939), divorced in 1969; on 30 April 1969 with the pianist and opera director John Winther (born 1933), divorced in 1979; and on 23 July 1983 with the Swedish opera singer Björn Asker (born 1941). She has three children: Mie (1963), Thomas Peter (1965) and Nikolaj (1969).

Brought up in a musical family, she sang from an early age and by the time she was 11, could accompany herself while singing songs by Brahms and Schubert. She studied at the Royal Danish Conservatoire under Dora Sigurdsson before specializing in opera at the Royal Theatre's Opera Academy. While studying, she appeared in public with her father but it was in September 1962 that she made her mark playing Musetta in Puccini's La bohème. Two years later, together with Ib Hansen, she achieved even greater success as Tosca in a television production directed by Holger Boland.

From 1964 to 1966, she joined the Kiel Opera but remained the most popular operatic soprano in Denmark as she performed leading roles such as Santuzza in Cavalleria rusticana, Elisabeth in Tannhäuser and Senta in Der fliegende Holländer and once again as Tosca when the opera was again presented by the Royal Theatre in 1967. Other successes included her roles Salome, in Ariadne auf Naxos, Elisabeth and Venus in Tannhäuser, Senta in Fliegende Holländer,Simone Boccanegra (1968), Eugene Onegin (1968), and Il trovatore (1971). In the 1960s and early 1970s, she was Copenhagen's most productive opera singer, performing not only traditional roles but also participating in the new repertoire, for example as Marie in Berg's Wozzeck or playing the title role in Shostakovich's Katerina Ismailova. Later: Abigaille in Nabucco, Ortrud in Lohengrin, Kundry in Parsifal, Amneris in Aida, Jenufa and Kostelnicka in Jenufa.

In 1973, together with her husband John Winther, she joined the Australian Opera where, in addition to her Danish roles, she sang Jenny in Weill's Mahagonny. On returning to Copenhagen in 1978, her new roles included Lady Macbeth in Verdi's Macbeth and the title role in Richard Strauss's Elektra (opera), which she also performed for her 25th anniversary at the Royal Theatre in 1987. She also received acclaim for playing the comic role of Fata Morgana in Prokofiev's The Love for Three Oranges.

Koppel was invited by Poul Jørgensen to direct Peter Heise's Drot og marsk at the Royal Theatre in 1993. During her career, she has also performed in concerts throughout Scandinavia as well as in England, Germany, the Netherlands and New Zealand.

== Awards and honours ==
In 1971, Koppel received the Tagea Brandt Rejselegat and in 1991 was honoured as a Knight 1st Class of the Order of the Dannebrog. In August 2016, she received the Copenhagen Opera Festival's Order of Merit for singing "Vissi d’arte" from Tosca, 55 years after her first performance.
