= Adrián Pedrozo Castillo =

Mexican politician

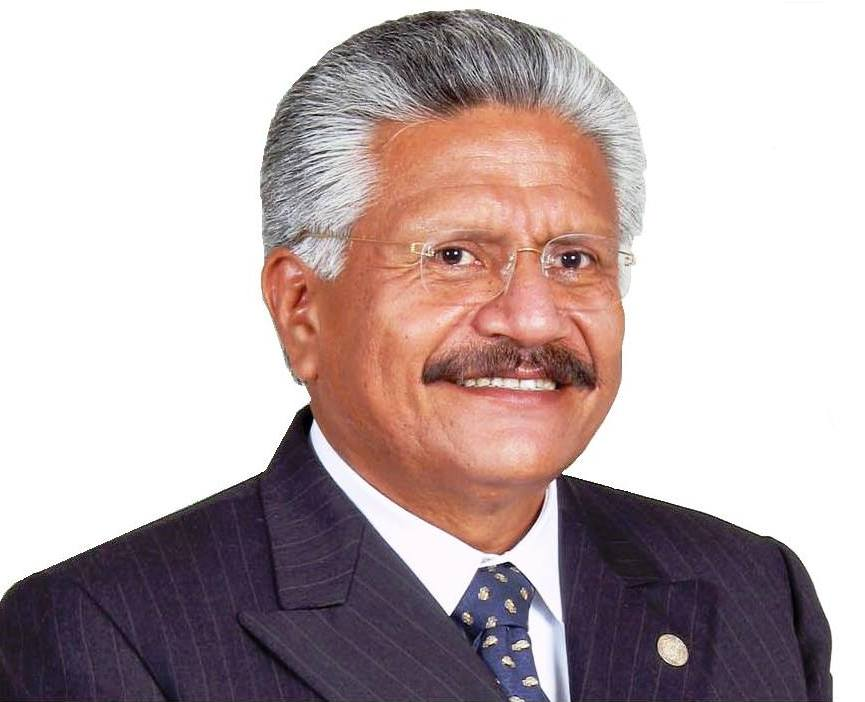
- Adrián Pedrozo Castillo
- Born: 8 July 1948 (age 77); Zitácuaro, Michoacán, Mexico
- Occupation: Politician
- Political party: PRD

Adrián Pedrozo Castillo (born 8 July 1948) is a Mexican politician affiliated with the Party of the Democratic Revolution. He served as Deputy of the LX Legislature of the Mexican Congress representing the Federal District.
