= Erik Norby =

Danish composer

Erik Norby (January 6, 1936 – January 16, 2007) was a Danish composer.

He is buried at Frederiksberg Ældre Kirkegård in Copenhagen.
