= Hella Joof =

Danish actress and film director

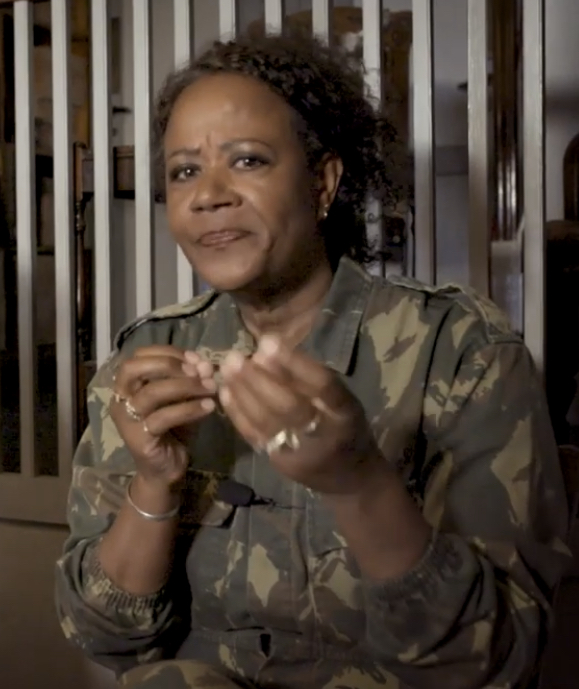
- Born: 1 November 1962 (age 62); Birkerød, Denmark
- Occupation(s): Actress, film director
- Years active: 1990–present

Hella Joof (born 1 November 1962) is a Danish actress and director. She was born to a Danish mother and an aristocratic Gambian father who belonged to the Joof dynasty.

Joof directed En kort en lang (2001), Oh Happy Day (2004) and Fidibus (2006). Her feature film debut En kort en lang was seen by ten percent of the Danish population, and her second feature Oh Happy Day, was sold to Disney for a US remake. Shake It All About was entered into the 24th Moscow International Film Festival. She has hosted Bullerfnis and other children's TV-programs, but was also the voice of the title character in the hardcore pornographic film Constance (1998).

As an actress, Joof is best known for award-winning performances as supporting characters in such comedies as Hannibal & Jerry (1997), Den eneste ene (1999), and Humørkort-stativ-sælgerens søn (2002). Joof appears as one of the three judges in the Television Show Talent 09 a Danish adaption of Britain's Got Talent.

In 2016, her film Almost Perfect (2012, Sover Dolly på ryggen?) was aired in Latin America, the United States and Africa by the TV channel Eurochannel.

== Filmography ==
Work	Year	Credit	Notes
All Inclusive	2014	Direction	Feature
Woolfert	2013	Voice	Short fiction
Almost Perfect (Sover Dolly på ryggen?)	2012	Direction	Feature
The Talent Thief	2012	Appearance	Feature
Anstalten	2011	Direction	TV series
Sammy's adventures: The secret passage	2010	Voice	Feature
Hush Little Baby	2009	Direction	Feature
Album	2008	Direction	TV series
Linan yökirja	2007	Direction	Feature
Rene hjerter	2006	Executive producer	Feature
The ugly duckling and me	2006	Voice	Feature
Easy Skanking	2006	Direction	Feature
Hjerteflimmer	2006	Sarahs klient	TV series
Oh Happy Day	2004	Direction	Feature
Normalerweize	2004	Appearance	TV series
Someone Like Hodder	2003	Skolepsykolog	Feature
The man who couldn't say no	2002	Bolette, hans eks-kæreste	Feature
Shake It All About	2001	Direction	Feature
Den eneste ene	1999	Dame fra adoptionsnævnet	Feature
Constance	1999	Narrator	Feature
Blyppernes første år	1999	Vivi	TV series
Mimi and the movers	1998	Pernille	Feature
Election Night	1998	Kvinde	Short fiction
Sinan's wedding	1997	Puk	Short fiction
Hannibal & Jerry	1997	Hell, politidame	Feature
The greatest heroes	1996	Eva	Feature
Snooks in the limelight	1994	Ditte	Feature
Stormfulde hjerter	1994	Appearance	TV film
Bullerfnis	1990	Appearance	TV series

== See also ==
- List of female film and television directors
- List of LGBT-related films directed by women
