= Nikolaj Koppel =

Danish musician, journalist and radio presenter (born 1969)

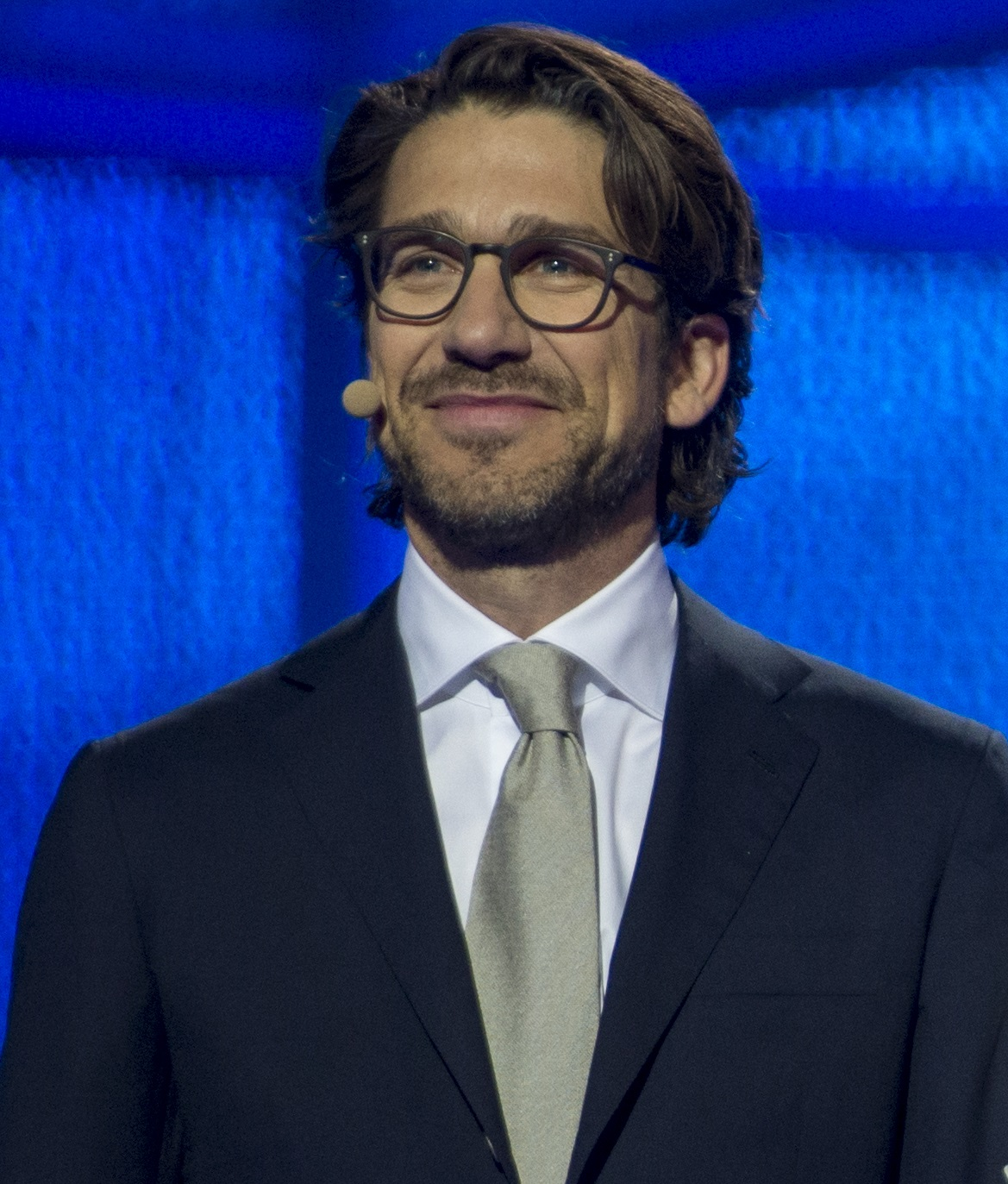
- Koppel hosting the Eurovision Song Contest
- Born: 6 March 1969 (age 57); Gentofte, Denmark
- Education: Royal Danish Academy of Music
- Occupations: Musician and journalist
- Spouse: Sille Kroyer Koppel (1998 - present)
- Children: 2
- Mother: Lone Koppel

Nikolaj Koppel (born 6 March 1969) is a Danish musician, journalist and radio presenter.

== Life and career ==
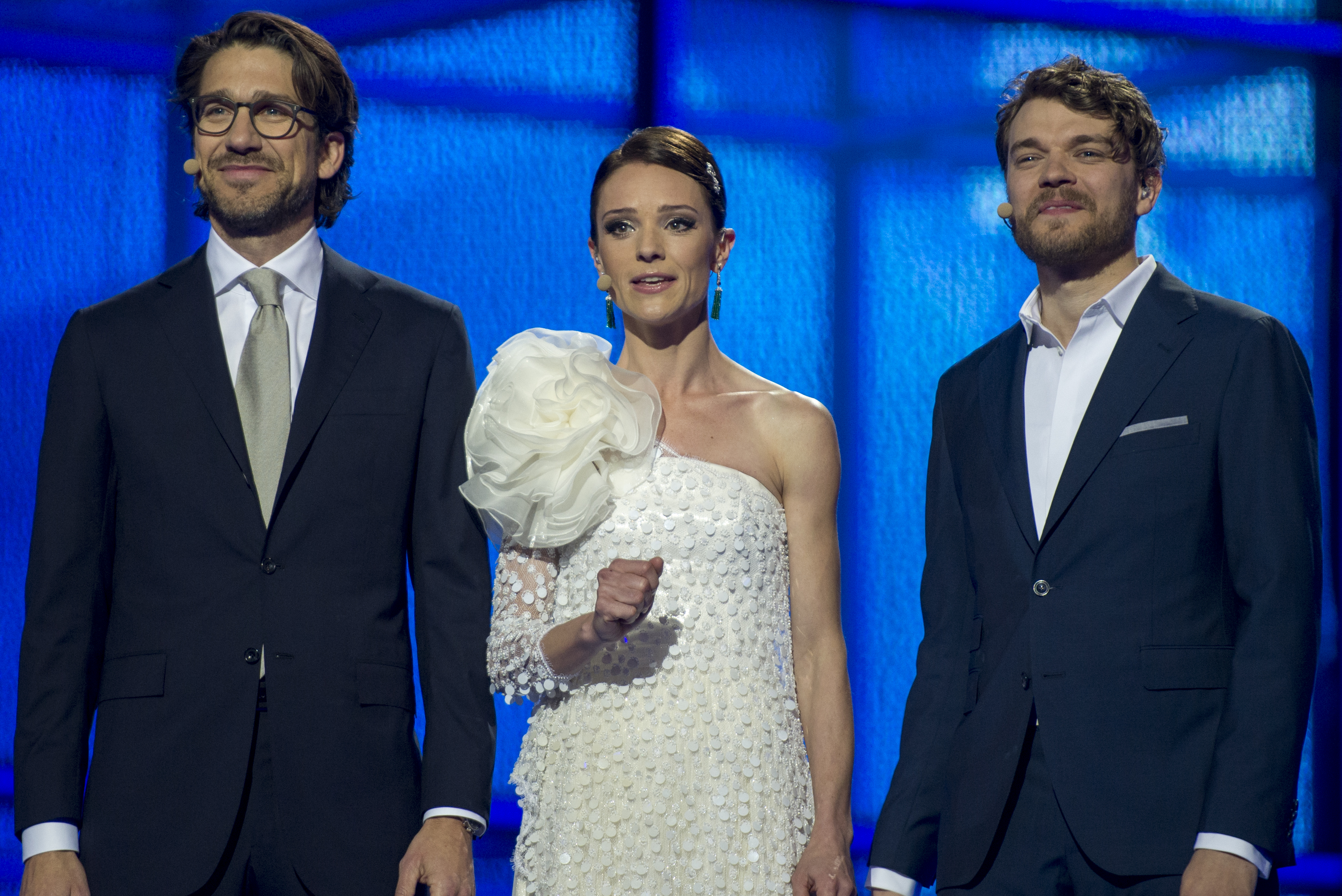
Koppel, Lise Rønne and Pilou Asbæk during the first dress rehearsal of the first semifinal of the Eurovision Song Contest 2014.

Koppel was born to opera singer Lone Koppel and pianist John Winther. He studied at the Royal Danish Academy of Music and went on to become a concert pianist in 1998, but retired from the business after just two years. He later took up work as a music journalist on Danmarks Radio, he also served as editor for the magazine Euroman. Since 2005, he returned to the music industry where he served as musical director for Tivoli until 2018.

For television he was judge on the 2009 edition of Talent (the Danish version of the Got Talent series). Since 2010 he has been a presenter on DR P2, where he is heard every Sunday morning.

On 4 February 2014, DR announced that Koppel would co-host the Eurovision Song Contest 2014 alongside Lise Rønne and Pilou Asbæk.

In 2019, he became content director for Podimo, a commercial podcast content platform.

== See also ==
- List of Eurovision Song Contest presenters
