= Herman David Koppel =

Danish composer and pianist (1908–1998)

- Born: 1 October 1908; Copenhagen, Denmark
- Died: 14 July 1998 (aged 89); Copenhagen, Denmark
- Education: Royal Danish Academy of Music
- Spouse: Vibeke Koppel
- Children: Therese Koppel; Lone Koppel; Thomas Koppel; Anders Koppel
- Relatives: Brother: Julius Koppel

Herman David Koppel, known in Denmark as Herman D. Koppel, (1 October 1908 – 14 July 1998) was a Danish composer and pianist. Born in Copenhagen, he fled the Nazis with his family to Sweden in 1943. He wrote 7 symphonies, numerous concertos, 6 string quartets and other chamber music, piano works, operas and film music.

He was the father of Anders Koppel and Thomas Koppel, both composers, Lone Koppel, an opera singer, and Therese Koppel, pianist, and the brother of the violinist Julius Koppel.

== Early life and education ==
Born on 1 October 1908 in Copenhagen, Herman David Koppel was born shortly after his Jewish parents had emigrated to Denmark from Poland.

Like his younger brother Julius, a violinist and concertmaster, he studied piano from the age of 17 at the Royal Danish Conservatory under Rudolph Simonsen and Emilius Bangert. In addition, he studied privately under the Norwegian-Danish pianist Anders Rachlew (1882–1970) and undertook study trips to Germany, England and France.

== Career ==
=== Pianist ===
As a pianist, Koppel premiered in 1930 at a concert where he included Carl Nielsen's Opus 40, "Theme with Variations", which was enthusiastically acclaimed as "never having been played so beautifully as this evening". Shortly before Nielsen's death in 1931, Koppel performed a concert dedicated to his music, first playing the pieces for Nielsen himself. Thereafter, throughout his life, Koppel continued to perform Nielsen's compositions.

In addition to Nielsen's music, Koppel's repertoire included romantic pieces, especially those by Mozart and Brahms. He also frequently played more modern music from a variety of composers, including the concertos of Bartok, Hans Werner Henze and Darius Milhaud and pieces by Stravinsky and Arnold Schoenberg. Koppel played chamber music in the Koppel Quartet and accompanied singers including Aksel Schiøtz and his daughter Lone Koppel.

=== Composer ===
As a composer he was self-taught. His début composition was a string quartet (1928–29) which, like his other early works, was inspired by Nielsen and Stravinsky. The first work in his own style was his Piano Concerto No. 1 in March 1933, with its primitive Russian dance rhythms and Afro-American jazz. Koppel himself preferred his Piano Concerto No. 2 (1938) while No. 3 (1948) is Denmark's most popular piano concerto and one of the few to be published as a recording.

Only a few of the works he wrote in the 1930s have survived. The most important is the jazz-inspired music he wrote together with Bernhard Christensen for Kjeld Abell's musical comedy Melodien der blev væk (The Melody That Got Lost) premiered in 1935. During the German occupation of Denmark in the Second World War, Koppel, together with his wife and two small children, had to move to Sweden. It was there he wrote his Symphony No. 3. His Tre Davidssalmer (1950) was inspired by an episode he witnessed during the war when a group of Jews locked inside a German truck began to sing slowly and softly.

Koppel wrote seven symphonies, his fifth winning the Tivoli competition in 1956. His most successful works are his oratorios: Moses (1964), Requiem (1966) and Lovsange (1973). His only opera Macbeth, performed at the Royal Danish Theatre in 1970, was less successful, receiving mixed reviews. As for his chamber music, the most often performed are his Sekstet for klaver og blæsere (1942) and Ternio for cello and piano (1951). Koppel also wrote music for 29 films and several stage and radio plays. He continued to compose and perform until the mid-1990.

== Personal life ==
Koppel died in Copenhagen on 14 July 1998 and is buried in Vestre Cemetery.

== Works ==
Musiques régénérées

=== Orchestral ===
- Symphonies
  - Symphony No. 1 (1931) Op. 5
  - Symphony No. 2 (1943) Op. 37
  - Symphony No. 3 (1944–45) Op. 39
  - Symphony No. 4 (1946) Op. 42
  - Symphony No. 5 (1955) Op. 60
  - Symphony No. 6 Sinfonia Breve (1957) Op. 63
  - Symphony No. 7 (1960–61) Op.70
- Music for Strings (1930)
- Music for Jazz Orchestra (1932)
- Variations for Small Orchestra (1935)
- Festival Overture (1939)
- Concertino No. 1 (1937–38), for string orchestra
- Concertino No. 2 (1957), for string orchestra
- Sinfonietta (1945)
- Concerto for Orchestra (1977–78) Op. 101
- Intrada (1979)
- Prelude to a Symphony, Op. 105 (1979)
- I Dis og Drøm (1992), for string orchestra
- Memory (1994), for string orchestra

=== Concertante ===
- Piano Concerto No. 1 (1931–32)
- Piano Concerto No. 2 (1936–37) Op. 30
- Piano Concerto No. 3 (1948) Op. 45
- Piano Concerto No. 4 (1960–63)
- Violin Concerto (1929)
- Capriccio for Violin and Orchestra (1934)
- Clarinet Concerto (1941) Op. 35
- Double Concerto for Violin, Viola and Orchestra (1947) Op. 43
- Cello Concerto (1952–56) Op. 56
- Oboe Concerto (1970)
- Chamber Concerto for Violin and String Orchestra (1970)
- Flute Concerto (1971) Op. 87
- Eight Variations and Epilogue, for piano and orchestra (1972)
- Triple Concertino, for string trio and orchestra (1983)

=== Chamber/Instrumental ===
- String Quartets
  - String Quartet No. 1 (1928–29)
  - String Quartet No. 2 (1939) Op. 34
  - String Quartet No. 3 (1944–45) Op. 38
  - String Quartet No. 4 (1964)
  - String Quartet No. 5 (1975)
  - String Quartet No. 6 (1979)
- Duo for violin and piano (1930)
- Trio for Clarinet, Violin and Piano (1931)
- Sonatina for Wind Quintet (1932)
- Variations on a Jewish folk dance for string trio (1932)
- Duo for Clarinet and Bassoon (1932)
- Eleven Variations on an Original Theme for flute and string trio (1935)
- Suite for flute, violin and cello (1936)
- Sextet for Winds and Piano (1942) Op. 36
- Fantasy for Clarinet (1947)
- Ternio I for piano trio (1951) Op. 53b
- Piano Quintet (1953) Op. 57
- Divertimento pastorale for oboe, viola and cello (1955)
- Cello Sonata (1956) Op. 62
- Variations for clarinet and piano (1961)
- Capriccio for flute and piano (1961)
- Nine Variations for piano trio (1969)
- Four Improvisations for flute and cello (1970)
- Suite for Solo Cello (1971) Op. 86
- Piano Trio (1971) Op. 88
- Eight Variations and Epilogue for piano and 13 instruments (1972)
- Divertimento, for string trio (1972)
- Ternio II for solo saxophone (1973)
- Variazioni pastorale fl, vl, vla, vlc (1975)
- Variazoni libre 2 cl, Bcl, perc (1976)
- Dialogue for solo flute (1977)
- Patch-work, for flute, viola and harp (1981)
- Piano Quartet (1986)
- Trio for Clarinet, Cello and Piano (1986)
- Cantilena for violin and cello (1988)
- Music for Wind Octet (1991) Op. 123
- Music for Violin and Piano (1991)
- Giocattolo fl, cl, perc, pno, vlc (1993)

=== Works for piano ===
- Piano Sonata E minor, op. 1, 1928
- Variations and Fugue for Piano, op. 3, 1929
- Piano Piece, op. 7, 1930
- Suite for Klavier [Suite for Piano] Op. 21 (1934)
- Sonata no. 1 for Piano, op. 50, 1950
- 15 miniaturer [15 Miniatures] op. 97a (1976)
