= Anders Koppel =

Danish musician (born 1947)

Anders Koppel (born 17 July 1947) is a Danish musician and was co-founder in 1967 of the rock group Savage Rose.

Koppel was born in Copenhagen. From 1976 to 2012 he was a member of the trio Bazaar. He plays in the trio Koppel-Andersen-Koppel which includes his son, saxophone player Benjamin Koppel, founder of the record label Cowbell and former music director of Jazzhus Montmartre. Anders Koppel has twice received the Danish film award Robert for best film score (1994 and 1996). His first daughter Sara Koppel is an animator and artist, and the second daughter Marie Carmen Koppel is a gospel, soul, and jazz singer.

Koppel has composed music for eight ballets for the New Danish Dance Theatre and music for more than 150 movies, 50 theatrical plays and three musicals. He has also composed more than 90 works for classical ensembles, chamber music and 20 concertos, among them two saxophone concertos and four marimba concertos.

He played the piano as a child with his father, composer Herman D. Koppel, and later clarinet with several television and concert appearances. He began playing the organ in 1966.

== Sources ==
- Anders Koppel at IMDb
